= Timeline of County Durham =

The following is a timeline of the history of County Durham, England.

== 2nd Century ==
- 120-122
  - Pons Aelius a small Roman fort and bridge (linking to the Gateshead side of the River Tyne) was established in what is now Newcastle upon Tyne

== 6th century ==
=== 550s ===
- 559
  - Ida of Bernicia is the first known King of Bernicia; he reigned from 547 to 559.

=== 590s ===
- 593
  - Æthelfrith became king of Bernicia, with its capital in Bamburgh

== 7th century ==
=== 600s ===
- 604
  - Æthelfrith, king of Bernicia, took control of the Anglo-Saxon kingdom of Deira to form Northumbria

=== 610s ===
- 613
  - Æthelfrith engaged in the Battle of Chester.
- 617
  - Eadwine became king of the united realms of Bernicia and Deira

=== 650s ===
- 653
  - Bede refers to Utta as Abbot of Gateshead

== 9th century ==
=== 870s ===
- 875
  - Vikings under Halfdan Ragnarsson sailed into the River Tyne and sacked monasteries at Tynemouth and Jarrow, before anchoring at the mouth of the River Team in Gateshead

=== 880s ===
- 883
  - Shrine of Saint Cuthbert was established at Chester-le-Street

== 10th century ==
=== 910s ===
- 915
  - Ealdred I of Bernicia and Constantine II of Scotland are defeated by Vikings in the first Battle of Corbridge

=== 990s ===
- 995
  - Monks from Lindisfarne found a suitable resting place for the remains of St Cuthbert in Durham

== 11th century ==
=== 1000s ===
- 1003
  - Darlington became part of the patrimony of St Cuthbert

=== 1060s ===
- 1069
  - William I ruthlessly suppressed opposition in the Harrying of the North in Northumbria and Durham

=== 1070s ===
- 1070
  - William I recognised the natural strength of Durham's site and began to construct a castle

=== 1080s ===
- 1080
  - A church near the site of the current St Mary's Church in Gateshead was burned down by an angry mob with the Bishop of Durham inside

== 12th century ==
=== 1130s ===
- 1139
  - Under the terms of the Treaty of Durham, Northumberland, with the exception of Newcastle and Bamburgh, was ceded to Scottish rule

=== 1180s ===
- 1183
  - The Boldon Book, a rental survey of the bishopric of Durham was made for Hugh du Puiset, Bishop of Durham

== 13th century ==
=== 1240s ===
- 1242
  - Fire destroyed the wooden bridge over the River Tyne
- 1248
  - After fire destroyed the wooden bridge over the River Tyne, and much of the borough, a new stone bridge was eventually constructed

== 14th century ==
=== 1330s ===
- 1339
  - A flood swept away the greater part of the stone bridge at Newcastle

=== 1340s ===
- 1346
  - Thomas Menvill paid Bishop Hatfield an annual rent of 2s to build ships at Hendon, Sunderland (according to a 1697 copy of a document dated 1346)

=== 1350s ===
- 1353
  - Newcastle became one of ten Staple towns, an Act of Parliament decreeing that 'no wools of growth in Northumberland, Cumberland, Westmorland, Durham, Richmond and Allerton, should be shipped anywhere but Newcastle'

=== 1380s ===
- 1388
  - The Bishop of Durham camped at Elsdon on his way to Otterburn in Northumberland

== 16th century ==
=== 1540s ===
- 1540
  - John Leland described the Bishop of Durham's deer park in Weardale as 'rudely enclosed with stone of a 12 or 14 miles in compass near Westgate and Eastgate'
  - John Leland described Darlington as 'the best market town in the bishopric, saving Duresme' (Durham)

=== 1550s ===
- 1553
  - Newcastle secured an Act in Parliament incorporating Gateshead into Newcastle, later repealed
- 1554
  - The Bishop of Durham had to cede quayside facilities in Gateshead to the mayor and corporation of Newcastle

== 17th century ==
=== 1610s ===
- 1614
  - July: A Commission for 'conservancy of the river' (Tyne) was established by Order in Council made up of the Corporation of Newcastle, the Bishop of Durham and justices of the peace for the two counties (Durham & Northumberland)
- 1617
  - Newcastle secured the whole authority for conservancy of the Tyne, vested in the Mayor, six aldermen and certain members of the Merchant Company and Trinity House

=== 1640s ===
- Sunderland shipbuilders included Frances Readhead and Roger Thornton at Bishopwearmouth Panns
- 1644
  - 13 August: While Newcastle was besieged by the Scots, Lord Leven was quartered in Elswick and the Earl of Callendar at Gateshead

=== 1670s ===
- 1671
  - An Act for the enclosure of the three open-fields of Bishop Auckland was enacted
- 1672
  - The Goodchilds of Pallion, Sunderland, a local landowning family, built small ships to transport lime produced in their kilns

=== 1690s ===
- 1690
  - Ambrose Crowley, a Quaker nail-manufacturer, brought over German workmen to establish ironworking at Winlaton.

== 18th century ==
=== 1700s ===
- 1704
  - The London Lead Company, a group of Quakers, acquired Ryton lead smelting mill
- 1708
  - 18 August: an explosion at the colliery in Fatfield resulted in 69 deaths.

=== 1710s ===
- 1717
  - Causey Arch was built to carry a wagonway from Tanfield Colliery over a river

=== 1720s ===
- 1720s
  - Robert Wallis opened the first shipbuilding yard in South Shields
- 1726
  - The Grand Allies, a combination of coal-owning families in County Durham, was founded to extend the coal-fields by buying up large tracts of coal in the northwest of the county
  - It was estimated that in the Bishopric of Durham nine tenths of the land was enclosed

=== 1740s ===
- 1740
  - Only four ships, of an estimated 800 tons, were registered to South Shields
- 1747
  - The Team Works of the Hawks family opened in Gateshead with a few forges working up old iron brought in as ballast

=== 1750s ===
- 1750
  - Russell was launched by Headlam's yard (Gateshead), the largest vessel built on the Tyne up to that time, able to carry 30 keels of coal

=== 1760s ===
- 1763
  - A gas explosion at Fatfield colliery killed 17 people.
- 1767
  - First local public asylum for the pauper lunatics of Northumberland, Durham and Newcastle upon Tyne was erected by public subscription in Warden's Close, Newcastle
  - A gas explosion resulted in 39 deaths at Fatfield Colliery.

=== 1770s ===
- 1770
  - Arthur Young described the ironworks at Winlaton as 'supposed to be the greatest manufactory of its kind in Europe'.
- 1771
  - 17 November: The Great Flood of 1771 saw the collapse of part of the then Tyne Bridge and its eventual demolition
- 1772
  - Lockwood Broderick began building ships at South Shields
- 1773-81
  - A new bridge over the River Tyne was built, a low stone bridge of nine arches

=== 1780s ===
- 1781
  - New stone bridge over the River Tyne was completed
- 1788
  - The Universal Magazine of Knowledge and Pleasure reported that 'Before Sir Ambrose settled his people there the place (Winlaton) consisted of a few deserted cottages, but now contains about 1,500 inhabitants, mainly smiths'

=== 1790s ===
- 1793
  - John and Philip Laing from Fife established a shipyard at Monkwearmouth Shore
- 1796
  - Wearmouth Bridge was opened, a cast iron bridge over the River Wear at Sunderland
- 1797
  - Frederick Eden in his 'State of the Poor' reported on the depressed state of the coal industry in Tanfield parish
- 1799
  - There were 520 keels operating on the River Wear
  - An Act of Parliament was passed for the division of common land in Weardale Common

== 19th century ==
=== 1800s ===
- 1801
  - The population of Gateshead was 8,597
- 1807
  - Luke Crown started a shipyard at Monkwearmouth Shore
- 1809
  - 500 ships, totalling over 100,000 tons, were registered to South Shields, which hosted 12 shipbuilding yards and an even larger number of docks

=== 1810s ===
- 1816
  - Robert Surtees stated that 'In shipbuilding the Port of Sunderland stands at present the highest in the United Kingdom'
- 1818
  - Philip Laing opened a shipyard at Deptford yard in Sunderland

=== 1820s ===
- 1824
  - Newcastle Corporation took possession of the asylum for pauper lunatics of Northumberland, Durham and Newcastle upon Tyne and leased it to Dr Noel Smith
- 1825
  - Stockton and Darlington Railway was opened
- 1826
  - Peter Austin (SP Austin & Sons) opened a shipyard at Monkwearmouth Shore
  - Bowes Railway, a colliery railway, was opened

=== 1830s ===
- 1830
  - Thomas Dunn Marshall began building ships in part of the old yard of Robert Wallis in South Shields
- 1837
  - George Bartram and John Lister started a shipbuilding yard at South Hylton
- 1838
  - 18 June: A through railway line from Redheugh to Carlisle was opened
- 1832
  - Gateshead gained its own Member of Parliament
- 1835
  - Gateshead became a Municipal borough, although its functions were limited to raising rates, upkeep of roads etc
- 1837
  - George Bartram started a shipbuilding yard at Hylton
- 1838
  - William Pickersgill with Messrs Miller, Rawson and Watson began shipbuilding at the North Dock, Sunderland
- 1839
  - Thomas Dunn Marshall built the Tyne's first iron steamer, a small passenger ship named Star

=== 1840s ===
- 1840
  - There were 76 shipyards on the Wear and 251 ships were constructed totaling 64,446 tons
  - William Doxford founded his shipbuilding company and started building ships at Cox Green
- 1841
  - Thomas Dunn Marshall completed an iron twin-screw ferry named Bedlington
- 1842-1852
  - The shipyard of Thomas Dunn Marshall in South Shields built 10 wooden ships and 99 iron vessels
- 1843
  - James Laing, son of Philip Laing, took over the company as James Laing & Sons
- 1844
  - 28 September: A blackdamp explosion in the Little Pit, Hutton seam, killed 95 Haswell Coal Company workers, with just four survivors.
  - Penshaw Monument erected near Penshaw to commemorate John Lambton, 1st Earl of Durham, designed by John and Benjamin Green
- 1845
  - William Pickersgill split from his partners and developed a shipyard at Southwick, Sunderland
- 1846
  - SP Austin and Sons moved their yard across the river to a site near Wearmouth Bridge
  - Robert Thompson and his three sons began shipbuilding at North Sands and built their first ship in 11 weeks

=== 1850s ===
- 1850
  - The River Tyne Improvement Act established a Conservancy Commission to replace the traditional control by Newcastle Council
  - Queen Victoria formally opened the High Level Bridge and Newcastle railway station
  - George Short established a shipbuilding yard in Sunderland
- 1851
  - Charles Palmer and his brother George, opened a shipyard at Jarrow on the site of an earlier yard which had built wooden warships for the Royal Navy
- 1852
  - April: Northumberland, an iron paddle tug, was launched, the first vessel constructed by Palmers
  - 30 June: Iron-built steam collier John Bowes was launched, the second vessel built by Palmers
  - Andrew Leslie established a shipbuilding yard at Hebburn
- 1854
  - Several railway companies serving Newcastle were merged to form the North Eastern Railway
  - The Great fire of Newcastle and Gateshead followed an explosion and fire at Gateshead, which spread to the Quayside in Newcastle, and killed 53 people, destroyed the homes of 800 families and damaged many properties, clearing a long stretch of river frontage in Gateshead and Newcastle
  - George Biddell Airy conducted experiments on the mean density of the Earth at Harton pit near South Shields
- 1857
  - Blast furnaces for the production of pig-iron were established at Palmers Jarrow shipyard
  - William Doxford moved his shipbuilding yard to Pallion

=== 1860s ===
- 1860
  - Robert Thompson died and his son Joseph Lowes Thompson took over the shipbuilding company in Sunderland
- 1863
  - 15 August: Palmers launched four vessels simultaneously, Europa and Latana from the Jarrow yard and John McIntyre and No.1 from the Howdon yard
- 1869
  - Short Brothers of Sunderland moved their shipyard to Pallion

=== 1870s ===
- 1871
  - Bartrams moved to South Dock, Sunderland and were known as Bartram & Haswell after the owners, RA Bartram (son of George Bartram) and George Haswell
- 1875
  - Joseph Lowes Thompson died and his three sons took over the shipbuilding company in Sunderland, J. L. Thompson and Sons
- 1876
  - Swing Bridge, River Tyne was opened
- 1877
  - Palmers Shipbuilding and Iron Company had the highest output of ships in Britain
- 1879
  - Palmers Shipbuilding and Iron Company again had the highest output of ships in Britain

=== 1880s ===
- 1880
  - William Pickersgill was killed in his shipyard in Sunderland
- 1880–1883
  - Palmers Shipbuilding and Iron Company had the highest output of ships in Britain
- 1882
  - William Doxford, shipbuilder in Sunderland, died
- 1886
  - R and W Hawthorn merged with A. Leslie and Company shipbuilders in Hebburn to become R. & W. Hawthorn, Leslie and Company
- 1888
  - Palmers Shipbuilding and Iron Company had the highest output of ships in Britain
- 1889
  - Gateshead became a County borough
  - Palmers Shipbuilding and Iron Company had the highest output of ships in Britain
  - George Haswell retired from Bartram & Haswell and RA Bartram was joined by his two sons to form Bartram & Sons, shipbuilders in Sunderland

=== 1890s ===
- 1890
  - Palmers output of shipping for the year was 40,319 tons, comprising 13 vessels launched from the Jarrow and Howdon yards
- 1891
  - The population of Gateshead was 85,692
  - William Doxford & Sons shipbuilding company formed by William Doxford's sons, William Theodore, Alfred, Robert and Charles, in Sunderland
- 1897
  - James Laing, shipbuilder in Sunderland, was knighted
- 1898
  - James Laing changed the company name to Sir James Laing & Sons

== 20th century ==
=== 1900s ===
- 1904
  - Doxfords, shipbuilders in Sunderland, recorded the highest production of any shipyard in the world
- 1907
  - Doxfords, shipbuilders in Sunderland, again recorded the highest production of any shipyard in the world
  - Sir James Laing, shipbuilder in Sunderland, died
- 1909
  - Palmers Shipbuilding and Iron Company yard at Jarrow stretched nearly three quarters of a mile along the southern bank of the Tyne

=== 1910s ===
- 1911
  - Palmers leased the former Robert Stephenson shipyard at Hebburn
  - Palmers purchased the former Robert Stephenson shipyard at Hebburn
- 1917
  - 15 June: King George V and Queen Mary visited Sunderland touring all the main shipyards

=== 1920s ===
- 1923
  - London and North Eastern Railway (LNER) created, merging several railway companies
- 1924
  - 7 August: Newcastle upon Tyne and Gateshead Corporations (Bridge) Act received Royal assent approving construction of the Tyne Bridge
- 1925
  - August: Work started on construction of the Tyne Bridge
  - Langleeford and British Chemist launched by Palmers, the only two ships they launched in that year
- 1927
  - The last pit in the Gateshead area at Redheugh was closed
- 1928
  - 10 October: Tyne Bridge officially opened by King George V

=== 1930s ===
- 1931
  - February: British Strength, a tanker for the British Tanker Company, was launched at Palmers Hebburn yard. Palmers last merchant ship and the only ship they launched that year
  - Palmers Shipbuilding and Iron Company recorded losses of £119,000
- 1933
  - Palmers Shipbuilding and Iron Company went into receivership
- 1934
  - The receiver sold Palmers to National Shipbuilding Security Ltd who then sold the Jarrow yard to a demolition company
- 1935
  - Most of Palmers Jarrow yard was dismantled by a demolition company
- 1936
  - Jarrow Crusade
  - Construction of the Team Valley Trading Estate in Gateshead began, owned by North Eastern Trading Estates Ltd

=== 1940s ===
- 1941
  - February: Snow fell continuously for over 50 hours and reached a depth of 42 inches in Durham
  - Lady Churchill visited a number of shipyards during a visit to Sunderland
- 1943
  - King George VI visited J. L. Thompson and Sons shipyard during a visit to Sunderland
- 1946
  - 30 April: Princess Elizabeth visited Sunderland to open the Sunderland Eye Infirmary and to launch the British Princess at James Laing & Sons

=== 1950s ===
- 1954
  - SP Austin & Sons merged with William Pickersgill & Sons Ltd to form Austin & Pickersgill shipbuilders in Sunderland and redeveloped the Southwick yard

=== 1960s ===
- 1960
  - By 1960 John Readhead and Sons at South Shields had built 87 vessels for the Hain Line
- 1963
  - Newcastle University became independent of Durham University
- 1964
  - Short Brothers of Sunderland shipyard was closed with the loss of 300 jobs
- 1966–1968
  - Shipbuilders on the Tyne were merged into Swan Hunter, including John Readhead & Sons at South Shields, Vickers Armstrong at Walker, Hawthorn Leslie at Hebburn and Clelands Shipbuilding at Willington Quay
- 1967
  - Bartram & Sons was taken over by Austin & Pickersgill shipbuilders in Sunderland
- 1968
  - Bowes Railway was still in use in its entirety

=== 1970s ===
- 1973-74
  - Gateshead became a Metropolitan borough which included Blaydon, Felling, Ryton, Whickham, Birtley and Lamesley
- 1974
  - The county of Tyne and Wear was created
  - The last section of Bowes Railway became disused and it is now a railway museum

== See also ==
- History of County Durham
- Timeline of Gateshead
- Timeline of Sunderland
- Timeline of Tyne and Wear

== Sources ==
- Atkinson, Frank (1979). The Great Northern Coalfield 1700-1900. Newcastle upon Tyne: Frank Graham. ISBN 0 85983 121 3.
- Bruce, John Collingwood (1904). Lectures on Old Newcastle. Newcastle upon Tyne: Andrew Reid & Co Ltd.
- Burton, Anthony (1994). The Rise and Fall of British Shipbuilding. London: Constable & Co. ISBN 0-09-472920-4.
- Charleton, Robert John (1899). A History of Newcastle upon Tyne from the earliest records to its formation as a city. London: Walter Scott Ltd.
- Christie, Rev James (1904). Northumberland: Its History, Its Features, and Its People (2nd ed.). Carlisle: Chas. Thurnam & Sons.
- Clark, Andrew (2002). The People's History - Sunderland Shipyards. Seaham: The People's History Ltd. ISBN 1-902527-00-3.
- Colls, Robert; Lancaster, Bill (2001). Newcastle upon Tyne. A Modern History. Chichester: Phillimore & Co Ltd. ISBN 1-86077-167-X.
- Cuthbert, Jim; Smith, Ken (2004). Palmers of Jarrow. Newcastle upon Tyne: Tyne Bridge Publishing. ISBN 1857951964.
- Dodds, Glen Lyndon (2011). A History of Sunderland (Third ed.). Sunderland: Albion Press. ISBN 978-0-9525122-2-6.
- Donaghy, Peter; Laidler, John (2012). Discovering NewcastleGateshead. Ammanford: Sigma Leisure. ISBN 978-1-85058-913-6.
- Dougan, David (1968). The History of North East Shipbuilding. London: George Allen & Unwin.
- Elson, Peter (1986). Tyneside Shipbuilding 1920-1960. Newcastle upon Tyne: Newcastle City Libraries. ISBN 0-902653-38-5.
- Flowers, Anna; Histon, Vanessa (1999). Water Under the Bridges, Newcastle's Twentieth Century. Newcastle upon Tyne: Tyne Bridge Publishing. ISBN 1-85795-140-9.
- Fraser, CM; Emsley, K (1973). Tyneside. Newton Abbot: David & Charles. ISBN 0-7153-5764-6.
- Grundy, John (2022). History of Northumberland. Newcastle upon Tyne: Tyne Bridge Publishing. ISBN 9781838280970.
- Hawkes, Jane (1996). The Golden Age of Northumbria. Morpeth: Sandhill Press. ISBN 0-946098-43-3.
- Hearnshaw, FJC (1971). Newcastle-Upon-Tyne. Wakefield: SR Publishers Ltd. ISBN 0-85409-683-3.
- Manders, Frank; Potts, Richard (2004). Crossing the Tyne. Nwcastle upon Tyne: Tyne Bridge Publishing. ISBN 1857951212.
- Middlebrook, Sydney (1968). Newcastle upon Tyne. Its Growth and Achievement. Wakefield: S.R. Publishers ltd.
- Newton, Diana; Pollard, AJ (2009). Newcastle and Gateshead before 1700. Chichester: Phillimore & Co Ltd. ISBN 978-1-86077-579-6.
- Rendel, G. Daphne (1898). Newcastle-on -Tyne. Its Municipal Origin and Growth. London: Edward Arnold.
- Rowland, Harry (1979). Looking Around Northumberland. Harry Rowland.
- Smailes, AE (1960). North England. Edinburgh: Thomas Nelson & Sons Ltd.
- Smith, Ken; Rae, Ian (1995). Built with Pride: Tyne ships 1969-1994. Newcastle upon Tyne: Newcastle upon Tyne City Libraries & Arts. ISBN 1-85795-091-7.
- Taylor, David (2022). 111 Places in Newcastle That You Shouldn't Miss (2nd ed.). Germany: Emons Verlag GmbH. ISBN 978-3-7408-1043-6.
- Taylor, Simon; Lovie, David B (2004). Gateshead. Architecture in a changing English urban landscape. London: English Heritage. ISBN 1-873592-76-0.
- Tomlinson, William Weaver (1920). Comprehensive Guide to the County of Northumberland (10th ed.). London: The Walter Scott Publishing Co Ltd.
- Walker, Robert Fulton (1976). The Origins of Newcastle upon Tyne. Newcastle upon Tyne: Thorne's Students' Bookshop Ltd.
- Webb, Jonathan CK (2009). Tyneside from the Air. Derby: Breedon Books Publishing Co Ltd. ISBN 9781-85983-683-5.
- Woodcock, Roger (1990). Tyneside Cunarders. Newcastle upon Tyne: Newcastle upon Tyne City Libraries & Arts. ISBN 0-902653-89-X.
