= Timeline of Sunderland =

The following is a timeline of the history of the city of Sunderland in Tyne and Wear, England

== 7th century ==
- 674 CE
  - Building of St. Peter's Church.

== 11th century ==
- 1069
  - Edgar Ætheling sailed for Scotland from Wearmouth.

== 12th century ==
- 1183
  - Bishop Hugh du Puiset's charter creates the first Borough of Sunderland

== 14th century ==
- 1346
  - Thomas Menvill paid Bishop Hatfield an annual rent of 2s to build ships at Hendon, Sunderland (according to a 1697 copy of a document dated 1346)

== 17th century ==
=== 1630s ===
- 1634
  - Bishop Morton's Charter created Sunderland's first Mayor and Corporation.

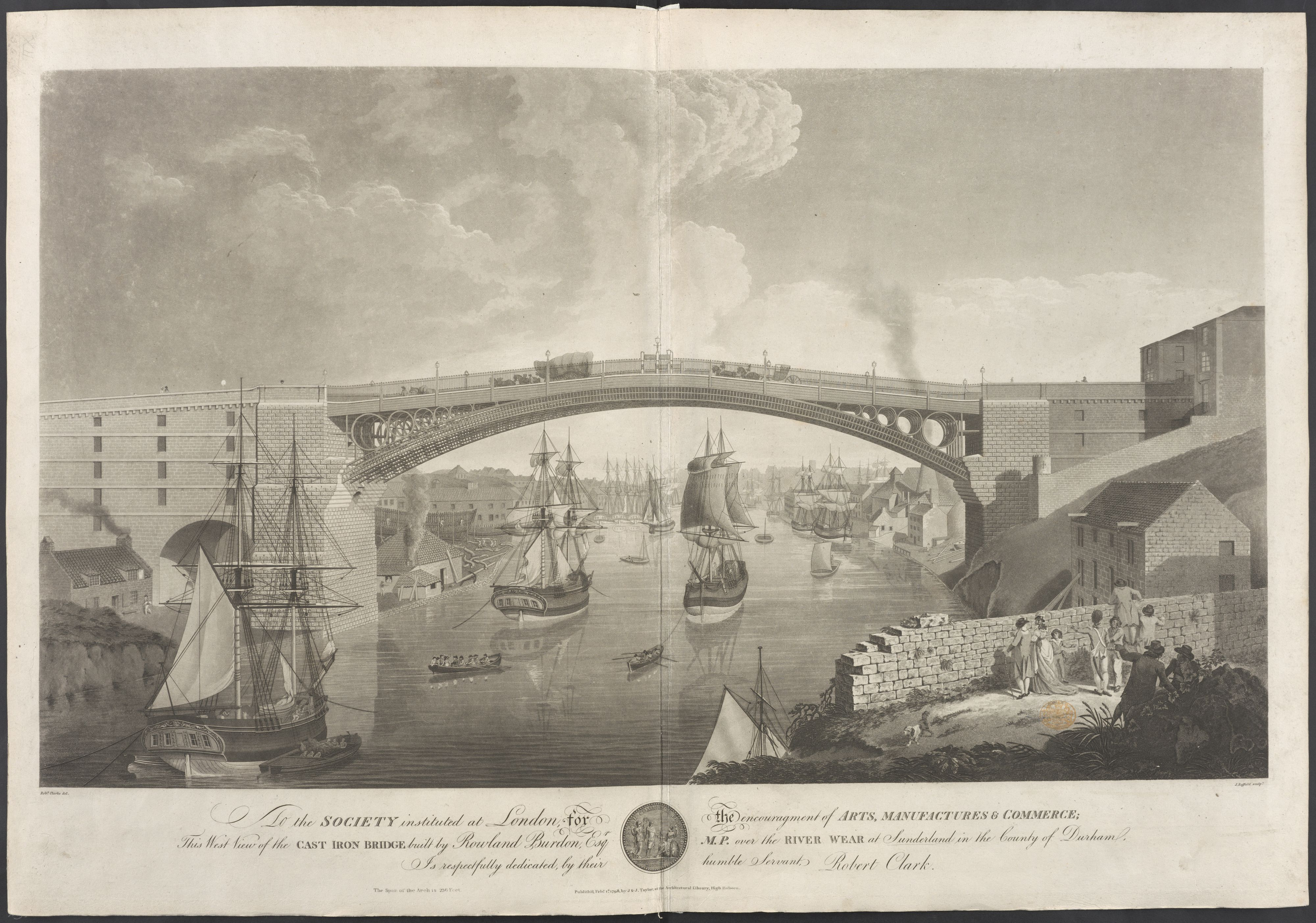
West View of the Cast Iron Bridge over the River Wear at Sunderland

=== 1640s ===
- Local shipbuilders included Frances Readhead and Roger Thornton at Bishopwearmouth Panns

=== 1660s ===
- 1669
  - Letters patent permitted the erection of a pier and lighthouse.

=== 1670s ===
- 1672
  - The Goodchilds of Pallion, a local landowning family, built small ships to transport lime produced in their kilns

=== 1690s ===
- 1698
  - Formation of Sunderland Company of Glassmakers

== 18th century ==
=== 1710s ===
- 1717
  - The River Wear Commission was established to improve the river
- 1719
  - Sunderland Parish's Holy Trinity Church opened

=== 1790s ===
- 1793
  - John and Philip Laing from Fife established a shipyard at Monkwearmouth Shore
- 1795
  - Birth of Sir Henry Havelock at Ford Hall in Bishopwearmouth.
- 1796
  - Wearmouth Bridge was opened, a cast iron bridge over the River Wear at Sunderland

== 19th century ==
=== 1800s ===
- 1801
  - The population of the Borough of Sunderland was 25,000
- 1807
  - Luke Crown started a shipyard at Monkwearmouth Shore

=== 1810s ===
- 1816
  - Robert Surtees stated that 'In shipbuilding the Port of Sunderland stands at present the highest in the United Kingdom'
- 1818
  - Philip Laing opened a shipyard at Deptford yard in Sunderland

=== 1820s ===
- 1822
  - Opening of the railway line from Hetton to Sunderland coal staithes, one of the earliest uses of locomotive power. The engineer was George Stephenson.
- 1826
  - 15 June: Birth of Harry Watts, a Sunderland diver who rescued over 40 people from drowning – and assisted in the rescue of another 120 people.
  - Sinking of Wearmouth Colliery
  - Peter Austin (SP Austin & Sons) opened a shipyard at Monkwearmouth Shore

=== 1830s ===
- 1831
  - October: the first UK outbreak of cholera occurred in Sunderland – 200 people died.
- 1832
  - Sunderland became a parliamentary borough under the Reform Act, returning two members of Parliament.
- 1835
  - St Mary's Church, Sunderland completed.
  - The Borough of Sunderland was created from the townships of Monkwearmouth and Bishopwearmouth and the parish of Sunderland
- 1837
  - North Dock was opened
  - George Bartram and John Lister started a shipbuilding yard at South Hylton
- 1838
  - William Pickersgill with Messrs Miller, Rawson and Watson began shipbuilding at the North Dock

=== 1840s ===
- 1840
  - There were 76 shipyards on the Wear and 251 ships were constructed totaling 64,446 tons
  - William Doxford founded his shipbuilding company and started building ships at Cox Green
- 1843
  - James Laing, son of Philip Laing, took over the company as James Laing & Sons
- 1845
  - William Pickersgill split from his partners and developed a shipyard at Southwick
- 1846
  - SP Austin and Sons moved their ship yard across the river to a site near Wearmouth Bridge
  - Robert Thompson and his three sons began shipbuilding at North Sands and built their first ship in 11 weeks
- 1848
  - George Thomas Clark established an engineering works in Sunderland

=== 1850s ===
- 1850
  - South Docks opened by George Hudson MP
  - George Short established a shipbuilding yard
- 1851
  - The population of the Borough of Sunderland was 64,000
- 1852
  - 27 February:Loftus of 77 tons, the first iron ship built on the Wear, was launched, constructed by George Thomas Clark and John Barkes
- 1853
  - Amity, iron ship of 479 tons, was built by Laings
- 1854
  - Robert Thompson (junior) opened his own shipyard
- 1856
  - Birth of Sir William Mills, (1856 – 1932) inventor of the WW1 Mills bomb
- 1857
  - William Doxford moved his shipbuilding yard to Pallion
- 1858
  - The tongue of 'Big Ben' was forged at Hopper's foundry, Houghton
  - Wearmouth Bridge widened under the direction of Robert Stephenson.

=== 1860s ===
- 1860
  - Robert Thompson died and his son Joseph Lowes Thompson took over the shipbuilding company
- 1868
  - South Docks were extended
- 1869
  - Short Brothers of Sunderland moved their shipyard to Pallion

=== 1870s ===
- 1871
  - Bartrams moved from South Hylton to South Dock and were known as Bartram & Haswell after the owners, RA Bartram (son of George Bartram) and George Haswell
- 1873
  - Sunderland Echo established by the Storey family
- 1874
  - James Williams Street school was built, the first school erected by the Sunderland School Board
- 1875
  - A record of 64 days was set for the run to Australia by the Wear built sailing vessel The Torrens. Launched in 1875, the novelist Joseph Conrad served on her for a time as mate
  - Joseph Lowes Thompson died and his three sons took over the shipbuilding company, J. L. Thompson and Sons
- 1879
  - Sunderland Central Library and Museum opened
  - Wearmouth Junction Railway was established
  - Sunderland A.F.C. was founded by Thomas Allen as Sunderland and District Teachers Association Football Club
  - Sunderland station opened

=== 1880s ===
- 1880
  - Coppermine was built by William Pickersgill, the last wooden ship built on the Wear
  - William Pickersgill was killed in an accident at his shipyard
- 1882
  - William Doxford died
- 1888
  - Sunderland granted County Borough status
- 1889
  - George Haswell retired from shipbuilders Bartram & Haswell and RA Bartram was joined by his two sons to form Bartram & Sons

=== 1890s ===
- 1890
  - Sunderland Town Hall was opened
- 1891
  - Population: 131,686.
  - William Doxford & Sons shipbuilding company formed by William Doxford's sons, William Theodore, Alfred, Robert and Charles
- 1892
  - Sunderland A.F.C. win the Football League Championship
- 1893
  - Sunderland A.F.C. win the Football League Championship
- 1895
  - Sunderland A.F.C. win the Football League Championship
  - Marks & Spencer established a store in Sunderland
- 1897
  - James Laing was knighted
- 1898
  - Roker Park became the home of Sunderland A.F.C.
  - James Laing changed the company name to Sir James Laing & Sons

== 20th century ==
=== 1900s ===
- 1900
  - Sunderland Corporation Tramways started.
- 1901
  - The population of the Borough of Sunderland was 146,077
  - Only 6% of men in the borough were born outside England and Wales
  - Sunderland Technical College was established
- 1902
  - Sunderland A.F.C. win the Football League Championship
- 1903
  - 28 May: Pontoon opened at SP Austin & Sons yard enabling the docking of ships of up to 400ft in length. The pontoon was built by Swan Hunter at Wallsend
  - Harriston's Buildings, Sunderland's first councl houses, were built
  - Roker Pier – the harbour's northern breakwater is opened at 2,790 feet long.
- 1904
  - William Doxford & Sons doubled their capacity to build ships with the opening of the East Yard with three new berths
  - Doxfords recorded the highest production of any shipyard in the world
- 1907
  - Doxfords again recorded the highest production of any shipyard in the world
  - Sir James Laing died
  - St Andrew's Church, Roker was completed, 'The Cathedral of the Arts and Crafts movement'
- 1909
  - Queen Alexandra Bridge opened to provide road and rail links between Pallion and Southwick

=== 1910s ===
- 1913
  - Sunderland AFC win the Football League Championship
- 1915
  - Newman Richardson became the first member of the Jewish community elected to the town council
- 1917
  - 15 June: King George V and Queen Mary visited Sunderland touring all the main shipyards

=== 1920s ===
- 1923
  - Police Boxes, model for the TARDIS pioneered by Chief Constable Frederick Crawley
- 1928
  - Fulwell and Southwick Urban District Councils were incorporated into the county borough

=== 1930s ===
- 1931
  - The population of the Borough of Sunderland was 185,000 (after the incorporation of Fulwell and Southwick)
- 1932-62
  - George McIntire was Town Clerk of Sunderland
- 1934
  - Corporation Quay was opened, financed by Sunderland Council and engineered and managed by the River Wear Commission
- 1936
  - Sunderland A.F.C. win the Football League Championship
  - A survey showed that over 20% of families in Sunderland were living in overcrowded conditions, compared to a 3.8% national average
- 1937
  - Sunderland A.F.C. won the FA Cup
  - The Garths, the first public housing constructed by the North East Housing Association, were built

=== 1940s ===
- 1940
  - 26 July: SS Balzac a Norwegian steamer, hit a mine after leaving port in Sunderland and sank, with 6 fatalities
- 1941
  - August: The Government decided to use Sunderland Corporation Quay for handling cargoes of war materials
  - German bombing destroyed part of Fawcett Street and Binns department store
- 1943
  - The Government decided to use a berth at South Docks for handing government cargoes
- 1945
  - 26 July: General Election results announced for Sunderland, with Fred Willey and Richard Ewart of the Labour Party replacing Samuel Storey and Stephen Furness
  - August: The first council 'temporary' house was completed in Hendon
  - 1 November: Municipal elections saw the Labour Party win 43 seats and others 29 seats. A further 9 Labour councillors were added as aldermen for each ward
  - John Young was Mayor of Sunderland
- 1946
  - 30 April: Princess Elizabeth visited Sunderland to open the Sunderland Eye Infirmary and to launch the British Princess at James Laing & Sons
- 1949
  - Aneurin Bevan, Minister of Health, and responsible for housing, opened the 3,000th council house in Sunderland

=== 1950s ===
- 1951
  - The population of the Borough of Sunderland was 181,000
  - The United Kingdom Census showed that 43% of Sunderland households either shared or were entirely without piped water and 52% had no fixed bath
- 1952
  - Binns department store reopened on the west side of Fawcett Street
- 1953
  - The Sunderland Directory recorded 1 accountant, 4 dentists, 12 doctors and 3 solicitors as being from the Jewish community
  - Binns department store was acquired by House of Fraser
- 1954
  - 14 December: Joplings High Street premises were destroyed by fire
  - SP Austin & Sons merged with William Pickersgill & Sons Ltd to form Austin & Pickersgill and redeveloped the Southwick yard
  - 1 October: Sunderland Corporation Tramways operated their last tram service
- 1956
  - Joplings opened a new department store in John Street, the first in Sunderland with an escalator
- 1957
  - Steam powered Sunderland ferry boats ceased operations
  - The rowing boat ferry between North Hylton and South Hylton ceased operations
- 1958
  - The rowing boat ferry at Cox Green was replaced by a footbridge
- 1959
  - Sunderland Empire Theatre was purchased by Sunderland Council, the first theatre in the country to be acquired by a council
  - The Junior Technical College in Villiers Street moved to Ryhope Road to become Southmoor School

=== 1960s ===
- 1960
  - Fred Willey, MP, opened the 15,000th council house built in Sunderland
- 1961
  - Only 2.4% of the population was recorded as being born outside England and Wales
- 1962
  - A municipal abattoir was built in Fulwell replacing 15 slaughterhouses
- 1963
  - Hylton Red House School, the first purpose-built comprehensive school in Sunderland, was opened
- 1964
  - 24 June: Extended Central Library and Museum was opened by Queen Elizabeth the Queen Mother
  - Short Brothers of Sunderland shipyard was closed with the loss of 300 jobs
  - The first multi-storey flats were completed in Sunderland
  - Sunderland Technical College expanded and opened a campus on Chester Road
- 1965
  - Gordon Bagier, MP, opened the 20,000th council house in Sunderland. Compared to this only 4,000 private houses had been built by this date
- 1966
  - A flat fare system was introduced on Sunderland Corporation buses
- 1967
  - 6 January: Barbara Castle, Minister of Transport, officially inaugurated the flat fare system on Sunderland Corporation buses
  - Ryhope, Silksworth, Tunstall, East & Middle Herrington, South Hylton, part of Offerton, Castletown and Whitburn South Bents added to the County Borough of Sunderland
  - Bartram & Sons shipbuilders was taken over by Austin & Pickersgill
- 1969
  - Sunderland Technical & Art Colleges merged to form Sunderland Polytechnic (now the University of Sunderland)

=== 1970s ===
- 1970
  - Opening of new Basil Spence-designed Sunderland Civic Centre by the Princess Margaret
- 1971
  - Sunderland Town Hall demolished
  - The demolition of the East Yard of Doxfords was started
- 1973
  - 1 October: Demolition of Doxford's East Yard was completed
  - Sunderland A.F.C. win the FA Cup for the second time
- 1974
  - Washington, Hetton-le-Hole and Houghton-le-Spring become part of the new Borough of Sunderland
- 1976
  - 8 April: Court Shipbuilding Group officially opened a new covered shipbuilding hall, replacing Doxford's East Yard
  - 26 May: Cedarbank, the first ship to be built at the new Court Shipbuilding Group yard, was launched
- 1978
  - First Wearside Jack hoax letter sent to West Yorkshire Police
  - The former Bartram & Sons shipyard was closed

=== 1980s ===
- 1984
  - Nissan chose Sunderland for their new European manufacturing base
- 1986
  - Abolition of Tyne and Wear County Council increases Sunderland Council's powers and duties
- 1988
  - Announcement of closure of the shipyards on Wearside

=== 1990s ===
- 1992
  - The City of Sunderland was created a by the Queen on 23 March
- 1993
  - The Queen and the Duke of Edinburgh visit Sunderland to unveil the city's new coat of arms
- 1997
  - Stadium of Light opens

== 21st century ==
=== 2000s ===
- 2001
  - The entire council housing stock of 39,000 homes is transferred to private landlord Gentoo after a referendum of tenants found 95% support in favour of the move
- 2008
  - Sunderland Aquatic Centre opens, the only Olympic-sized pool between Glasgow and Leeds, on a site adjacent to the Stadium of Light

== See also ==
- Timeline of shipbuilding on the River Wear
- Timeline of County Durham
- Timeline of Tyne and Wear

== Sources ==
- Clark, Andrew (2002). The People's History - Sunderland Shipyards. Seaham: The People's History Ltd. ISBN 1-902527-00-3.
- Dodds, Glen Lyndon (2011). A History of Sunderland (Third ed.). Sunderland: Albion Press. ISBN 978-0-9525122-2-6.
- Sinclair, Neil T (2004). Sunderland. City and People since 1945. Derby: Breedon Books Publishing Co Ltd. ISBN 1 85983 404 3.
- Smailes, AE (1960). North England. Edinburgh: Thomas Nelson & Sons Ltd.
