= Timeline of shipbuilding on the River Wear =

The following is a timeline of the history of shipbuilding on the River Wear in Tyne and Wear, England.

== 14th century ==
=== 1340s ===
- 1346
  - Thomas Menvill paid Bishop Hatfield an annual rent of 2s to build ships at Hendon, Sunderland (according to a 1697 copy of a document dated 1346)

== 17th century ==
=== 1640s ===
- Local shipbuilders included Frances Readhead and Roger Thornton at Bishopwearmouth Panns

=== 1670s ===
- 1672
  - The Goodchilds of Pallion, a local landowning family, built small ships to transport lime produced in their kilns

== 18th century ==
=== 1740s ===
- 1748
  - Duke William of 500 tons built on the Wear

=== 1770s ===
- 1776
  - 150 vessels had been built on the Wear by this year
  - Lloyd's Register included 63 Sunderland built vessels totaling 12,222 tons

=== 1780s ===
- Several shipyards were 'constantly employed' on the Wear, including that of Thomas Nicholson at Bishopwearmouth Panns
- 1781-82
  - Achilles and Bucephalus, warships, built by Messrs Thomas Dixon and James Stafford at Monkwearmouth Shore

=== 1790s ===
- 1793
  - John and Philip Laing from Fife established a shipyard at Monkwearmouth Shore
- 1798
  - 2 March: Lord Duncan of 925 tons launched at Southwick, Sunderland

== 19th century ==
=== 1800s ===
- 1800
  - 12,662 tons of shipping was launched on the Wear, exceeding the output on the River Tyne
- 1807
  - Luke Crown started a shipyard at Monkwearmouth Shore

=== 1810s ===
- 1816
  - Robert Surtees stated that 'In shipbuilding the Port of Sunderland stands at present the highest in the United Kingdom'
- 1818
  - John and Philip Laing moved their shipyard from Monkwearmouth Shore to Deptford yard in Sunderland
- 1819
  - The partnership of John and Philip Laing ended, with John Laing retaining the company

=== 1820s ===
- 1825
  - The output of shipbuilding on the Wear was 21,000 tons
- 1826
  - Peter Austin (SP Austin & Sons) opened a shipyard at Monkwearmouth Shore

=== 1830s ===
- 1837
  - George Bartram and John Lister started a shipbuilding yard at South Hylton
- 1838
  - Bertram and Lister launched their first ship
  - William Pickersgill with Messrs Miller, Rawson and Watson began shipbuilding at the North Dock

=== 1840s ===
- 1840
  - William Doxford founded his shipbuilding company and started building ships at Cox Green
  - There were 76 shipyards on the Wear and 251 ships were constructed totaling 64,446 tons
- 1841
  - William Doxford went bankrupt
  - 3,100 shipwrights were employed on the Wear
- 1842
  - Only 1000 shipwrights remained on the Wear
- 1842-43
  - A sharp depression saw many yards fail on the Wear
- 1843
  - Only 31 shipyards remained on the Wear and total tonnage launched was 21,377 tons
  - James Laing, son of Philip Laing, took over the company as James Laing & Sons
- 1845
  - William Pickersgill split from his partners and developed a shipyard at Southwick
  - William Doxford resumed construction of ships
  - Experiment, was the first steam-powered sea-going ship built in Sunderland. The shipbuilder was T Rountree, with engines from South Shields
- 1846
  - SP Austin and Sons moved their yard across the river to a site near Wearmouth Bridge
  - Robert Thompson and his three sons began shipbuilding at North Sands and built their first ship in 11 weeks
  - Sunderland shipwrights formed a trade union
- 1848
  - George Thomas Clark established an engineering works in Sunderland

=== 1850s ===
- 1850
  - Over 51,000 tons of shipping was launched on the Wear
  - George Short established a shipbuilding yard
- 1851
  - The 1851 United Kingdom census recorded 653 shipwrights under 20 years old in Sunderland, and 1,372 over 20 years old
- 1852
  - 27 February: Loftus of 77 tons, the first iron ship built on the Wear, was launched, constructed by George Thomas Clark and John Barkes
  - John Dickinson & Sons opened an engineering works at Palmer's Hill, near Bonnesfield, Monkwearmouth
- 1854
  - The first ship was launched by the William Pickersgill shipyard at Southwick
  - Robert Thompson (junior) opened his own shipyard
  - George Thomas Clark manufactured the first marine engine built on the Wear
- 1857
  - William Doxford moved his shipbuilding yard from Cox Green to Pallion

=== 1860s ===
- 1860
  - Laings built ten vessels, nine of which were iron ships
  - Robert Thompson died and his son Joseph Lowes Thompson took over the company
- 1864
  - 7 May: City of Adelaide launched at North Sands by Pile, Hay & Company, a composite vessel with an iron frame and wooden hull
  - Doxfords began building iron ships
- 1865-74
  - J. L. Thompson and Sons at Southwick built 18 Composite vessels
- 1869
  - Short Brothers of Sunderland moved their shipyard to Pallion

=== 1870s ===
- 1871
  - Bartrams moved from South Hylton to South Dock and were known as Bartram & Haswell after the owners, RA Bartram (son of George Bartram) and George Haswell
- 1875
  - Joseph Lowes Thompson died and his three sons took over the company, J. L. Thompson and Sons
  - Torrens, a clipper ship and composite vessel, was launched by Laing's
- 1878
  - Doxfords opened an engine works to supply their own vessels

=== 1880s ===
- 1880
  - Coppermine was built by William Pickersgill, the last wooden ship built on the Wear
  - William Pickersgill was killed in an accident at his shipyard
- 1882
  - William Doxford died
- 1883
  - Doxfords built four steel ships
  - Shipbuilding output on the Wear was 212,313 tons
- 1884
  - Shipbuilding output on the Wear was less than 100,000 tons
- 1887
  - Robert Thompson's shipyard at Southwick did not launch any vessels
- 1889
  - George Haswell retired from Bartram & Haswell and RA Bartram was joined by his two sons to form Bartram & Sons

=== 1890s ===
- 1891
  - William Doxford & Sons shipbuilding company formed by William Doxford's sons, William Theodore, Alfred, Robert and Charles
- 1893
  - Margarita, was launched by William Pickersgill Jnr and was the last sailing ship built on the Wear
- 1897
  - James Laing was knighted
- 1898
  - James Laing changed the company name to Sir James Laing & Sons

== 20th century ==
=== 1900s ===
- 1903
  - 28 May: Pontoon opened at SP Austin & Sons yard enabling the docking of ships of up to 400ft in length. The pontoon was built by Swan Hunter at Wallsend
- 1904
  - William Doxford & Sons doubled their capacity to build ships with the opening of the East Yard with three new berths and the shipyard was 32 acres in extent
  - Doxfords recorded the highest production of any shipyard in the world
- 1906
  - Shipbuilding output on the Wear was 365,951 tons, the peak year, with 12,672 people employed
- 1907
  - Doxfords again recorded the highest production of any shipyard in the world
  - Sir James Laing died
- 1908
  - Shipbuilding output on the Wear was 92,022 tons with 4,068 people employed

=== 1910s ===
- 1912
  - Sir James Marr became chairman of Laings
- 1913
  - Gifford launched by Doxfords for the Bank Line
- 1917
  - 15 June: King George V and Queen Mary visited Sunderland touring all the main shipyards

=== 1920s ===
- 1920
  - Vessels totaling 318,000 gross registered tons were launched on the Wear
  - The 15 shipyards on the Wear launched 333,335 gross tons of shipping
- 1921
  - Output of ships on the Wear fell to less than half the previous year
- 1923
  - Output on the Wear was 17 ships grossing 56,522 tons and five shipyards launched nothing at all
- 1926
  - Output on the Wear was eight ships totaling 36,979 tons and eight yards launched no vessels at all
- 1927
  - 10 November: Stonegate launched by William Doxford & Sons, the first launch at the yard in three years

=== 1930s ===
- 1930-34
  - Doxfords shipyard launched no ships
- 1931
  - Output on the Wear was seven ships totaling 8,814 tons
  - The 1931 United Kingdom census recorded 2,375 as employed in shipbuilding in Sunderland, but 11,794 former colleagues were unemployed
- 1932
  - Output on the Wear was 2 colliers totaling 2,628 tons
- 1933
  - J. L. Thompson and Sons shipyard at Southwick was closed
- 1934
  - May: Doxfords shipyard was reopened
- 1938
  - Output on the Wear was 35 ships grossing 169,898 tons
- 1939
  - Only nine contracts were in hand at shipyards on the Wear and only four shipyards were open
- 1939-1944
  - William Doxford & Sons built 71 vessels totaling 481, 601 gross tonnage
  - J. L. Thompson and Sons built 40 vessels totaling 277,697 gross tonnage
  - Sir James Laing & Sons built 30 vessels totaling 230,523 gross tonnage
  - Short Brothers built 27 vessels totaling 179,002 gross tonnage
  - Bartram & Sons built 19 vessels totaling 127,756 gross tonnage
  - W Pickersgill & Sons built 20 vessels totaling 116,814 gross tonnage
  - SP Austion & Son built 26 vessels totaling 56,916 gross tonnage
  - Shipbuilding Corporation built 4 vessels totaling 28,342 gross tonnage
  - John Crown & Sons built 8 vessels totaling 3,688 gross tonnage
- 1939-45
  - 245 merchant ships totalling 1,502,000 tons were built on the Wear, 27% of the entire output of all yards in the United Kingdom

=== 1940s ===
- 1941
  - Lady Churchill visited a number of shipyards during a visit to Sunderland
- 1943
  - 8 April:King George VI visited J. L. Thompson and Sons shipyard during a visit to Sunderland
  - Wear Shipbuilders Ltd launched their first vessel at Southwick, one of nine yards then open on the Wear
  - The Admiralty decided to establish a fitting out facility at Hendon Dock
- 1944
  - Fitting out base at Hendon Dock was opened. In total 13 ships were fitted out there and 20 other naval craft used the facility for repairs before the end of the War
- 1945
  - There were nine shipyards operating on the Wear
- 1946
  - 30 April: Princess Elizabeth visited Sunderland to open the Sunderland Eye Infirmary and to launch the British Princess at James Laing & Sons
  - July: Rovuma launched by Bartram & Sons
- 1947
  - Lord Glanely launched at Pickersgills
- 1947-56
  - A yearly average of 218,000 tons of shipping was launched from the Wear
- 1948
  - 22 April: Arraiolos launched by Bartram & Sons

=== 1950s ===
- 1951
  - Caltex Tanganyika launched at Doxfords
  - 20.6% of the male population of Sunderland aged 15 or over were engaged in shipbuilding or repairing
  - Rondefjell, 23,000 ton oil tanker, built by Crown's in two parts before being joined together in a dry dock on the Tyne
- 1953
  - 21 December: HMS Kedleston, a minesweeper, was launched by Pickersgills, the first naval ship built on the Wear since World War II
- 1954
  - 5 April: Baron Ardrossan launched at Pickersgills for H Hogarth & Sons
  - 28 June: Welsh Trader, the first prefabricated ship built at Pickersgills, was launched
  - SP Austin & Sons merged with William Pickersgill & Sons Ltd to form Austin & Pickersgill and redeveloped the Southwick yard
  - Laings and Thompsons merged
- 1955
  - 4 April: Vigrafjord launched by Short Brothers of Sunderland
  - 18 August: Sir Johnstone Wright, a collier, was launched by Austin & Pickersgill for the Central Electricity Authority
  - 19 August: Troutpool launched by J. L. Thompson and Sons
  - 22 August: Despina C launched by Bartram & Sons
- 1958
  - Baron Kinnaird built at Austin & Pickersgill, the second wholly prefabricated ship built at the Southwick yard
  - Shipbuilding reached a post-war peak with 268,000 tons of shipping produced

=== 1960s ===
- 1961
  - Doxfords became part of Sunderland Shipbuilders Ltd, joining the already merged Laings and Thompsons
- 1962
  - 4 May: Barbara launched by Laings
  - 19 June: British Cavalier launched by J. L. Thompson and Sons
  - 25 October: World Explorer, a bulk carrier, launched by Short Brothers of Sunderland
- 1964
  - Short Brothers of Sunderland shipyard at Pallion was closed with the loss of 300 jobs and was subsequently demolished
  - Austin's former shipyard on the south bank of the Wear below Wearmouth Bridge was closed
- 1967
  - December: Nicola, the first SD14 (shelterdecker of 14,000 tons dwt) launched by Austin & Pickersgill at Southwick yard
  - Bartram & Sons was taken over by Austin & Pickersgill and began to build SD14s
- 1968
  - 14 February: Syrie, an SD14, was launched by Austin & Pickersgill
  - Bartram & Sons amalgamated with Austin & Pickersgill

=== 1970s ===
- 1972
  - The demolition of the East Yard of Doxfords was started
  - Naess Crusader, a bulk ore carrier, was built by Sunderland Shipbuilders Ltd
- 1973
  - 1 October: Demolition of Doxford's East Yard was completed
  - Sunderland Shipbuilders Ltd was acquired by Court Line
- 1975
  - Court Line collapsed and Sunderland Shipbuilders Ltd was taken into public ownership
- 1976
  - 8 April: Court Shipbuilding Group officially opened a new covered shipbuilding hall, replacing Doxford's East Yard
  - 26 May: Cedarbank, the first ship to be built at the new Court Shipbuilding Group yard, was launched
- 1977
  - Austin & Pickersgill taken into public ownership and the Wear shipbuilders came under the umbrella of British Shipbuilders
- 1978
  - The former Bartram & Sons shipyard was closed
- 1979
  - 26 April: Troutbank launched by Laings for the Bank Line
  - After the launch of the Badagry Palm by Sunderland Shipbuilders the shipyard at North Sands was mothballed, although Manor Quay continued to be used for outfitting by Doxfords and Laings

=== 1980s ===
- 1980
  - 5 December: MV Murree, the first SD 18 built, was launched by Austin & Pickersgill for the Pakistan National Shipping Corporation
- 1983
  - 17 November: Sunderland Venture, last SD 14 built, launched by Austin & Pickersgill
- 1984
  - May: Fayrouz IV fitted out by Austin & Pickersgill
  - 30 July: Colima launched by Laings
- 1985
  - 3 May: Mitla launched by Laings, the last ship to be built there
- 1986
  - 1 April: The Wear shipyards were privatised, merged, and became North East Shipbuilders Ltd
  - The North Sands yard was reopened to build the crane ship Challenger
- 1988
  - 7 December: Shipyards on the River Wear were closed
  - 21 December: The last ship built on the Wear was launched

=== 1990s ===
- 1991
  - Austin & Pickersgills ahipbuilding complex was demolished
  - July: Pallion shipyard acquired by Pallion Engineering Ltd

== See also ==
- History of Tyne and Wear
- Timeline of Sunderland
- Timeline of shipbuilding on the River Tyne

== Sources ==
- Clark, Andrew (2002). The People's History - Sunderland Shipyards. Seaham: The People's History Ltd. ISBN 1-902527-00-3.
- Dodds, Glen Lyndon (2011). A History of Sunderland (Third ed.). Sunderland: Albion Press. ISBN 978-0-9525122-2-6.
- Johnman, Lewis; Murphy, Hugh (2002). British Shipbuilding and the State since 1918. Exeter: University of Exeter Press. ISBN 0-85989-606-4.
- Sinclair, Neil T (2004). Sunderland. City and People since 1945. Derby: Breedon Books Publishing Co Ltd. ISBN 1 85983 404 3.
