= Timeline of Gateshead =

The following is a timeline of the history of Gateshead in Tyne and Wear, England (before 1974 it was part of County Durham)

== 2nd Century ==
- 120-122
  - Pons Aelius a small Roman fort and bridge (linking to the Gateshead side of the River Tyne) was established in what is now Newcastle upon Tyne

== 7th century ==
=== 650s ===
- 653
  - Bede's 'History of the English Church and People' refers to a monastery at Gateshead under Abbot Utta

== 9th century ==
=== 870s ===
- 875
  - Vikings under Halfdan Ragnarsson sailed into the River Tyne and sacked monasteries at Tynemouth and Jarrow, before anchoring at the mouth of the River Team in Gateshead

== 11th century ==
- 1080
  - A church near the site of the current St Mary's Church was burned down by an angry mob with Walcher, the first Norman Bishop of Durham, inside, according to Symeon of Durham

== 12th century ==
- 1164
  - Hugh de Puiset, Bishop of Durham, granted borough rights to his forest at Gateshead

== 13th century ==
=== 1240s ===
- 1242
  - Fire destroyed the wooden bridge over the River Tyne
- 1248
  - After fire destroyed the wooden bridge over the River Tyne, and much of the borough, a new stone bridge was eventually constructed

=== 1250s ===
- 1255
  - Walter of Kirkham, Bishop of Durham granted an indulgence of 20 days to anyone who would contribute to the repair of the bridge over the Tyne
- 1257
  - The Archbishop of York granted an indulgence of 30 days to anyone contributing to repair of the bridge over the Tyne

== 14th century ==
=== 1330s ===
- 1339
  - A flood swept away the greater part of the stone bridge at between Gateshead and Newcastle and killed 167 people

=== 1340s ===
- 1344
  - Coal mining was commenced in Gateshead
- 1349
  - Wharves were constructed at Pipewellgate

=== 1380s ===
  - The Bishop of Hatfield's survey showed that the manor of Gateshead, originally held by the bishop, had been let

== 16th century ==
=== 1550s ===
- 1553
  - 30 March: Newcastle secured an Act in Parliament incorporating Gateshead into Newcastle, later repealed
- 1554
  - 2 April: An Act of Parliament was passed to re-establish the Bishopric of Durham including Gateshead
  - The Bishop of Durham had to cede quayside facilities in Gateshead to the mayor and corporation of Newcastle

=== 1570s ===
- 1576
  - Newcastle petitioned the Crown for possession of Gateshead on the grounds of the disorder across the river

=== 1590s ===
- 1594
  - Seminary priest John Ingram was executed in Gateshead and his quartered body was brought to Newcastle

== 17th century ==
=== 1640s ===
- 1644
  - 13 August: While Newcastle was besieged by the Scots, Lord Leven was quartered in Elswick and the Earl of Callendar at Gateshead
- 1646
  - King Charles I stayed at an earlier version of the Crown Hotel in Gateshead

=== 1660s ===
- 1663
  - Thomas Liddell built the Ravemsworth waggonway to transport coal along the west side of the Team Valley to a staith at Dunston

== 18th century ==
=== 1740s ===
- 1747
  - The Team Works of the Hawks family opened in Gateshead with a few forges working up old iron brought in as ballast

=== 1750s ===
- 1750
  - Russell was launched by Headlam's yard (Gateshead), the largest vessel built on the Tyne up to that time, able to carry 30 keels of coal

=== 1770s ===
- 1771
  - 17 November: The Great Flood of 1771 saw the collapse of part of the then Tyne Bridge and its eventual demolition
- 1773-81
  - A new bridge over the River Tyne was built, a low stone bridge of nine arches

=== 1780s ===
- 1780
  - £568 was levied from poor rates in Gateshead
- 1781
  - New stone bridge over the River Tyne was completed

== 19th Century ==
=== 1800s ===
- 1801
  - The population of Gateshead was 8,597
  - The bridge over the River Tyne had become too narrow for the volume of traffic and was widened to designs by David Stephenson

=== 1810s ===
- 1814
  - The Inclosure Act of 1814 distinguished at Gateshead between 'townfields' and 'other commonable lands and grounds'
- 1819-24
  - Claremont Place built in phases on land owned by a local iron master, William Hymers

=== 1820s ===
- 1820
  - £4,500 was levied from poor rates in Gateshead
- 1821
  - New rules for poor rates were introduced after protests by ratepayers
- 1822
  - £3,040 was levied from poor rates in Gateshead
- 1824-25
  - St John's Church, Gateshead Fell built in Sheriff Hill

=== 1830s ===
- 1831
  - Cholera outbreak in Gateshead
- 1832
  - 4 May: The Battle of Friar's Goose took place as union supporting miners were evicted
  - Town dispensary built in Nelson Street following the cholera outbreak the previous year
  - The Reform Act resulted in Gateshead gaining its first own Member of Parliament
- 1835
  - Gateshead became a Municipal borough, although its functions were limited to raising rates, upkeep of roads etc, and its elected town council first met in a solicitors office
- 1836
  - Gateshead was placed at the centre of a Poor Law Union
- 1838
  - 18 June: A through railway line from Redheugh to Carlisle was opened
- 1839
  - First Redheugh Bridge was built

=== 1840s ===
- 1840
  - The population of Gateshead was 20,000
  - Two wire ropeworks were opened in the Teams area by RS Newall & Co and Dixon Corbitt
- 1844
  - A house in Greenesfield was acquired and converted into a new Town Hall for Gateshead
  - A passenger railway station was built at Greenesfield
- 1847
  - Work started on construction of the High Level Bridge
- 1848
  - Gateshead Municipal Borough took on responsibility for health
- 1849
  - High Level Bridge over the River Tyne designed by Robert Stephenson was opened

=== 1850s ===
- 1850
  - A 'Report to the General Board of Health...on a Preliminary Inquiry into...the Borough of Gateshead' by Robert Rawlinson criticised the poor housing in Gateshead
  - The River Tyne Improvement Act established a Conservancy Commission to replace the traditional control by Newcastle Council
  - Queen Victoria formally opened the High Level Bridge and Newcastle railway station
- 1851
  - January: Newcastle railway station received its first train from across the High Level Bridge
  - The Great fire of Newcastle and Gateshead followed an explosion and fire at Gateshead, which spread to the Quayside in Newcastle, and killed 53 people, destroyed the homes of 800 families and damaged many properties, clearing a long stretch of river frontage in Gateshead and Newcastle
- 1854
  - The former station at Greenesfield became the locomotive repair works for the North Eastern Railway (NER)
- 1855
  - St Mary's Church was damaged by fire
- 1856
  - Heathfield House was built for the town clerk

=== 1860s ===
- 1860-71
- Saltwell Towers built for Tyneside glass manufacturer William Wailes
- 1861
  - The population of Gateshead was 33,589
  - Windmill Hills became the first public park in Gateshead
- 1863
  - A competition held for the design of a new Town Hall was won by John Johnstone
- 1864
  - Whinney House, Durham Road, was built for the coal-mining Joicey family
- 1866
  - October: William Affleck purchased part of Shipcote for house building
- 1867-70
  - The new Gateshead Town Hall was built in West Street, designed by John Johnstone
- 1868-76
  - The Swing Bridge, River Tyne was constructed by WG Armstrong & Co

=== 1870s ===
- 1870
  - The new Town Hall was opened in West Street, replacing the one built in 1844 in Greenesfield
- 1871
  - Saltwell Towers, a house for William Wailes, was completed
- 1872
  - Gateshead Municipal Borough took on responsibility for sanitary conditions
- 1874
  - Prior Street Junior school was opened
- 1875
  - Alexandra Road schools opened
- 1876
  - The Swing Bridge, River Tyne was opened
  - Saltwell Park was landscaped for public use to designs by WB Kemp and opened to the public
- 1878-80
  - Day Industrial Schools built at Windmill Hills, designed by Thomas Oliver, Jnr

=== 1880s ===
- 1880
  - Sheriff Hill Isolation Hospital built, the first purpose built hospital in Gateshead
- 1881
  - The population of Gateshead was 65,845
- 1882
  - Victoria Road Methodist Church and Sunday School was established
- 1882-85
  - Public library built in Swinburne Street, designed by John Johnstone (architect)
- 1883
  - July: A steam tramway was opened in Gateshead
  - Gateshead Grammar School was opened as a Muncipal Higher Grade school
- 1885
  - Free Public Library opened in Gateshead
- 1886-90
  - The Infirmary for Gateshead Union Workhouse was built
- 1889
  - Gateshead became a County borough

=== 1890s ===
- 1891
  - The population of Gateshead was 85,692
- 1894
  - Brighton Avenue school was opened
- 1899-1900
  - Wrekenton School was built
- 1899
  - United Alkali Company employed 1,200 people

== 20th century ==
=== 1900s ===
- 1900-02
  - Alexander Gillies was Mayor of Gateshead
- 1901
  - May: The steam tramway in Gateshead closed and was replaced by electric trams
- 1902
  - Gateshead Municipal Borough took on responsibility for education
  - Kelvin Grove school was opened
- 1906
  - 10 July: King Edward VII Bridge was opened by King Edward VII, designed by Charles A Harrison
- 1906-07
  - Alexander Gillies was again Mayor of Gateshead
- 1908
  - United Alkali Company employed 1030 people
- 1909
  - The North Eastern Railway locomotive works at Greenesfield was the largest single employer in Gateshead with over 3,300 workers
  - George Black opened the Palace theatre and cinema, with 1,450 seats, on Sunderland Road
  - John Abbot & Co, iron manufacturers in Gateshead, closed
  - Corpus Christi school opened in Dunsmuir Grove

=== 1910s ===
- 1910
  - North Eastern Railway locomotive works moved much of its work to Darlington
- 1911
  - Palace Cinema opened in High Spen
- 1913
  - Coatsworh Picture Hall on Bewick Road opened
- 1914-17
  - Shipley Art Gallery built in on Prince Consort Road, Shipcote, designed by Arthur Stockwell
- 1917
  - Shipley Art Gallery was opened to the public

=== 1920s ===
- 1921-23
  - The first 232 houses were built in Carr Hill
- 1923-27
  - Carr Hill was expanded with the building of a further 342 houses
- 1924
  - 7 August: Newcastle upon Tyne and Gateshead Corporations (Bridge) Act received Royal assent approving construction of the Tyne Bridge
  - The proposal to build a new road bridge over the Tyne was supported by the local labour exchange to provide work for 50,000 unemployed skilled engineers and shipbuilders
- 1925
  - August: Work started on construction of the Tyne Bridge.Jacobean houses on Quayside, Newcastle, were demolished to make way way for the approaches to the bridge.
  - Public library completed on Prince Consort Road
- 1927
  - The last pit in the Gateshead area at Redheugh was closed
- 1927-30
  - School at Carr Hill was built
- 1928
  - 25 February: Upper ends of the arch of the Tyne Bridge closed amid celebrations
  - 10 October: Tyne Bridge officially opened by King George V

=== 1930s ===
- 1932
  - The locomotive works for the NER at Greenesfield was closed
- 1934
  - Gateshead was described by J. B. Priestley as 'nothing better than a huge dingy dormitory'
- 1936
  - 18 May: North Eastern Trading Estates Ltd was formed
  - August: Construction of the Team Valley Trading Estate began, owned by North Eastern Trading Estates Ltd
  - Gateshead Council had built 2,360 houses by this date
  - National housing survey showed Gateshead had 15.8% of the population living in overcrowded conditions
- 1937
  - 29 June: Joicey Road Open-Air School, or The Health School, for 'sickly' children, was opened by the mayor Alderman J White at Joicey Road, Low Fell
- 1939
  - 22 February: Team Valley Trading Estate opened by King George VI
  - June: Construction began on the Queen Elizabeth Hospital, Gateshead
  - Rex Cinema built in Askew Road West

=== 1940s ===
- 1941
  - The Infirmary of the Gateshead Union Workhouse was converted to a general hospital, Bensham Hospital
- 1942
  - In Gateshead, 5,620 people were living in property scheduled for demolition
- 1948
  - March: Queen Elizabeth Hospital, Gateshead was opened
  - A new housing estate was completed by the Council at Highfield and Blue Quarries
- 1949-1955
  - Gateshead Technical College was built

=== 1950s ===
- 1950
  - Baltic Flour Mills on the waterfront was built by Joseph Rank Ltd, designed by Mouchel & Partners
  - Beacon Lough estate of 347 houses was completed
- 1952-54
  - Cedars Green estate of 59 houses was built
- 1954
  - Wrekenton Neighbourhood Unit of 1,372 houses was completed
  - A new building for the Borough Treasurers Department opened in Shipcote as the 'Civic centre first stage'
- 1955
  - August: First multi-storey housing block on Tyneside completed at Barns Close
  - Gateshead International Stadium was built
- 1956
  - Dryden Road Girls Grammar School was opened
- 1958
  - Multi-storey housing opened at Regent Court

=== 1960s ===
- 1960
  - August: Coatsworth Picture Hall on Bewick Street closed
  - The Palace theatre and cinema on Sunderland Road was closed
  - Felling by-pass opened
- 1961
  - Gateshead highway opened
  - Rex Cinema in Askew Road West became a bingo hall
- 1962
  - Multi-storey housing opened at Bensham
  - Trinity Square shopping centre and multi-storey car park were designed by Owen Luder
- 1962-63
  - Multi-storey housing opened at Chandless
- 1963
  - November: Gateshead Grammar School was demolished
  - Palace Cinema in High Spen closed
  - Coatsworth Picture Hall on Bewick Road reopened as a bingo hall
- 1963-64
  - Breckenbeds Middle School, Saltwell Road South, was built
- 1969
  - Trinity Square development was completed

=== 1970s ===
- 1970
  - St Cuthberts Village in Windmill Hills was opened by Prime Minister Harold Wilson
  - Trinity Square multi-storey car park featured in the film Get Carter
- 1971
  - Western by pass opened
- 1972
  - Police headquarters built
- 1973
  - Former Rex Cinema and bingo hall on Askew Road West was demolished
- 1974
  - Gateshead became a Metropolitan borough which included Blaydon, Felling, Ryton, Whickham, Birtley and Lamesley and had a population of 211,333.
- 1975
  - Brendan Foster won the International Cross Country event held Gateshead Riverside Bowl
- 1976
  - Magistrates Court built
  - Work began on construction of the Queen Elizabeth II Metro Bridge
- 1978
  - 1 August: The two sections of the Queen Elizabeth II Metro Bridge were joined in the centre
- 1979
  - 19 October: St Mary's Church was damaged by fire and subsequently restored

=== 1980s ===
- 1981
  - 6 November: Queen Elizabeth II Metro Bridge officially opened by Queen Elizabeth II
  - 15 November: Queen Elizabeth II Metro Bridge and new section of Metro line from Haymarket, Newcastle upon Tyne to Heworth opened to the public, as well as the Gateshead Interchange
  - Central Gateshead had a populaton of 74,644 and was the fourth largest town in County Durham
- 1983
  - New Redheugh Bridge between Gateshead and Newcastle was opened by Diana, Princess of Wales
- 1986
  - October: Metrocentre was opened by Nicholas Ridley, Secretary of State for the Environment
- 1987
  - Gateshead Civic Centre opened in Regent Street

=== 1990s ===
- 1990
  - May: Gateshead Garden Festival was opened by Princess Anne
  - May: Kelvin Grove school was destroyed by fire during demolition
  - November: St Mary's Church handed over to commercial interests
  - 1 December: Blaydon Bridge opened by Queen Elizabeth II
- 1998
  - Angel of the North completed, designed by Antony Gormley
- 1998-1999
  - Baltic Flour Mills demolished to only its facade, to be rebuilt as the Baltic Centre for Contemporary Art

== 21st Century ==
=== 2000s ===
- 2001
  - Gateshead Millennium Bridge was opened
- 2002
  - July: Baltic Centre for Contemporary Art was opened
  - Gateshead Millennium Bridge won the Royal Institute of British Architects Stirling Prize
- 2002-04
  - Sage Gateshead was built, designed by Foster and Partners
- 2006
  - Saltwell Park won its first Green Flag Award and the Civic Trust Park of the Year Award
- 2008
  - Trinity Square shopping centre was demolished

== See also ==
- Timeline of County Durham
- Timeline of Tyne and Wear
- Timeline of shipbuilding on the River Tyne
- Timeline of Newcastle upon Tyne

== Sources ==
- Bruce, John Collingwood (1904). Lectures on Old Newcastle. Newcastle upon Tyne: Andrew Reid & Co Ltd.
- Charleton, Robert John (1899). A History of Newcastle upon Tyne from the earliest records to its formation as a city. London: Walter Scott Ltd.
- Colls, Robert; Lancaster, Bill (2001). Newcastle upon Tyne. A Modern History. Chichester: Phillimore & Co Ltd. ISBN 1-86077-167-X.
- Donaghy, Peter; Laidler, John (2012). Discovering NewcastleGateshead. Ammanford: Sigma Leisure. ISBN 978 1 85058 913 6.
- Dougan, David (1968). The History of North East Shipbuilding. London: George Allen & Unwin.
- Fraser, CM; Emsley, K (1973). Tyneside. Newton Abbot: David & Charles. ISBN 0 7153 5764 6.
- Grundy, John (2022). History of Northumberland. Newcastle upon Tyne: Tyne Bridge Publishing. ISBN 9781838280970.
- Hearnshaw, FJC (1971). Newcastle-Upon-Tyne. Wakefield: SR Publishers Ltd. ISBN 0-85409-683-3.
- Hepplewhite, Peter (2002). Images of England - Newcastle upon Tyne. Stroud: Tempus Publishing Ltd. ISBN 0 7524 1598 0.
- Manders, Frank; Potts, Richard (2004). Crossing the Tyne. Nwcastle upon Tyne: Tyne Bridge Publishing. ISBN 1857951212.
- Middlebrook, Sydney (1968). Newcastle upon Tyne. Its Growth and Achievement. Wakefield: S.R. Publishers ltd.
- Newton, Diana; Pollard, AJ (2009). Newcastle and Gateshead before 1700. Chichester: Phillimore & Co Ltd. ISBN 978-1-86077-579-6.
- Rendel, G. Daphne (1898). Newcastle-on -Tyne. Its Municipal Origin and Growth. London: Edward Arnold.
- Sadler, John; Serdiville, Rosie (2019). The Little Book of Newcastle. Stroud, Gloucestershire: The History Press. ISBN 978-0-7509-9003-5.
- Smailes, AE (1960). North England. Edinburgh: Thomas Nelson & Sons Ltd.
- Taylor, David (2022). 111 Places in Newcastle That You Shouldn't Miss (2nd ed.). Germany: Emons Verlag GmbH. ISBN 978-3-7408-1043-6.
- Taylor, Simon; Lovie, David B (2004). Gateshead. Architecture in a changing English urban landscape. London: English Heritage. ISBN 1 873592 76 0.
- Walker, Robert Fulton (1976). The Origins of Newcastle upon Tyne. Newcastle upon Tyne: Thorne's Students' Bookshop Ltd.
- Webb, Jonathan CK (2009). Tyneside from the Air. Derby: Breedon Books Publishing Co Ltd. ISBN 9781 85983 683 5.
- Woodhouse, Robert (1992). Gateshead. A Pictorial History. Chichester: Phillimore & Co Ltd. ISBN 0 85033 825 5.
