= Timeline of Tyne and Wear =

The following is a timeline of the county of Tyne and Wear, England.

Tyne and Wear was created in 1974 from parts of Northumberland and County Durham. For dates before 1974 see: Timeline of Northumbria and Northumberland and Timeline of County Durham

== 20th century ==
=== 1970s ===
- 1974
  - The county of Tyne and Wear was created
  - Gateshead became a Metropolitan borough which included Blaydon, Felling, Ryton, Whickham, Birtley and Lamesley
- 1976
  - 8 April: Court Shipbuilding Group officially opened a new covered shipbuilding hall, replacing Doxford's East Yard in Sunderland
  - Work began on construction of the Queen Elizabeth II Metro Bridge
  - Eldon Square Shopping Centre in Newcastle upon Tyne was opened
  - In the 1976 Football League Cup final Newcastle United F.C. lost 2-1 to Manchester City F.C.
- 1977
  - Queen Elizabeth II visited Newcastle upon Tyne
- 1978
  - 1 August: The two sections of the Queen Elizabeth II Metro Bridge were joined in the centre
  - The former Bartram & Sons shipyard in Sunderland was closed
- 1979
  - The unemployment rate in Newcastle upon Tyne was 8%
  - After the launch of the Badagry Palm by Sunderland Shipbuilders the shipyard at North Sands was mothballed
- 1979-81
  - 19% of factory jobs were lost in Newcastle upon Tyne

=== 1980s ===
- 1980
  - Jackie Milburn was made a Freeman of the City of Newcastle upon Tyne, along with Basil Hume
- 1981
  - 6 November: Queen Elizabeth II Metro Bridge officially opened by Queen Elizabeth II
  - 15 November: Queen Elizabeth II Metro Bridge and new section of Metro line from Haymarket, Newcastle upon Tyne to Heworth opened to the public
  - Newcastle City Council began a rolling programme for regeneration of the Quayside
- 1982
  - The unemployment rate in Newcastle upon Tyne was 18%
- 1983
  - New Redheugh Bridge between Gateshead and Newcastle was opened by Diana, Princess of Wales
- 1985
  - 3 May: Mitla launched by Laings shipbuilders, the last ship to be built there
- 1986
  - October: Metrocentre, Gateshead, was opened by Nicholas Ridley, Secretary of State for the Environment

=== 1990s ===
- 1990
  - May: Gateshead Garden Festival was opened by Princess Anne
  - 1 December: Blaydon Bridge opened by Queen Elizabeth II
- 1991
  - At the Census the population of Newcastle was 280,000
  - Riots took place in Elswick
- 1992
  - Newcastle Polytechnic became Northumbria University
- 1997
  - C. A. Parsons and Company Heaton, Newcastle upon Tyne works taken over by Siemens
- 1998
  - May: In the 1998 FA Cup final Newcastle United F.C. lost 2-0 to Arsenal F.C.
  - Angel of the North in Gateshead was completed, designed by Antony Gormley
- 1999
  - In the 1999 FA Cup final Newcastle United F.C. lost 2-0 to Manchester United F.C.

== 21st century ==
=== 2000s ===
- 2001
  - Gateshead Millennium Bridge was opened
- 2002
  - July: Baltic Centre for Contemporary Art was opened
- 2002-04
  - Sage Gateshead was built

=== 2020s ===
- 2025
  - 16 March: In the 2025 EFL Cup final, Newcastle United defeated Liverpool 2–1 at Wembley, with goals scored by Dan Burn and Alexander Isak

== See also ==
- History of Tyne and Wear
- Timeline of Newcastle upon Tyne
- Timeline of Gateshead
- Timeline of Sunderland

== Sources ==
- Clark, Andrew (2002). The People's History - Sunderland Shipyards. Seaham: The People's History Ltd. ISBN 1 902527 00 3.
- Colls, Robert; Lancaster, Bill (2001). Newcastle upon Tyne. A Modern History. Chichester: Phillimore & Co Ltd. ISBN 1-86077-167-X.
- Donaghy, Peter; Laidler, John (2012). Discovering NewcastleGateshead. Ammanford: Sigma Leisure. ISBN 978 1 85058 913 6.
- Flowers, Anna; Histon, Vanessa (1999). Water Under the Bridges, Newcastle's Twentieth Century. Newcastle upon Tyne: Tyne Bridge Publishing. ISBN 1-85795-140-9.
- Hepplewhite, Peter (2002). Images of England - Newcastle upon Tyne. Stroud: Tempus Publishing Ltd. ISBN 0 7524 1598 0.
- Manders, Frank; Potts, Richard (2004). Crossing the Tyne. Newcastle upon Tyne: Tyne Bridge Publishing. ISBN 1857951212.
- Sadler, John; Serdiville, Rosie (2019). The Little Book of Newcastle. Stroud, Gloucestershire: The History Press. ISBN 978-0-7509-9003-5.
- Taylor, Simon; Lovie, David B (2004). Gateshead. Architecture in a changing English urban landscape. London: English Heritage. ISBN 1 873592 76 0.
- Webb, Jonathan CK (2009). Tyneside from the Air. Derby: Breedon Books Publishing Co Ltd. ISBN 9781 85983 683 5.
- Woodhouse, Robert (1992). Gateshead. A Pictorial History. Chichester: Phillimore & Co Ltd. ISBN 0 85033 825 5.
