= Austin & Pickersgill =

Shipbuilding co

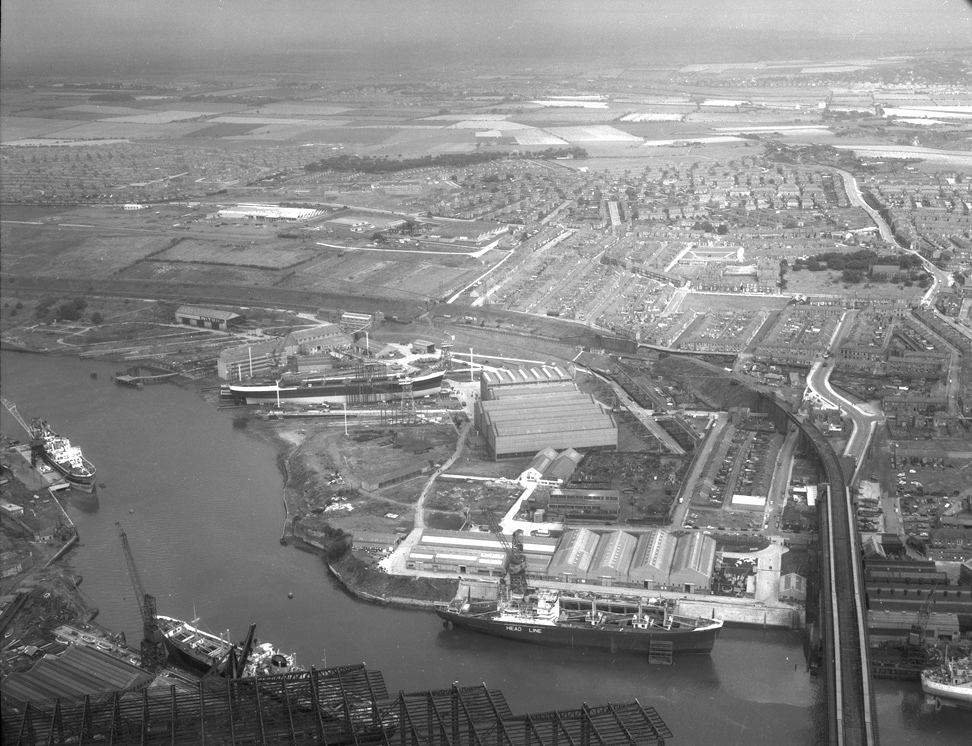
- Southwick Yard, 1961
- Type: Subsidiary
- Industry: Shipbuilding
- Predecessor: SP Austin & Son; William Pickersgill & Sons
- Founded: 1954
- Defunct: 1986
- Successor: North East Shipbuilders
- Headquarters: Sunderland, England
- Products: Ships
- Parent: London & Overseas Freighters

Austin & Pickersgill was a shipbuilding company formed in Sunderland, England in 1954.

== History ==
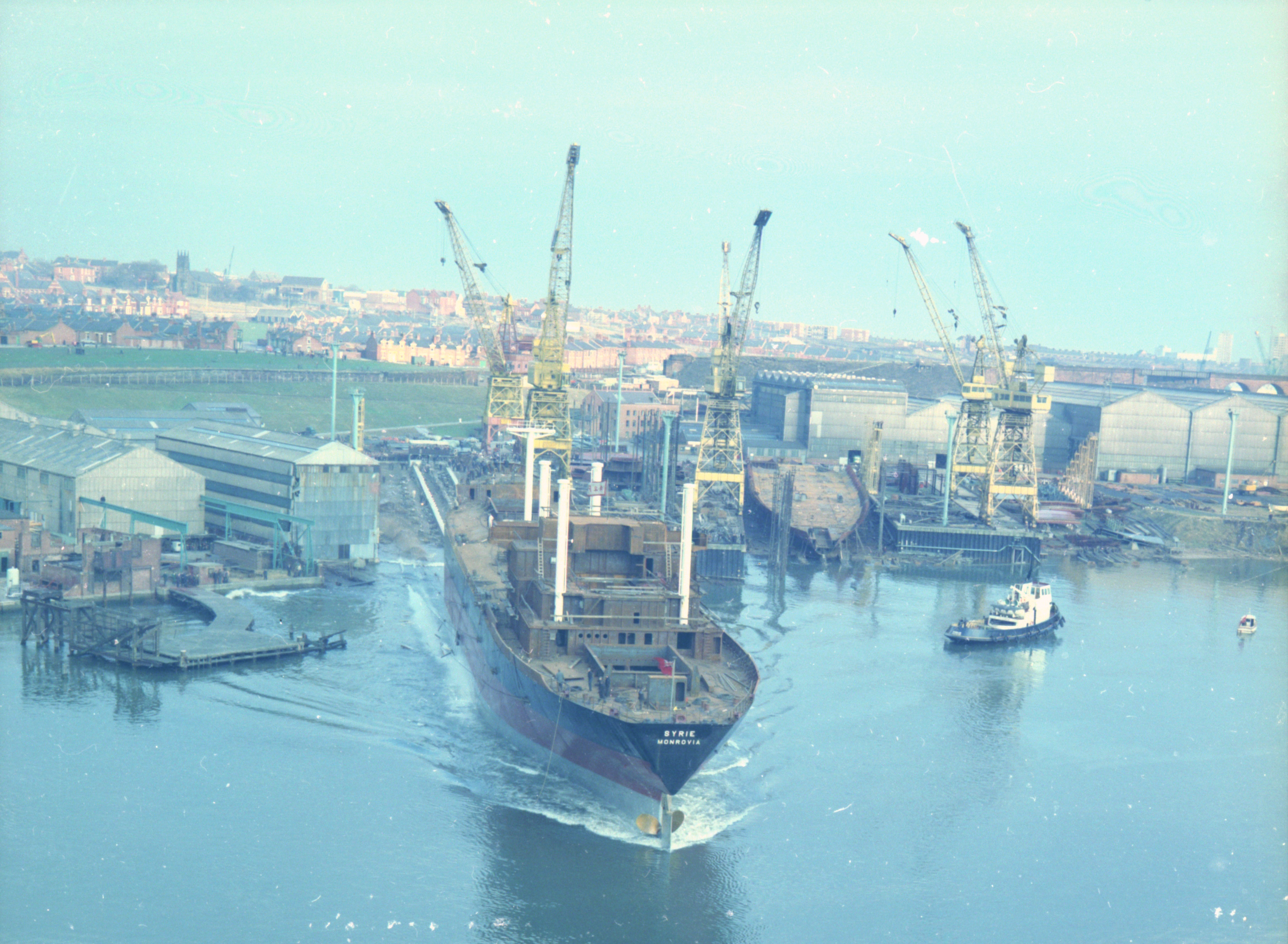
Launch of the SD14 Syrie from the Southwick shipyard of Austin & Pickersgill, 14 February 1968

Austin & Pickersgill was formed in Sunderland in 1954 by the merger of S.P. Austin & Son Limited and William Pickersgill & Sons Limited. After the merger, Austin's Wear Dock yard was used for repair while shipbuilding was concentrated at Pickersgill's Southwick yard. The latter was modernised with the introduction of large assembly shops and prefabrication processes. This reduced costs and increased the maximum size of a vessel that the yard could build from 10,000 to 40,000 tons deadweight.

In 1957 a consortium of three companies led by London & Overseas Freighters took over Austin & Pickersgill. In October 1968 Austin & Pickersgill took over Bartram & Sons, whose South Dock yard was also in Sunderland. In 1970 London & Overseas Freighters bought out the other members of the consortium to take 100% ownership of Austin & Pickersgill.

In 1977 Austin & Pickersgill was nationalised as a member company of British Shipbuilders. In 1986 the company merged with Sunderland Shipbuilders to form North East Shipbuilders Limited. However, both the Southwick and the Doxford Pallion Shipbuilding Yards closed in 1988 following negotiations with the European Commission to reduce shipbuilding capacity in the United Kingdom.

=== Ship Production ===
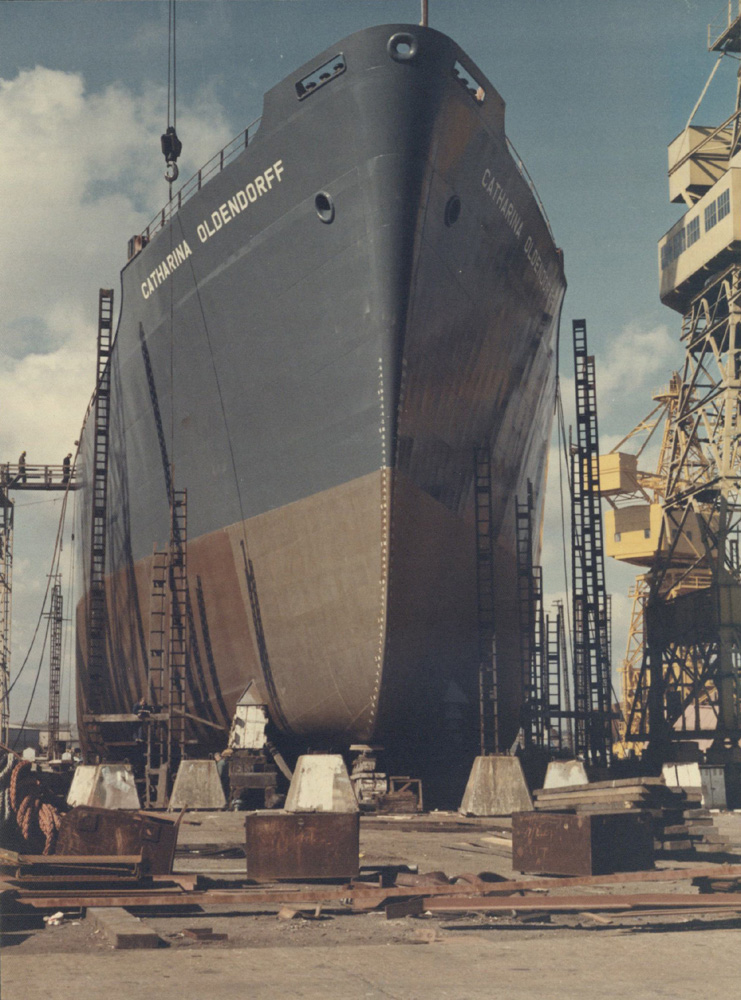
SD14 cargo ship Catharina Oldendorff ready for launch, 20 August 1974

A&P maximised the competitiveness of its prefabrication process by producing ships to standard designs rather than individual specifications. From 1962 onwards the company offered standard bulk carriers in a range of sizes designated according to tonnage. A&P's most numerous product was another of its standard designs, the SD14 shelter deck cargo ship. During World War II, shipyards in the United States had delivered more than 2,700 Liberty ship shelter deck cargo ships. By the 1960s many Liberty ships were reaching the end of their service lives, so in 1965 A&P started to develop a low-cost shelter-deck cargo vessel to replace them.

A&P invited other United Kingdom based shipbuilders to tender for licences to produce SD14s, but by 1966 only Bartram's could meet A&P's requirement to build each ship to a selling price of £915,000. Both Bartram's and A&P built their first SD14s in 1967 and handed them to their new owners in February 1968. A&P's takeover of Bartram's followed in October.

In 1967 A&P licensed Hellenic Shipyards of Skaramangas in Greece to build 20 SD14s. In 1971 A&P licensed Companhia Comércio e Navegação to build SD14s at Mauá in Brazil.

In 1973 Robb Caledon Shipbuilding of Dundee in Scotland contracted to build three SD14s. Astilleros y Fábricas Navales del Estado also obtained permission to build six SD14s in its yard at Ensenada in Argentina.

By the time production ceased, 211 SD14s had been built either at A&P's Southwick and South Dock yards and or by licensees in Greece, Brazil, Scotland and Argentina. The largest volume of sales was to Greek shipowners. The SD14 and B-series standard ship designs, and the prefabrication methods by which they were built enabled A&P to maintain a full order book until nationalisation in 1977, in contrast to many other UK shipbuilders in that era.
