= Great fire of Newcastle and Gateshead =

1854 series of fires and an explosion in Tyne and Wear, England

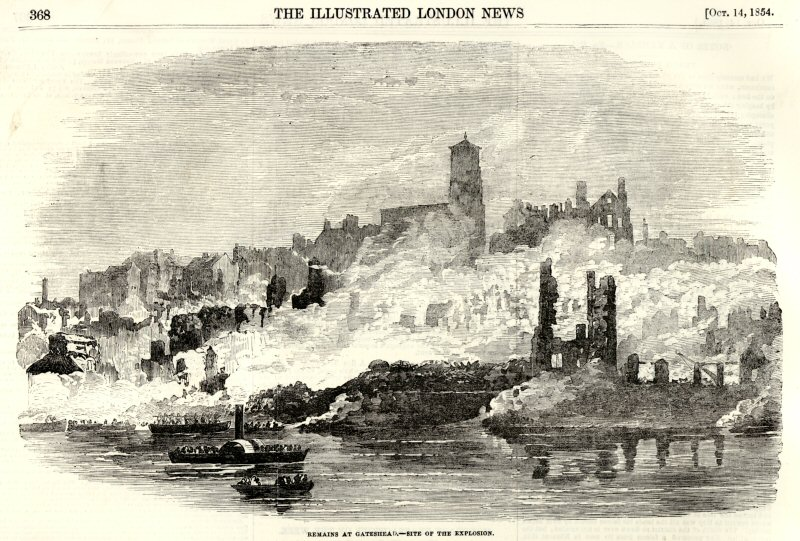
- Ruins of the Bertram's warehouse; St. Mary's Church in the background

- Great fire of Newcastle and Gateshead (Tyne and Wear)
- Date: October 6–7, 1854
- Location: Tyne and Wear, England, United Kingdom; 54.968°N 1.606°W
- Type: Structure fire with subsequent explosions
- Cause: Accidental ignition
- Deaths: 53
- Injuries: 400–500
- Property damage: Hundreds of homes and businesses destroyed, wharfs and ships damaged or sunk; total losses estimated to be in excess of £500,000
- Inquiries: Fire was determined to be mysterious but likely accidental; explosions were determined to be a result of mixing of chemicals in the original warehouse

The great fire of Gateshead and Newcastle was a series of events starting on Friday 6 October 1854, in which a substantial amount of property in two North East England towns was destroyed in a series of fires and an explosion which killed 53 and injured hundreds. There is only one building still extant on the Newcastle Quayside which predated the fire.

== Gateshead and Newcastle in 1854 ==
The towns of Newcastle upon Tyne and Gateshead sit opposite each other, on relatively steep slopes leading down to the River Tyne. On the north side is Newcastle, the quayside of which was one of the largest in the kingdom, with much shipping and the concentration of the town's business and commerce. Gateshead had similarly dense development opposite the quayside with manufactories, mills and warehouses built down to the water's edge, behind which and running up the hill were numberless densely occupied tenemented dwellings.

The towns were linked by two bridges, built no more than 100 feet (30 m) apart. The older was a nine-arched stone bridge, built in 1771, the third to have been constructed on the site. Slightly upstream was Robert Stephenson's new High Level Bridge, completed five years previously in 1849, an ingenious double-decker design allowing railway traffic on the upper deck and road traffic on the lower.

== The worsted manufactory ==
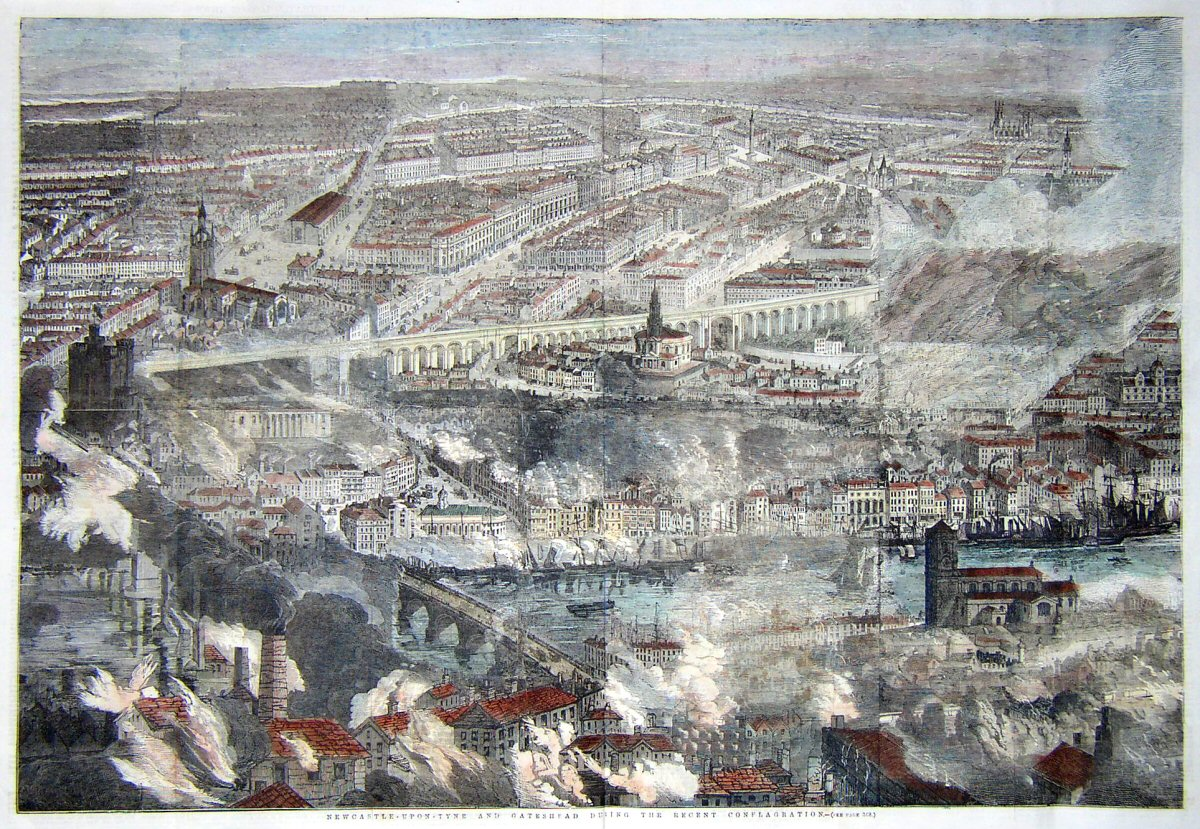
A portrayal of Newcastle and Gateshead during the conflagration; Newcastle is across the river, Gateshead in the foreground. Handcoloured woodblock engraving from the Illustrated London News, 14 October 1854

On the Gateshead riverbank, a few yards downstream of the old bridge, stood the splendid new mill premises of Messrs. J. Wilson & Sons, worsted manufacturers. This large gaslight-lit building had been erected after a fire which destroyed their previous premises, on the same site, three years before the events of this great fire.

At half past midnight on Friday 6 October 1854, the mill was discovered to be on fire; the cry was raised and immediately the streets crowded with people hurrying to the scene of the growing conflagration. The fire being confined to the upper stories of the building, efforts were made to salvage stock on lower floors; but the great quantities of oil in the premises, used to treat wool, added fuel to the fire and quickly curtailed the attempts. Despite the prompt attendance of the North British and Newcastle fire engines, within an hour the building was one mass of flame and within two the roof fell in and the building was a total wreck.

== Bertram's warehouse ==
In the immediate neighbourhood of Wilson & Sons was a bond warehouse built twelve years previously by Charles Bertram, and generally known by his name. The building was extensive, reaching to seven storeys, and capable of holding an immense amount of goods. It was at the time used to store thousands of tons of sulphur, nitrate of soda, and other combustibles. It was in part "a double fire-proof structure", with massive metal pillars and every due precaution against fire for the time.

Despite this, from its proximity to the worsted factory, the intense heat caused the sulphur to ignite, melt and stream in a burning blue flame liquidised state from the windows. The authorities, abandoning the mill, sought to save the warehouse, directing all their efforts on it, and were reinforced by the military with their fire engine. This effort was thwarted by the wide scattering of burning brands from the fallen factory roof, which gave additional stimulation to the burning sulphur. By 3 am, the entire warehouse was one body of flames "most awfully magnificent". The sulphurous blaze illuminated the river and its shipping, the High Level Bridge, the Castle, the steeples of All Saints', St. Nicholas' and St. Mary's churches, and every prominent object, with a lurid purple light. From the various floors of the warehouse the sulphur flowed in torrents like streams of lava, and the building resembled "a cataract on fire". Yet at this point the occurrence had borne no aspect other than that of a fearful blaze, a tremendous firestorm sufficiently serious of itself, and altogether unprecedented in the annals of the district.

== The explosion ==
Such a large fire naturally attracted many spectators, who occupied every spot on the bridges, boats, quayside and surrounding buildings. The fire spread to a wooden staith or jetty used in former times for loading coal, which for a time shared with the warehouse the attention of the thronging multitude.

A slight concussion warned the crowd that there was something more perilous than sulphur alone in the burning pile. A second slight explosion did not warn the firemen and surrounding crowds. A third passed unheeded even.

After a few minutes, the final explosion occurred. The vaults of the warehouse were burst open with a tremendous and terrific explosion, heard 20 miles (32 km) away. Vessels on the river lifted as if lashed by a sudden storm. The old bridge shook, and the new quivered. Massive walls were crumbled into heaps, houses tumbled into ruins. The venerable St Mary’s parish church, on the hill in Gateshead, was shattered to a wreck. Gravestones were broken and uplifted. The hands on the dial of its clock stood at ten minutes past three.

Thick black smoke rose as a "pillar of cloud"; temporarily all was silent; and then the scene was lit by falling burning debris from the warehouse, the noise of falling dwellings and then the cries of the injured.

== Force of the explosion ==
The force of the explosion was immense, and heavy debris was thrown as much as 3/4 mile (1.2 km) from the seat of the explosion. Huge granite blocks forming the tramway for carts outside the warehouse were flung over the church for two and three hundred yards into neighbouring streets and buildings. One is recorded as falling 400 yards (370 m) away through the roof of the Grey Horse pub. A stone of 20 stone (280 lb; 127 kg) weight damaged property in Oakwellgate. Large blocks of wood and stone were projected widely over Newcastle, reaching the west end of the quayside. The Courant newspaper office in Pilgrim Street was hit. A stone weighing 18.5 pounds (8.4 kg) fell through the roof of an opticians in Grey Street; when workmen discovered it in the morning it was still too hot to touch. A huge beam of timber, six feet long, was found on the roof of All Saints' Church, Newcastle upon Tyne. Another, ten feet in length and weighing 3 cwt (150 kg) landed on the Ridley Arms in Pilgrim Street; and others on the roof of a house in Moseley Street.

The reverberation of the explosion was heard at North Shields, 10 miles (16 km) distant, where residents thought the shock was an earthquake. Gas lights in a Jarrow paper mill were blown out. Light debris from the fire was scattered across 6 miles (10 km) of Gateshead and environs. Miners in Monkwearmouth colliery, the deepest in the country and 11 miles (18 km) away, heard the explosion and came to the surface, concerned as to the cause. 20 miles (30 km) westward at Hexham; 35 miles (56 km) north at Alnwick; and 40 miles (64 km) south at Hartlepool the explosion was heard distinctly; and for 20 nautical miles (37 km; 23 mi) out to sea. The light of the flames could be seen, reflected in the sky, 50 miles (80 km) away at Northallerton. And whilst the report of the explosion travelled so far, people on the scene were insensible of it. They describe themselves as having been lifted from their feet and dashed down, the violence completely stunning them; and when they awoke in a stupor they had only the dim idea of a rolling sound in their ears.

The explosion crater was measured to have a depth of 40 feet (12 m), and a diameter of 50 feet (15 m).

== The Newcastle fires ==
The projectile power of the explosion scattered burning debris widely across Newcastle; and the blast peeled off roofs as if to receive this flaming rain. One hundred yards of street frontage—offices, shops and warehouses—were in a short time in flames, the conflagration running up the hill, Butcher Bank, to Pilgrim Street. A second conflagration, in a triangle bounded by Pilgrim Street, Butchers Bank and George's Stairs took hold. The entire combined strengths of the local fire brigades had been directed on the Gateshead properties and were, besides, buried beneath the rubble. So quickly did the fire move through the packed buildings that it was impossible to put out.

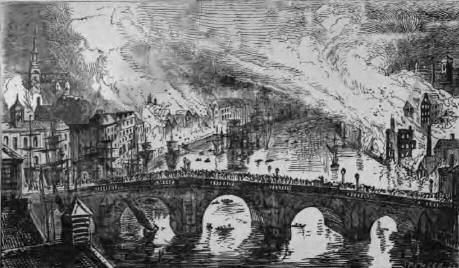
Illustration of the great fire, as seen from the High Level Bridge, opened in 1849. Illustration from A record of the Great Fire in Newcastle and Gateshead, 1855, George Routledge & Co

== View from the High Level Bridge ==
The High Level Bridge provided an excellent elevated platform for observation of the twin fires, as they extended in Gateshead and Newcastle; the lower portions of the towns "took on the aspect of a burning cauldron". A mass of onlookers thronged the lower bridge watching the flames which rose from left and right, towering up and leaping from house to house, lane to lane, street to street.

== Emergency response ==
The fires, from hour to hour progressed rampantly, irresistibly bearing down everything which came within range of their power, checked only providentially. The authorities moved, throughout, with all speed at their disposal, directed by the two Mayors, with assistance from men of the councils; members of the Board of Guardians; two fire brigades, and officers and men of the local garrison.

As soon as the area's telegraph wires, damaged by the explosion, could be made good, calls for assistance went out to the surrounding towns and cities. Fire engines were sent by the most expeditious means from Durham, Hexham, Carlisle, Morpeth and Berwick. Floating fire engines from Shields and Sunderland were dispatched, as were another three engines from the latter town. Owing to the serious injury to the military of Gateshead, detachments were sent from Tynemouth, Sunderland and Carlisle, which arrived by the earliest trains. This combined effort through the early course of the day appeared to be checking the progress of the flames.

== Renewal of the Gateshead Fire ==
After noon, a renewal of the conflagration on the Gateshead side arose as a stream of blazing sulphur made its way east along the riverbank, setting light to Mr. Davidson's flour mill, which had hitherto merely been ruined by the explosion. It was quickly alight, and for several hours afterwards the fire travelled east from building to building. This mass of buildings was still alight at midnight, at which point the flames were licking at St. Mary's church; but this was saved by heroic effort. In the emergency, it was resolved to demolish by explosion some of the already shattered houses to the east of the fire to form a firebreak, a task quickly accomplished by parties of sappers and miners. By this means, and by the action of the powerful floating engines, the fire was confined and at length consumed and extinguished.

== Effects: the ruins ==
The High Level Bridge once more provided a first-class platform for the observation of the effects of the explosion and fire. Looking east from it the eye could span the whole sphere of devastation, taking in the still-smoking wreckage of property levelled to the ground.

Besides the less serious damage to property in the outskirts of the town, the force of the explosion left its marks in blown off roofs, thrown down walls and gable ends, broken staircases, shattered doors, demolished windows, framework and sashes, making complete havoc of properties it did not entirely destroy. So widespread was the damage that scarcely a house in the lower and middle part of Newcastle escaped unscathed. On Sandhill, nine out of every ten shop fronts was blown in. In The Side, Dean Street, Mosely Street, Collingwood Street, Grey Street, Market Street, Pilgrim Street and even in Clayton Street west, the same effects were to a considerable extent observable. In Gateshead the same effects were produced in Pipewellgate, Bridge Street, Church Street, Bottle Bank, Canon Street, Oakwellgate and streets beyond.

The area was thronged as if on a fair day, throughout Friday and for the rest of the weekend. It is estimated that 20,000 people arrived by train on Saturday; special trains were laid on, running every hour.

== Loss of life and injury ==
The scale of injury and loss of life was smaller than might be imagined from such an infernal night. Some 53 people were accounted as having died, including Alexander Dobson, the 26-year-old second son of the renowned Newcastle architect John Dobson; Charles Bertram, owner of the exploding warehouse; and William Davidson, scion of the mill-owning family. Figures for the injured are less reliable, but it is supposed that from 400-500 people were injured, some horribly, and many receiving treatment at the Gateshead Dispensary and the Newcastle Infirmary. At the latter hospital, the beds of the existing in-patients were given to the newly injured, and the existing in-patients—where able—tended the new charges in their beds, under the direction of the medical staff.

Two hundred families "of the poorer classes" were burned out of their houses; amongst which were several orphans and widows. Each was calculated to have lost, on average, £15 of property.

== Benevolent efforts ==
A single benevolent fund was established, though the greater number of sufferers was on the Gateshead side. Gateshead Council commenced the collection with a donation of £600, and opened a subscription list for donors. Newcastle Council held a public meeting in the Guildhall and opened a list, headed by the Mayor, who donated £100; subscriptions from those at the meeting passed the £1000 mark. Queen Victoria contributed £100, and later, on a visit to Balmoral had the royal train stop on the High Level Bridge so she could observe the damage. The inhabitants of Alnwick succeeded in raising £300, including a donation of £100 from the Duke of Northumberland; several other towns contributed in a similar liberal way. The Bishop of Durham subscribed £150, the Earl of Carlisle £200, and so on, down to collections from workmen and the militia.

Upwards of £11,000 were subscribed and no less than eight hundred families applied for assistance from the funds. Altogether £4,640 was paid for the loss of furniture. In February, 1857, the benevolent fund committee stated that they had expended £6,533, and reserved £3,044 for widows and orphans, with the remainder of the fund distributed to the Newcastle Infirmary, £1,190; Gateshead Dispensary, £314; Ragged Schools, £195; other charities, £50.

== Property destroyed ==
In Gateshead, beside the less serious damage to windows and property generally, all that part of the town from the Church and Church Walk to the river, lying east of Bridge Street and comprising Hillgate was more or less destroyed. The whole of Canon Street, situated on the south side of St. Mary's Church was a mess of ruins. The houses on Church Walk were so shattered and demolished as to be no longer safe for human habitation. As to properties on the waterfront, the following were destroyed:

- Singer's vinegar factory
- A clump of tenements
- The bond warehouse
- Carr's timber yard
- Wilson's worsted manufactory
- Bulcrauig's engine manufactory

Banks of tenement housing on the hill behind the mill and warehouse were variously levelled, greatly damaged and consigned to the flames.

On the Newcastle side:

- The Custom House roof and every window was removed, every door ripped from its hinges
- Broad Garth entry – property damaged fronting the Quay
- Fenwick's entry – much injured by fire and partially destroyed
- Plumbers chare – nearly all of the warehouses burnt down
- Hornsby's chare – property completely destroyed
- Colman's chare – Totally burnt down
- Pallister's chare – Ditto
- Peppercorn chare – Ditto
- Grinding chare – considerably burnt down, property at front destroyed
- Dark entry – front property much injured
- The Exchange & Town Clerk's Office – shattered roof and windows, thrown completely into disarray.

The estimated loss, calculated some months after the event, and taking account of foregone rents, was not less than £500,000. Much of the property was insured – well in excess of £130,000 of claims were documented to have been made within the year, with more private insurance claims going unrecorded in the official history. Equally, many firms and individuals were uninsured or underinsured.

== Judicial enquiry ==
Two inquests were held into the events, one on the Gateshead side and the other on the Newcastle side. The main points of consideration for both were the causes of the fire, and the cause of the explosion. Lord Palmerston, the Prime Minister appointed one Captain Ducane of the Royal Engineers to attend on the government's behalf, and dispatched Alfred Swaine Taylor FRS to investigate the chemical causes of the explosion.

The inquest juries found that no direct evidence as to the origin of the fire was presented. Mill hands responsible for various of the upper floors gave testimony that at the end of the day, all gas lights had been extinguished, and the gas supply isolated at a main tap; no cause was suggested and no progress made in this line of enquiry. The Gateshead jury found that there must have been "some want of caution displayed" at the mill to occasion the fire.

Evidence in respect of the explosion was of more interest. A statement of the contents of the warehouse was given, the most interesting features of which were 2800 tons of sulphur and 128 tons of nitrate of soda. These goods lay on various floors, and in the vaults, arranged so that in the event of a destructive fire, they might mix. Evidence given suggests that there were no other obvious candidates as fuel for the explosion; no oils, no naphtha nor oils of vitriol. Great lengths were taken, including the posting of a reward for information, to ascertain whether gunpowder was stored in the warehouse; but all evidence pointed against it. A number of chemists, including the government chemist, tested residues found on the scene, as well as black dust which fell on the spectators, looking for the remains of combusted gunpowder; but none was found.

A mixture of sulphur and nitrate of soda is not considered to be explosive, although the addition of carbon to the two forms black powder.

Two scientific theories were advanced to explain the cause of the explosion. Hugh Lee Patterson, a partner in a chemical company at Felling and Washington examined the evidence and ran tests; and offered a theory that a sudden water inundation onto burning sulphur would have had sufficient energy to cause the explosion. His theory, meticulous in its calculations, estimated that 52.5 cubic feet (1.49 m^{3}) of water would have been necessary, having a power equivalent to 8 tons of gunpowder. However no satisfactory mechanism was advanced for the sudden ingress of such an amount of water, amounting to a couple of tons. Neither were victims of the explosion scalded, as might have been anticipated.

Professor Taylor offered a gas theory of the explosion, in which he contended that deflagration would cause a pressure of gas to build up sufficiently quickly in the vaults – the entrance to which was small and through the roof – to cause the explosion. The difficulty with this explanation was in believing that the vaults were well enough sealed as to result in an explosion, when a more gradual forcing up of the cellar roof might more reasonably be anticipated.

The Gateshead jury found that the explosion was caused by the interaction of sulphur and nitrate of soda, but were unable to determine a mechanism. They did make the recommendation that the two should not be stored together in future. They found a complete want of evidence for gunpowder.

== Sources ==
- A record of the Great Fire in Newcastle and Gateshead. George Routledge & Co. 1855.
