= South Hylton =

Suburb of Sunderland, England

Coordinates: 54.904113°N 1.447837°W

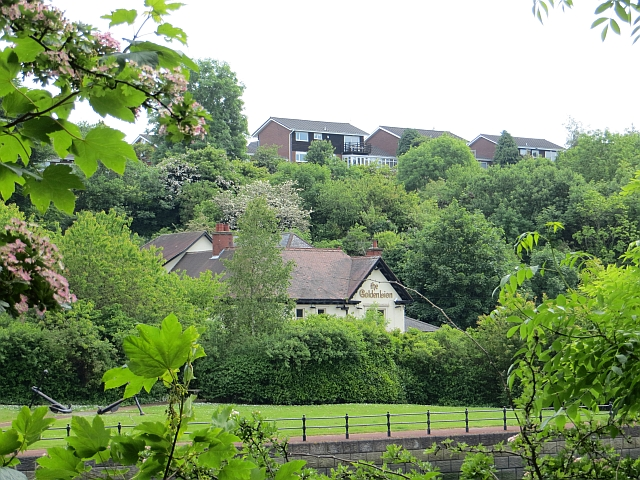
- Golden Lion, South Hylton

- Location within Tyne and Wear
- Metropolitan borough: City of Sunderland
- Metropolitan county: Tyne and Wear
- Region: North East
- Country: England
- Sovereign state: United Kingdom
- Post town: SUNDERLAND
- Postcode district: SR4
- Dialling code: 0191
- Police: Northumbria
- Fire: Tyne and Wear
- Ambulance: North East
- UK Parliament: Washington and Sunderland West

South Hylton (/ˈhɪltən/) is a suburb of Sunderland, Tyne and Wear, England. Lying west of Sunderland city centre on the south bank of the River Wear, South Hylton has a population of 10,317 (2001 Census). Once a small industrial village, South Hylton (with only one access road) is now a dormitory village and is a single track terminus for the Tyne and Wear Metro.

South Hylton was originally known as Hylton Ferry or Low Ford, its current name not coming into regular use until the late 18th to early 19th century. It originally formed part of the Manor of Ford owned by the Barons Hylton, until the estates of Hylton Castle were sold off in 1750 after the death of the last baron. Originally a collection of farmsteads, it became a diversified industrial village as a result of the Industrial Revolution.

== History ==
See also History of Sunderland

Archaeological excavations around North Hylton and South Hylton indicate the area has been occupied since at least the Mesolithic era. The remains of either a Bronze Age or Iron Age log boat and bronze swords were recovered from the nearby River Wear in the 19th and early 20th centuries.

Masonry from a possible Roman bridge or dam across the Wear have been found, the local historian Robert Surtees recorded the discovery in the Wear of a Roman milestone, and Roman coins were found in the village in 1962 and 1994. An Anglo-Saxon brooch has also been discovered near Wood House Farm in North Hylton.

The village was bombed during the Second World War during Luftwaffe raids on Sunderland.

== Geography ==
=== Topography ===
South Hylton Pasture is a Site of Special Scientific Interest and one of the few remaining examples of lowland hay meadow in Britain, and the only example in Sunderland. The shallow, north-facing slopes of the pasture support unimproved neutral grassland, with associated wet flushes. Traditional management for hay production followed by winter grazing has maintained a herb-rich sward and supports the common blue and meadow brown butterflies.

== Listed buildings ==
There are six Grade II listed buildings in the area. They are:

=== St Mary's Church ===
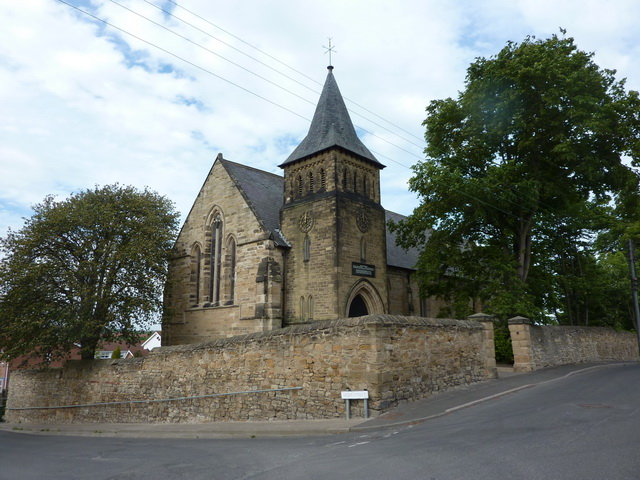
St Mary's Church

The first Anglican chapel in South Hylton was donated by Captain (later Admiral) Thomas James Maling (whose first wife, Harriot Darwin, was the half-aunt of Charles Darwin) in 1817 as a chapel of ease, due to the distance between the village and the mother church of St Michael's in Bishopwearmouth. It was consecrated on 15 February 1821 by Thomas Burgess, the Bishop of St Davids, and the chapelry district was formed in 1844 as a perpetual curacy. Originally a house chapel known as Hylton Lodge, it burnt down in 1878 and was rebuilt in 1880 by Charles Hodgson Fowler. The tower was added in 1930 by George Edward Charlewood and the porch in 1970 by Ronald Sims.

=== 41 and 42 High Street ===
41 High Street dates from the late 18th century. Adjacent to 41 is 42 High Street, known as Hylton House. It is the oldest house in the village and also dates from the late 18th century. Both houses and the retaining walls outside constitute separate listed buildings.

=== The Golden Lion ===
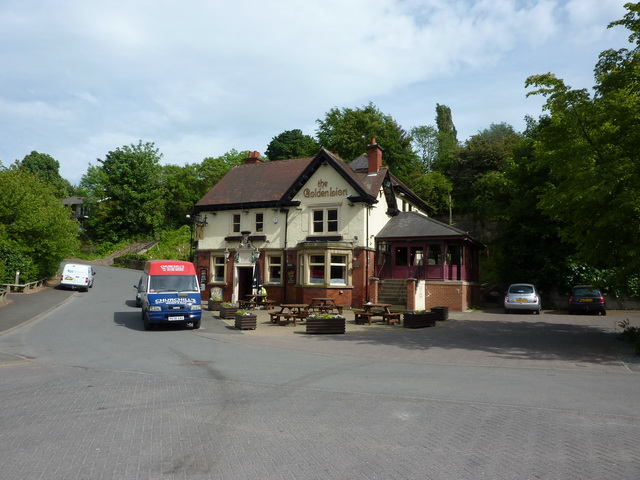
The Golden Lion

One of the four public houses (including a working men's club) in the area is The Golden Lion, situated near the river bank. The pub has existed since at least the mid-19th century, but the current building dates to around 1910. One of its main external features is the front door stone surround commemorating the marriage of John Hylton and his wife, Dorothy Musgrave, which was recovered from the north wing of Hylton Castle. The Golden Lion was extensively damaged in a blaze in 2019.

=== War memorial ===
On 16 August 1924 the village war memorial was unveiled by Major John Rodham Wigham of Ford Villa, who donated the site. The memorial is of granite with wrought-iron railings and commemorates the villagers who died in the First World War on the west face, and those of the Second World War on the north face.

== Transport ==
Road access to South Hylton is via one road, Hylton Bank. The road starts at nearby Pennywell, becoming High Street at the heart of the village, and ends at the riverbank.

A railway line once ran from Sunderland to Durham from the 1850s until 1964, when the track from nearby Penshaw to Sunderland was removed following the Beeching Axe. The line was restored to the village in 2002 when South Hylton Metro station was constructed as a terminus for the Tyne and Wear Metro.

South Hylton formerly had a resident bus company, W. H. Jolly, which ran frequent services from the village into Sunderland town centre. The dominance of Stagecoach which also ran a similar route, coupled with the announcement of the upcoming Tyne & Wear Metro extension to South Hylton, caused the company to close in 1995. In August 2008, Stagecoach stopped its direct route to the village after 7pm and all day Sunday. The route was restored in part, via another company, by the Tyne and Wear Passenger Transport Executive (Nexus) in December 2008.

== Education ==
South Hylton has its own school, South Hylton Primary Academy and St Anne's Roman Catholic Voluntary Aided Primary School is situated at the top of the village. The nearest secondary school is Academy 360 (formerly Pennywell Comprehensive School) in nearby Pennywell.

== Shipbuilding ==
In 1837, George Bartram and John Lister started a shipbuilding yard at South Hylton. In 1871, Bartrams moved their shipyard from South Hylton to South Dock

== See also ==
- South Hylton Metro station

== Sources ==
- Clark, Andrew (2002). The People's History - Sunderland Shipyards. Seaham: The People's History Ltd. ISBN 1-902527-00-3.
- Dodds, Glen Lyndon (2011). A History of Sunderland (Third ed.). Sunderland: Albion Press. ISBN 978-0-9525122-2-6.

=== Bibliography ===
- Mackenzie, Eneas, and Ross, Marvin, An Historical, Topographical, and Descriptive View of the County Palatine of Durham, 1834, p.337
- Whellan, William, History, Topography, and Directory of the County Palatine of Durham, 1856, p.635
