= J. L. Thompson and Sons =

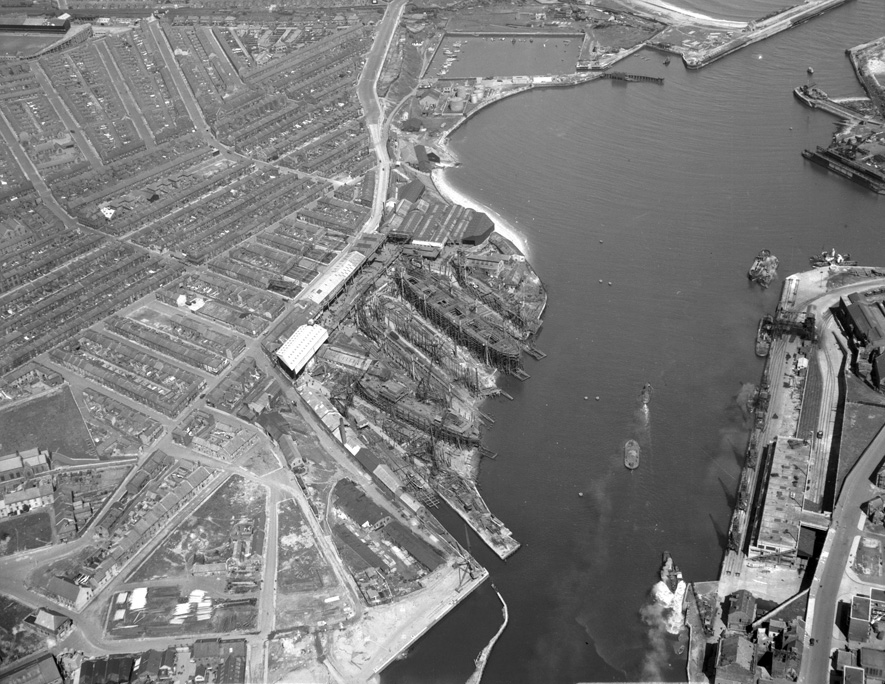
- North Sands shipyard of J. L. Thompson & Sons, May 1950.
- Type: Private
- Industry: Shipbuilding
- Founded: 1846
- Defunct: 1966
- Fate: Merged with William Doxford & Sons
- Successor: Doxford and Sunderland Shipbuilding and Engineering
- Headquarters: River Wear, Sunderland

J. L. Thompson and Sons was a shipbuilder on the River Wear, Sunderland, Tyne and Wear. Its North Sands yard operated from the mid-18th century until the 1980s. During the Second World War, cargo ships derived from Thompson designs, including the Liberty ship, were built in the United States and Canada.

== History ==
=== 19th century ===
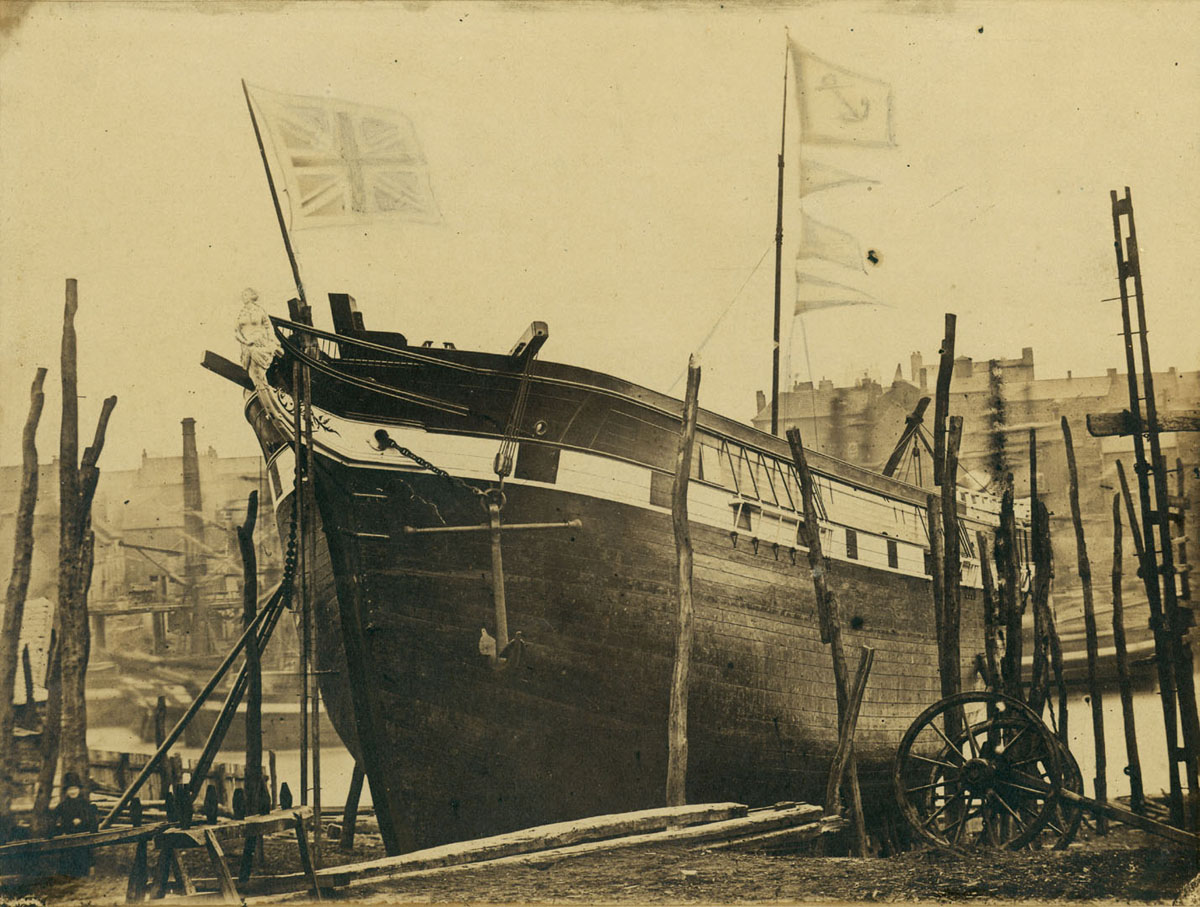
Launch of the barque Vencedora, North Sands, April 1860.

Robert Thompson was born in 1797 to a master mariner. He crewed keelboats before becoming an apprentice in a shipyard at the North Sands along the River Wear. The first ships built under his direction were at a small berth under the Lambton Railway coal staiths in Sunderland. Around 1837, Robert, his sons - Robert junior, Joseph Lowes and John - and brothers opened a shipyard at Washington Staithes as Robert Thompson and Sons. The yard closed after launching its last ship in May 1840. Robert and his sons - by now all shipwrights - relaunched the company in 1846 with a shipyard on leased land at the North Sands. The first ship was the 240 ton brig Pearl; the Thompsons and four other employees built it in 11 weeks for a £200 profit. By 1850, the yard had over 60 workers when it launched its first big ship, the 668 ton Grahams. In 1854, Robert junior left the company to start shipyard at Southwick, Sunderland. Robert died in 1860. John's left in late-1861 to start a shipyard at Sunderland's North Docks. By the end of 1861, Joseph Lowes controlled the company. Around 1862, the company's lease terms changed and it moved to Sand Point with a 100% increase in rent.

In 1870, the company was renamed to Joseph L Thompson. and the yard built its last wooden ships. By this time, Joseph Lowes had sent his sons to learn about iron shipbuilding from Robert junior's Southwick yard. In 1871, the company began constructing its first iron ship. Joseph Lowes retired in 1875 and the company came under the control of his sons Robert, Joseph Lowes and Charles. The company expanded by taking over the entire North Sands, replacing seven other ship yards. In 1883, the yard built the most tonnage on the wear at 30,495 tons over 16 ships. A new quay at the North Docks was completed in 1884 for ship fitting and ship. In 1894, the yard had the world's third fourth largest output at 35,597 tons. In the same year, the company, now called Joseph L Thompson & Sons, became a limited liability company. In 1907, the company built 48,178 tons, the most it would do until the Second World War.

During the First World War, Thompson built 17 cargo ships totalling 91,486 gross tons and small craft for the Royal Navy.

=== Great Depression ===
The Great Depression affected the wider British shipbuilding industry. The company launched no ships from 1931 to 1934. The British Shipping (Assistance) Act 1935 provided subsidies under the "Scrap & Build" program.

The company performed research and development into reducing the building and operating costs of 10,000 ton cargo ships. Robert Cyril Thompson ("Cyril"). head of Thompson's drawing office, tested hull and rudder configurations in ship model basins at the National Physical Laboratory. The company adopted a vertical triple expansion marine steam engine from Sunderland-based North-Eastern Marine Engineering; the engine used a reheater to raise operating temperatures and improve fuel efficiency. The first ship built to with the improvements was the 9,100 deadweight ton (DWT) Embassage, launched and completed in 1935. Embassage became the prototype for a series of Thompson ship designs leading to the Liberty ship of the Second World War.

=== Second World War ===
During the Second World War, Thompson built 40 cargo ships totalling 277,697 gross tons. The yard was damaged by Luftwaffe strategic bombing in May 1943. An expansion yard at Southwick began launching ships in August 1943.

Cargo ships of the Embassage lineage were built in Allied countries in an example of Allied technological cooperation. In late-1940, Cyril travelled to the United States as head of the British Merchant Shipbuilding Mission to secure a supply of North American-built cargo ships for Britain; he was selected by the British Admiralty based on the qualities of Embassage descendants, likely the pre-war Dorington Court or the later Empire Wind. Cyril carried plans for some recent Thompson ships, likely including those for Empire Liberty The Empire Liberty design was modified into the American-built Ocean ship. A design carried by Cyril or the Ocean was then modified into the Canadian-built North Sands type. In 1941, American naval architecture company Gibbs & Cox modified the Ocean design into the Liberty ship.

=== Late-20th century and after ===
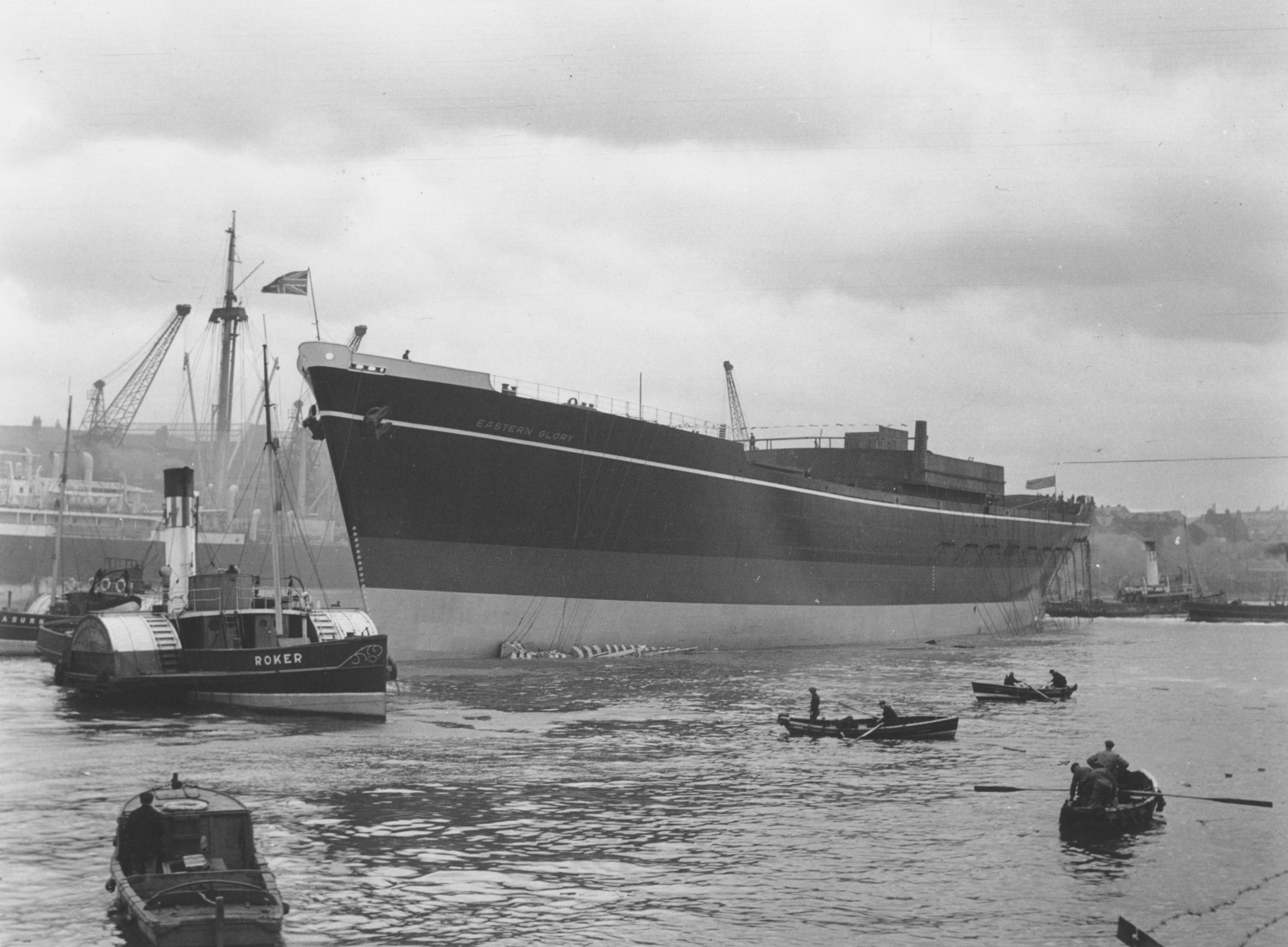
The cargo ship Eastern Glory on 12 April 1949 after launch from the North Sands shipyard

Thompson bought neighbouring John Crown & Sons in 1946 as a subsidiary. The purchase allowed the rearranging of facilities to build larger ships. Thompson ceased to exist in 1966 after being bought by William Doxford & Sons.

In the 1960s, Thompson's spent millions of pounds expanding their capacity to build ships of up to 150,000 tons. Bigger and bigger ships were built by workers throughout the next two decades, but the yard was eventually mothballed until 1986, when the ITM Challenger was built. Today, the site is home to the University of Sunderland and the National Glass Centre.

== Sources ==
- Crockett, Margaret; Foster, Janet (October 2005). Report on the Access to Shipbuilding Collections in North East England (ARK) Project (PDF) (Report). Tyne and Wear Archives. Archived from the original (PDF) on 3 November 2013.
- Henshaw, John (2019). Liberty's Provenance: The Evolution of the Liberty Ship from its Sunderland Origins. Barnsley, United Kingdom: Seaforth Publishing. ISBN 978-1-5267-5064-8.
- Pritchard, James (2011). A Bridge of Ships: Canadian Shipbuilding During the Second World War. Montreal & Kingston: McGill-Queen's University Press. ISBN 978-0-7735-3824-5.
- Smith, J.W.; Holden, T.S. (1953). Where Ships are Born: Sunderland 1346-1946: A History of Shipbuilding on the River Wear (Revised ed.). Sunderland: Thomas Reed and Company.
