= Bartram & Sons =

Former shipbuilding company in Sunderland, England

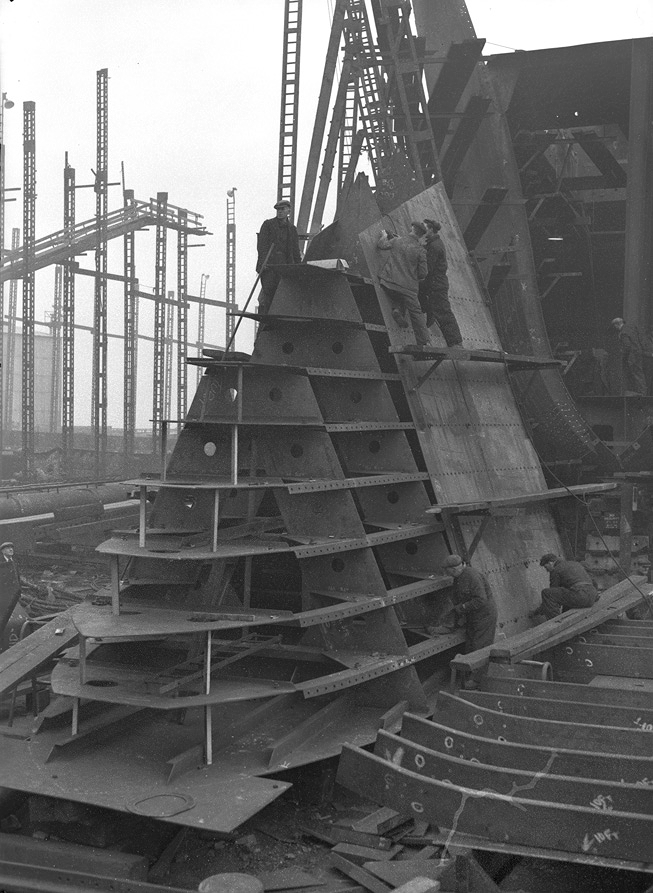
Fabricating the bow of a ship in South Dock yard in 1956

Bartram & Sons was a shipbuilder on Wearside, North East England, that specialised in building cargo ships. It was founded in 1837, taken over in 1968, nationalised in 1977 and closed in 1978.

== Early decades ==
George Bartram and John Lister founded the business in Hylton in 1837–38. In 1852–54 their partnership was dissolved and Bartram's son Robert Appleby Bartram was taken into the business.

On his father's retirement in 1871, Robert went into partnership with George Haswell as Bartram, Haswell and Company and they moved the business to South Dock in Sunderland. They began to build iron-hulled ships and in 1876 they built their last sailing ship, a four-masted barque.

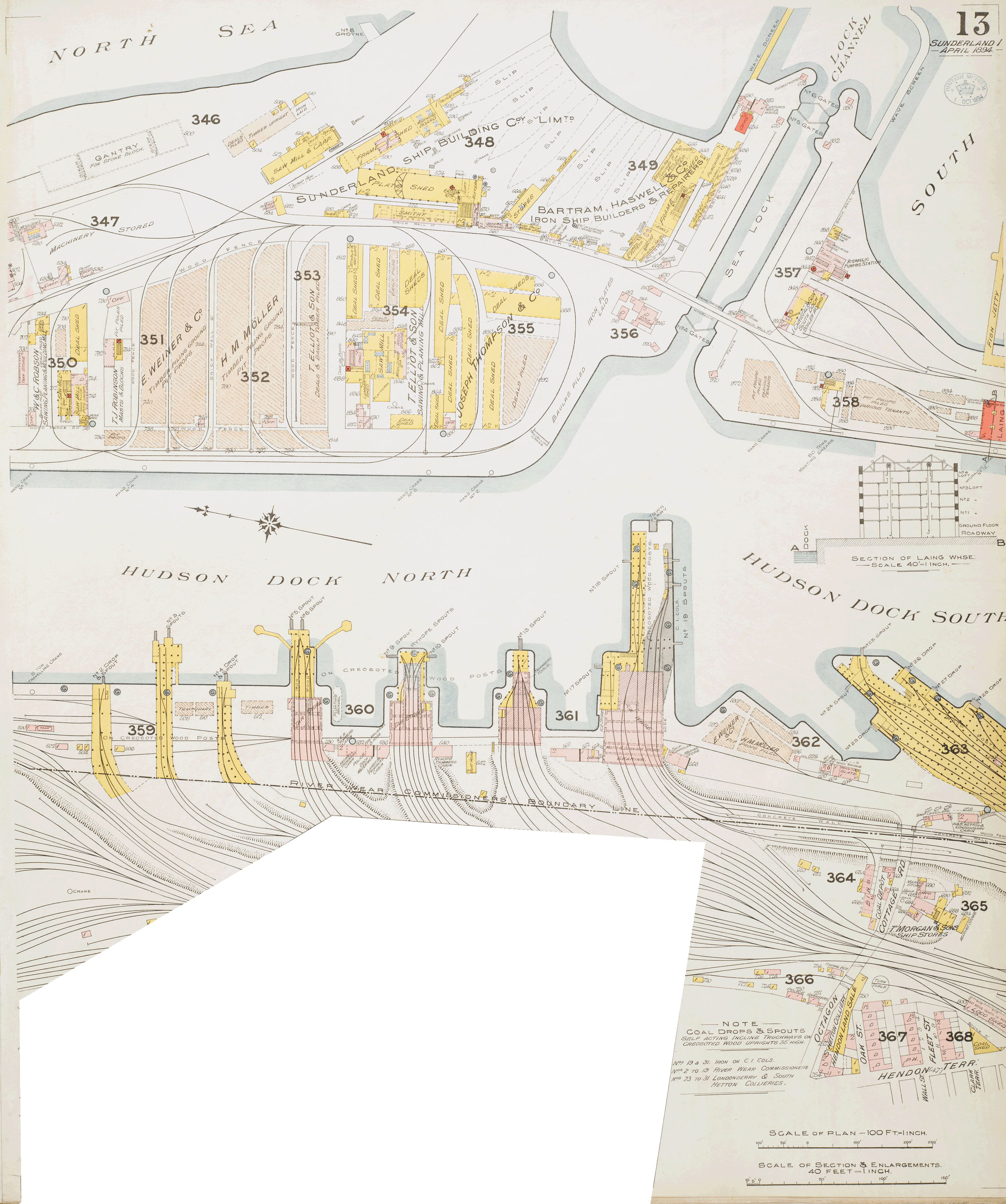
The site of Bartram, Haswell & Co (alongside the sea lock, top right) on an 1894 map of Hudson Dock

In 1889 Haswell retired, Robert Appleby Bartram's sons, George and William, joined the firm and the name was changed to Bartram & Sons. Between 1902 and 1914 it built 10 cargo liners for Ben Line. In 1914 it employed 600 people.

In the First World War the company built ships mostly to private order, but including 10 tramp ships to the Shipping Controller's standard "War B" design for 5,030 GRT ships 412 ft (126 m) long and 52 ft (16 m) beam.

In 1922 the firm became a limited company. George's sons, Robert Appleby Bartram and George Hylton Bartram took over in 1925. From 1921 to 1930 Bartram's built at least 17 tramp steamers.

== The Depression ==
The Great Depression that began in 1929 caused a worldwide slump in shipping. Bartram & Sons completed its last order in September 1930 and had no more for six years. In that time it built only one ship, the 3,829 GRT Eskdene. That was a speculative venture in 1934, without an order, to create work for the yard.

In 1935 the UK Government introduced a "scrap and build" scheme to encourage shipowners to order new ships and sell old ones for scrap. Evans and Reid of Cardiff ordered two tramp ships from Palmer & Sons, Nailsea Court and Nailsea Meadow, which were launched in 1936. Further orders from Evan Thomas, Radcliffe and Company, Evans and Reid and others kept Bartram & Sons in production until November 1938, when it again ran out of orders.

== Revival ==
The Second World War revived demand and in November 1939 Bartram & Sons launched the first of a series of tramp ships to replace tonnage lost to enemy action. In the war the company built 24 cargo ships, 18 of them to standard Ministry of War Transport designs.

The enlistment of men in the armed forces forced civilian employers to admit women to jobs that only men had been allowed to do. In 1943 Bartram & Sons employed its first woman welder, a Mrs Collard.

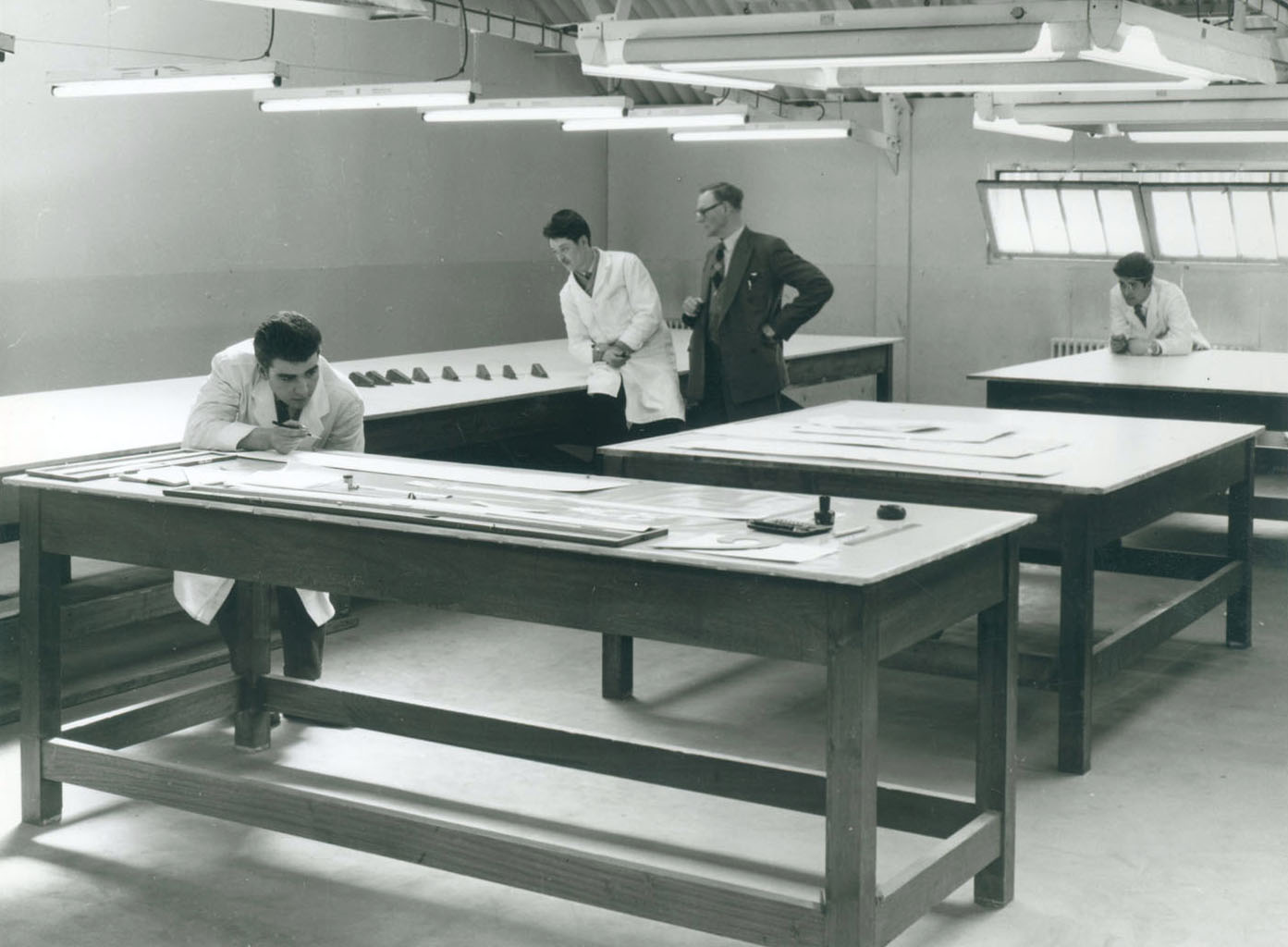
Draughtsmen at work at Bartram & Sons in 1958

Bartram and Sons remained productive after the Second World War, and many of its ships were exported to overseas buyers. In 1952 its South Dock yard was enlarged and one of its berths was extended. In 1961 it had 1,200 employees and in 1964 it took over the fitting-out quay of Short Brothers' yard at Pallion.

== Takeover and closure ==
In 1965 the Geddes Report recommended that Bartram and Sons should merge with other shipbuilders. In 1968 Austin and Pickersgill (A&P) took over Palmer & Sons. In 1977 A&P was nationalised. In 1978 A&P closed Bartram's shipyard and moved all work to its own yard at Southwick.
