= Southwick, Sunderland =

Suburb of Sunderland, England

Coordinates: 54.919349°N 1.406192°W

Southwick
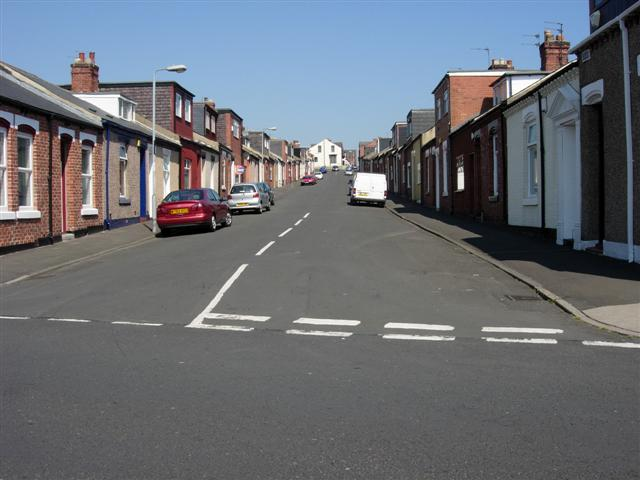
- Darwin Street

- Location within Tyne and Wear
- Population: 10,535 (2011.Ward)
- Metropolitan borough: Sunderland
- Metropolitan county: Tyne and Wear
- Region: North East
- Country: England
- Sovereign state: United Kingdom
- Post town: SUNDERLAND
- Postcode district: SR5
- Police: Northumbria
- Fire: Tyne and Wear
- Ambulance: North East
- UK Parliament: Sunderland Central

Southwick is a former village and now a suburb on the north banks of the River Wear in Sunderland, in the county of Tyne and Wear, England, historically in County Durham. From 1894 to 1928, Southwick was administered by the Southwick-on-Wear Urban District Council, before being absorbed by Sunderland.

Southwick borders with Castletown and Hylton Red House to the west, Monkwearmouth to the east, greenbelt farmland and the suburb of Carley Hill to the north, and the Wear to the south although the Queen Alexandra Bridge links Southwick to Pallion and central Sunderland.

It is home to a police station that services the north of Sunderland. There is a primary school, but no secondary school. Sunderland A.F.C.'s Stadium of Light is visible to the east on the Monkwearmouth side.

Southwick is centered on its village green, a commercial area containing three listed buildings; a World War II war memorial, The Tramcar Inn a public house built in 1906, and a memorial lamp-post built in 1912.

According to Indices of Deprivation published by the Department of the Environment, Transport and the Regions in 2000, Southwick is the most deprived of the 25 wards in Sunderland, the fifth most deprived in Tyne and Wear, and the fifty-fifth in England. .

== Etymology ==
The name Southwick was recorded in the early 12th century as Suthewick in the 16th century as Suddick until the 19th century. It appears to mean "south dwelling/specialised farm" and thus derived from Old English suþ ("south, southern") + wic ("dwelling, specialised farm").

== History ==
Quarrying has taken place in the area for many centuries but it was not until the 17th century that large quarries were built and production substantially increased. Wagonways were built to transport limestone from the quarries.

1698 saw the establishment of glassmaking in Southwick with the opening of Suddick Glasshouse. This was followed by Wearmouth Crown Glassworks in 1786. Southwick Bottleworks was a significant employer from 1846 to 1917.

Southwick was formerly a township and chapelry in the parish of Monk-Wearmouth, in 1866 Southwick became a separate civil parish, on 1 April 1928 the parish was abolished and merged with Sunderland. In 1921 the parish had a population of 14,641. In 1974 it became part of the metropolitan district of Sunderland.

== Shipbuilding ==
Although it is likely that shipbuilding had taken place earlier the first registered shipbuilder was Henry Debord who was in business from 1785 to 1797. On 2 March 1798, the Lord Duncan of 925 tons was launched at Southwick. In 1845, William Pickersgill split from his partners and developed a shipyard at Southwick, although their first ship was not launched until 1854. Between 1865 and 1874 J. L. Thompson and Sons at Southwick built 18 composite vessels (ie ships with iron frames and wooden hulls), but in 1887 did not launch any vessels at all In 1933, J. L. Thompson and Sons shipyard at Southwick was closed. Wear Shipbuilders Ltd launched their first vessel at Southwick in 1943, one of nine yards then open on the Wear At the time of a company merger with Austin's in 1954 the yard was redeveloped at a cost of £3 million. It closed in 1988.

== Sources ==
- Clark, Andrew (2002). The People's History - Sunderland Shipyards. Seaham: The People's History Ltd. ISBN 1-902527-00-3.
- Dodds, Glen Lyndon (2011). A History of Sunderland (Third ed.). Sunderland: Albion Press. ISBN 978-0-9525122-2-6.
