= David Anderson (engineer) =

Scottish civil engineer and lawyer (1880-1953)

Sir David Anderson
- Anderson pictured in 1951
- Born: 1880; Leven, Fife
- Died: 1953 (aged 72–73)
- Citizenship: United Kingdom
- Engineering career
- Discipline: Civil,
- Institutions: Institution of Civil Engineers (president),

Sir David Anderson (6 July 1880–27 March 1953) was a Scottish civil engineer and lawyer.

Anderson was born in 1880 at Leven, Fife, Scotland. In 1921, on his return from Army service, Anderson joined a partnership with fellow engineers Basil Mott and David Hay, forming the company Mott Hay and Anderson. Mott, Hay and Anderson traded until 1989, when it merged with Sir M MacDonald & Partners to form Mott MacDonald.

Anderson was elected president of the Institution of Civil Engineers for the November 1943 to November 1944 session. He was created a Knight Bachelor in 1951.

Professional and academic associations
Preceded by John Edward Thornycroft	President of the Institution of Civil Engineers; November 1943 – November 1944	Succeeded by Francis Wentworth-Shields
