= Mott MacDonald =

UK-based onsultant company

Mott MacDonald Ltd
- Type: Private
- Industry: Multidisciplinary consultancy
- Founded: 1989
- Headquarters: City of London, England
- Area served: International
- Key people: James Harris, Group Chairman; Cathy Travers, Group Managing Director; Denise Bower, Group External Engagement Director; Ian Galbraith, Group Strategy Director; Ed Roud, Group Finance Director
- Number of employees: 19,500 (2026)
- Website: Mott MacDonald Group website

The Mott MacDonald Group is a management, engineering and development consultancy headquartered in the United Kingdom. It employs over 19,500 staff in 150 countries. Mott MacDonald is one of the largest employee-owned companies in the world.

== History ==
Mott MacDonald was formed in 1989 through the merger of Mott, Hay and Anderson and Sir M MacDonald & Partners. Mott, Hay and Anderson was a transportation engineering consultancy responsible for projects such as the London Underground while Sir M MacDonald & Partners was a water engineering consultancy with projects that included the Aswan Dam. The merger made Mott MacDonald one of the first international engineering, management, and development consultancies.

=== Mott, Hay & Anderson ===
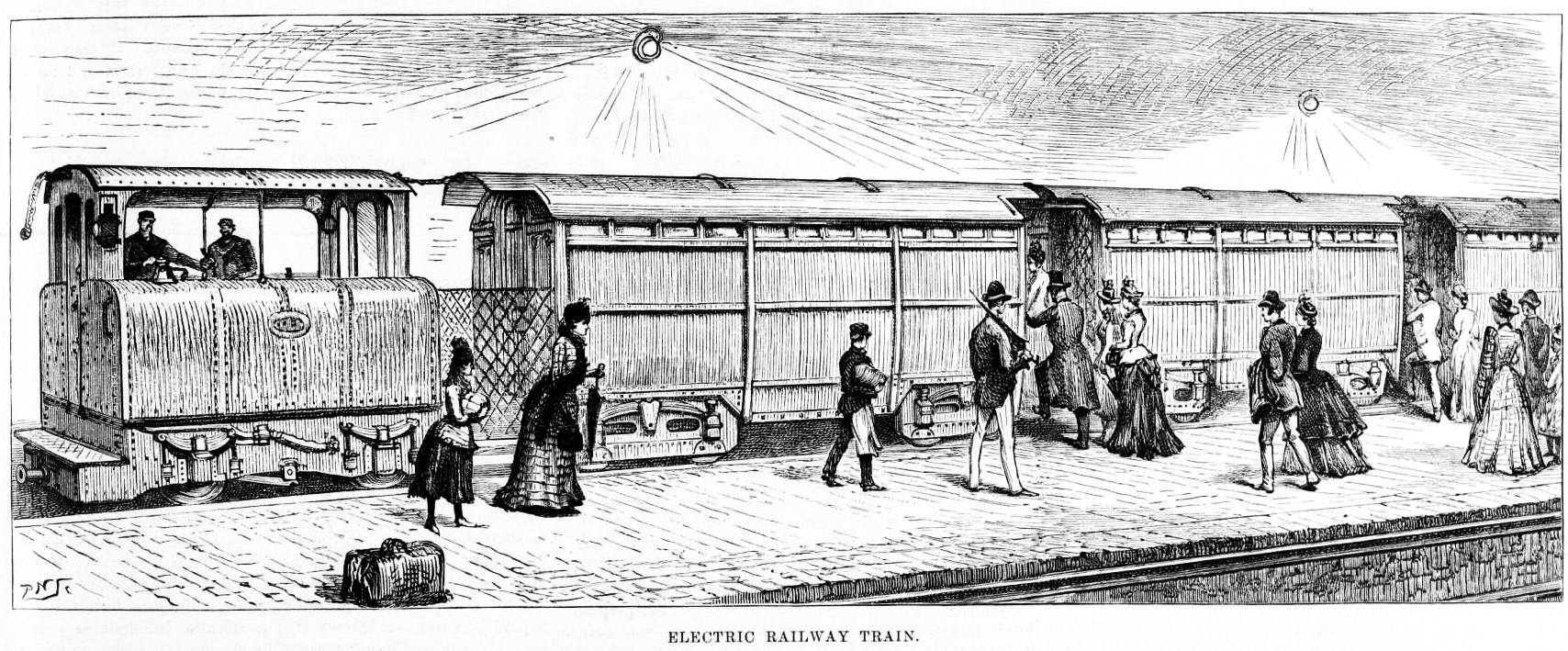
A picture of a City & South London Railway train from the Illustrated London News, 1890

Mott, Hay and Anderson was founded as a private partnership between Basil Mott and David Hay in 1902, with the original firm name of Mott & Hay. Prior to forming the original partnership, Mott and Hay had spent time building London tube railways and Hay had worked on the Blackwall Tunnel. Both engineers had worked together since 1888 on the City & South London Railway under Sir Benjamin Baker and James Henry Greathead. Early projects included the reconstruction and extension of the City and South London Railway (C&SLR), the building and extension of the Central London Railway, the construction of lifts beneath St Mary Woolnoth church at Bank tube station, the underpinning of Clifford's Tower, the reconstruction of Southwark Bridge and the widening of Blackfriars Bridge. Mott and Hay employed a young engineer called David Anderson as resident engineer for the latter project.

The firm also advised on proposals for underground railways in Sydney, Africa, and Russia. David Anderson was made a partner in 1920 after returning from army service. The firm was thereafter known as Mott, Hay and Anderson. During the 1920s, it designed the rolling bridge over the River Dee at Queensferry, the Tyne Bridge in Newcastle and the Trent Bridge in Nottingham. It also designed the enlargement of the City & South London Railway tunnels and their extension past Camden Town and Clapham South to form the Northern line of the London Underground.

Both founding partners died in 1938, at which time most of the construction projects stopped. During the 1940s after World War II, it began expanding and working on additional projects, some of which including repairing of roads and bridges damaged or destroyed during the war, and, later, included the Victoria line of the London Underground and Australia's Melbourne Underground Rail Loop. The firm continued in these fields until the merger with Sir M MacDonald & Partners in 1989, at which time it was also working on the Channel Tunnel between the United Kingdom and France beneath the English Channel.

=== Sir M MacDonald & Partners ===
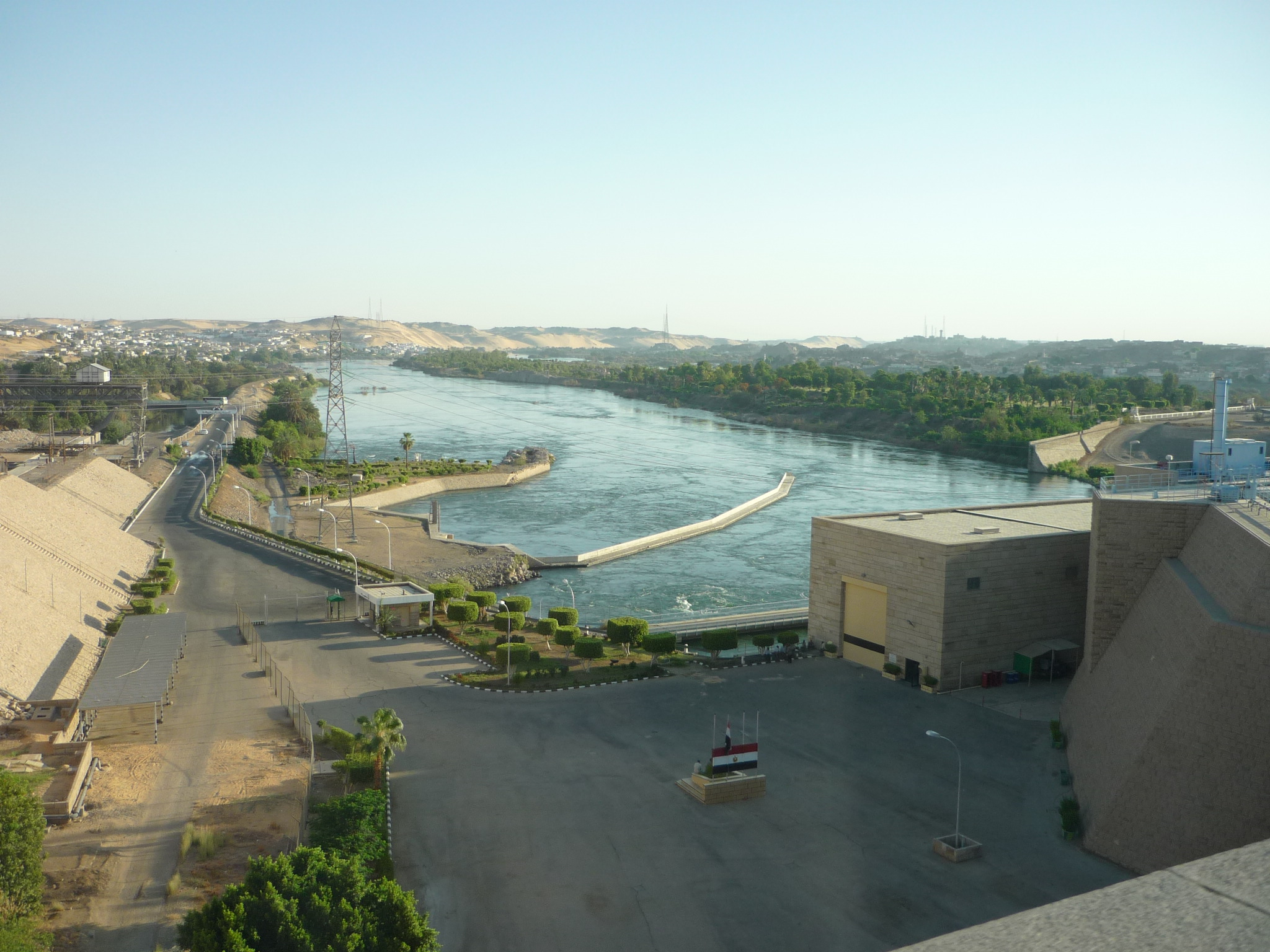
View of the Nile River from the Aswan Low Dam in Egypt

Sir M MacDonald & Partners was named after Murdoch Macdonald, a British civil engineer and later politician. The company formed out of affairs relating directly to British infrastructure development in Egypt between 1890 and 1930, in particular MacDonald's involvement with Aswan Low Dam, starting in 1898. MacDonald was involved in the original construction of the Aswan Dam and later became an advisor to the Egyptian Ministry of Public Works after the dam was completed in 1902. He became closely associated with the development and first heightening of the Aswan Low Dam for the development of hydroelectricity.

MacDonald retired from his service with the Egyptian government in 1921 and returned to Britain where he began a partnership with Archibald MacCorquodale. In 1927, the two were later joined by PH East (also an engineer in the Egyptian government from 1907 to 1926) and Oswald Longstaff Prowde, at which time the name of the company was changed to Sir M MacDonald & Partners. One of the first major projects of the partnership included the second heightening of the Aswan Low Dam, which continued from 1929 through design and construction stages until 1933. The firm continued on projects through its merger with Mott, Hay and Anderson in 1989.

=== Post-merger ===
Mott MacDonald began to expand after the 1989 merger. Early acquisitions included the consultancies of Husband & Company as well as James Williamson & Partners. These acquisitions brought Mott MacDonald's total staffing to 3,300. Its 1994 acquisition of Ewbank Preece expanded its reach into the power and telecommunication fields, with its 2000 purchase of Cambridge Education Associates expanding its education consultancy. Additional early acquisitions included India-based firm Dalal Consultants in 2001, cost consultants Franklin + Andrews in 2002 and health practice HLSP in 2003. In 2007, Mott MacDonald bought Dutch firm Euroconsult BMB who specialized in international development and natural resource management.

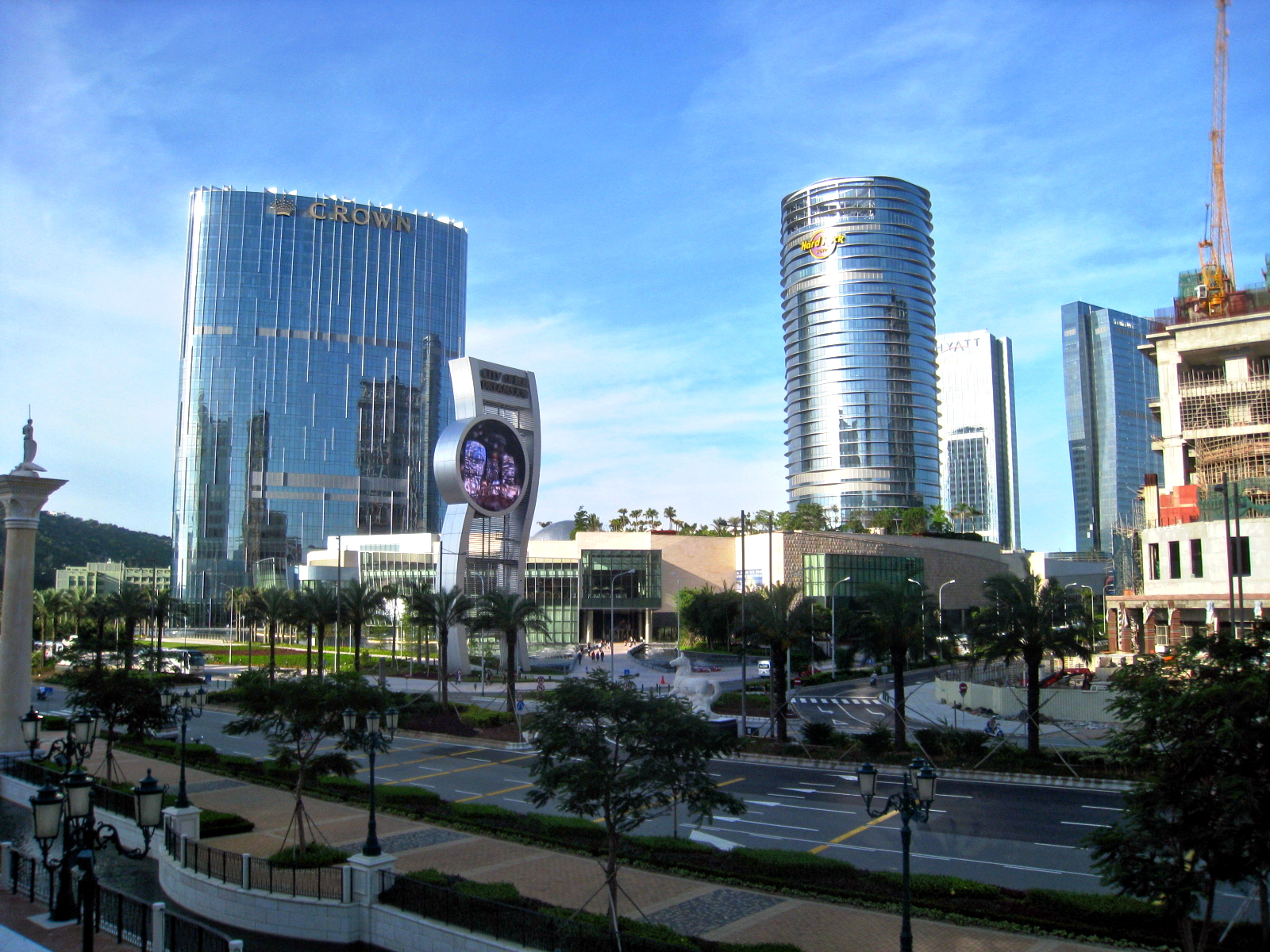
Exterior view of The City of Dreams in Macau in 2009

2008 marked the first year that Mott MacDonald earned more internationally than it did in the United Kingdom, earning it recognition by New Civil Engineer as the International Consultant of the Year. Its top two international projects for that year were the Delhi Metro in India and Macau City of Dreams in China. The same year, the firm had 7,021 staff assigned to overseas projects, with 6,669 working overseas.

Mott MacDonald purchased Fulcrum Consulting in 2009 as a way of expanding its sustainable energy consultancy in the building sector. Fulcrum was a building services engineer consultancy and a founding member of the UK Green Building Council, specializing in green and eco-friendly engineering and design. Fulcrum was responsible for projects such as the Darwin Centre and considered a pioneer of low-energy building techniques. MacDonald also expanded to open principal offices in Turkey, Kazakhstan, Albania, and Serbia while opening smaller offices in throughout Africa. It also purchased Merz & McLellan, a South African electrical engineering consultancy. 2009 also marked the opening of Mbombela Stadium, a stadium in South Africa for which Mott MacDonald designed the roof. In 2010, the firm added South African healthcare and development specialist HDA, and Australian engineering consultancy Hughes Trueman to its portfolio. In 2011, Mott MacDonald purchased Australian firm Mortimer Project Management and opened an office in Auckland, New Zealand.

Mott MacDonald continued to expand its international presence in April 2013 with the purchase of Habtec Engenharia Ambiental, a Brazil-based environmental consultancy with 80 people. Later the same month, it purchased PD Naidoo & Associates, a consultancy based in South Africa with 550 people. The acquisitions added to the company's previous purchases of Canadian consultancy Engineering Northwest, oil and gas firm Procyon, and the oil and gas operations of Mouchel.

In 2014, Mott MacDonald acquired AWT, a specialist water technology and consulting company based in New Zealand and Australia.

During 2014, Mott MacDonald acquired its UK water industry design and build joint venture partner Bentley Holdings Ltd (including its subsidiary company JN Bentley Ltd). The move followed a 15-year partnership through the joint venture Mott MacDonald Bentley.

In 2015, Mott MacDonald and Hatch announced that the Hatch Mott MacDonald (HMM) joint venture would become two distinct businesses. HMM’s Canada business would become part of Hatch while HMM's US business would become part of Mott MacDonald. HMM’s pipelines business, which operated in both Canada and the US, would also join Mott MacDonald.

In 2024, Mott MacDonald generated revenue of £2.52bn revenue (up 6% on 2023's £2.37bn) and reported a pre-tax profit, up 9%, of £123.3m.

== Projects ==
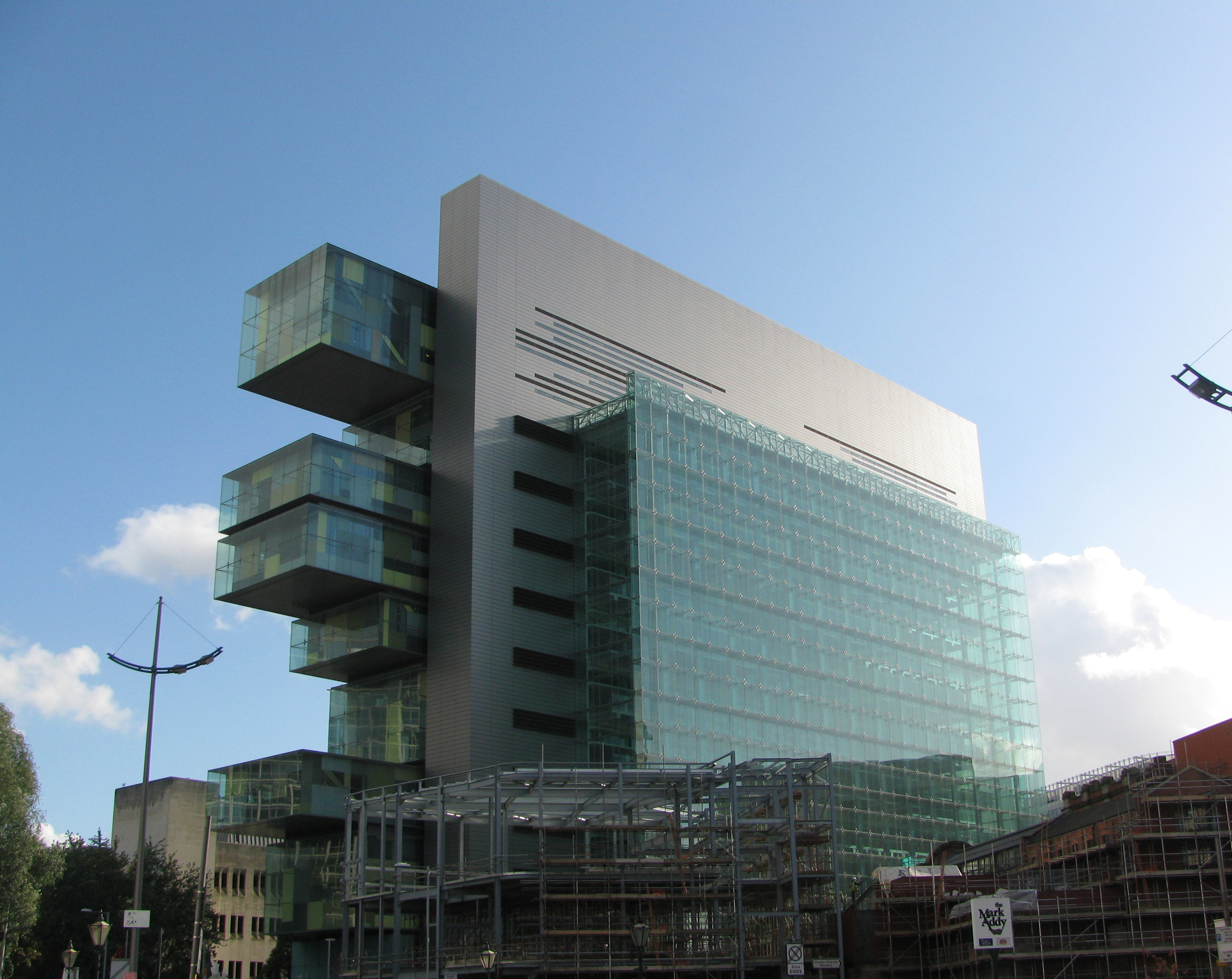
View of the Manchester Civil Justice Centre from Bridge Street taken in 2008

Mott MacDonald has worked on many notable projects. It was the design engineer for Heathrow Terminal 5 sub-structures and foundations, as well as providing rail assurance services, tunnelling advice and project and program management. The project began in 2002, with construction being completed in 2008.

Mott MacDonald was the engineer and worked with Denton Corker Marshall on the design of the Manchester Civil Justice Centre which was completed in 2007. The Centre was the largest court complex in the United Kingdom built in a century and has won 26 awards for its design, including the Major Project of the Year Award in 2008 from Building.com. The Centre was designed and constructed to have minimal impact on the environment and included a narrow form, acoustic privacy, and natural ventilation. It was also featured in the book Microgeneration: Low Energy Strategies for Larger Buildings for its sustainability features.

In 2012, Mott MacDonald was chosen as the concept designer for engineering the New Mosaic Stadium.

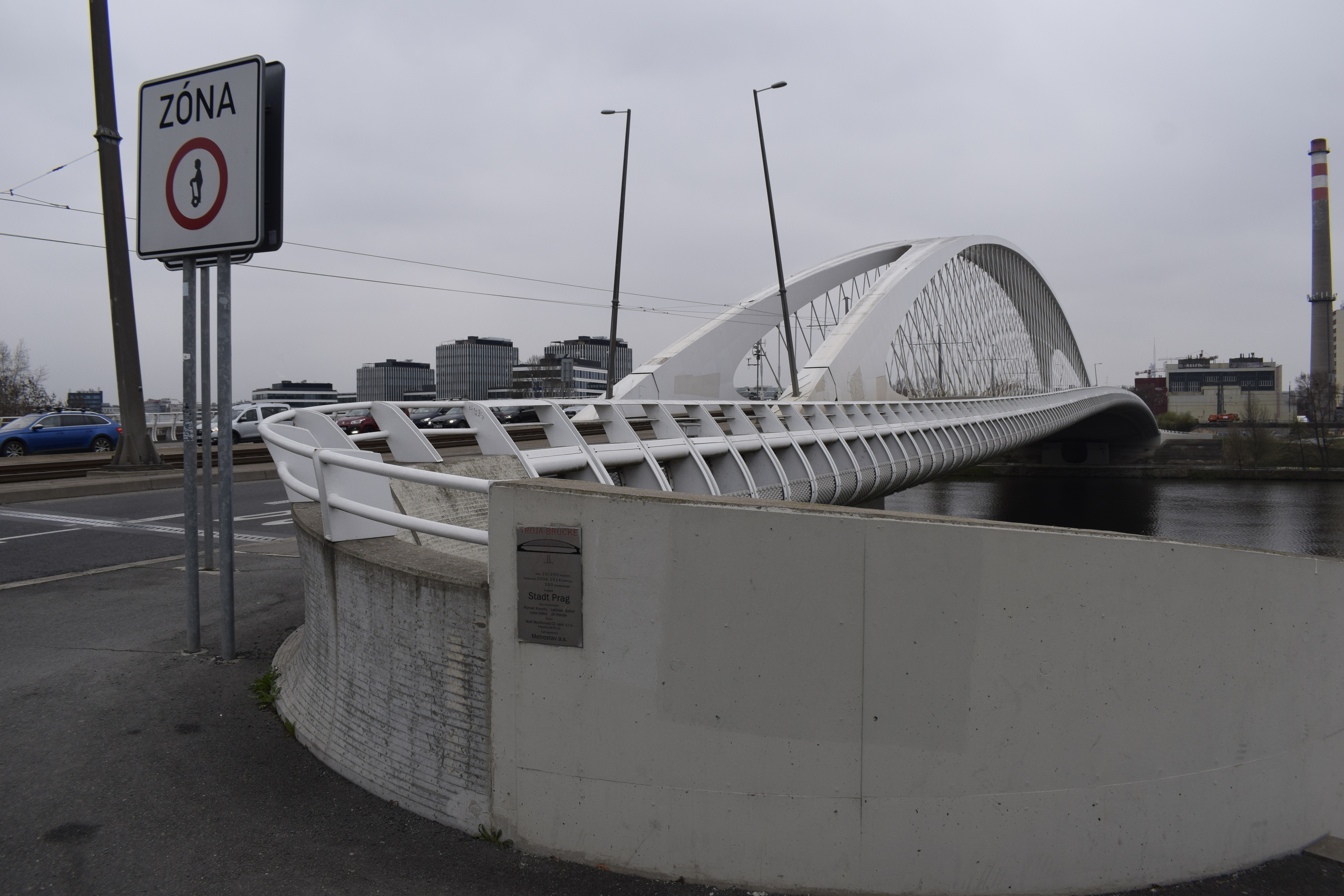
Designed the Troja-Bridge in Prague 2013

Mott MacDonald was chosen to be part of the design-build team for a $41 million bridge rehabilitation project announced by New York Governor Andrew Cuomo in January 2014. The project is scheduled to repair bridges in Niagara County in the western part of New York.

The $125 million contract for engineering the single bore tunnel segment of the Silicon Valley BART extension was awarded to a joint venture bid placed by Mott MacDonald and San Francisco based PGH Wong Engineering in January 2019.

Since 1998, Mott MacDonald has been providing waste water management for Union Pacific. In January 2018, a Mott MacDonald employee distracted by a cell phone call left a tank unattended for an hour while working at the railroad's Albina Yard in Portland, Oregon, United States. The tank overflowed and released several thousands gallons of oil into the environment according to US attorneys. 1,800 gallons of the released oil was estimated to have been lost into the Willamette River. The former employee Robert LaRue Webb II was convicted with violating the Clean Water Act in October 2019 and was sentenced to a probation and a fine for negligently causing the oil release. The clean up and emergency response cost the railroad over $500,000. United States Coast Guard, EPA and Oregon Department of Environmental Quality assisted with the clean up.
