= Mott, Hay and Anderson =

Civil engineering company

- Company type: Partnership
- Industry: Consultancy
- Founded: 1902
- Defunct: 1989
- Fate: Merged with Sir M. MacDonald & Partners
- Successor: Mott MacDonald
- Headquarters: London, UK

Mott, Hay and Anderson (MHA) was a successful 20th century firm of consulting civil engineers based in the United Kingdom. The company traded until 1989, when it merged with Sir M MacDonald & Partners to form Mott MacDonald.

== History ==
=== Early years ===
The company was founded as a private partnership between Basil Mott and David Hay on 30 July 1902. Prior to forming the partnership both had spent time building London tube railways and Hay had worked on the Blackwall Tunnel, so it was no surprise that they concentrated on heavy civil engineering projects such as bridges, tunnels, railways and docks. Early projects included the reconstruction and extension of the City & South London Railway, the building and extension of the Central London Railway, the construction of lifts beneath St Mary Woolnoth church at Bank Underground station, the underpinning of Clifford's Tower, the reconstruction of Southwark Bridge and the widening of Blackfriars Bridge. Mott and Hay employed a young engineer called David Anderson as resident engineer for the latter project.

The firm also advised on proposals for underground railways in Sydney, Africa and Russia. David Anderson was made a partner in 1920 after returning from army service. The firm was thereafter known as Mott, Hay and Anderson (MHA).

During the 1920s, MHA designed the rolling bridge over the river Dee at Queensferry, the Wearmouth Bridge in Sunderland and the Trent Bridge in Nottingham. They also designed the enlargement of the City & South London Railway tunnels and their extension past Camden Town and Clapham South to form the Northern line of London Underground.

In 1920, Basil Mott joined forces with Sir Maurice Fitzmaurice and John Brodie to advise on the best way to build a new crossing of the river Mersey in Liverpool. In 1922 a tunnel was recommended. Mott, Hay and Anderson subsequently designed the works and supervised the construction of the tunnel. The tunnel, named Queensway was opened in July 1934.

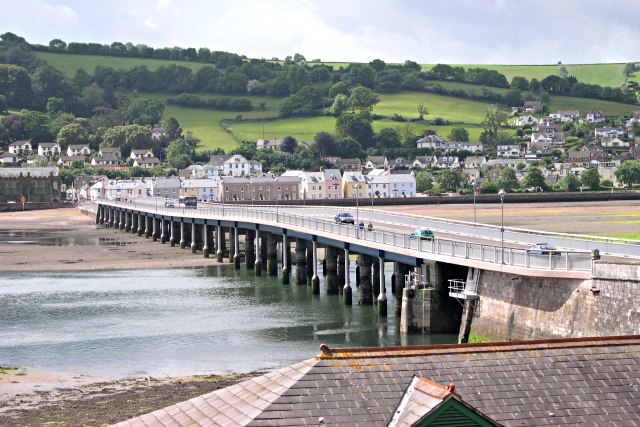
Shaldon Bridge 1928-1931

In the 1930s, the firm designed the first bolted concrete tunnel linings, for the London Passenger Transport Board. The new tunnel linings were used on the Ilford extension of the Central line between Redbridge and Newbury Park. MHA designed a road tunnel at Dartford and supervised the construction of its pilot tunnel beneath the Thames, but preparations for construction of the full-size tunnel were stopped in 1931 due to economic difficulties. G L Groves became a partner in 1933, but it was decided to leave the name of the company unchanged.

In 1935, David Anderson attended the opening ceremony of the Moscow Metro, which the firm had provided advice to as far back as 1912. Other works in this period included Lots Road power station and construction of escalator tunnels in London Underground stations.

Both founding partners died in 1938.

Normal construction work mostly stopped in September 1939, and during the wartime years MHA acted as engineer for the construction of five of the ten London deep-level shelters, for the construction of armaments factories and for the repair of bomb damage on various British bridges, tunnels and docks. MHA also oversaw the conversion of the unfinished Central line tunnels to aircraft components factories.

=== After World War II ===
In the late 1940s, MHA designed road, pedestrian and cycle tunnels under the River Tyne (Tyne Tunnel) though the road tunnel was not built until the 1960s. Further commissions for road tunnels were received for the revitalised Dartford tunnel in 1956, Mersey Kingsway tunnel in 1966, Blackwall southbound tunnel in 1967, second Dartford tunnel in 1972, and the Hatfield, Bell Common, Holmesdale and Penmaenbach tunnels in the 1980s. In all, MHA were involved in the construction of all but five of the UK's longest road tunnels (the exceptions being the Heathrow Cargo Tunnel, Heathrow Main Tunnel, Clyde Tunnel, Limehouse Link tunnel and Rotherhithe Tunnel).

In the same period, MHA worked with Freeman Fox & Partners to design the Forth Road Bridge and the Severn Bridge. Other bridge commissions in this period include the Tamar Bridge located next to Brunel's 1859 Royal Albert Bridge, the Kuala Lepar bridge across the Pahang River in Malaysia and the new London Bridge (including the removal of Rennie's 1831 bridge and its reconstruction in Arizona).

When work began on London Underground's Victoria line in the early 1960s, responsibility for the tunnelling works was split between Mott, Hay and Anderson and Sir William Halcrow and Partners, each acting as Engineer for approximately half the length of the line. MHA partner John Bartlett patented the bentonite-slurry shield tunnel boring machine (UK patent 1083322) and a trial length of tunnel was drilled successfully through poor ground conditions at New Cross in London. The slurry shield design paved the way for the earth pressure balance TBM commonly used today.

=== Modern times ===
In the early 1970s, an alliance was formed with Australian consultants John Connell Group for the design and construction of the Melbourne Underground Rail Loop, opened in 1981. The alliance continued with bridge and tunnel works across Australia and Southeast Asia, culminating in the formation of a joint venture company (Mott Connell) in Hong Kong for the design of infrastructure in and around Chek Lap Kok airport, including the Lantau Link.

As time went on, many of the assets built by the founders of the company began to show their age. The increase in traffic flow through the Queensway Tunnel meant that the ventilation system could no longer cope and additional ventilation tunnels were built under MHA's supervision in the early 1960s. In the 1980s the Blackwall northbound tunnel, which David Hay had worked on 90 years before, was refurbished by Murphy construction under the supervision of MHA.

In 1979 they began economical and technical research on possibilities for the Medellín Metro.

The firm stopped trading as Mott, Hay and Anderson in 1989 when it merged with Sir M MacDonald & Partners to form Mott MacDonald. The firm of Mott MacDonald has since expanded its field of operations far beyond traditional consulting engineering (for example, it currently runs the education department of the London Borough of Islington).

== Channel Tunnel ==
Mott, Hay and Anderson were heavily involved in the design and construction of the Channel Tunnel between France and Great Britain.

The firm were first involved in a proposal to build a tunnel between Britain and France in 1930, but this was unsuccessful. The design proposed in this feasibility study – twin running tunnels with a central service tunnel – was similar to the design eventually built.

In 1957, the firm acted as adviser to the Banque de Paris et des Pays-Bas for another unsuccessful scheme.

In the early 1970s, the firm capitalised on work funded by British Rail to develop means of calculating the aerodynamic behaviour of high-speed trains in long, complex tunnel systems (the resulting methods are still used today to design tunnels for rail traffic). MHA and French firm SETEC were appointed as joint advisers to the British and French Channel Tunnel Companies, who proposed a workable scheme. Exploratory construction contracts were let, but the British Government abandoned the scheme in 1975, with the first tunnel boring machine (built to dig the service tunnel) literally sitting on its launch frame. Despite the lack of funding, a short section of service tunnel was dug beneath the English coast through ground that had been filled with instruments to assess the performance of the TBM. This section of service tunnel was incorporated into the successful scheme a decade later.

In the late 1970s, British Rail and SNCF appointed MHA and Setec as advisors to a smaller-scale project which also came to nothing.

In the early 1980s, Mott, Hay and Anderson provided design services to two of the consortia bidding for the Channel Tunnel (Euroroute, who proposed a road tunnel, and the Channel Tunnel Group). The bid by the Channel Tunnel Group and France Manche was successful: the two bidders joined forces and reformed as an operating company Eurotunnel and construction contractor TransManche Link. MHA were appointed as the contractor's designer for the works on the British site (designing temporary works, bored tunnel linings, cut-and-cover tunnels, earthworks, trackwork, terminals & sea defences) and as designer for the ventilation, aerodynamics, smoke control and refrigeration systems in the entire tunnel.

Between 1986 and 1994, the company expended approximately 650-man-years of work on the design of the Channel Tunnel.

== Sources ==
- Mott, Hay & Anderson, Consulting Civil Engineers. Newman Neame Ltd. 1965.
- Mott MacDonald (2002). One hundred years of transportation.
- Greathead, J.H. (1895). "The City and South London Railway". Minutes of the Proceedings of the Institution of Civil Engineers. 123.
- Mott, B.; Hay, D. (1905). "Underground Railways in Great Britain". Transactions of the American Society of Civil Engineers. 54, part F.
- Hay, D.; Fitzmaurice, M. (1898). "The Blackwall Tunnel". Journal of the Institution of Civil Engineers.
- Anderson, D. "Tube Railway Tunnelling". Transactions of the Liverpool Engineering Society. 45: 201–228.
- Anderson, D. "Paper 5056: The Construction of the Mersey Tunnel". Journal of the Institution of Civil Engineers. 2: 473–544. doi:10.1680/ijoti.1936.14846.
- "Anderson on Construction of the Mersey Tunnel". Journal of the Institution of Civil Engineers. 2: 649–660. doi:10.1680/ijoti.1936.14856.
- Mersey Tunnels Joint Committee (1934). The Story of the Mersey Tunnel, officially named Queensway.
- Mott, Hay & Anderson (December 1949). "Some Recent Tunnelling in Great Britain". The Consulting Engineer: 344–351.
- Kell, J. (1962). "The Dartford Tunnel". Journal of the Institution of Civil Engineers.
- Mott MacDonald (1994). The Channel Tunnel; A Designer's Perspective.
- Henson, D.A.; Fox, J.A. (1974). "Transient flows in tunnel complexes of the type proposed for the Channel Tunnel". Proc. Inst. Mech. Eng. 188: 153–167. doi:10.1243/PIME_PROC_1974_188_018_02.
- Ellison, B. (July 1995). "Cooling the Channel Tunnel". Journal of the Mine Ventilation Society of South Africa: 194–202.
