= Tyne Tunnel =

Two road tunnels under the River Tyne in northern England

Coordinates: 54°59′16″N 1°29′08″W

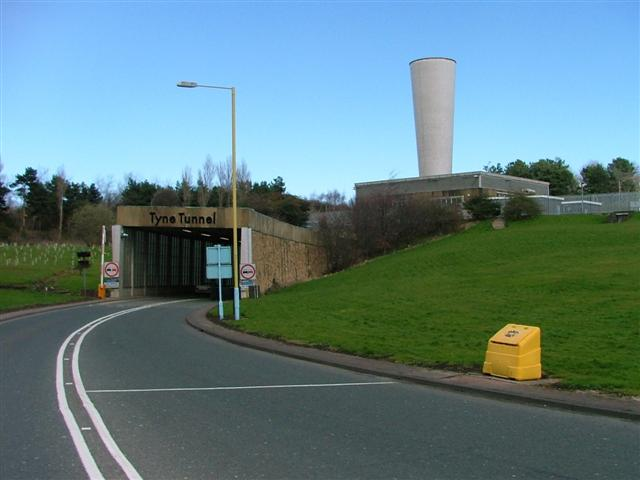
Tyne Tunnel northern entrance before refurbishment

The Tyne Tunnel is the name given to a pair of two-lane vehicular toll tunnels under the River Tyne in North East England. Originally opened in 1967 and expanded in 2011, the tunnels connect the town of Jarrow on the south bank of the river with North Shields and Wallsend on the northern side. The tunnels are approximately 7 miles (11 km) downstream, to the east of Newcastle upon Tyne. The Tyne Tunnel constitutes a part of the A19 road.

== History ==
Tyne Tunnel Act 1946
- Act of Parliament
- Parliament of the United Kingdom
- Long title: An Act to authorise the construction of tunnels for vehicular and pedestrian traffic under the river Tyne between Wallsend in the county of Northumberland and Jarrow in the county of Durham and approaches to such tunnels and for other purposes.
- Citation: 9 & 10 Geo. 6. c. xl

Dates
- Royal assent: 26 July 1946

Text of statute as originally enacted

Tyne Tunnel Act 1956
- Act of Parliament
- Parliament of the United Kingdom
- Long title: An Act to authorise a variation of certain works authorised by the Tyne Tunnel Act 1946 and to extend the time for the construction of certain other works authorised by that Act to confer further borrowing and other powers on the Durham County Council and on the Northumberland County Council to empower the Councils to discontinue and abandon the ferry across the river Tyne known as the Jarrow-Howdon Ferry and for other purposes.
- Citation: 4 & 5 Eliz. 2. c. lxvi

Dates
- Royal assent: 5 July 1956

Text of statute as originally enacted

Tyne Tunnel Act 1960
- Act of Parliament
- Parliament of the United Kingdom
- Long title: An Act to authorise variations of the works authorised by the Tyne Tunnel Acts 1946 and 1956 including the construction of new works to amend those Acts in certain respects to confer further powers in connection with those works including the taking of tolls and for other purposes.
- Citation: 8 & 9 Eliz. 2. c. xxxix

Dates
- Royal assent: 29 July 1960

Text of statute as originally enacted

A scheme for the construction of a set of three tunnels under the Tyne was put forward by the Durham and Northumberland county councils in 1937. After prolonged negotiations with the Ministry of Transport, the scheme was approved in 1943. The Tyne Tunnel Act 1946 (9 & 10 Geo. 6. c. xl), the legislative instrument necessary to enable the construction of the tunnels, received royal assent in 1946. Postwar restrictions on capital expenditure delayed the construction of the vehicular tunnel, but work started on the smaller tunnels for pedestrians and cyclists in 1947.

== First Tyne motor vehicle tunnel ==
Tyne Tunnel
- Interactive map of Tyne Tunnel

Overview
- Route: A19
- Crosses: River Tyne
- Start: Jarrow
- End: Howdon

Operation
- Constructed: Edmund Nuttall Limited
- Opened: 1968
- Closed: 25 February 2011
- Reopened: 21 November 2011
- Owner: North East Combined Authority
- Operator: TT2 Ltd
- Traffic: Motor vehicles

Technical
- No. of lanes: 2
- Operating speed: 30 mph (48 km/h)

The vehicle tunnel is 5,500 feet (1,700 metres) long and has a diameter of 31 ft 3 in (9.5 m) with a roadbed 24 ft (7.3 m). It was built by Edmund Nuttall Limited and was opened by Queen Elizabeth II on 19 October 1967, but commenced operational use only in 1968, on completion of the northern link roads. It was designed to handle 25,000 vehicles per day. The original toll for cars was 2s 6d (12.5 pence). On completion of the second Tyne road tunnel, which opened with a single lane in each direction, the original 1967 Tyne Tunnel closed in February 2011 for a complete revamp, which included the installation of a safety corridor throughout its length. Once this work was complete, it reopened in November 2011 as the northbound tunnel, leaving the new tunnel to handle southbound traffic.

== Second Tyne motor vehicle tunnel ==
New Tyne Crossing
- Interactive map of New Tyne Crossing

Overview
- Route: A19
- Crosses: River Tyne
- Start: Howdon
- End: Jarrow

Operation
- Work began: 2008
- Opened: 25 February 2011
- Owner: North East Combined Authority
- Operator: TT2 Ltd
- Traffic: Motor vehicles
- Toll: Free (motorcycles); £2.50 (under 3.5 t); £5.00 (over 3.5 t)

Technical
- No. of lanes: 2
- Operating speed: 40 mph (64 km/h)

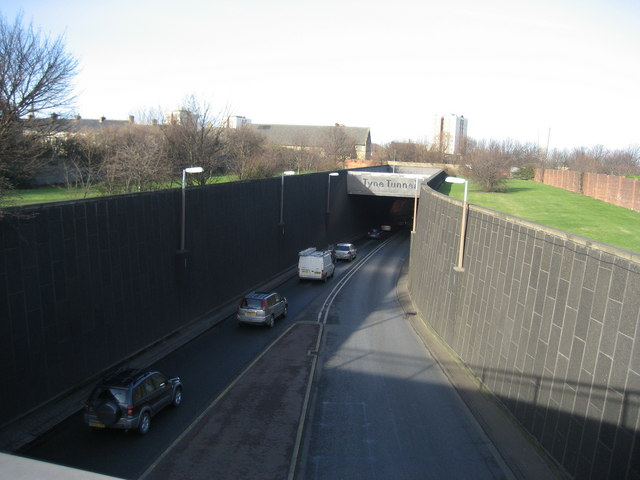
Southern entrance

In March 2004, the Tyne and Wear Integrated Transport Authority launched a scheme to build a second, £139 million tunnel. The tunnel is slightly to the east of the existing tunnel, and the pairing allows each tunnel to serve two lanes of traffic, each travelling in the same direction; the original tunnel had two single lanes of traffic in opposing directions, representing an avoidable risk. The tunnel is 1.6 kilometres (0.99 mi) in length.

River Tyne (Tunnels) Order 2005
- Statutory Instrument
- Parliament of the United Kingdom
- Citation: SI 2005/2222

Dates
- Made: 5 August 2005
- Commencement: 26 August 2005
Other legislation
Made under	Transport and Works Act 1992; Tyne Tunnels Act 1998

The UK government gave the go-ahead for the scheme in July 2005. Construction work started in spring 2008, with the new tunnel opening to two-lane bi-directional traffic on 25 February 2011, at which point the original tunnel closed for a ten-month refurbishment.

The timeline for the new Tyne Tunnel was as follows:

- Transfer tunnels and staff to concessionaire: 1 February 2008
- Main work started: Spring 2008
- New tunnel opened: end of February 2011
- Existing tunnel closed for refurbishment: end of February 2011
- Both existing and new tunnel fully operational and open: end of November 2011. Originally this was planned for January 2012; however, both refurbishment of the old tunnel was completed earlier than expected and both tunnels were open by lunchtime on 21 November 2011.

The tunnel was constructed under a private finance initiative 30-year "design–build–finance–operate" contract by Bouygues Construction.

Onshore sections of the new tunnel were built using the cut-and-cover method. Under-river sections of the tunnel were prefabricated, floated into position, immersed into a dredged trench, and covered with rocks. By beginning of November 2009, the land approaches to the tunnel had been excavated, and construction of the tunnel, in four 300-foot (90 m) sections, had been completed nearby. The dredger used to excavate the river section of the tunnel cutting arrived on site on 4 November 2009 to excavate 400,000 cubic metres of sediment, which was used to infill the defunct Tyne Dock, reclaiming 13 acres (53,000 m^{2}) of land for use by Port of Tyne. Both ends of the tunnel finally met on 26 May 2010.

== Safety ==
The new tunnel is fitted with a fixed fire suppression system which releases a fine mist to contain fires to help motorists leave safely and to prevent damage to the tunnel structure. There is also a separate evacuation corridor which runs adjacent to the main tunnel. The old tunnel, now fully refurbished, includes many of the same safety features.

The New Tyne crossing is claimed to be one of the safest in the UK, thanks to a state-of-the-art active fire suppression system which is now included in its design. It is the first in the UK to be fitted with a water mist active fire suppression system, and will further ensure the safety of thousands of people who will travel through it every day.

The original 1960s-built tunnel was slated as of one of the least safe in Europe in 2000, according to a study. Inspectors visited 25 major tunnels around Europe after fire devastated the Mont Blanc Tunnel under the Alps between France and Italy. The Tyne Tunnel was officially rated as "poor" and languished near the bottom of the European league table. The inspectors found it had no automatic fire alarm system, poor lighting, no laybys or hard shoulder, and an emergency walkway that could be reached only by able-bodied people. They also criticised its smoke extraction system. These deficiencies were addressed during the refurbishment of the original road tunnel in 2011.

== Tolls ==
Tyne Tunnel (Revision of Tolls and Traffic Classification) Order 2001
- Statutory Instrument
- Parliament of the United Kingdom
- Citation: SI 2001/2960

Dates
- Made: 23 August 2001
- Commencement: 28 August 2001
Other legislation
Repeals/revokes	Tyne Tunnel Tolls (Revision of Tolls) Order 1999
Made under	Tyne and Wear Act 1976

River Tyne (Tunnels) (Revision of Tolls) Order 2012
- Statutory Instrument
- Parliament of the United Kingdom
- Citation: SI 2012/3053

Dates
- Made: 4 December 2012
- Commencement: 1 January 2013
Other legislation
Repeals/revokes	River Tyne (Tunnels) (Revision of Tolls) Order 2011
Made under	Tyne and Wear Act 1976

As of June 2025 the toll charge is free for motorcycles, £2.50 for vehicles up to 3.5 tonnes and £5 for heavier vehicles. Blue Badge holders can apply for an exemption account. A 10% discount is available to those who pre-pay via the Internet.

In May 2020, the operator of the Tyne Tunnel, TT2, introduced an option to 'pay later' to minimise contact between customers and staff to reduce the spread of COVID 19.

In November 2021, the Tyne Tunnel launched open-road-tolling, a cashless system that saw the complete removal of barriers and physical payment booths.

== Tyne cyclist and pedestrian tunnels ==
Next vehicle crossing upstream	River Tyne	Next vehicle crossing downstream
Tyne Bridge; A167 and 725	Tyne Tunnel; Grid reference NZ329660	None; North Sea
Next crossing upstream	River Tyne	Next crossing downstream
Tyne Cyclist & Pedestrian Tunnels; Tunnel	Tyne Tunnel; Grid reference NZ329660	Shields Ferry; Pedestrian ferry and 1
