= Swing Bridge, River Tyne =

Bridge over the River Tyne, England

Swing Bridge
- The Swing Bridge across the River Tyne; photograph facing Gateshead
- Coordinates: 54.9674°N 1.6076°W
- OS grid reference: NZ251637
- Carries: Motor vehicles; Pedestrians
- Crosses: River Tyne
- Locale: Tyneside
- Owner: Port of Tyne Authority
- Heritage status: Grade II* listed
- Website: www.portoftyne.co.uk/about-us/history/heritage-sites/heritage-sites

Characteristics
- Design: Swing bridge
- Total length: 171 m (561 ft)
- Width: 14 m (46 ft)
- Longest span: 85.5 m (281 ft)
- Clearance below: 4.42 m (14.5 ft)

History
- Construction end: 1876
- Construction cost: £240,000
- Opened: 15 June 1876

Location
- Interactive map of Swing Bridge

The Swing Bridge is a swing bridge over the River Tyne, England, connecting Newcastle upon Tyne and Gateshead, and lying between the Tyne Bridge and the High Level Bridge. It is a Grade II* listed structure.

== History ==
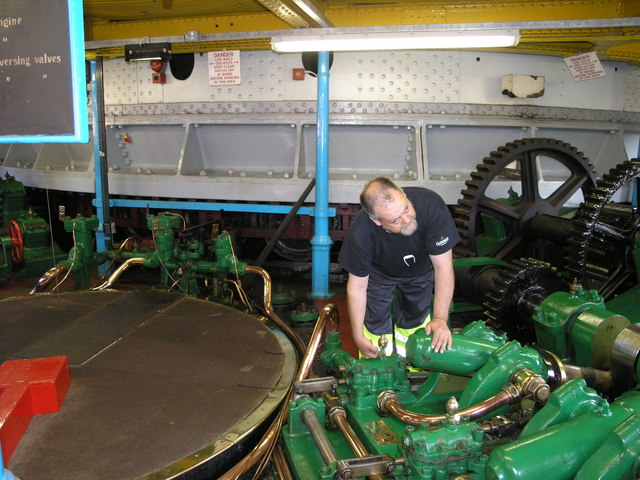
The machine room, showing one of Armstrong's original three-cylinder oscillating hydraulic motors

The Swing Bridge stands on the site of the Old Tyne Bridges of 1270 and 1781, and probably of the original Roman Pons Aelius bridge.

The previous bridge on the site was demolished in 1868 to enable larger ships to move upstream to William Armstrong's works. The hydraulic Swing Bridge was designed and paid for by Armstrong, with work beginning in 1873. It was first used for road traffic on 15 June 1876 and opened for river traffic on 17 July 1876. At the time of construction it was the largest swing bridge ever built. The construction cost was £240,000.

The hydraulic power used to move the bridge was originally derived from steam-driven pumps, which were replaced by electrically-driven pumps in 1959. These feed a hydraulic accumulator sunk into a 60 ft (18 m) shaft below the bridge; the water is then released under pressure which runs the machinery to turn the bridge. The mechanism used for this is still the same machinery originally installed by Armstrong. It has a 281 ft (86 m) cantilevered span with a central axis of rotation able to move through 360° to allow vessels to pass on either side of it.

The busiest year of operation was 1924 when the bridge was rotated 6,000 times, unlike current use where it is only required to turn occasionally to allow yachts and pleasure craft to pass by and on the first Wednesday of each month as a maintenance exercise.

Swing Bridge and Tyne Bridge with Newcastle to the left

The bridge featured in the final episode and climax of the 1988 educational series Geordie Racer from Look and Read, when the villains became stranded on the bridge after a robbery. In May 2016, a fire broke out on the pontoon under the bridge. Around 215 square feet (20 m^{2}) was affected by the blaze which was tackled by two fire crews and a fire boat. The bridge was renovated in 2018 at a cost of £200,000. The restoration involved 25,000 hours of work and 10,000 screws were used in repairs. Its reopening in August 2021 was marred by technical issues which saw the bridge unable to swing.

The Swing Bridge facing Newcastle

== See also ==
- Grade II* listed buildings in Tyne and Wear

Next bridge upstream	River Tyne	Next bridge downstream
High Level Bridge; B1307 and Durham Coast Line	Swing Bridge; Grid reference NZ251637	Tyne Bridge; A167 and National Cycle Route 725
