= Sir M MacDonald & Partners =

UK-based civil engineering consultancy

- Company type: Partnership
- Industry: Consultancy
- Founded: 1921 (as MacDonald & MacCorquodale)
- Defunct: 1989
- Fate: Merged with Mott, Hay & Anderson
- Successor: Mott MacDonald
- Headquarters: London, UK

Sir M MacDonald & Partners was a UK-based civil engineering consultancy during the 20th century, named after Sir Murdoch MacDonald, a Scottish-born civil engineer (and later a politician). Its establishment and early history was strongly associated with work in Egypt during the 1920s. In 1989, the company merged with Mott, Hay and Anderson to form Mott MacDonald, today a major international multidisciplinary consultancy.

== History ==
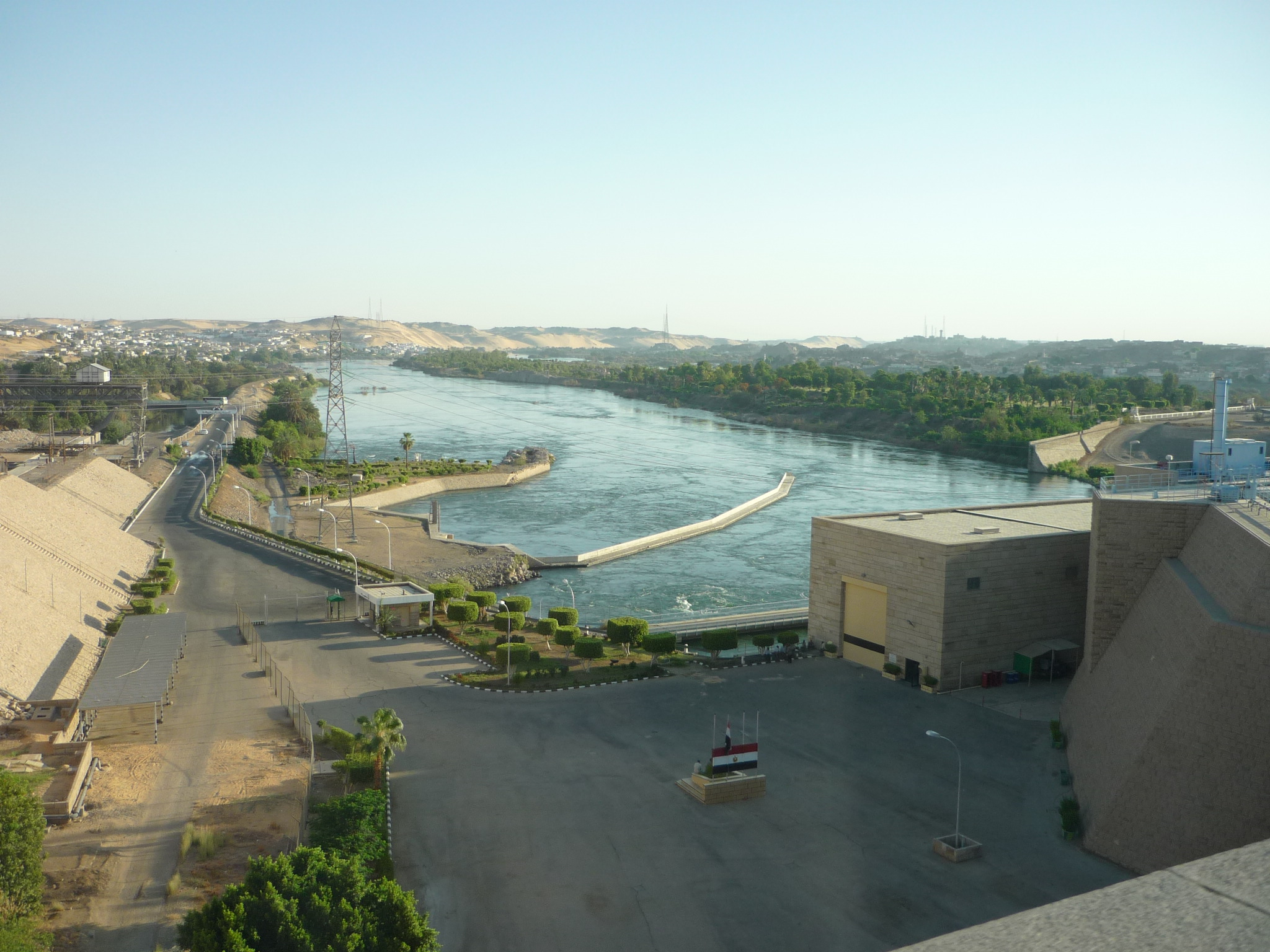
View of the Nile River from the Aswan Low Dam in Egypt.

Sir M MacDonald & Partners emerged from affairs relating directly to British infrastructure development in Egypt between 1890 and 1930, in particular MacDonald's involvement with the Aswan Low Dam, starting in 1898. MacDonald was involved in the original construction of the Dam and later became an advisor to the Egyptian Ministry of Public Works after the dam was completed in 1902. He became closely associated with the development and first heightening of the Aswan Low Dam for the provision of hydroelectricity.

MacDonald retired from service with the Egyptian government in 1921 and returned to Britain where he began a partnership with a fellow Scot, Archibald MacCorquodale, who had worked with him in Scotland and Egypt, trading in London as MacDonald & MacCorquodale, consulting engineers. In 1927, the partnership was expanded to include P H East (also an engineer in the Egyptian government from 1907 to 1926) and Oswald Longstaff Prowde (resident engineer on the Sennar Dam, designed by MacDonald, on the Blue Nile in northern Sudan), and the name of the business was changed to Sir M MacDonald & Partners.

One of the first major projects of the partnership included the second heightening of the Aswan Low Dam, which continued from 1929 through design and construction stages until 1933. In addition to dam and hydroelectric work, the company was also employed on irrigation, drainage and harbour works in England, Scotland, Spain, Portugal, Greece, Jordan, Iraq and Pakistan. Rail engineering services were also provided; Prowde's last major work was for the London Underground, removing unsightly railway bridges and viaducts across the Thames (he died in 1949).

The firm continued on projects through to its merger with Mott, Hay and Anderson in 1989. Later projects include:

- the Great Ouse flood protection scheme (1950s)
- the Ness Bridge in Inverness (1961)
- the East Java irrigation project in Indonesia (1983)
- feasibility studies for the Lesotho Highlands Water project (1986)
