= Mott baronets =

Baronetcy in the Baronetage of the United Kingdom

The Mott Baronetcy, of Ditchling in the County of Sussex, is a title in the Baronetage of the United Kingdom. It was created on 25 June 1930 for the noted engineer Basil Mott.

== Mott baronets, of Ditchling (1930) ==
- Sir Basil Mott, 1st Baronet (1859–1938)
- Sir Adrian Spear Mott, 2nd Baronet (1889–1964) a captain in the army in World War I, he qualified as a barrister and was in business as a publisher
- Sir John Harmar Mott, 3rd Baronet (1922–2015)
- Sir David Hugh Mott, 4th Baronet (born 1952)

The heir apparent is the present holder's son Matthew David Mott (born 1982).
