= Tyne cyclist and pedestrian tunnels =

Tunnel in Tyne & Wear, England

Tyne Pedestrian and Cyclist Tunnels
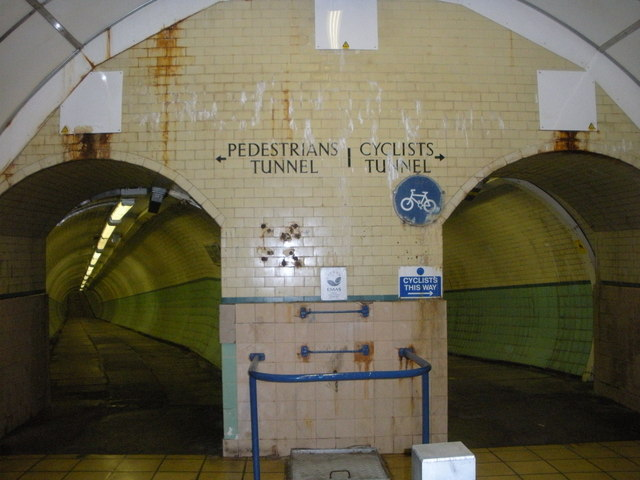
- Interactive map of Tyne Pedestrian and Cyclist Tunnels

Overview
- Route: Link between; 14; 72
- Crosses: River Tyne
- Start: Jarrow
- End: Howdon

Operation
- Opened: 1951
- Reopened: 7 August 2019
- Owner: North East Joint Transport Committee
- Operator: North East Joint Transport Committee
- Traffic: Pedestrians and cyclists
- Toll: Free

Technical
- Length: 270 m (884 ft)

The Tyne Pedestrian and Cyclist Tunnels run under the River Tyne between Howdon and Jarrow in Tyne & Wear, England. Opened in 1951, heralded as a contribution to the Festival of Britain, they were Britain's first purpose-built cycling tunnels. The original cost was £833,000 and the tunnels were used by 20,000 people a day. They consist of two tunnels running in parallel, one for pedestrian use with a 3.2 m (10 ft 6 in) diameter, and a larger 3.7 m (12 ft 2 in) diameter tunnel for pedal cyclists. Both tunnels are 270 m (884 ft) in length, and lie 12 m (40 ft) below the river bed, at their deepest point. The tunnels are over 70 years old and are Grade II listed buildings.

Each end the tunnels were originally connected to surface buildings by two escalators and a vertical lift; however, as part of the tunnels' refurbishment, on each side one escalator will be replaced with an inclined lift and the remaining escalator was made static, into a staircase. The Waygood-Otis escalators have 306 wooden steps each, and are the original models from 1951. At the time of construction, they were the highest single-rise escalators in the UK, with a vertical rise of 85 feet (26 m) and a length of 197 feet (60 m). In 1992, escalators with a higher vertical rise of 90 feet (27.4 m) and 200 feet (61 m) in length were constructed at Angel station on the London Underground. The Tyne Tunnel escalators remain the longest wooden escalators in the world.

20,000 people a month used the pedestrian tunnel in 2013.

== Refurbishment ==
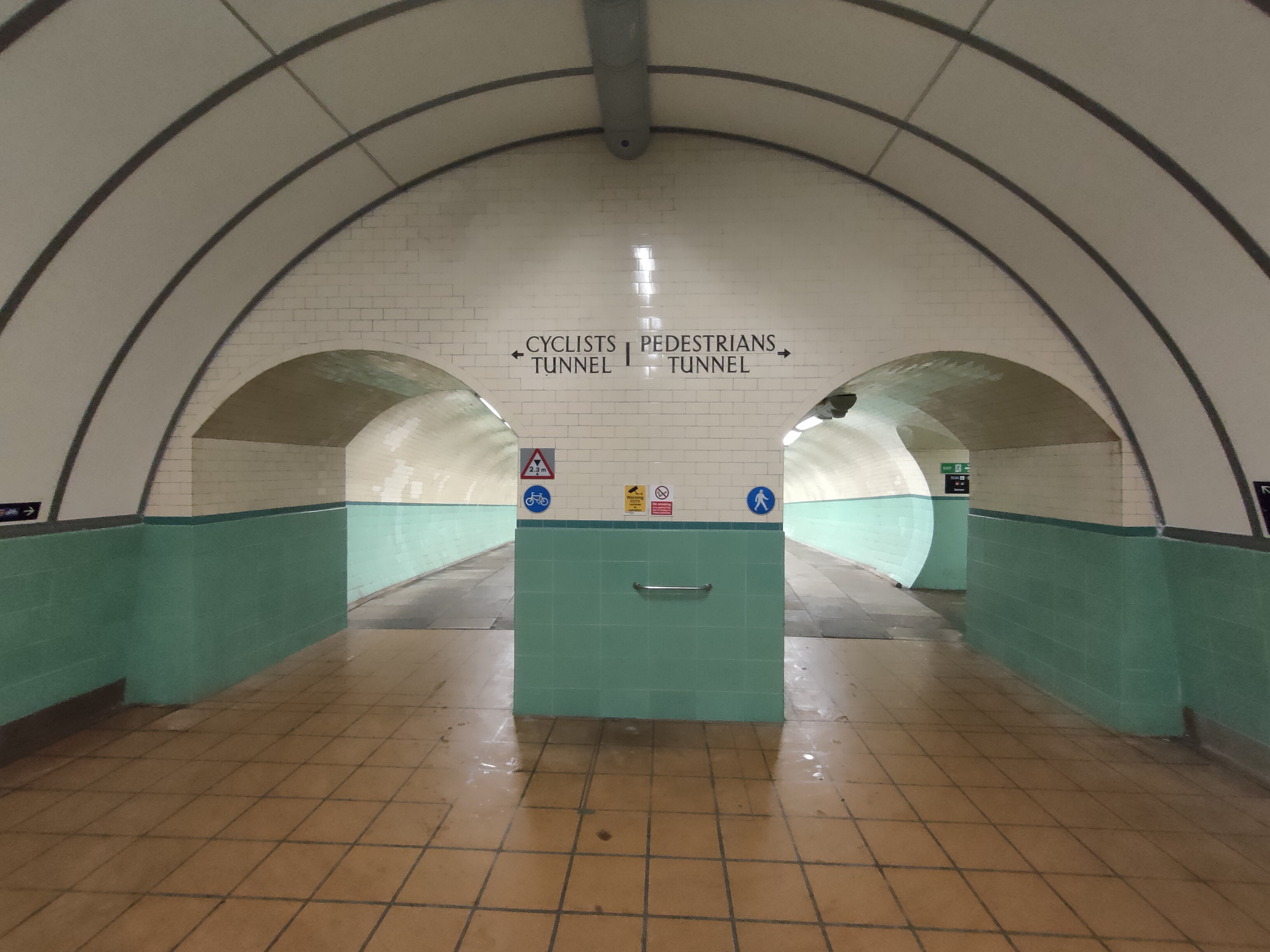
Refurbished entrances to the cyclist and pedestrian tunnels, 2023

In a refitting phase the escalators and lift shafts were due to be upgraded by October 2010 to early 2011 at a cost of £500,000. A £6,000,000 refurbishment was due to take place in 2011, but multiple delays pushed the reopening date to summer 2019.

In 2012, contractor GB Building Solutions of Balliol Business Park, Newcastle, was appointed to carry out the £4.9 million refurbishment which included the replacement of two of the original four escalators with inclined lifts and the replacement of the tunnels' ageing mechanical and electrical systems. However, GB Building Solutions went into administration in 2015, delaying the project.

The two remaining escalators, which are original and of historical significance, will be opened up to public view and illuminated with feature lighting.

New lighting, CCTV, control and communications systems were installed, in addition to carrying out repairs to the tunnel structure itself and to the historic finishes within the tunnel such as the tiling and panelling. The concrete floor sections were also refurbished or replaced. During the closure, a free, timetabled shuttle bus for pedestrians and cyclists was in operation between 6am and 8pm, seven days a week, 364 days a year.

The tunnel reopened at midday on 7 August 2019, operating initially for 14 hours a day until installation of the new inclined lifts was completed when the service would have been 24 hours. By December 2019 monthly journeys were above 20,000 with around 25% of users being cyclists. People using the tunnels can link with cycle routes at either end, namely NCN 14 and 72. The 317 bus service for Wallsend or Whitley Bay from the north end or take a short walk to the Jarrow bus and Metro station from the south end. Mobility scooters can access the tunnels and dogs on leads are allowed.

On November 25th 2024, both of the inclined lifts has been completed, and the remaining wooden escalators at each end of the tunnel are blocked off for use in emergencies only. The vertical lift at each end remains in operation.

== See also ==
- Tyne Tunnel - vehicular tunnels
