= St James' Church, Melsonby =

Coordinates: 54.4710°N 1.6911°W

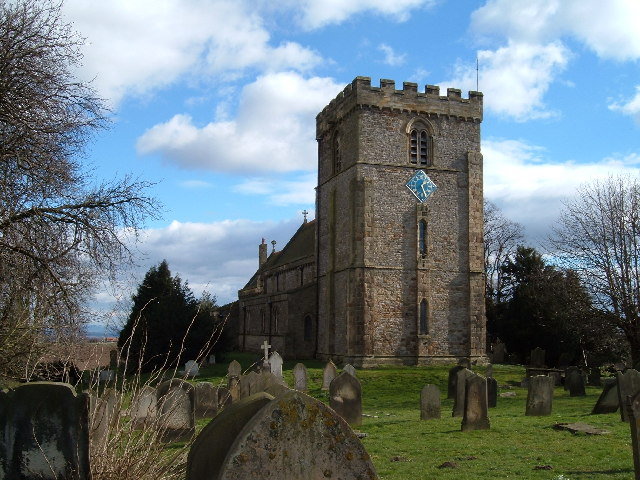
- St James' Church, Melsonby, from the northwest

- Location in North Yorkshire
- OS grid reference: NZ 201,084
- Location: Melsonby, North Yorkshire
- Country: England
- Denomination: Anglican
- Website: Stanwick Group of Churches

History
- Status: Parish church
- Dedication: Saint James the Great

Architecture
- Functional status: Active
- Heritage designation: Grade II*
- Designated: 4 February 1969
- Architect: Paley and Austin (restoration)
- Architectural type: Church
- Style: Gothic, Gothic Revival

Specifications
- Materials: Sandstone, tiled roofs

Administration
- Province: York
- Diocese: Leeds
- Archdeaconry: Richmond
- Deanery: Richmond
- Parish: Melsonby

St James' Church is in the village of Melsonby, North Yorkshire, England. It is an Anglican parish church in the deanery of Richmond, the archdeaconry of Richmond, and the Diocese of Leeds. Its benefice is united with those of four local churches to form the Stanwick Group of Churches. The church is recorded in the National Heritage List for England as a designated Grade II* listed building.

== History ==
A church was present on the site before the Norman conquest, and the presence of a priest at Melsonby is recorded in the Domesday Book. The present church dates from 1135, and it was completed by the 13th century. It was restored in 1871–72 by the Lancaster architects Paley and Austin. The restoration included rebuilding the nave and chancel, and adding the vestry and porch. The Perpendicular east window was replaced by three lancet windows.

== Architecture ==
=== Exterior ===
St James' is constructed in sandstone rubble with ashlar dressings and has a tiled roof. Its plan consists of a four-bay nave with a clerestory, north and south aisles, a south porch, a three-bay chancel, a north vestry, and a west tower. The tower is in three stages with buttresses at the corners, and in the centre of each side. There is a lancet window in either one or both stages of each central buttress. Above the central buttress on the west side is a lozenge-shaped clock face. On each side of the top stage is a louvred bell opening. The parapet is corbelled and battlemented. The south porch is gabled with buttresses, a pointed-arched doorway and two lancet windows on each side.

In the wall of the south aisle are a single lancet and two paired lancet windows; along the north aisle are three pairs of lancets. The clerestory has four round-headed windows on each side. There is a further lancet window in the west and east ends of both aisles. Along the south wall of the chancel is a pointed-arched window, a priest's door with a pointed arch, three lancet windows, and three niches for images. The east window is a triple lancet with a stepped hoodmould. On the north side of the chancel are three lancets. The vestry has a pointed-arched east window, and paired lancet on the north side. There are cross finials on the gable ends.

=== Interior ===
The arcades are supported by piers, some of which are circular, others octagonal. On the north side of the chancel is a double aumbry; on the south side is a single aumbry and a damaged piscina. In the south aisle is a recess dating from the middle of the 14th century with a crocketed canopy, a finial at the apex and pinnacles at the sides; it had possibly been an Easter Sepulchre. The monuments include a 13th-century effigy of a knight with chain mail, a sword and a shield; a grave cover carved with a foliated cross, a man's head, and hands in prayer; and two Anglo-Saxon cross shafts dating from about 800. The single manual organ was built by Bryceson and Company. There is a ring of four bells. The oldest of these was cast in about 1370, the next in 1718 by Edward Seller I, and the latest two in 1875 by John Warner & Sons.

== External features ==
In the churchyard are three items that are listed at Grade II. To the east of the porch are two sandstone tombstones dating from the early and middle parts of the 18th century. To the south of the tower is a badly worn sandstone chest tomb, dating possibly from the 17th century. On the south side of the path leading to the church is a group of three sandstone tombstones dating from the middle of the 18th century.

== See also ==
- Grade II* listed churches in North Yorkshire (district)
- Listed buildings in Melsonby
- List of ecclesiastical works by Paley and Austin
