= Maurice Fitzmaurice =

Sir Maurice Fitzmaurice
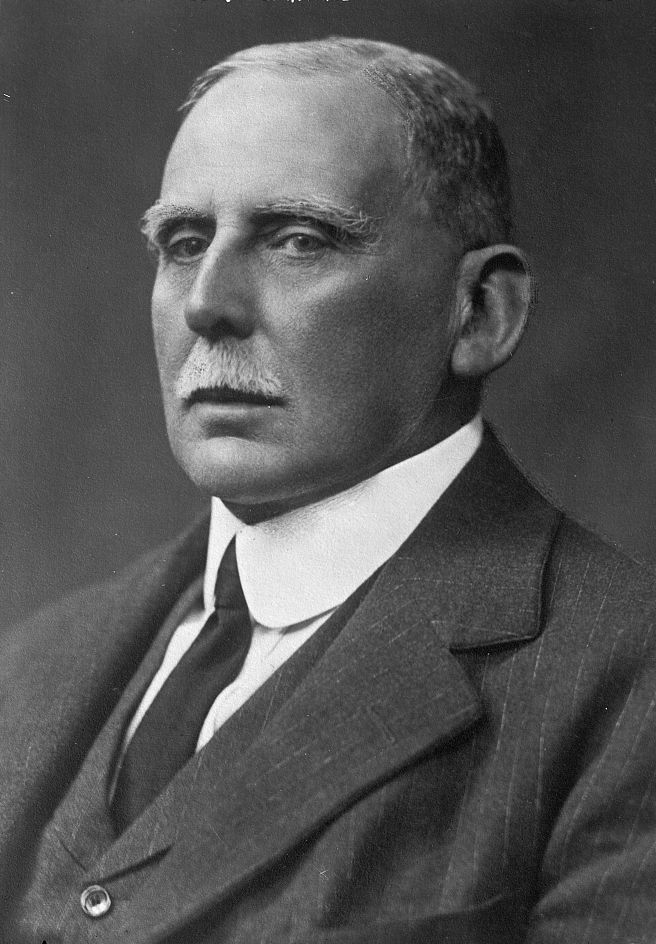
- Born: 11 May 1861; Clogher, County Kerry, Ireland
- Died: 17 November 1924 (aged 63); London, United Kingdom
- Resting place: Brookwood Cemetery
- Education: Trinity College, Dublin
- Spouse: Ida Dickinson
- Engineering career
- Discipline: Civil
- Institutions: Institution of Civil Engineers (president), American Society of Civil Engineers (hon), Royal Society (fellow), Society of Engineers (hon fellow),
- Projects: Aswan Dam, Forth Bridge, Sennar Dam,

Sir Maurice Fitzmaurice CMG (11 May 1861–17 November 1924) was an Irish civil engineer. He was apprenticed to Sir Benjamin Baker, and worked with him on the Forth Railway Bridge before going to Egypt to build the Aswan Dam, for which he was appointed both a member of the Ottoman Order of the Mejidiye and a companion of the British Order of St Michael and St George. Following this, Fitzmaurice was Chief Engineer to the London County Council and was responsible for the Blackwall, Rotherhithe and Woolwich tunnels. In later life his consultancy advised on docks and harbours across the British Empire, including the Sennar Dam in the Anglo-Egyptian Sudan . He was recognised with the prestigious honour of the presidency of the Institution of Civil Engineers for the 1916-17 session.

== Early life and apprenticeship ==
Fitzmaurice was born in Tralee, County Kerry, in the south-west of Ireland in 1861. He received an education at The Royal School, Armagh, in Ulster, prior to studying civil engineering at Trinity College, Dublin, from 1878. He graduated in 1882 and was articled (a form of apprenticeship) to Sir Benjamin Baker, where his first project was the construction of the south pier and railway approaches to the Forth Railway Bridge. This work finished in 1888 and he spent the next three years working on the aborted construction of the Chignecto Ship Railway in Canada.

== London County Council ==
Fitzmaurice left Baker in 1892 and joined London County Council as a resident engineer where his first project was the Blackwall Tunnel; he worked with David Hay and the two authored a paper on the project published by the Institution of Civil Engineers in 1897. Watt Medals and Telford Premiums were awarded to David Hay, M. Inst. C.E., and Maurice Fitzmaurice, B.E., M. Inst. C.E., for their joint Paper on " The Blackwall Tunnel."

He was then appointed chief resident engineer in 1898 by the Egyptian government for the construction of the Old Aswan Dam. In recognition of his work he was made a member of the Ottoman Order of Medjidie (second class) in December 1901, during a visit by the Khedive to the building site; and also appointed a Companion of the Order of St Michael and St George (CMG) on 12 December 1902. In 1901 he became the Chief Engineer to the London County Council and amongst his works for them was the Rotherhithe Tunnel, Vauxhall Bridge and the Woolwich foot tunnel. Upon his retirement from the Council in 1912 he received a knighthood.

== Later works ==
From 1912 he was a partner in John Coode's firm of engineers and worked extensively on docks, including designs for harbours in Australia, Burma, Ceylon, Hong Kong, Kenya, Malaya, Nigeria, Singapore and the United Kingdom. From 1922 Fitzmaurice was also an advisor to the Sudanese government on irrigation of the Blue Nile including the plans for the Sennar Dam, which was built after his death. During this time he was also a member of the Engineer and Railway Staff Corps, a voluntary Territorial Army unit providing engineering advice to the British Armed Forces, holding the rank of lieutenant-colonel. He married Ida Dickinson in 1911 and died at his home in London on 17 November 1924.

== Professional recognition ==
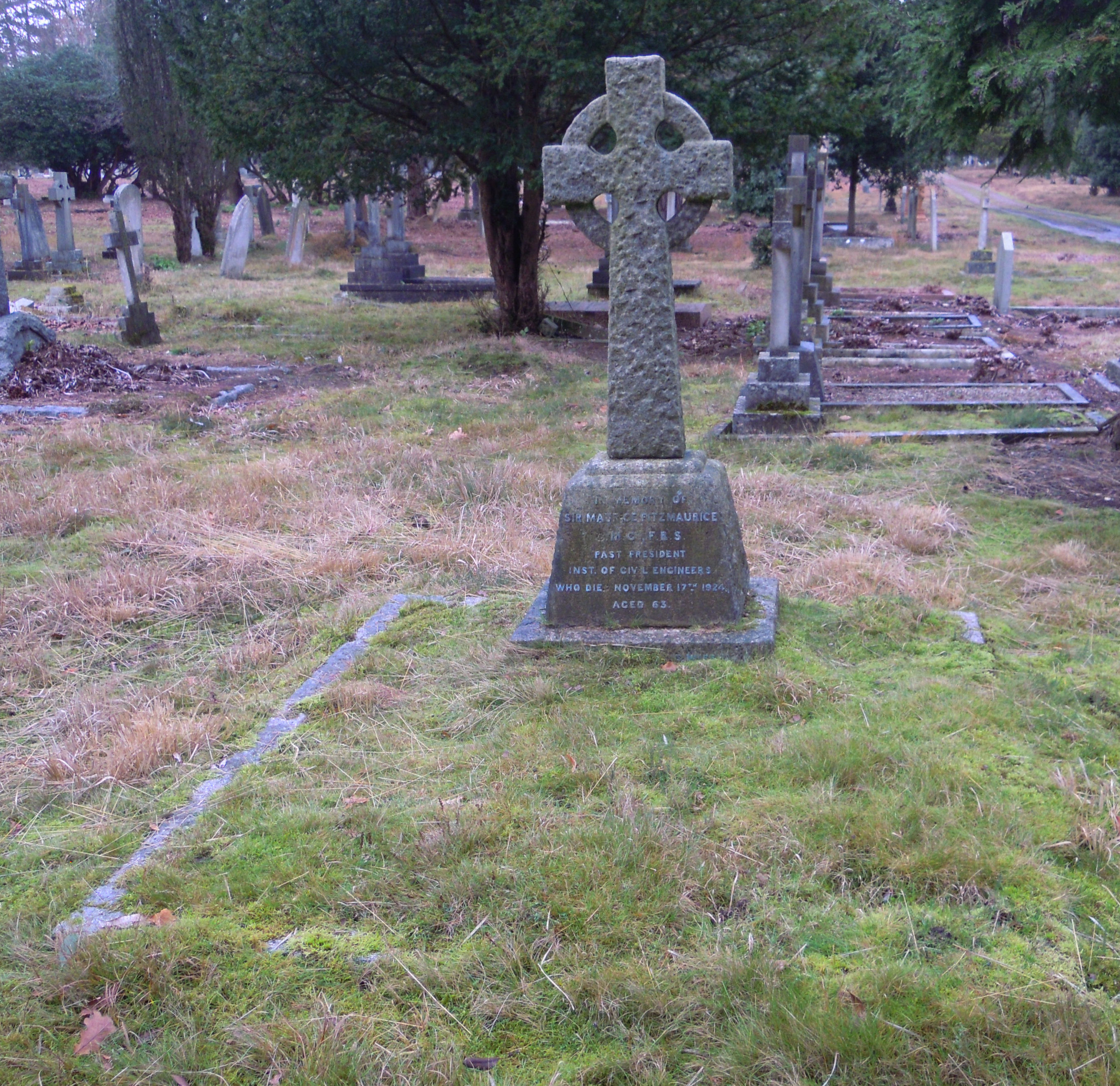
Fitzmaurice's grave in Brookwood Cemetery

Fitzmaurice first became involved with the Institution of Civil Engineers in 1883 as a student member, becoming an associate in 1887 and a full member in 1893. He served on the Institution's Council from 1905 and was elected President for the 1916-7 session. In 1919 he was elected as a fellow of the Royal Society and was an honorary member of the American Society of Civil Engineers and the Royal Engineers Institution and an honorary fellow of the Society of Engineers. He received an honorary doctorate of law from the University of Birmingham in 1909.

He is buried in Brookwood Cemetery.

Professional and academic associations
Preceded by Alexander Ross	President of the Institution of Civil Engineers; November 1916 – November 1917	Succeeded by Harry Edward Jones
