= Teesside Combined Court Centre =

Judicial building in Middlesbrough, England

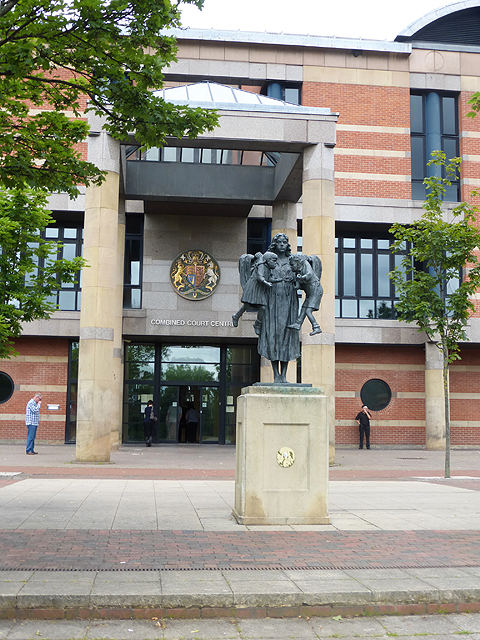
- Teesside Combined Court Centre

- Shown in North Yorkshire
- 54.5754°N 1.2312°W
- Location: Corporation Road, Middlesbrough

History
- Built: 1991

Site notes
- Architect: Napper Collerton
- Architectural style: Post-modernist style

The Teesside Combined Court Centre is a Crown Court venue, which deals with criminal cases, as well as a County Court venue, which deals with civil cases, in Corporation Road, Middlesbrough, England.

== History ==
Until the early 1970s, apart from an aging courtroom in Middlesbrough Town Hall, there were no dedicated court facilities suitable for criminal trials in the area. This was temporarily resolved when a new law courts building (now referred to as Middlesbrough Magistrates' Court) was opened in Victoria Square in 1973. However, as the number of court cases on Teesside grew, it became necessary to commission a courthouse with dedicated facilities for both Crown Court hearings, which require courtrooms suitable for trial by jury, and for County Court hearings. The site selected by the Lord Chancellor's Department had been occupied by rows of terraced houses (Elm Street, Atkinson Street and Ash Street), which were cleared away in the late 1970s for a development which Prime Minister Margaret Thatcher's government cancelled in 1979.

The new building was designed by Napper Collerton in the Post-modernist style, built by John Laing Construction in red brick with stone dressings at a cost of £15.1 million, and was completed in 1991. The design involved a symmetrical main frontage of nine bays facing onto Central Square Gardens. The central bay featured a two-storey portico formed by columns supporting a pyramid-shaped glass roof. Inside the portico there was a glass doorway on the ground floor and a Royal coat of arms at first floor level. The first and second floors were cantilevered out over the pavement and fenestrated by tall bi-partite windows split by full-height columns supporting an entablature and, in the two bays flanking the central bay, segmental pediments. Internally, the building was laid out to accommodate twelve courtrooms.

A statue sculpted by Graham Ibbeson, entitled "Scales of Justice", which depicted two small squabbling children being held by a woman, was unveiled outside the building in 1994.

Notable cases have included the trial and conviction of Robin Garbutt, in April 2011, for the murder of his wife, the Melsonby postmistress, Diane Garbutt.
