= Listed buildings in Melsonby =

Melsonby is a civil parish in the county of North Yorkshire, England. It contains 28 listed buildings that are recorded in the National Heritage List for England. Of these, one is listed at Grade II*, the middle of the three grades, and the others are at Grade II, the lowest grade. The parish contains the village of Melsonby and the surrounding countryside. Most of the listed buildings are houses, cottages and associated structures, farmhouses and farm buildings, and the others include a church, memorials in the churchyard, and a bridge.

== Key ==
Grade	Criteria
II*	Particularly important buildings of more than special interest
II	Buildings of national importance and special interest

== Buildings ==
Name and location	Photograph	Date	Notes	Grade
St James' Church; 54.47094°N 1.69123°W		12th century	The church has been altered and extended through the centuries, including a restoration in 1870–72 by Paley and Austin. It is built in sandstone with tile roofs, and consists of a nave with a clerestory, north and south aisles, a south porch, a chancel with a north vestry, and a west tower. The tower has three stages, a moulded plinth, pilaster buttresses, some with lancet windows, lozenge-shaped clock faces, and two-light bell openings, above which is a corbel table and an embattled parapet. The porch is gabled, and has an entrance with a pointed arch. The inner doorway dates from the 12th century, and has two orders, and shafts with worn volutes to the capitals.	II*
The Old Rectory; 54.47000°N 1.69165°W	—	Late 16th to early 17th century	The rectory was enlarged in 1706, and later became a private house. It is in stone with Westmorland slate roofs, half-hipped on the left. The east front has two storeys, a basement and an attic, and seven bays, a chamfered plinth, and chamfered quoins. The doorway has an architrave on bases, highly decorated pilasters, a cornice, and a broken pediment with a cross in the tympanum. The windows are sashes, some in architraves. Elsewhere, there are horizontally-sliding sashes and mullioned windows.	II
Chest tomb 54.47084°N 1.69136°W	—	17th century (probable)	The chest tomb is in the churchyard of St James' Church, to the south of the tower. It is in sandstone and has a chamfered top, with an indented circle containing a raised armorial shield. The ends of the chest are fluted but worn.	II
Hope Cottage; 54.47044°N 1.69349°W	—	Late 17th century (probable)	The house, which was later extended to the right, is in sandstone and has a tile roof. There are two storeys, the older part has two bays, and the later part, slightly higher, also has two bays. In the earlier part is a doorway with a chamfered quoined surround, an initialled lintel and a hood mould, and the windows are casements. The later part has sash windows with chamfered lintels.	II
Layton House Farmhouse; 54.47177°N 1.69802°W	—	1698	The farmhouse, which was later extended, is in stone, and has a pantile roof with artificial stone slate at the eaves, raised verges on the left and a shaped kneeler and stone coping on the right. The main part has two storeys and a T-shaped plan with outshuts in the angles, and four bays, and to the left is a later single-storey range. The main part has a plinth, quoins, and a doorway with a chamfered quoined surround, and an initialled and dated lintel, above which is a sundial. To the left is a sash window, and most of the other windows are horizontally-sliding sashes, some with mullions.	II
Fern House and Cottage; 54.47053°N 1.69447°W	—	Late 17th to early 18th century (probable)	The house and cottage are roughcast and have a pantile roof. There are two storeys and four bays. On the front, the house and cottage each has a doorway with a cornice, the house also with a fanlight, and there is a passage door. The windows are sashes.	II
Former tithe barn southwest of The Old Rectory; 54.46986°N 1.69225°W	—	Late 17th to early 18th century	The barn, later used for other purposes, is in stone, and has a pantile roof with stone slates at the eaves, and raised verges. There are two storeys and four bays. On the front are two doorways, one blocked, and slit vents, and at the rear is a blocked cart entry.	II
School House; 54.47141°N 1.69824°W	—	Early 18th century (probable)	The house is in stone, and has a tile roof with a shaped kneeler on the right and stone coping. There are two storeys and one bay. To the left is a segmental-arched opening containing a door, and to the right is a casement window in each floor.	II
Gate piers, Langdale; 54.48409°N 1.69004°W	—	Early to mid-18th century	The gate piers flanking the entrance to the drive have been moved from elsewhere. They are in sandstone, with a square plan, and panelled sides, and each has a plain base, a cornice and a ball finial.	II
Orchard House; 54.47058°N 1.69205°W	—	Early to mid-18th century	A farmhouse, later a private house, in sandstone, with quoins, two storeys and a loft, consisting of a main range and a lower service range to the right. The main part has a plinth, and a pantile roof with stone copings and shaped kneelers. The doorway is in the centre, the windows in both parts are sashes, and at the rear of the main part is a stair window with a keystone. The service range has two bays and a stone slate roof, and contains a blocked doorway with a chamfered surround.	II
Todd and Raine memorials 54.47090°N 1.69124°W	—	Early to mid-18th century	The memorials are in the churchyard of St James' Church, to the east of the porch, and consist of sandstone slabs. The Todd memorial to the south has inscriptions, and a festoon surmounted by a crescent with a patera. The Raine memorial has an inscription, a moulded top, and moulding broken in the centre to frame a ball finial on a pedestal, with two paterae.	II
38 High Row; 54.47157°N 1.69718°W	—	Mid-18th century	A cottage in stone with a tile roof, stone coping and shaped kneelers. There are two storeys and two bays. In the right bay is a house doorway and to its right is a passage doorway, both with quoined surrounds. The windows are sashes, and in the left bay, under the eaves, is a small loft opening.	II
Melonsby Farmhouse; 54.47165°N 1.69858°W	—	Mid-18th century	A farmhouse, later a private house, in sandstone, with quoins, a moulded cornice, and a pantile roof with stone slates at the eaves, shaped kneelers and stone coping. There are two storeys, three bays and a rear oushut. The central doorway has architraves with bases, a narrow fanlight, a pulvinated frieze and a pediment. The windows are sashes in architraves.	II
Gates and gate piers, The Old Rectory; 54.47014°N 1.69203°W	—	Mid-18th century	The gates are in wrought iron, and have swept and scrolled tops and square-section bars with knobs to the intermediate lower bars. The gate piers are in sandstone, and have a square plan, with bases and abaci.	II
Group of three memorials 54.47083°N 1.69135°W	—	Mid-18th century	The memorials are in the churchyard of St James' Church, to the south of the church, and consist of three slabs in sandstone. The northern one has a wave-shaped top and is carved with skull and crossbones, The middle slab also has a wavy top, and the southern slab has an irregular top, with volutes framing an armorial shield with a chevron and three castles.	II
16, 18 and 20 East Road; 54.47055°N 1.69424°W	—	Mid to late 18th century	Three cottages, later two, in stone, partly roughcast, with pantile roofs, and stone coping on the right. There are two storeys and four bays, and a single-storey projecting wing on the right. On the front are doorways, and a mix of windows, some with fixed lights, some are casements, and others are horizontally-sliding sashes.	II
46 High Row; 54.47169°N 1.69765°W	—	Mid to late 18th century	The house is pebbledashed, and has a tile roof with stone coping and a shaped kneeler on the left. There are two storeys and two bays. The doorway is in the centre, and the windows are sashes.	II
Spencer House and Cottage; 54.47110°N 1.69794°W	—	Mid to late 18th century	Two houses, later combined, a stable incorporated into the house, and a cottage in sandstone with quoins, and a pantile roof with shaped kneelers and stone copings. There are two storeys and a U-shaped plan, with a main range of six bays, and two rear ranges. The doorway has an architrave with bases, a pulvinated frieze and a cornice. The windows on the front are sashes, some with architraves. The former stable has a roof with raised verges and reversed crowstepping, and external steps.	II
19 Church Row; 54.47134°N 1.69333°W	—	1785	The house is roughcast, on a plinth, with a pantile roof and stone slates to the eaves. There are two storeys, and an L-shaped plan, with a front range of two bays, and a rear wing on the right. The central doorway has a stone surround on splayed bases and a fanlight, and on the lintel is an oval dated plaque. Above it is a small canopy, and the windows are sashes.	II
Hill Crest; 54.47142°N 1.69558°W	—	1785	The cottage is in stone on a plinth, with quoins on the left, and a pantile roof with stone slates at the eaves, and a shaped kneeler and stone coping on the right. There are two storeys, three bays. and rear lean-to rear additions. The central doorway has impost blocks, and an inscribed and dated lintel. The windows are sashes.	II
Outbuilding northwest of The Old Rectory; 54.47010°N 1.69223°W	—	1797	The outbuilding is in stone, with quoins, and pantile roofs with stone slates at the eaves, shaped kneelers and stone coping. There are two storeys and four bays, the left bay lower, and containing the date above the ground floor doors. The other bays have upper floor openings.	II
Bridge over Waterfall Beck; 54.47025°N 1.69107°W		1800	The bridge is in stone and consists of a single round arch of even voussoirs. It has spandrels, a buttress on the northeast, and a triangular coping on the parapet. On the downstream outer side is a stone inscribed with the date in Roman numerals.	II
Glebe Farmhouse; 54.47063°N 1.69097°W		1800	The house is in painted stone, and has a tile roof with stone slates at the eaves, stone coping on the left and raised verges. There are two storeys and four bays. On the front are two doorways and casement windows. To the left is an attached single-storey building with a doorway and a lintel with an oval plaque containing the date.	II
31 Church Row; 54.47119°N 1.69274°W	—	Late 18th to early 19th century	The house is in sandstone, with quoins, and a tile roof with stone coping and shaped kneelers. There are two storeys and two bays. The doorway is in the centre, the windows are casements, and all have stone surrounds.	II
4 High Row; 54.47140°N 1.69522°W	—	Late 18th to early 19th century	The house is in stone on a plinth, with quoins on the right, and a pantile roof with stone coping on the right. There are two storeys and two bays. The central doorway has a stone surround with splayed bases and a fanlight, and the windows are casements.	II
43 and 45 West Road; 54.47145°N 1.69835°W	—	Late 18th to early 19th century	A house divided into two cottages in sandstone, with quoins on the right, and a tile roof with stone coping and a shaped kneeler on the right. There are two storeys and three bays. In the centre are paired doorways, the left a stable door. In the left bay are casement windows, in the right bay are sash windows, and above the doorways is an eight-pane window.	II
Hill House; 54.47141°N 1.69542°W	—	Late 18th to early 19th century	The house is in sandstone on a plinth, with quoins, and a stone slate roof with small shaped kneelers and stone coping. There are two storeys and three bays. In the right bay is a segmental-arched carriage entrance with an insetted doorway. To the left is another doorway, and the windows are sashes.	II
Whartons Farmhouse; 54.47155°N 1.69447°W	—	Mid-19th century	The farmhouse is in sandstone, with quoins, and a stone slate roof with moulded copings. There are two storeys and an irregular plan, with a front range of three bays. In the centre is a two-storey projecting gabled porch containing a doorway with a double-chamfered surround, a basket arch and a hood mould. The windows are mullioned with hood moulds. To the rear left is a single-storey range, and a lower two-storey range to the rear right with a Welsh slate roof.	II
