= Melsonby =

Village and civil parish in North Yorkshire, England

Coordinates: 54.4708°N 1.695°W

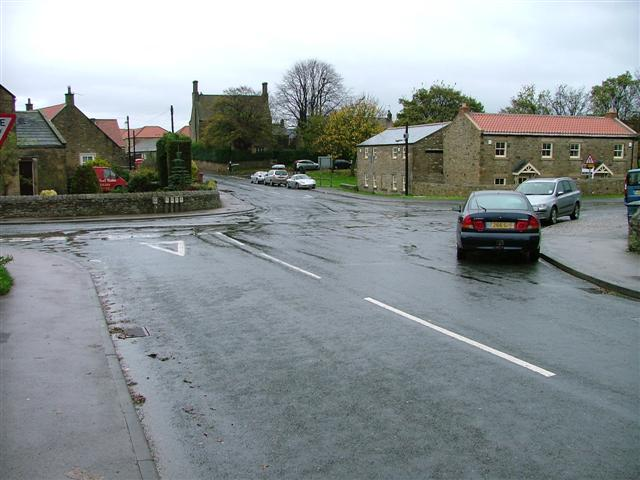
- Melsonby Village

- Location within North Yorkshire
- Population: 735 (2011 census)
- OS grid reference: NZ198084
- Unitary authority: North Yorkshire
- Ceremonial county: North Yorkshire
- Region: Yorkshire and the Humber
- Country: England
- Sovereign state: United Kingdom
- Post town: RICHMOND
- Postcode district: DL10
- Dialling code: 01325
- Police: North Yorkshire
- Fire: North Yorkshire
- Ambulance: Yorkshire
- UK Parliament: Richmond and Northallerton

Melsonby is a village and civil parish in the county of North Yorkshire, England. It lies 1.2 miles (2 km) west of the A1(M) motorway and 1.2 miles (2 km) north of the A66.

== Etymology ==
The second element in the name Melsonby is the Old Norse suffix -by, meaning "farm, settlement". The first element may be the Old Irish personal name Maelsuithan, which indicates Norse-Gaelic settlement in the area.

== Governance ==
The village lay within the Richmond (Yorks) parliamentary constituency, which has been represented since 2015 by Conservative Rishi Sunak, who took over from retiring fellow Conservative William Hague. It now lies within Richmond and Northallerton constituency.

From 1974 to 2023 it was part of the district of Richmondshire. It is now administered by the unitary North Yorkshire Council.

An electoral ward in the same name exists. This ward stretches north to Manfield with a total population taken at the 2011 Census of 1,406.

== Church ==
The parish church is St James' Church, Melsonby which is Grade II* listed.

== Melsonby Hoard ==
A hoard of hundreds of Iron Age items was found in 2021 buried in a field near the village by metal detectorist Peter Heads. The site was excavated by Durham University in 2022 with support from the British Museum and Historic England. Public announcement of the find was made in March 2025 as some of the objects were put on display at the Yorkshire Museum in York.

The hoard includes the remains of cauldrons, ceremonial spears, elaborate pony harnesses and bits. A number of iron tyres provide evidence for the use of four-wheeled wagons as well as two-wheeled chariots. Some of the items feature a mixture of Mediterranean and Iron Age decoration styles. Before their burial, many were probably deliberately damaged or burned to demonstrate the high status of their owner, though no human remains have been found.

== Murder of Diana Garbutt ==
In March 2010, village postmistress Diana Garbutt was found dead in the living quarters above the shop, after suffering severe head injuries. Her husband Robin Garbutt was charged with her murder. He was committed for trial and pleaded not guilty. On 27 September 2010 Robin Garbutt was released on bail due to a significant breakthrough in the case against him.

On 19 April 2011, following trial at Teesside Crown Court, he was convicted of the murder of Diane Garbutt and was sentenced to life imprisonment.

On 3 October 2024, the BBC reported that Robin Garbutt was making a further appeal against his conviction as the Horizon system was used in evidence against him.

== In popular culture ==
Melsonby was one of the filming locations for the 2025 film 28 Years Later.

== See also ==
- Oswald Longstaff Prowde (1882–1949), civil engineer – born in Melsonby
- Listed buildings in Melsonby
- Stanwick Hoard
