= Jubilee Bridge (Queensferry) =

Bridge in Queensferry, Wales

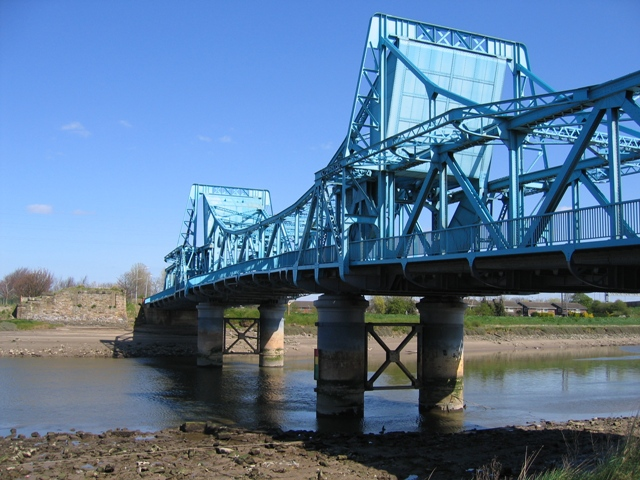
- Coordinates: 53.2108°N 3.0163°W
- Carries: Motor vehicles (2 lanes); Pedestrians
- Crosses: River Dee
- Locale: Queensferry

Characteristics
- Design: Double leaf rolling bascule bridge
- Material: Steel
- Longest span: 40.8 m (134 ft)
- No. of spans: 3
- Piers in water: 2
- Clearance above: 4.8 m (15 ft 9 in)
- Clearance below: 4 m (13 ft)

History
- Designer: Mott, Hay and Anderson
- Constructed by: Sir William Arrol & Co.
- Construction start: 1925
- Construction end: 1927
- Construction cost: £83,051

Location
- Interactive map of Jubilee Bridge

The Jubilee Bridge (also known as the Blue Bridge) is a double leaf rolling bascule bridge which spans the River Dee at Queensferry, Wales.

== History ==
Queen's Ferry Bridge Act 1924
- Act of Parliament
- Parliament of the United Kingdom
- Long title: An Act to authorise the construction of a bridge over the River Dee at Queen's Ferry and the removal of the existing bridge and for other purposes.
- Citation: 14 & 15 Geo. 5. c. viii

Dates
- Royal assent: 15 May 1924

Other legislation
- Repealed by: Clwyd County Council Act 1985

Status: Repealed

Text of statute as originally enacted

The bridge was built by Sir William Arrol & Co. between 1925 and 1927. It takes its name from an earlier bridge on the same site which was completed during the Diamond Jubilee of Queen Victoria in 1897. The abutments of the old bridge are still visible at both sides to the left (facing north) of the current bridge. The remains can be seen at low tide near the abutments.

By the 1960s shipping had ceased on the River Dee. The bridge's lifting mechanism was removed and the roadway fixed permanently in place. In 2005 the Jubilee Bridge was awarded Grade II Listed building status by Cadw.

== See also ==
- List of bridges in Wales
