= David Hay (engineer) =

British civil engineer (1859–1938)

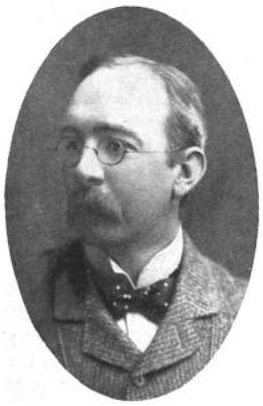
- In The Sketch, 26 May 1897
- Born: 10 April 1859; Casterton, England
- Died: 30 October 1938 (aged 79); Flimwell, England
- Occupation: Civil engineer

David Hay (10 April 1859 – 30 October 1938) was an English civil engineer of the late 19th and early 20th centuries, particularly associated with design of bridges and tunnels.

== Biography ==
Hay was born in Casterton, Westmoreland in north-west England on 10 April 1859. He worked initially as a pupil of his father and was subsequently appointed as contractor's engineer on the construction of the Great Northern and London and North Western Railway joint line from Newark to Tilton and Leicester. During 1884 and 1885 he worked on a new dock at Silloth, near Carlisle, before spending three years on widening North Eastern Railway lines in and near Newcastle-upon-Tyne.

He then became a protégé of Sir Benjamin Baker, working with him on the first Blackwall Tunnel in the 1890s, about which he wrote a paper with Maurice Fitzmaurice published by the Institution of Civil Engineers in 1897. The paper resulted in awards of Watt Medals and Telford Premiums to the authors.

With his business partner Basil Mott (in 1902, they formed a consulting engineering practice, Mott and Hay - later Mott, Hay and Anderson), Hay was involved with the design and construction of London's first deep level "tube" lines - the City and South London Railway (today part of the Northern line) and the Central London Railway (today forming the Central line between Shepherd's Bush and the City of London). Mott and Hay were internationally recognised as authorities on underground railways, being invited to write a 1905 paper for the American Society of Civil Engineers.

They were also involved with modernisation work on London bridges including Southwark Bridge and Blackfriars Bridge, the Tyne Bridge in Newcastle-upon-Tyne, and the first of the Mersey Tunnels, the Queensway Tunnel. In 1912, David Hay visited Australia to advise on a possible harbour crossing in Sydney.

He died at Flimwell Grange, near Hawkhurst, Kent, on 30 October 1938.
