= Oswald Longstaff Prowde =

English civil engineer (1882–1949)

Oswald Longstaff Prowde (1882 – 5 November 1949) was an English civil engineer, particularly associated with irrigation projects, dams and other water-related projects.

== Biography ==
Prowde was born in 1882, in Melsonby, the eldest son of Dr Edwin Longstaff Prowde, originally from Sunderland. He was educated at Pocklington School and in 1901 went to St John's College, Cambridge. He studied mechanical sciences under Sir Alfred Ewing, graduating with honours in 1904.

In 1905, Prowde travelled to Egypt to work with the Cairo-based Government Irrigation Service as Surveyor of Contracts in Gharbia. He later became involved in using water for hydroelectric power generation, taking charge of the first heightening of the Aswan Low Dam. He was also resident engineer on the Gezira irrigation scheme, which included the Sennar Dam on the Blue Nile (he was awarded the Telford Medal by the Institution of Civil Engineers in 1927 for his paper on this project). Prowde worked with Sir Murdoch MacDonald (an advisor to the country's Ministry of Public Works) on the development of the Aswan scheme and in 1927 became a partner in MacDonald's firm, Sir M MacDonald & Partners. He was engaged in the second heightening of the Aswan Dam, which continued through to 1933.

Later projects included work on land reclamation projects in Greece and Spain, the Brora hydroelectric projects in Scotland, and the River Great Ouse Flood Protection works and Whitehaven Harbour, both in England.

Prowde was made a Companion of the Order of St Michael and St George in the 1926 Birthday Honours, and also received the Egyptian Orders of Ismail, the Nile and Medjidieh.

Prowde died on 5 November 1949, in a London nursing home, and was buried in St Mary Magdalene's churchyard in Faceby, a few miles from his Yorkshire birthplace.
