= Sennar Dam =

Dam in Al Jazirah, Sudan

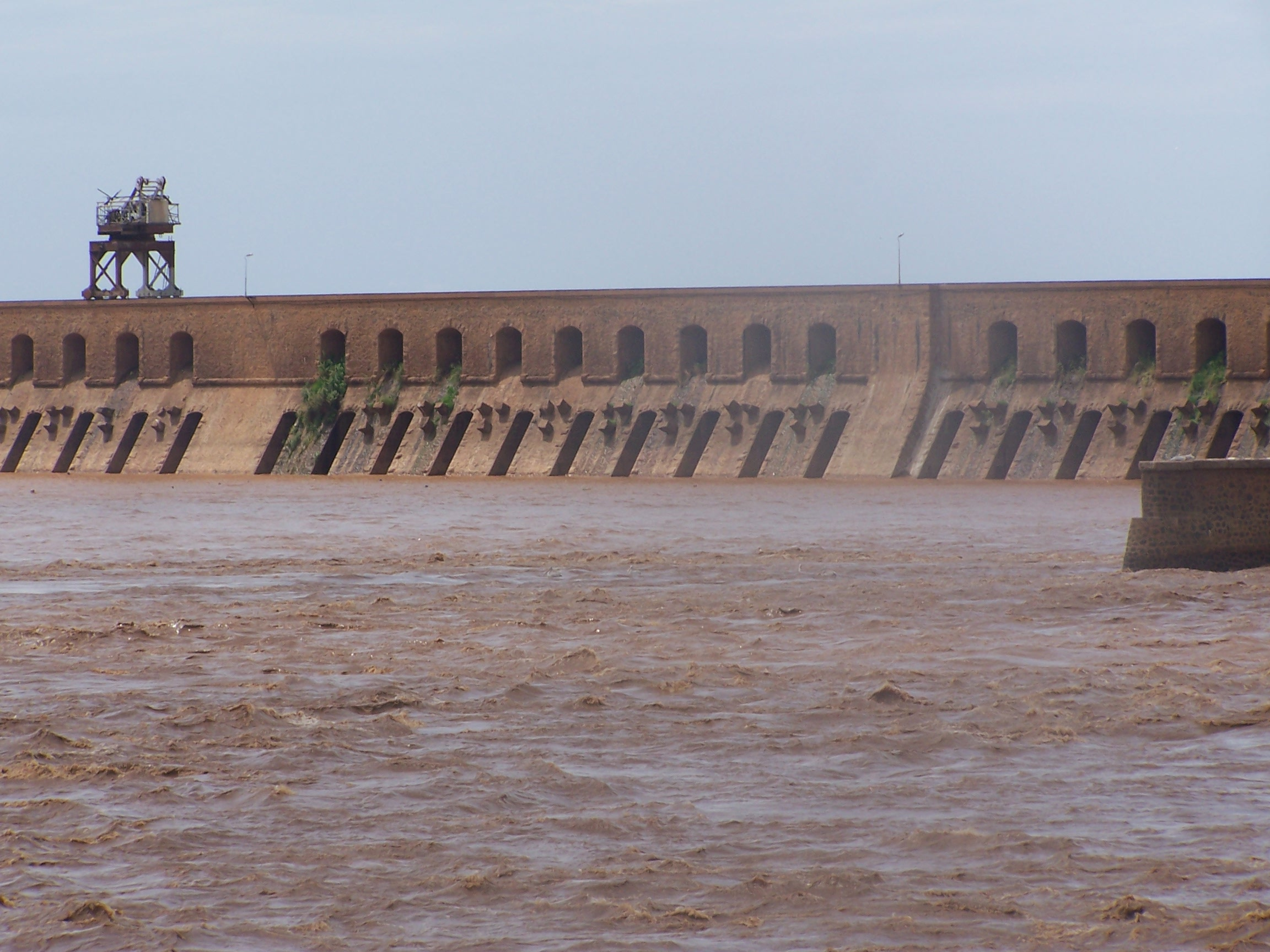
- Interactive map of Sennar Dam
- Location: Sennar, Al Jazirah, Sudan
- Coordinates: 13°32′50″N 33°38′07″E
- Opening date: 1926

Dam and spillways
- Type of dam: Gravity
- Impounds: Blue Nile
- Height: 40 metres (130 ft)
- Length: 3,025 metres (9,925 ft)

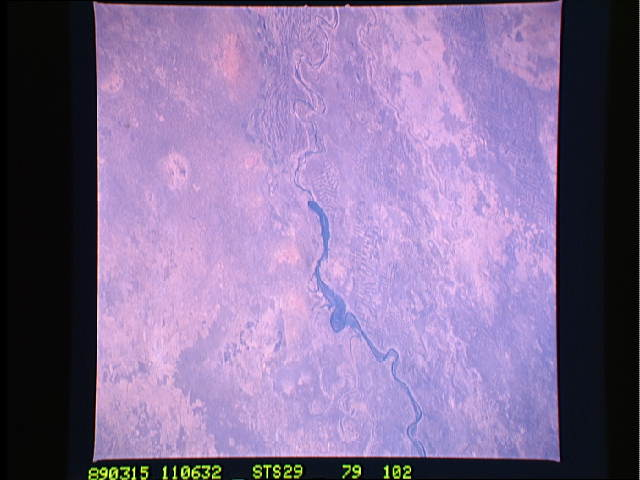
The Sennar Dam and Blue Nile, photo by crew of Discovery, STS-29, March 15, 1989

The Sennar Dam is an irrigation dam on the Blue Nile near the town of Sennar in the Al Jazirah region of Sudan. The dam is 3,025 metres (9,925 ft) long and has a maximum height of 40 metres (130 ft). It was designed by the Scottish engineer Sir Murdoch MacDonald, begun in 1914 and completed in 1925 by the British contractor S Pearson & Sons.

== Construction ==
Work on the dam started in 1914, but was almost immediately interrupted by the outbreak of World War I. Work recommenced in 1919, the contractors being the Sudan Construction Company, who carried on the work until 1921 when work was stopped for a second time as it became clear that the estimated cost of the scheme would be considerably exceeded.

In 1922, with further funds obtained, six British firms were invited to tender to complete the dam and build the connecting canal system. S Pearson and Sons was successful, and contracted to complete the dam by July 1925. Oswald Longstaff Prowde was resident engineer and John Watson Gibson was site agent. Work began in December 1922 and the dam was finished in May 1925.

The Sennar dam is one of the highlights of the state of Sennar as it was the first dam built in the country. The lake capacity is about 390 million cubic meters of water, mainly used in irrigating agricultural projects such as Blue Nile Agricultural Foundation, Al Sookie agriculture project, Al Managel agriculture project, Aljazeera agriculture project, west of Sennar sugar project, and the Al-Rahad agriculture project. Additionally, the dam enables storage for hydraulic power generation, which is estimated to have a production of about 14 MW covering more than 80% of Sennar state's consumption and covers the slight deficit of the national grid.
