= National Cycle Route 725 =

Darlington to Blyth cycle route

Great North Cycleway
- Location: North East England
- Established: 2011 (Not yet complete)
- Trailheads: Blyth (north); Darlington (south)
- Waymark: 725
Trail map

The National Cycle Route 725, also known as the Great North Cycleway, is a partially-complete regional cycling route that forms part of the National Cycle Network (NCN) in the United Kingdom.

The route is proposed to run around 70 km (43 miles) from Darlington to Blyth, in North East England. Although some parts of the route are shown on official NCN cycle maps by the network managers Sustrans, and some parts of the route have been created and signposted by the local authorities that it passes through, large sections of the route are missing or incomplete.

== History ==
The Great North Cycleway was proposed in 2011 and was initially expected to take two years to complete

The proposed Great North Cycleway is named after the Great North Road, historically the main highway between London and Scotland (until road building in the 20th Century routed motor traffic onto bypasses and motorways and away from urban areas).

In 2015, Newcastle's John Dobson Street was converted from a dual carriageway back into a single carriageway road, using the reclaimed space to create a segregated cycleway, which forms part of the Great North Cycleway.

As of 2019, large sections of the route are still unfinished.

== Route ==
Between Darlington and Newcastle, the route is largely proposed to follow close to the historic Great North Road, many parts of which are numbered here as the contemporary A167 road.
The proposed route starts in Darlington, heading North close to the A167 road and crossing over the East Coast Main Line and the River Wear as it approaches Durham. The route follows historic 1930's cycleways north out of Durham.
The route passes through the centre of Chester le Street before crossing under the A1(M) motorway at Birtley and passing the Angel of the North.
The route follows the A167 Durham Road into Gateshead before crossing the River Tyne on the Tyne Bridge.
Next the route passes through the centre of Newcastle, past the Civic Centre and through the Newcastle University campus.
Heading North out of Newcastle, the route follows close to the B1318, to the outskirts of the city, passing Great Park and Hazlerigg before heading North-East through Cramlington to Blyth.

== Related National Cycle Network routes ==
Route 725 meets the following NCN routes:

- 14 at Darlington, Durham and Gateshead
- 7 at Birtley
- 72 at Newcastle Quayside
- 10 at Hazlerigg
- 1 at Blyth

== Map ==
Map of the route using OpenStreetMap data - Great North Cycleway highlighted on Waymarked Trails

The route is shown on cycle network maps produced by Newcastle and Gateshead councils:

- Newcastle North
- Newcastle South
- Gateshead North
- Gateshead South
