= Tyne Bridge =

Bridge in North East England

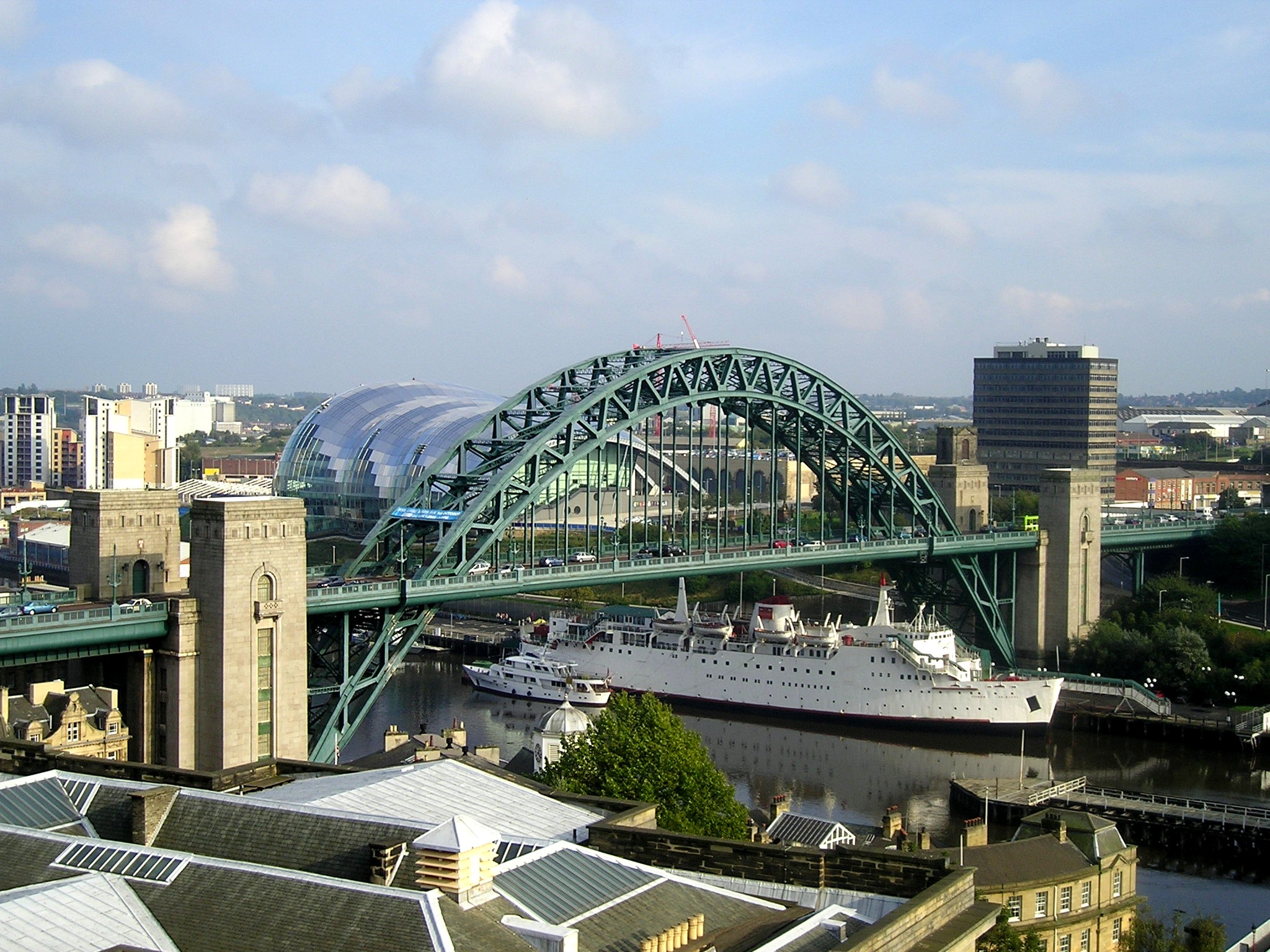
- Tyne Bridge looking towards The Glasshouse, Gateshead with the since-scrapped Tuxedo Princess moored below. The banner is advertising the 2006 Great North Run
- Coordinates: 54.9680°N 1.6060°W
- OS grid reference: NZ253637
- Carries: A167; National Cycle Route 725
- Crosses: River Tyne
- Locale: Tyneside
- Other name: New Tyne Bridge
- Owner: Newcastle City Council; Gateshead Council
- Maintained by: Newcastle–Gateshead Bridges Joint Committee
- Preceded by: Swing Bridge
- Followed by: Gateshead Millennium Bridge

Characteristics
- Design: Through arch bridge
- Material: Steel
- Pier construction: Cornish granite
- Total length: 389 m (1,276 ft)
- Width: 17 m (56 ft)
- Longest span: 161.8 m (531 ft)
- Clearance below: 26 m (85 ft)
- No. of lanes: 4

History
- Designer: Mott, Hay and Anderson
- Constructed by: Dorman Long and Co.
- Construction start: August 1925
- Construction end: 25 February 1928
- Opened: 10 October 1928; 98 years ago
- Inaugurated: 10 October 1928 by King George V

Statistics
- Daily traffic: approx. 70,000 vehicles

National Heritage List for England
- Type: Grade II* listed building
- Designated: 13 January 1983
- Reference no.: 1248569

Location
- Interactive map of Tyne Bridge

The Tyne Bridge is a through arch bridge over the River Tyne in North East England, linking Newcastle upon Tyne and Gateshead. The bridge was designed by the engineering firm Mott, Hay and Anderson, who later designed the Forth Road Bridge, and was built by Dorman Long and Co. of Middlesbrough. The bridge was officially opened on 10 October 1928 by King George V and has since become a defining symbol of Tyneside. It is ranked as the fourteenth tallest structure in Newcastle.

== History of construction ==
=== Earlier bridges ===
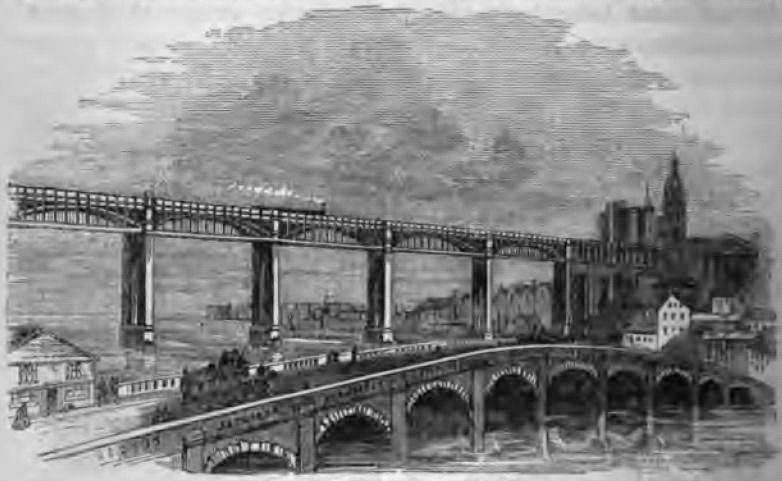
The 1781 stone bridge, with the High Level Bridge in the background, from an 1861 illustration

The earliest bridge across the Tyne, Pons Aelius, was built by the Romans on the site of the present Swing Bridge around 122.

A series of wooden bridges were lost to fire or flood, and plans for a stone bridge were begun in about 1250 with support from local landowners, and the Bishops of Durham, York and Caithness. The stone bridge was constructed but then damaged by flood in 1339. Repairs proved costly and took place in sections: it was not fully repaired, as a part stone and part wooden bridge, until the 16th century and was part destroyed by a great flood in November 1771.

Following this, a new stone bridge was begun after the city council petitioned Parliament. The foundation stone on the north side was laid by Sir Matthew White Ridley on 25 April 1775, with the south side foundation stone laid in 1776. Works were completed by 13 September 1779, at an estimated cost of between £30,000 and £60,000.

This bridge was demolished in 1868 and replaced by the current Swing Bridge to enable larger ships to move upstream to William Armstrong's works. It first used for road traffic on 15 June 1876 and opened for river traffic on 17 July 1876.

The High Level Bridge next to the Swing Bridge was primarily constructed as a railway crossing, but also featured a road deck which was opened in 1850. However, the railway companies charged tolls on use of the road crossing, a practice which continued until May 1937.

The idea of a high level road bridge to carry traffic across the River Tyne without having to descend to river level had been discussed as early as 1860, and by 1920, with a significant increase of road traffic, the Swing Bridge had become seriously congested with a bottleneck created every time it closed for shipping using the river. The Swing Bridge's busiest year of operation was 1924 when it was rotated 6,000 times. With traffic predicted to increase, it was clear a new crossing was required.

=== Construction ===
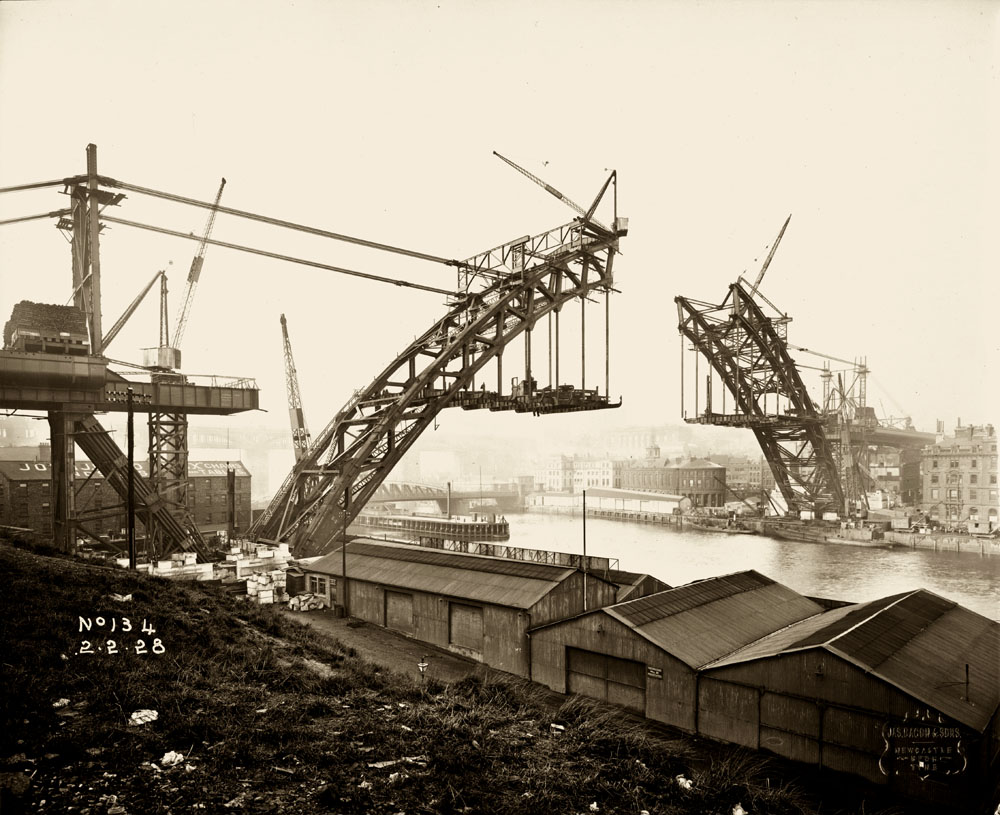
The bridge under construction.

Local civil engineer T M Webster's 1921 proposal for a high level bridge to align with the Great North Road was agreed by the Newcastle and Gateshead Corporations in 1924 with a substantial Government subsidy to alleviate unemployment on Tyneside.

The Tyne Improvement Commissioners required the bridge to have no river piers and full navigational clearance during and after its construction with no obstructions in the river bed, necessitating the single-span bridge design featuring a parabolic arch. The Bridge was designed by Mott, Hay and Anderson, comparable to their Sydney Harbour Bridge version. These bridges derived their design from the Hell Gate Bridge in New York City.

Work started on the "New Tyne Bridge" in August 1925, with Dorman Long acting as the building contractors. Cantilevering was undertaken progressively from each side of the river using cables, cradles and cranes to build the parabolic arch, which would then suspend the road deck underneath. The Dorman Long team included Dorothy Buchanan, the first female member of the Institution of Civil Engineers, joining in 1927; she also served as part of the team for the Sydney Harbour Bridge and the Lambeth Bridge in London.

The Tyne Bridge's towers were built of Cornish granite and were designed by local architect Robert Burns Dick as warehouses with five storeys. The inner floors of the warehouses in the bridge's towers were not completed and, as a result, the storage areas were never used. A lift for passengers and goods was built in the North tower to provide access to the Quayside; it is no longer in use. Although a lift shaft was also included in the South tower no lift was ever installed.

The bridge was painted green with special paint made by J. Dampney, Tonbridge, Tingate Co. of Gateshead. The same colours were used to paint the bridge in 2000.

Three men lost their lives in the bridge's construction; Frank McCoy from Gateshead, Nathaniel Collins from South Shields and Norman Muller from Sunderland.

The bridge was completed on 25 February 1928, and officially opened on 10 October that year by King George V and Queen Mary, who were the first to use the roadway, travelling in their Ascot Landau. The opening ceremony was attended by 20,000 schoolchildren who had been given the day off. Movietone News recorded the speech given by the King.

== Technical information ==
Total length	1,276 feet (389 m)
Length of arch span	531 feet (161.8 m)
Rise of arch	180 feet (55 m)
Clearance	85 feet (26 m)
Height	194 feet (59 m)
Width	56.0 feet (17.08 m)
Structural Steel	7,010 long tons (7,122 t)
Total number of rivets	777,124

== History ==
In 2012, the largest Olympic rings in the UK were erected on the bridge. The rings were manufactured by commercial signage specialists Signmaster ED Ltd of Kelso. The rings were over 25 by 12 metres (82 by 39 ft) and weighed in excess of four tonnes. This was in preparation for Newcastle hosting the Olympic football tournament, and the Olympic torch relay, in which Bear Grylls zipwired from the top of the arch, to Gateshead quayside.

External videos
- Ian Nairn films the Tyne Bridge, 1970.

On 28 June 2012, a large lightning bolt struck the Tyne Bridge. It lit up the roads as the sky was very dark. The bolt, part of a super-cell thunderstorm, came with heavy rain – a month's worth of rainfall in just two hours – causing flash flooding on Tyneside.

In 2015, Newcastle upon Tyne was a host city for the Rugby World Cup. Three matches were played at St James's Park, the home of Newcastle United Football Club. In recognition, a large illuminated sign was erected on Tyne Bridge. Similarly, the bridge was depicted in an official BBC trailer for the 2021 Rugby League World Cup (in reference to Newcastle being one of the host cities).

On 13 November 2017, the Tyne Bridge was the venue for the Freedom on the Tyne finale, the finale of the 2017 Freedom City festival. The festival commemorated Newcastle's civil rights history and the 50 years since Dr Martin Luther King's visit to Newcastle, where King received his honorary degree from Newcastle University.

Newcastle University and Freedom City 2017 wanted to use the Tyne Bridge to symbolically hark back in history to Edmund Pettus Bridge in Selma, Alabama where King was involved in one of the key moments for the struggle for civil rights in 1965. 24 roads around the Tyne Bridge were closed for the day long event. The Freedom of the Tyne event featured the many civil right stories from history. The final event, revolved around the Jarrow Crusade which was described as a memorable closing to the finale.

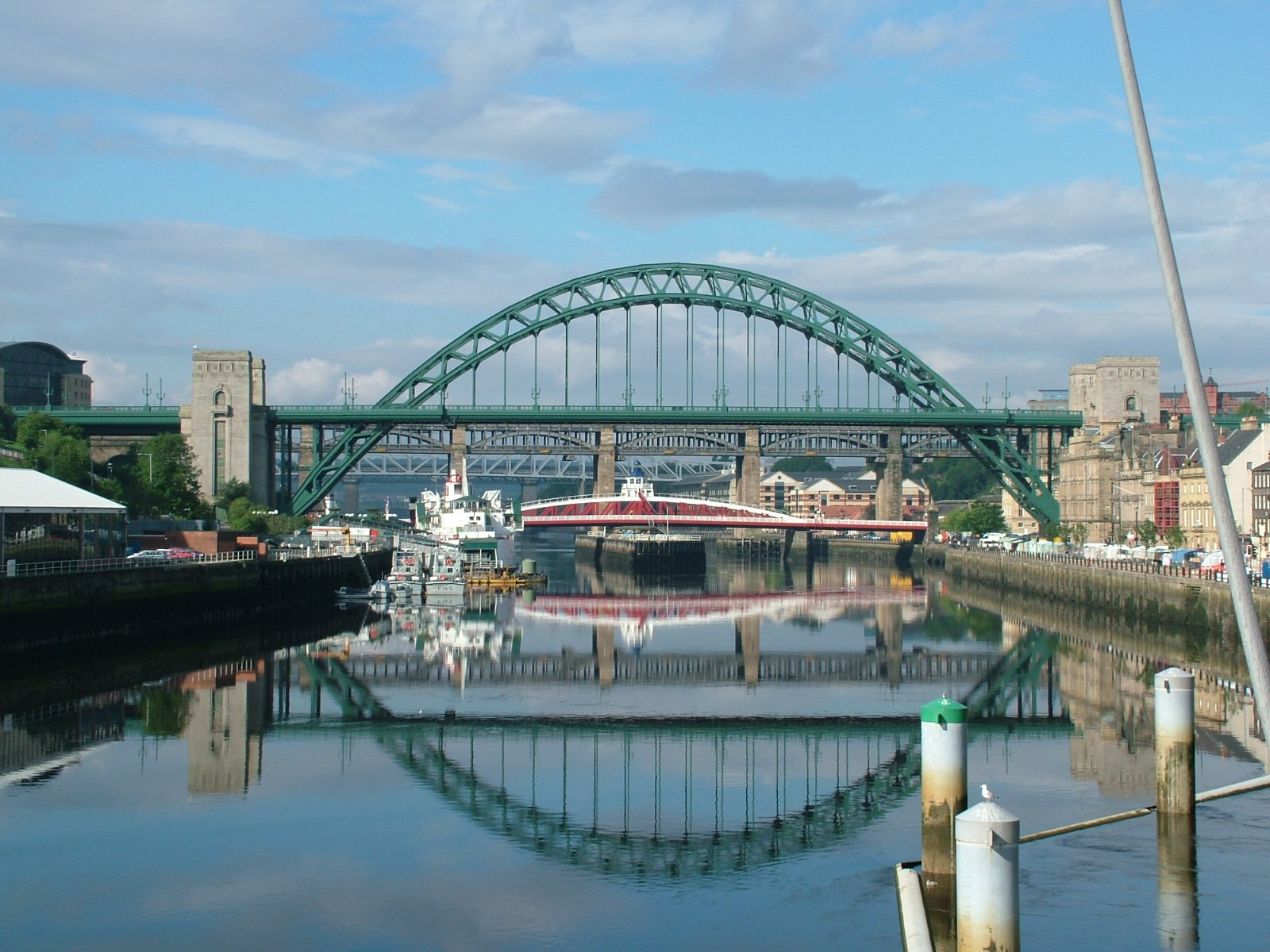
The Tyne Bridge, in green, seen from the Gateshead Millennium Bridge

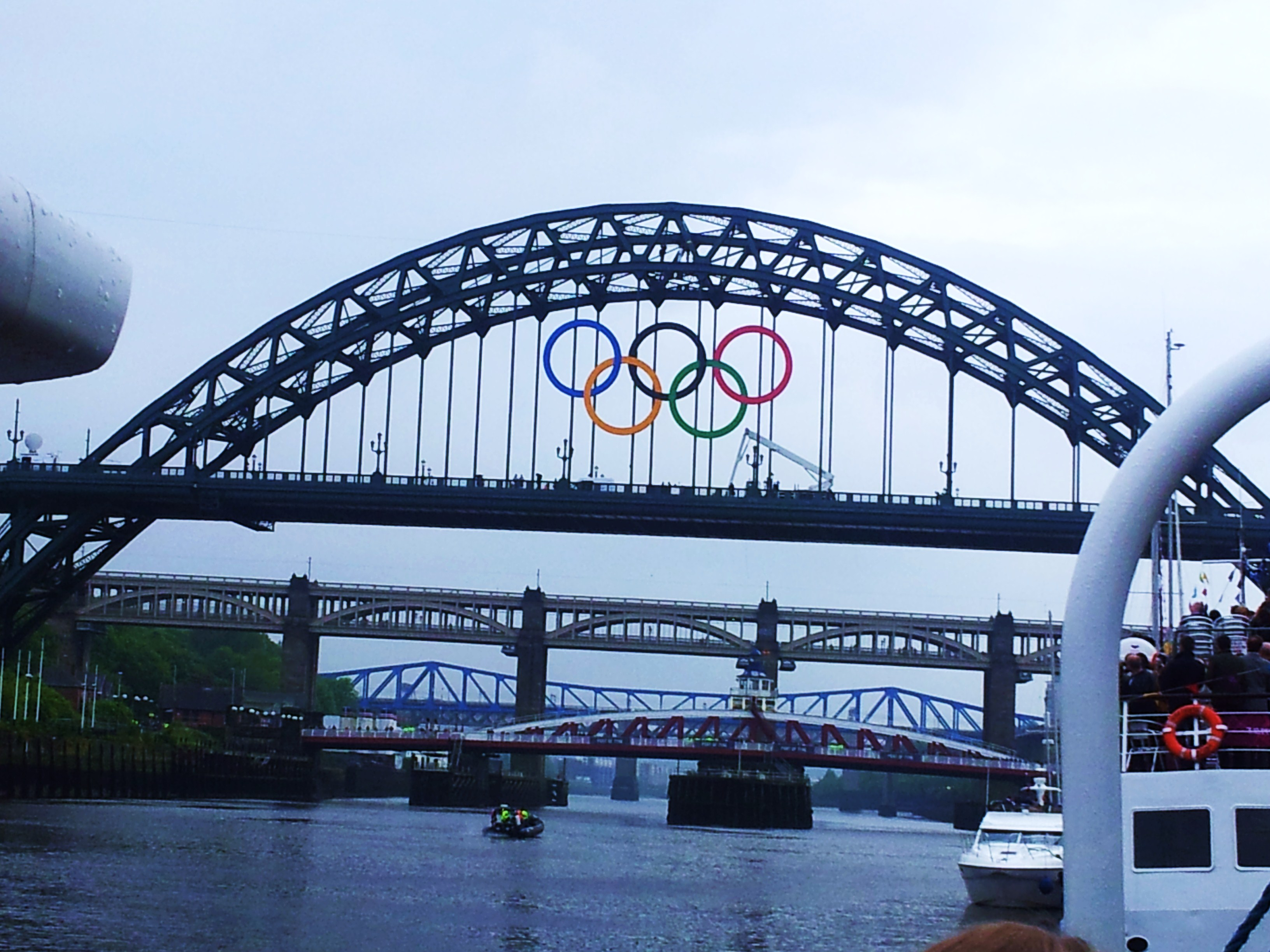
The Olympic rings on the bridge

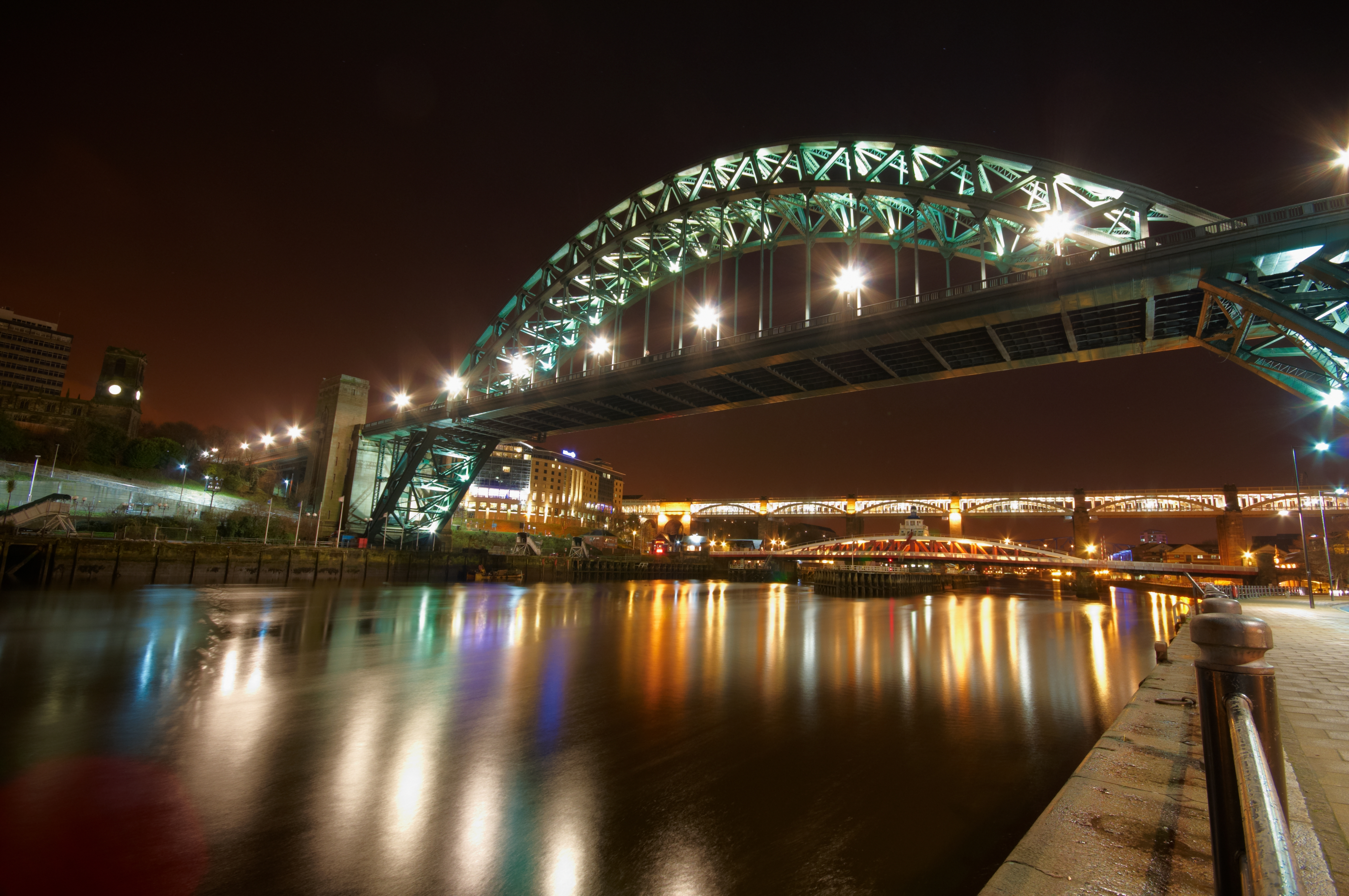
A night view of the Tyne Bridge taken from the northern embankment, looking west

=== Maintenance ===
The bridge had a major refurbishment in 2001.

In June 2022, the Department for Transport and the local government funded the cycled refurbishment of the bridge. The costs increased from £12 million to £32 million during the negotiation period. On 11 September 2023, work began, and estimations calculated the work would take four years. The agreement involved a full repaint of the rusted steelwork. The local governments from Newcastle and Gateshead also contracted work for critical structural repairs, including steel and concrete fixes, bridge joint replacements, drainage improvements, waterproofing and resurfacing, and parapet protection. Work on the main bridge deck started in April 2024, with completion expected in time for the bridge's centenary in 2028.

== Grade II* listed by Historic England ==
On 23 August 2018, the bridge was Grade II* listed by Historic England. The rating means the bridge is a particular important structure of more than special interest. The bridge was upgraded by the Department for Digital, Culture, Media and Sport on the advice of Historic England.

The bridge was upgraded to Grade II* for architectural and historical interest, as outlined here:

Architectural interest: A striking steel arch design, at its construction, notable as the largest single-span steel arch bridge on the British Isles; It is a similar prototype design as to that prepared for Sydney Harbour, Australia; the main arch was designed by the eminent civil engineer (Sir) Ralph Freeman; the prototype of a method of construction involving progressive cantilevering, using cables, cradles and cranes, which was also developed for Sydney Harbour, but first tested in Newcastle; its neoclassical and Art Deco towers that are well-detailed and defined; a potent symbol of the character and industrial pride of Tyneside; recognised worldwide for its dramatic design.

Historic interest: it is associated with some of the most distinguished 20th-century civil engineers. One of its engineers being Sir Ralph Freeman, the architect of some of the most impressive bridges in the world. Freeman was a founder of Freeman Fox & Partners, renowned bridge designers worldwide.

== Kittiwake colony ==
The bridge and nearby structures are used as a nesting site by a colony of around 700 pairs of black-legged kittiwakes, the furthest inland in the world. The colony featured in the BBC's Springwatch programme in 2010. Several groups, including the Natural History Society of Northumbria and local Wildlife Trusts, formed a "Tyne Kittiwake Partnership" to safeguard the colony. A proposal for a tower to be built as an alternative nesting site was made in 2011, and in November 2015 a neighbouring hotel submitted a planning application for measures to discourage the birds.

Next crossing upstream	River Tyne	Next crossing downstream
Swing Bridge	Tyne Bridge; Grid reference NZ2529763814	Gateshead Millennium Bridge; Footbridge
