= Quayside 5K & 10K =

5K & 10K road running event hosted in Newcastle (on the quayside)

- Date: Biannual (April & August)
- Location: Gateshead Quayside, England
- Event type: Road running
- World Athletics Cat.: World Athletics certified course
- Distance: 5K, 10K
- Established: 2014
- Organizer: RunThrough
- Website: https://www.quaysiderun.com/

The Quayside 5K & 10K, also known as the Quayside Run, is a biannual road running event held in Newcastle–Gateshead Quayside, England. The event has featured a 5K race since its establishment in 2014, with a 10K distance introduced in 2025.

The course follows an out-and-back route along the north bank of the River Tyne in Newcastle upon Tyne. It begins close to the Tyne Bridge, heads west along the river before looping back to finish near the starting area. The 10K course covers the same route twice.

Alongside the senior races, the programme includes a Junior Quayside 3K for under-13, under-15 and under-17 categories, and a 1K event for under-11s.

The Quayside Run is organised by RunThrough in partnership with Gateshead Harriers & Athletics Club. In 2024, Quayside 5K gained official recognition from World Athletics, marking its inclusion among certified international road races. Chronicle Live has described it as "one of the region's most competitive and scenic 5K races".

== Course ==
The race takes place on a flat, out-and-back course on the north side of the River Tyne in Newcastle upon Tyne. The route begins just east of the Tyne Bridge, follows the B1600 and Skinnerburn Road westwards, and turns left onto Monarch Road before looping back. Runners then return east along National Cycle Route 72, passing beneath the Redheugh, King Edward VII, Queen Elizabeth II, High Level, Swing and Tyne bridges before finishing near the start point. The 10K event follows the same course twice.

== Past winners ==
=== 5K (2014–Present) ===
Edition	Year	Men's winner	Time (h:m:s)	Women's winner	Time (h:m:s)
1st	2014	Ian Hudspith	00:15:05	Heather Sellars	00:16:58
2nd	2016	Matty Hynes	00:14:45	Tracy Millmore	00:17:36
3rd	2017	Lewis Moses	00:14:49	Lydia Turner	00:16:59
4th	2018	Lewis Moses	00:14:34	Danielle Hodgkinson	00:16:42
5th	2019	Calum Johnson	00:14:34	Calli Thackery	00:16:34
6th	2021	Calum Johnson	00:14:10	Danielle Hodgkinson	00:16:21
7th	2022	Calum Johnson	00:14:12	Georgia Malir	00:17:11
8th	2023	Scott Beattie	00:13:46	Heather Townsend	00:16:22
9th	2024 (April)	Linton Taylor	00:14:20	Stacey Smith	00:16:07
10th	2024 (August)	Scott Beattie	00:13:48	Lily Partridge	00:15:42
11th	2025 (April)	Calum Johnson	00:14:06	Sophie Pikett	00:16:22
12th	2025 (August)	Ben Connor	00:13:43	Brogan Wallace	00:15:59

=== 10K (2025–Present) ===
Edition	Year	Men's Winner	Time (h:m:s)	Women's winner	Time (h:m:s)
1st	2025 (August)	Connor Marshall	00:31:48	Caitlin Murdock	00:39:46

==== Notes ====
- Times shown are official gun times.

== Course records ==
=== Men 5K ===
Year	Athlete	Time (h:m:s)
2025 (August)	Ben Connor	00:13:43

=== Women 5K ===
Year	Athlete	Time (h:m:s)
2023	Lily Partridge	00:15:42

=== Men 10K ===
Year	Athlete	Time (h:m:s)
2025 (August)	Connor Marshall	00:31:48

=== Women 10K ===
Year	Athlete	Time (h:m:s)
2025 (August)	Caitlin Murdock	00:39:46

== See also ==
- Road running
- World Athletics
- Athletics in the United Kingdom
- Newcastle upon Tyne
- River Tyne
