= Brandling Junction Railway =

Former railway in England

The Brandling Junction Railway was an early railway in County Durham, England. It took over the Tanfield Waggonway of 1725 that was built to bring coal from Tanfield to staiths on the River Tyne at Dunston. The Brandling Junction Railway itself opened in stages from 1839, running from Gateshead to Wearmouth and South Shields. Wearmouth was regarded at the time as the "Sunderland" terminal.

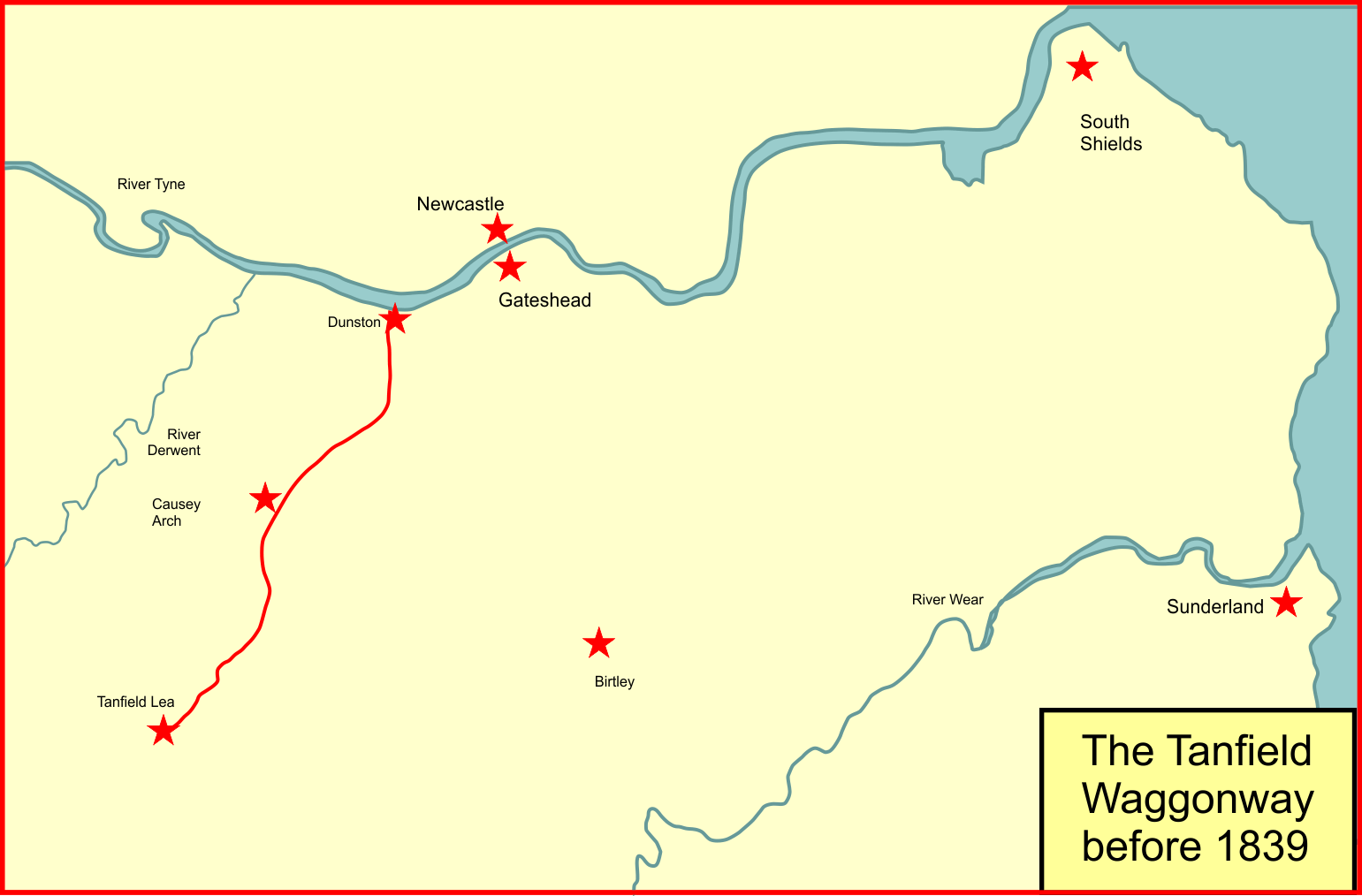
Route of the Tanfield Waggonway

The Tanfield Waggonway was modernised and connected to the Newcastle and Carlisle Railway near Redheugh, and onward transit to the main line of the Brandling Junction Railway was by a rope-worked incline from Redheugh to a Gateshead station. The Brandling Junction Railway modernised the Tanfield Waggonway route, although it remained a difficult route, with numerous rope-worked inclines.

The Brandling Junction Railway was conceived as a mainly mineral railway, but passenger traffic was surprisingly buoyant. From 1841 until 1850 main line passenger trains from London to Gateshead ran over part of the line (from Brockley Whins) and after that date from Pelaw to Gateshead, until 1868.

Most of the network closed in the middle years of the twentieth century, although the route from Gateshead to Monkwearmouth is still in use; a heritage railway operates on a section of the former Tanfield Waggonway.

== The Tanfield Waggonway ==
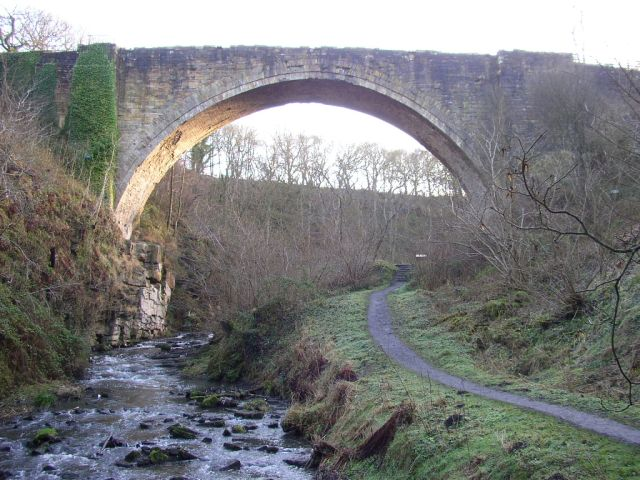
The Causey Arch in 2006

In the 17th century coal was being mined in the ground south of the River Tyne, south west of Gateshead. Transport of the mineral to market generally involved getting it overland to a waterway. The overland portion of the journey, by pack horse or cart, was slow and expensive. As the easy seams were worked out, the site of mining moved south, further from the Tyne, and the land transport problem worsened. About 1671 a waggonway was built to Dunston from the Ravensworth estate, a few miles south of Dunston. (Note: The date 1632 is often given by authors, but Lewis explains (page 93) that this is confusion with the operation of road wains, and, later, another waggonway.) The Dunston waggonway later fell into disuse.

The Tanfield Waggonway originated in a waggonway laid across Tanfield Moor, about seven miles south west of Gateshead. It was opened in 1712 by Sir John Clavering and Thomas Brumell from collieries they owned at Lintz and Buck's Nook, and George Pitt of Strathfieldsaye was encouraged to develop what became the great Tanfield coalfield, using the waggonway.

At this period there were few public roads in the area and coal owners requiring to get their product to a waterway had to arrange a wayleave with owners of intermediate land. This was an agreement to pay a fee, usually per unit of mineral transported. The further the coalpit was from the waterway, the more had to be paid to secure wayleaves. Tomlinson records that the landowners made "themselves masters of the wayleaves and great part of the collieries, and thereby got near £3,000 per annum for one colliery (three-fifths more than ever the owners received to their own use)."

Construction of the waggonway led to a legal dispute: Clavering had contracts for wayleaves for conveying coal to the Tyne by "carts or wains, and did not include waggons" (that is, waggonway vehicles). This made the waggonway unusable, and frustration among coal owners generally led to the formation of a powerful group known informally as the Grand Allies: Hon. Sidney Wortley Montagu, his son, the Hon. Edward Wortley Montagu, and Thomas Ord, of Newcastle upon Tyne; Sir Henry Liddell and Colonel George Liddell of Ravensworth Castle; and George Bowes, of Gibside.

These men began to construct "at the expense of many thousand pounds the longest and most remarkable waggonway which had so far been laid down. Besides some large cuttings, the works comprised a huge embankment across the valley of the Berkley Burn, which rendered necessary the making of a drift through the solid rock for the course of the diverted stream, and the building of a stone bridge of a single arch 102 feet in span over the stream higher up, famous as the Causey Bridge or Tanfield Arch..." It was also known as Dawson's Bridge.

Lewis explains (page 158) that the original route may have followed the west bank: "A substantial and long-disused waggonway is traceable from the west end of Causey Arch along the west bank to Tanfield pits, which is quite possibly the original Tanfield line of 1725. If this is so, Causey Arch was built to carry a main line, not a branch."

The line had a 1 in 40 ruling gradient, and there were several inclined planes on it. Lobley Hill self-acting incline south of Dunston was 50 chains long at 1 in 16 to 1 in 18. The Fugar (or Sunnyside) incline, also self-acting, was one mile four chains in length at a maximum of 1 in 11. At Tanfield Moor the incline was up to 1 in 9. There were three inclines worked by stationary engines: at Bowes Bridge at 1 in 40 northwards and Causey East Bank southwards at 1 in 57, worked by the same engine; There was also a more moderate Causey West Bank running northward from Tanfield East. Horse worked the intermediate sections.

== The Causey Bridge ==
The "Old Way" of the Tanfield Waggonway was north of Bryan's Leap, but it was extended southwards, forming the majority of the later network, in 1725 - 1727. It crossed the Beckley Burn near Causey by the Causey Arch, to reach Dawson's Drift colliery; this is often referred to as the world's oldest railway bridge.

Sykes described the bridge in 1833:

Tanfield Arch, in the county of Durham, a remarkable structure, was built by Colonel Liddell and the Hon. Charles Montague, the founders of the partnership now vulgarly called the Grand Allies, to obtain a level for the passage of coal-waggons. It is frequently called Cawsey Bridge, from its being built over the deep and romantic dell of Cawsey burn, near Tanfield. The span of the arch is 103 feet; it springs from abutments about nine feet high, and being semicircular, the entire elevation is above 60 feet; it cost £12,000. The architect was Ralph Wood, a common mason, who, having built a former arch of wood, that fell for want of weight, committed suicide from a fear of this beautiful structure experiencing a similar fate. On a sun dial, on one of the piers, is the following: "Ra. Wood, mason, 1727". This arch was built for a waggon-way to a colliery, which was set on fire, and has long been unwrought. It has been many years neglected, and is falling to ruins.

The engineer M F Barbey is more accurate on technical detail:

Reputed to be the oldest 'railway' bridge in the world ... claimed to be the fifth largest span masonry bridge in Britain, even today [1981], it remained the largest stone span for 30 years ... the arch so of semi-elliptical form, 35 ft high from springing to soffit, with a span of 105ft, its height is 80ft and it would seem to have been designed to carry a double track.

The Causey Arch carried trains until that branch closed in 1962.

== Traffic on the waggonway ==
Traffic on the Tanfield waggonway was heavy. A year after opening a third track was required: nonetheless the old main way was worn out in four years.

Gabriel Jars reported:

The longest road belongs to a very rich company, which Lord Bute, a former minister, is one of the main proprietors. This company is not only the owner of the Royalty of several mines, but it leases many others on the route. Evidently it extracts considerable volumes of coal, because the line is almost always covered with wagons. The company has spared no expense in arranging easy operation and reaching the market for the mineral it extracts.

Practically the whole of the coals from the Tanfield and South Moor districts came down to the River Tyne at Dunston, and the Grand Allies built special facilities there for the purpose. The Tanfield Waggonway was later extended to Shield Row colliery, eight miles from the Tyne.

By the early years of the nineteenth century the Main Way of the waggonway south of Rowland's Gill fell into disuse, but it had extended its Thornley branch from Winlaton Mill eastwards to Spen (Garesfeld). The Tanfield line reached to South Moor and Pontop and had a short branch to Marley Hill colliery.

== Newcastle and Carlisle Railway ==
The Newcastle and Carlisle Railway (N&CR) was formed in 1829 to build a line linking the two towns. The company was slow to finalise its route and slow to complete construction, but in September 1836 the N&CR decided to make its eastern terminus at Redheugh, on the south bank of the River Tyne, a little short of Gateshead. The route was to intersect the Tanfield waggonway near Dunston without making a junction.

An independent company, the Blaydon, Gateshead and Hebburn Railway (BG&HR) was formed in May 1834 to build a line from Blaydon to Gateshead, joining the N&CR and ascending by a rope worked incline to cross Gateshead High Street, then descending by another rope worked incline to wharves at Gateshead. The intention was to extend to Hebburn where deep water berths were available; this would avoid the transshipping into keels.

The BG&HR company approached the owners of Tanfield Lea Colliery on 2 July 1834, for the carriage of their coals: the Railway Company would take over the Tanfield Lea waggonway from its junction with the South Moor Colliery line to the Pit, paying the wayleaves, etc., and carrying the coals from the Bute Pit to Hebburn Quay for 5s. 9d. per chaldron. An agreement was subsequently drawn up on these lines binding the company to relay the old Tanfield and Tanfield Lea waggonways, thus making a new branch about 6 miles in length, before 31 December 1836.

In fact the BG&HR company was very slow to construct its authorised lines: of 16 1/2 miles it only built 1 3/4 miles, and the Newcastle and Carlisle Railway exercised its right to take over the construction.

== Stanhope and Tyne Railway ==
Promoters had brought forward the Stanhope and Tyne Railway to connect with limestone quarries near Stanhope, and collieries near Carrhouse and Medomsley (in the vicinity of the later Consett Steel Works), bringing the minerals to South Shields for transfer to shipping. The line opened in 1834. In its length it had several rope worked inclines as well as horse-worked and locomotive sections.

== Brandling's private railway ==
Gateshead and Monks Wearmouth Railway Act 1835
- Act of Parliament
- Parliament of the United Kingdom
- Long title: An Act for enabling John Brandling and Robert William Brandling Esquires to purchase and take Leases of Lands and Hereditaments for the Formation of a Railway from Gateshead to South Shields and Monk-Wearmouth, all in the County Palatine of Durham, with Branches therefrom.
- Citation: 5 & 6 Will. 4. c. lxxxiii

Dates
- Royal assent: 21 July 1835

Text of statute as originally enacted

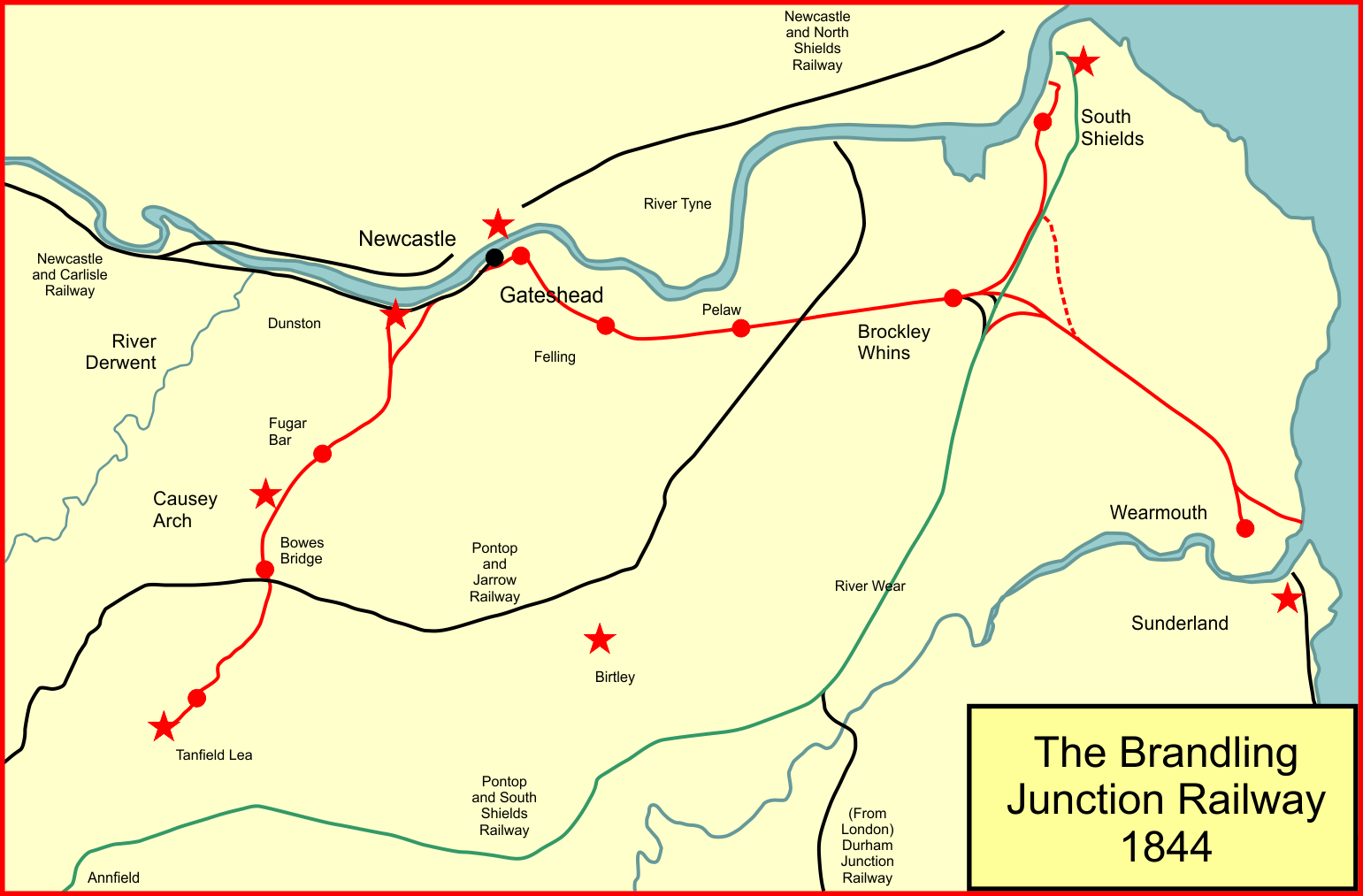
The Brandling Junction Railway

In 1834 and 1835 R. W. Brandling and John Brandling secured leases of the coal in a large area about four miles southward from South Shields and seven miles inland from the coast, and in May 1835 they proposed a railway serving this area, and connecting Gateshead with South Shields and Monkwearmouth, obtaining authorising in the Gateshead and Monks Wearmouth Railway Act 1835 (5 & 6 Will. 4. c. lxxxiii). This route covered much of the unbuilt part of the Blaydon, Gateshead and Hebburn Railway Company's route, although at a higher level, and the proposal resulted in that company losing heart. They negotiated with the Brandlings, offering to pay over £5,000 to induce them to adopt a different line. The Brandlings counter-offered that the BG&HR should meet the Brandling line at Gateshead, and abandon their proposed line east of that point, joining with the Brandlings in forming any new line. The BG&HR vacillated further and the Brandlings pushed ahead with their scheme. They obtained a report from Robert Stephenson and Isambard Kingdom Brunel stating that the Brandling plan was "in every respect preferable" to the BG&HR scheme.

The area to be served by this line was attractive to potential railway proprietors, and soon afterwards, the Gateshead, South Shields and Monkwearmouth Railway Company was formed, under the patronage of the Stanhope and Tyne Railway Company, with capital of £150,000. The Blaydon, Gateshead and Hebburn Railway Company was still intending to complete its line, so that three companies were now planning similar coverage. A meeting took place between them on 17 October 1835, at which a proposal to share the route was considered. The BG&HR authorising act had given the Newcastle and Carlisle Railway the option of taking over the BG&HR route in certain circumstances, and the N&CR now exercised that option, which resulted in the BG&HR agreeing terms to sell its line and powers completely.

Brandling Junction Railway Company Act 1836
- Act of Parliament
- Parliament of the United Kingdom
- Long title: An Act for incorporating certain Persons for carrying into effect the Purposes of an Act passed in the Fifth and Sixth Year of the Reign of His present Majesty, intituled "An Act for making John Brandling and Robert William Brandling Esquires to purchase and take Leases of Lands and Hereditaments for the Formation of a Railway from Gateshead to South Shields and Monkwearmouth, all in the County Palatine of Durham, with Branches therefrom;" and for other Purposes.
- Citation: 6 & 7 Will. 4. c. lvii

Dates
- Royal assent: 7 June 1836

Other legislation
- Relates to: Gateshead and Monks Wearmouth Railway Act 1835

Text of statute as originally enacted

The Brandling brothers' individual powers that they had acquired under their act of Parliament were transferred to a public company, the Brandling Junction Railway Company, on 14 September 1835, under the Brandling Junction Railway Company Act 1836 (6 & 7 Will. 4. c. lvii) of 7 June 1835.

== The Brandling Junction Railway ==
The Brandling Junction Railway Company now made an agreement with the Newcastle and Carlisle Railway Company (on 19 February 1836), whereby it paid £9,000 to the Newcastle and Carlisle Company for certain powers, and the N&CR agreed to the abandonment of the proposed Gateshead, South Shields and Monkwearmouth Railway. The Brandling Junction would form a junction with the Newcastle and Carlisle Railway at the point where it intended crossing the Tyne (presumed at this stage to be close to Gateshead) and to re-lay the old Tanfield Waggonway to Tanfield Lea Colliery, and to build the line planned by the Blaydon Gateshead and Hebburn company to Jarrow and to form shipping places there.

The wayleave system was firmly entrenched in the area at the time, and the brothers did not apply to purchase land, but to use wayleaves, for which they had arranged contracts, paying £2,069 annually. In the following year the brothers obtained the incorporation of a company (as opposed to their personal rights) to undertake the work; on 7 June 1836 the Brandling Junction Railway was incorporated. The wayleaves were now valued at £3,434 which the company paid the brothers, so that they acquired a 70% mark-up.

The Newcastle and Carlisle Railway had been authorised to build its line 1829, but the directors has spent many years revising the route by which their line would enter Newcastle. In fact they decided that their first approach should be to Redheugh on the Gateshead side of the River Tyne; Redheugh was on the river bank between the present day King Edward VII Bridge and the High Level Bridge. The N&CR opened its line to Redheugh on 1 March 1837.

This intersected the Tanfield Waggonway, and the Brandling Junction Railway was planned to meet the Newcastle and Carlisle Railway a short distance west of Redheugh. At the same time the Tanfield Waggonway was to have a junction made with the Newcastle and Carlisle Railway, enabling through running to the Brandling Junction line by using a short section of the N&CR. From May 1837 the Brandling Junction company began relaying the Tanfield line with heavier and better rails, and by late 1839 it had been relaid for much of its course as far as Tanfield Lea. In 1840 Tanfield Moor was reached and from that time most of the output of the mine went to Dunston over the Tanfield line; this was a severe loss to the Stanhope and Tyne Railway which had been carrying the traffic.

== Opening of the line ==
Brandling Junction Railway Act 1842
- Act of Parliament
- Parliament of the United Kingdom
- Long title: An Act to authorize the Brandling Junction Railway Company to raise a further Sum of Money.
- Citation: 5 & 6 Vict. c. iv

Dates
- Royal assent: 22 April 1842

Text of statute as originally enacted

The Brandling Junction Railway opened its first section from the junction with the N&CR near Redheugh to Oakwellgate (immediately east of Gateshead High Street) and down to the quay on 15 January 1839. From Redheugh there was a half-mile inclined plane at a gradient of 1 in 23, the line continuing through a deep cutting to Greenesfield, where there was a 60 hp stationary engine. The line then crossed Gateshead on a stone viaduct, crossing the High Street on an ornamental skew bridge. This section was operated by horse traction at first; from Oakwellgate there was a self-acting incline with gradients of 1 in 8 and 1 in 12 to the quay at the east end of Hillgatemore. The first train conveyed four waggons of coal and a carriage containing the directors of the two Companies, with the Mayor of Newcastle and other dignitaries.

The rest of the line was opened in stages; the section from South Shields to Monkwearmouth was opened on 19 June 1839. The South Shields Station stood on a site on the present-day Laygate Street, between West Holborn and Commercial Street. The site was formed by the removal of an old ballast hill during the construction of an embankment over the Dene Burn; the line continued north and then west to the bank of the Tyne at Archer's Quay.

The Monkwearmouth Station (described in many sources as "Sunderland", but located north of the River Wear) stood in Broad Street (now part of Roker Avenue). The formal opening of the line took place about noon, soon after the arrival of a steamboat from Gateshead and a train from Monkwearmouth, when three trains, each consisting of five carriages, passed along it, one drawn by the "Newcastle" engine, the second by the "Tyne," and the third by the "Wear." The procession left Monkwearmouth about four o’clock, in time to escape a terrible thunderstorm.

The South Shields station was west of the Stanhope and Tyne Railway, and the Brandling Junction line had to cross the Stanhope and Tyne a short distance south of South Shields station.

The next section to open was from Gateshead to Cleadon Lane (later known as East Boldon), where it converged with the route from South Shields; the line opened on 30 August 1839 for mineral traffic and to passengers on 5 September 1839. The Gateshead station was in the angle of Oakwellgate and the present-day St Mary's Square. This line too had to cross the Stanhope and Tyne Railway; it did so by a nearly-square flat crossing later known as Pontop Crossing, near Brockley Whins. On the same days a west-to-north curve was opened from Green Lane to Brockley Whins, enabling through running from Gateshead to South Shields. In fact the line ran alongside the Stanhope and Tyne Railway, joining the line from Monkwearmouth near South Shields. The Wearmouth Dock branch opened on 30 August 1839 also.

The date of 5 September 1839 was regarded as the main opening of the railway; the first train on this occasion was drawn by the "Wear" engine from Gateshead to Monkwearmouth, carriages being detached at Brockley Whins and drawn to South Shields by the "Brandling" engine.

On 9 September 1839 the Newton Garths branch, a curve from south to east near Brockley Whins, was brought into use and coal from the Stanhope and Tyne line passed over it for shipment at the Wearmouth Dock.

== Passenger business ==
The original opening attracted a great deal of passenger traffic:

We are glad to announce that the Brandling Junction Railway from South Shields to Monkwearmouth, has, since its opening on Tuesday week, received more support than its most sanguine friends ever expected. Between three and four thousand passengers have already been conveyed along its line, and the numbers are daily on the increase. This railway is a great accommodation to the people both of South Shields and Sunderland, as also to those of Newcastle, North Shields, and their respective neighbourhoods; and there is little doubt that the spirited Proprietors will be well rewarded for the capital they have expended. We are glad to find that the Directors are about to show their sense of the public patronage, by having an omnibus to run between the depot, at the high part of South Shields, and the Market-place and the Steam Ferry Landing. This will be a great acquisition, and will remove much of the complaint that the depot was so far from the centre of the town. We may observe that the steam-boats, on their passage from Newcastle, always stop opposite the railway station, in order to allow passengers to disembark, who may be going to Sunderland. All has gone on well since the day of opening, not the least accident having occurred to mar the pleasures of travelling on this important line of railway.

An omnibus connection was also to be laid on at Sunderland:

Arrangements are now in progress for running Omnibuses from Sunderland to the station of the Brandling Junction Railway, at Monk-Wearmouth, which will be a very great accommodation to parties travelling by this line. We understand Mr. Henderson, the spirited proprietor of the Golden Lion Hotel, has contracted with the Railway Company for running the Omnibuses, and that for better public accommodation it is Mr. Henderson’s intention to have an office at the Golden Lion, for the receiving of parcels intended to be forwarded by this railway These arrangements will very shortly come into operation.

== Contemporary description of the line ==
The Railway Times described the route:

The Junction of the Brandling with the Carlisle line is formed on the Quay, at the south side of the river Tyne, about a mile west of Gateshead; and from thence it proceeds by an incline, rising one foot in twenty-three, first along a heavy embankment, and then through a deep cutting, in some parts forty-five feet in depth, to the top of the hill in Green’s Field, where a standing engine, of sixty horse power, built by Messrs. Hawthorn, of Newcastle, has been erected for the purpose of working the incline.

Leaving Redheugh station [in fact passing above it at high level] the line passes through the town of Gateshead, along a magnificent viaduct, built of stone, which is upwards of half a mile in length, and crosses the principal street by a beautiful span, with two smaller arches enclosing the footpath... The line after crossing Oakwell Gate enters the principal station [the Gateshead station of the BJR], on an extensive mound with precipitous banks extending down to the river. A self-acting incline is at present in operation [down to the Tyne] here, and coals, which are brought along the Newcastle and Carlisle line, are regularly shipped at staiths erected for the purpose by the Brandling Company... It was resolved to build the [Gateshead] station level, on the same principle as the viaduct, with a succession of arches. There are twelve of these arches at present in course of formation... [they form] a series of tunnels running parallel to each other, and perpendicular to, or at right angles with, the main line, from which a branch line passes along the top of each tunnel to platforms which are made to descend, and thus form a communication with the area below.

Emerging from the principal station, the line makes a considerable curve, and then proceeds in a south-eastern direction, with an inclination of about fourteen feet in a mile, until it reaches the summit level within a short distance of Pelaw Main, where the line is about one hundred feet above the level of the sea. The railway passes under a neat stone bridge at Felling Hall gate, and soon after enters a cutting, from which it emerges at Hedworth Dean, which it crosses by an embankment thirty feet high. Proceeding onward, it enters a tunnel one hundred feet in length; after emerging from which the line continues through a deep cutting with side walls for about thirty yards, when it enters another tunnel four hundred and seventy feet in length. The line continues with a gentle inclination to Moncton-lane, where it passes under an oblique arch, and then proceeds by heavy embankments over Hedworth Dean... From Hedworth the line proceeds to Brockley Whins, soon after passing which a branch leads away to South Shields, whilst the main line makes a gentle curve to the south, crosses the Stanhope and Tyne Railway on the same level, and runs along a low embankment... The line enters a deep cut through limestone rock a little before it reaches Fulwell toll-bar, and just afterwards passes under a neat oblique stone arch, over which the Sunderland and Shields turnpike is carried; it then curves gently towards the south, and passes the village of Fulwell to the left, soon after which a branch railway goes down to Wearmouth Docks, whilst another branch [in fact the main line] proceeds to near the Wheat Sheaf Inn, where the line at present terminates. There is a depot for passengers and goods behind the Wheat Sheaf Inn, and it is intended to continue this line down to the river, a little above Sunderland Bridge. The Docks are approached by a self-acting incline, with an inclination of one foot in eighteen; and staiths and other conveniences are in course of erection for the shipment of coals, as well as general merchandize.

We shall now follow the course of the line from the junction at Brockley Whins to South Shields, premising that passengers direct from Shields to Sunderland, and vice versa, are not conveyed along this portion of the line, but proceed along a junction branch which runs from the main line from Sunderland to Gateshead, at a place called the Tile Sheds, and joins the line from Gateshead to Shields at West Dean Lodge. A spherical triangle is thus formed by the junction lines, the curves upon which average somewhere about sixty chains radius. The branch to Shields, after leaving the main line at Brockley Whins, proceeds on the west side of, and parallel to, the Stanhope and Tyne Railway, till it joins the branch from Sunderland at a well-known place on the Boldon-lane, called "Old Jonathans". It then crosses the Dean by an embankment, which is in some parts forty-five feet in depth, and continues past Temple town to the Railway leading from the St. Hilda Pit to the river. The line passes under Commercial-road by a short tunnel, and then enters the station yard at South Shields. This station is formed on the site of a large ballast hill, which has been partially removed for the purpose. It is situated but a short distance from Holborn, which is approached through another tunnel, about 100 feet in length, with stone abutments and a brick arch; and the line after crossing Holborn proceeds down to the St. Hilda Staiths, and terminates at Archer’s Quay, where it is proposed to erect staiths.

The rails, which are of a similar section to those of the Newcastle and Carlisle Railway, are laid on stone blocks, where the foundation is sufficiently good, but along the embankments they are laid on larch sleepers, until such time as the earth becomes consolidated, when they will be replaced as in the permanent way with stone blocks. There will be a double line of railway throughout when completed, but at present the double way is formed in some parts only.

— The Railway Times

== Brockley Whins junctions ==
References to Brockley Whins are capable of misunderstanding; at first the name simply referred to the general area. As far as the Stanhope and Tyne Railway was concerned, "Brockley Whins" as a railway location was north of the Pontop Crossing complex. The Brandling Junction Railway later (on 9 March 1840) opened a station of that name west of the Pontop Crossing; at first it was only an exchange platform for connectional purposes.

The Brandling Junction Railway (broadly west to east) and the Stanhope and Tyne Railway (broadly south to north) crossed by a flat crossing, and spurs were later laid connecting the two railways. Tomlinson and other early writers refer indiscriminately to Brockley Whins as a location on both railways independently of the station.

Junction names change over time with the development of signalling areas of control, but Cook and Hoole give:

South Shields to Monkwearmouth:

- Harton Junction; northern apex, south-westward divergence of Gateshead line;
- Tile Shed Junction; eastern apex, convergence of line from Gateshead.

Harton Junction to Gateshead:

- Green Lane Junction; intermediate northern apex; connections with Pontop and South Shields Railway;
- Brockley Whins; convergence of line from Tile Shed Junction.

1844 south to west curve:

- Hedworth Lane Junction; southern apex; divergence north-east of line to Tile Shed Junction, and divergence north of Pontop and South Shields line;
- Brockley Whins.

== Early years ==
An arrangement was made between the Brandling Junction, Stanhope and Tyne and Durham Junction Railway Companies, with the object of establishing passenger communication, partly by railway and partly by omnibus, between Newcastle, South Shields and Sunderland on the one hand, and Hetton, Houghton-le-Spring, Durham, Stockton and Darlington on the other. To enable this it was necessary to make a spur connection from the Brandling Junction line to the Stanhope and Tyne line at Brockley Whins by a short west-to-north loop line about 8 chains long. The cost was borne by the three Companies in equal proportions. The loop was opened on 9 March 1840, when the new passenger service started.

Tomlinson says "Having closed the Biddick or Harton Branch soon after it had been opened, the Brandling Company brought their traffic between South Shields and Sunderland round by Brockley Whins." The "Biddick or Harton Branch" is the original direct line from South Shields as far as the convergence at Cleadon Lane (or Tile Shed Junction). It closed on 9 March 1840. Passenger traffic was diverted, for connectional purposes at Brockley Whins station; evidently there was little demand for non-passenger traffic between South Shields and Monkwearmouth.

Until 1844 there was a complex procedure for the joining and dividing of passenger trains at Brockley Whins station; the trains from and to Monkwearmouth, South Shields and Gateshead converged more or less simultaneously at Brockley Whins and a convoluted shunting procedure resulted in through carriages being exchanged between the trains.

Tomlinson adds:

Between 1840 and 1844... another skilful manoeuvre, not unattended with danger, was performed at Brockley Whins when the train from Rainton Meadows [on the Durham Junction Railway] happened to arrive too late to catch the Brandling Junction train, and had to proceed to Gateshead with the passengers. It was necessary for the engine to be changed from one end of the train to the other. Detached from the moving train about half-a-mile from Brockley Whins [actually from the north junction of the complex, at Green Lane Junction], when it steamed ahead past the junction, then ran back to the junction and entered the loop line [towards Brockley Whins station], the carriages following at a slower rate of speed had also passed the junction, the engine slipped out through the points and regained possession of its train which it then took, tender first, through the loop line to Brockley Whins and thence to Gateshead.

An inner, small radius connection from west to north at the Pontop Crossing, duplicating the 1839 connection, was opened on 9 March 1840.

== Passengers on the Tanfield branch ==
The Brandling Junction Railway started carrying passengers on the Tanfield Branch on 16 June 1842, between Tanfield Lea and Gateshead. There were four recognised stations at Tanfield Lea, Bowes Bridge, Fugar Bar and Redheugh (N&CR), and "an unofficial stopping place by the Whickham Turnpike at Lobley Hill". The passenger service operated only on Saturdays and the journey time was an hour. At first a passenger coach was provided but soon coal wagons were the means of conveyance. The passenger service was discontinued about 1844. (Note: Quick (page 279) gives more detail, amplifying that in Whittle, page 46: Opened 18 June 1842; trains ran on Tuesdays, Thursdays and saturdays; there was one train each way except on pay Saturdays when there were two trains back from Gateshead, at 3 1/2 and 4 1/2. The trains ran to and from Oakwellgate (Gateshead) and probably ceased on 2 September 1844.)

== Signalling ==
Flag signals were used to give instructions to enginemen approaching the flat crossings at Brockley Whins and Boldon Lane (the site of the later Tyne Dock station); instructions from November 1839 indicate the procedure. Near the crossing, on each line, stood three posts, a short distance apart, the first post on the Brandling Junction line having a white flag upon it and the first post on the Stanhope and Tyne line a red flag. When a train reached the first post the engineman blew his whistle; at the second post he slackened speed; if there was a flag hoisted at the crossing—white for the Brandling Junction and red for the Stanhope and Tyne trains he proceeded through the crossing at half speed, but if no flag was exhibited, or if both flags were hoisted and waved backwards and forwards he stopped at the third post. The same rules were observed at night time, when lamps were hoisted instead of flags. During fogs he blew his whistle at intervals all the way from the first to the third post, where he was obliged to stop and send his fireman to the signalman for orders.

== Rolling stock and fares ==
The company used six-wheeled steam locomotives with four-wheeled tenders; they burnt coke. Passenger carriages had three compartments; those for first class carried 24, and the second class carriages seated 30 passengers; the coaches were painted bright yellow picked out with black. Seven services ran each weekday at an average speed of 15 miles per hour (24 km/h); the fare from Gateshead to Monkwearmouth was 1s 6d for first class and 1s. Over 186,000 passengers were carried in the four months to the end of January 1840.

== Great North of England Railway ==
In October 1835 plans had been put forward for a Great North of England Railway, "for the purpose of connecting Leeds and York with Newcastle-upon-Tyne and forming a continuation of all the proposed lines from the metropolis towards Scotland"—a significant step in creating the present East Coast Main Line. As these plans took shape, the question of the crossing of the Tyne was a major issue, and on 14 November 1837, the GNoER gave notice of its intention to build a bridge from Redheugh, near the Newcastle and Carlisle Railway terminal (opened 1 March 1837), to Knox's Field on the north bank. This was near to the location of the 1906 King Edward VII Bridge, but it would have been at a low level. The Brandling Junction Railway was planned to approach at a much higher level and was now too important to leave out of the consideration, so that it appeared that two bridges might be necessary at different heights. It was suggested that this could be avoided if the line of approach of the GNoER was altered: instead of running in along the valley of the River Team its route could be altered to run by way of Rainton Meadows, Washington, Heworth and Gateshead, running over parts of the Durham Junction Railway and the Brandling Junction Railway.

The chief railway event of 1840 was to have been the opening, on 25 November, of the Great North of England Railway—the longest of the great Yorkshire lines—but the works were not completed in time and, much to the disappointment of the directors, this event had to be postponed until the beginning of 1841.

== Modernising the Tanfield line ==
Since 6 February 1839, the Brandling Company had been engaged in re-laying the old Tanfield Lea waggonway between the Colliery and Lobley Hill (5 1/4 miles) and in making a short connecting line (3/4 mile) between it and the Team branch. Leaving some of the heavier works to be finished afterwards, they began the leading of coals on 26 November 1839, employing horses on those parts of the line which were intended to be worked by stationary engines. Rising 536 feet in 3 1/4 miles and falling 90 feet in 2 1/4 miles, the line presented a series of gradients varying from 1 in 12 to 1 in 454, which involved several changes of motive power. Between Redheugh and Tanfield Lea there were three horse planes [at Tanfield Lea (5/8 mile), Lobley Hill (1/2 mile) and the Teams (7/8 mile)], three engine planes [the Causey Wood west incline (1/4 mile), the Causey Wood east incline (1 7/8 miles) and the Sunniside incline (1 mile)], and two self-acting inclines, (the Lobley Hill incline (5/8 mile) with a gradient of 1 in 18 and the Fugar Bar incline or Baker's Bank (1 mile) with gradients of 1 in 12 and 1 in 21).

Traffic from the Tanfield line had to pass over about 250 yards of the Newcastle and Carlisle Railway at Redheugh to reach the incline of the Brandling Junction.

The Tanfield Moor branch was an extension of the Tanfield branch. It rose from Tanfield Lea to Whitelee Head on gradients of 1 in 22 and 1 in 15, which allowed it to be worked by gravity. It formed the last of the series of inclines, which, representing a difference of level of 800 feet in 6 1/2 miles, "made the Tanfield branch one of the most interesting lines of the North Eastern Railway system". By means of this short branch, the Brandling Junction Railway Company were enabled to divert to their own line and shipping places the Tanfield Moor coals which for six years had been conveyed along the Stanhope and Tyne Railway to South Shields. In consequence of this diversion of traffic, a mile and a quarter of the latter railway—between Tanfield Moor and Harelaw—fell into disuse. Though the Tanfield line was opened throughout, it was not until 1 March 1841, that the company were able to make use of the stationary engines in the conveyance of their coals.

Wire ropes were just coming into use at the close of this period; they appeared on the Brandling Junction Railway in June 1841.

== Financial impropriety ==
The Stanhope and Tyne Railway Company found itself in serious financial difficulty in a scandal in which the directors had been misrepresenting the profits of the company. This prompted shareholders in the Brandling Junction Railway to inquire into their own company's state of finances, and a Committee of Investigation was appointed on 6 May 1842. After a lengthy and exhaustive inquiry they found that the Brandling Junction Railway too was not paying its way, although annual accounts had been published stating the contrary. Dividends at 6% had been paid out of capital and it was found that the directors had been in the habit of misrepresenting the accounts at the end of the half-year, to give the appearance of a profit. As well as improper accounting, the directors had raised money for capital works on their personal bonds, subsequently vesting these in themselves and mortgaging to themselves the remainder of the shares unissued. Apart from the improper acquisition of shares, this resulted in an annual interest charge amounting to £16,460 in 1842. In consequence of these revelations the company's shares fell in the market upwards of 50 per cent.

Meanwhile, the Stanhope and Tyne Railway, in a much worse trading condition, went into liquidation. Its railway assets and the operation were transferred to a new company, the Pontop and South Shields Railway, in 1842.

== Traffic development ==
For some time after the opening of the Brandling Junction railway, the shipment of coal was confined to Gateshead and Monkwearmouth. Shipping berths had been secured at South Shields, but the Brandling company could not get rail access to them until they upgraded and converted the gauge of the old Manor Wallsend waggonway of 1810, which was their only means of access. They were obliged to alter the whole waggonway, and to alter the wheels of the colliery waggons to suit the widened gauge. Some delay took place in the construction of the coal drops due to the exceptionally wet autumn of 1839. The company finally started shipping coal from South Shields on 5 February 1840. They had two drops (one used jointly with Messrs Brandling in their own right) and a spout; the Stanhope and Tyne Railway Company had eight drops, making altogether ten drops and a spout: an inadequate capacity for the quantity of coal which needed to be shipped from South Shields. A proposed dock of 20 acres was supposed to be constructed at Jarrow Slake, and the Tyne Dock Company obtained an act of Parliament for the purpose on 1 July 1839, with capital of £150,000. Tenders had been invited for the construction, but the Tyne Dock Company proprietors were mainly shareholders of the Stanhope and Tyne Railway, which at this time was discovering the extent of its financial difficulties, and the dock construction was never started.

On 18 June 1842 the company started to carry passengers between Tanfield Lea and Gateshead. They also completed the extension of their line from the west end of South Shields to the centre of the town, a distance of 7/8 mile, opening a new passenger and goods station at Heron's Hill on 17 December 1842. The new station was close to the steam ferry terminal and the market place, and opening notices referred to it as Market Place station. The old station at West Holborn was replaced by a small station called High Shields in Wreken Dyke Lane at Grewcocks.

The Brandling Junction Company was busy enlarging the scope of their business by means of private railways. Using the Pelaw Main Waggonway they drew traffic from Birtley and Urpeth, and by means of the Springwell waggonway they conveyed passengers to and from Jarrow by horse power. Their ownership of the modernised Tanfield Waggonway route already gave them access to Tanfield Moor; when the Derwent Iron Company opened a 1 1/4 mile line from Tanfield Moor to Harelaw (near Annfield Plain) on 26 December 1843, the Derwent Company chose to send lead and lime from the western end of the old Stanhope and Tyne Railway (now Pontop and South Shields Railway) down the Tanfield line. Consett Ironworks was newly founded with enormous potential for growth, and more efficient rail transport of the ironworks output was the motivation for the Derwent Company; securing the bulk of this traffic was a huge advantage for the Brandling Junction Railway.

They made a short (3/4 mile) branch at South Shields to Metcalf's Dock from which they began shipping coals in the spring of 1844 relinquishing the original Archer's Quay, and by arrangement with the Pontop and South Shields Company, they secured the whole of the south traffic in passengers and goods between Brockley Whins and South Shields.

While this was going on, George Hudson's group of main line railways were improving the north–south trunk route that became the East Coast Main Line. On 15 April 1844, a portion of his Newcastle and Darlington Junction Railway (successor to the Great North of England Railway) opened connecting lines near Durham on 15 April 1844. The Pontop and South Shields Company had laid down a third line of rails between Washington and Boldon for the exclusive accommodation of the Newcastle and Darlington traffic; jointly with the Brandling Junction Company they built a branch line from Boldon to Brockley Whins: a south to west curve, which opened on 19 August 1844. From 24 May 1844 trains could run from London and York to Gateshead via Washington and Brockley Whins, from 24 May until 19 August 1844 reversing at the north apex of the junctions.

== Acquisition by George Hudson ==
George Hudson had long been working on forming a continuous route from London (at that time Euston Square station) to Gateshead. On 18 June 1844 the public opening of the line took place; a special train conveying the Hon H. T. Liddell MP, and eight other gentlemen, left Euston Square at 5.30 a.m. and arrived at Gateshead at 2.24 p.m., considered an extraordinary time. However the route involved running over several different companies' lines in succession. A month's working of the railway showed the difficulty of divided management, and George Hudson therefore opened negotiations with the directors of the Brandling Junction Railway for the purchase of their line. When they did not offer good terms to him, Hudson gave instructions for surveys to be made for an independent, shorter, line from Washington to Newcastle, and he published the advantages of his new line, adding that the Brandling Junction directors had demanded an unreasonable price. The Brandling Junction directors saw that they might lose everything and they came to terms with Hudson: eight days afterwards on 18 August Hudson got the line on his own terms. He was to take possession of the line on 1 September, with a right to the net receipts from 1 July, and paying £55 for each £50 share. Hudson bought the railway in his own name and on his own responsibility, but on 16 July he transferred the bargain to the Newcastle and Darlington Junction Company, receiving as a consideration the promise of an allotment of 500 of the new shares.

The Newcastle and Darlington Company duly took possession of the Brandling Junction line on 1 September 1844 and on this date, they closed the old Oakwellgate station in Gateshead for passenger traffic. Their Greenesfield station had been in use for some time and the Brandling route passenger traffic was transferred there.

== After 1844 ==
From 1 September 1844 the Brandling Junction Railway ceased to have an independent existence, and was part of the Newcastle and Darlington Junction Railway, which was itself part of George Hudson's group of companies. The domestic traffic continued largely unchanged, but the new owner's emphasis was on the development of the north–south trunk route. This included crossing the River Tyne, and the means, and location, of doing so was not immediately clear.

As part of the strategic objective, some name changes and mergers took place: in 1846 the Newcastle and Darlington Junction Railway changed its name to the York and Newcastle Railway; the following year it merged with other companies to form the York, Newcastle and Berwick Railway, and in 1854 further mergers resulted in the formation of the North Eastern Railway.

George Hudson had earned the title of the Railway King by his adroit manipulation of railway companies, finances and shareholders, but at length difficult questions were posed. On 20 February 1849, a question was raised at the half-yearly meeting of the York, Newcastle and Berwick Company by Mr. Robert Prance, of the London Stock Exchange regarding shares acquired by Hudson. Among many other irregularities, it was shown that he had purchased the Brandling Junction Railway on excessively favourable terms; one of the former Brandling shareholders published a pamphlet to show the inadequacy of the price given for it. The resulting scandal brought Hudson's resignation and withdrawal from railway affairs.

The 1844 arrangement by which London to Gateshead passenger trains ran via Brockley Whins was modified by the opening of a direct line between Washington and Pelaw, sometimes referred to as the Usworth line, on 1 October 1850 (goods and minerals 1 September 1849). The High Level Bridge had opened, spanning the River Tyne from Gateshead to Newcastle, on 15 August 1849 (Note: Some crossings on a temporary structure had been made previously.) so that the East Coast Main Line was now in place and reasonably direct, running via Washington. It was not until 1868 that the present route via Durham was opened.

On 1 January 1867 the North Eastern Railway re-opened the north-to-east connection between Harton Junction and Tile Shed Junction, that had originally only been in use for a short time. The NER also opened the Team Valley Line to passenger trains on 1 December 1868, enabling direct running between Durham and Gateshead, and from that date the former Brandling Junction Railway lines no longer formed part of the main line from London.

== Tanfield branch improvements ==
The Tanfield branch had several engine-worked inclined planes, with the intermediate sections worked by horses. In July 1881 locomotive operation was started, with closure of the inclines.

== The twentieth century ==
In 1923 the main line railways of Great Britain were "grouped" under the Railways Act 1921 and the North Eastern Railway was a constituent of the new London and North Eastern Railway (LNER). A further government-directed reorganisation took place in 1948 when the LNER and other railways were nationalised, together forming British Railways.

With the working out of many of the collieries in the area as the twentieth century progressed, and the concentration on more efficient methods of coal working and of transport, the original mineral aspect of the Tanfield and Brandling lines declined too. Iron ore became a particularly difficult commodity, and it was imported in large volumes to serve existing steelworks, which brought much traffic to the railway, albeit against the gradient.

Traffic on the Tanfield branch had declined steeply after 1918, and indeed by 1945 it was about one-third of the 1907 volume. Tanfield Moor colliery closed in 1947 and the LNER closed the Tanfield Moor incline. The final colliery that gave traffic to most of the branch was Tanfield Lea, which closed on 24 August 1962, resulting in closure of the branch south of Watergate colliery at Lobley Hill. That colliery followed into closure at 18 May 1964, and the whole branch fell into disuse.

The south-to-east curve at Brockley Whins closed in 1958, followed by the Tile Shed Junction to Harton Junction branch in 1965. The Wearmouth Docks branch closed in 1966. The quay connections at South Shields were consolidated and the shipping traffic concentrated on Tyne Dock, resulting in considerable rationalisation of the former Brandling lines at South Shields in 1981. In 1985 a new north-to-east curve was opened at the Brockley Whins junction complex.

The original core route from Gateshead to Monkwearmouth remains open, and part of it is followed by the Nexus metro service operated by Tyne and Wear Passenger Transport Executive.

The Tanfield Railway runs a heritage operation on part of the former Tanfield Waggonway route near Causey. The remainder of the Brandling Junction Railway and of the Tanfield Waggonway are no longer in railway use.
