= Queen Elizabeth II Bridge, River Tyne =

Metro Bridge over the River Tyne, England

Queen Elizabeth II Metro Bridge
- The Queen Elizabeth II Metro Bridge in 2026
- Coordinates: 54.9645°N 1.6139°W
- OS grid reference: NZ247634
- Carries: Tyne and Wear Metro
- Crosses: River Tyne
- Locale: Tyneside
- Official name: Queen Elizabeth II Bridge
- Owner: Nexus
- Maintained by: Nexus Rail
- Preceded by: King Edward VII Bridge
- Followed by: High Level Bridge, River Tyne

Characteristics
- Design: Steel truss construction with fabricated box chords
- Total length: 352.7 m (1,157 ft)
- Width: 10.31 m (33.8 ft)
- Longest span: 164.7 m (540 ft)
- Clearance below: 25 m (82 ft)

Rail characteristics
- No. of tracks: 2
- Track gauge: 1,435 mm (4 ft 8 1/2 in)
- Electrified: 1500 V DC

History
- Designer: W. A. Fairhurst & Partners
- Constructed by: Cementation Construction Ltd; Cleveland Bridge & Engineering Company
- Construction start: 1976
- Construction end: August 1978
- Opened: 15 November 1981
- Inaugurated: 6 November 1981; by Queen Elizabeth II

Location
- Interactive map of Queen Elizabeth II Metro Bridge

The Queen Elizabeth II Bridge carries the Tyne and Wear Metro between Newcastle upon Tyne and Gateshead over the River Tyne in North East England. The line is in tunnels on either side of the river and only emerges into open air to cross the bridge.

== History ==
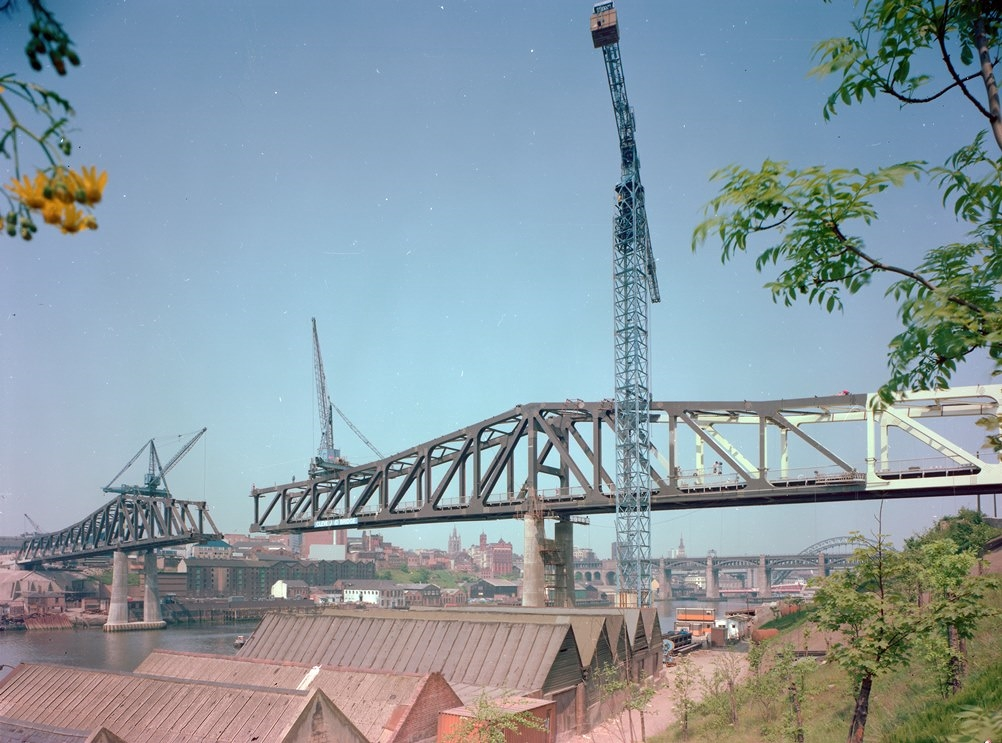
The bridge under construction in 1978

The bridge was developed as part of the Tyne and Wear Metro system, for which it was purpose-built. It was designed by W. A. Fairhurst & Partners, and constructed by Cementation Construction Ltd. and the Cleveland Bridge & Engineering Company at a cost of £4.9 million. The two sections of the bridge were built simultaneously from each bank and eventually met in the centre in August 1978. It was officially opened by Queen Elizabeth II on 6 November 1981, nine days before regular Metro service began. It is similar to Ballachulish Bridge on the A82 which opened in 1975, which was also built by the Cleveland Bridge & Engineering Company.

It was one of two major bridges built specifically for the Tyne and Wear Metro, the other being the Byker Viaduct crossing the Ouseburn valley.

== Nocturne artwork ==
In 2006, Nexus, operators of the Metro, commissioned artist Nayan Kulkarni to install a huge artwork on the bridge. The artwork, Nocturne, sees the bridge painted two distinct tones of blue, while at night, 140 Lumiflood 36 LED lighting units create an ever-changing pattern of colours based on photographs submitted by members of the public.

Nocturne was completed and opened on 26 April 2007 and means that all five main bridges across the Tyne between Gateshead and Newcastle have unique lighting schemes. However, as of 2021 the lighting system is not operational, with Nexus citing operational costs.

Next bridge upstream	River Tyne	Next bridge downstream
King Edward VII Bridge; East Coast Main Line	Queen Elizabeth II Bridge; Grid reference NZ248634	High Level Bridge; B1307 and Durham Coast Line
