= Redheugh Bridge =

Road and pedestrian bridge over the River Tyne, England

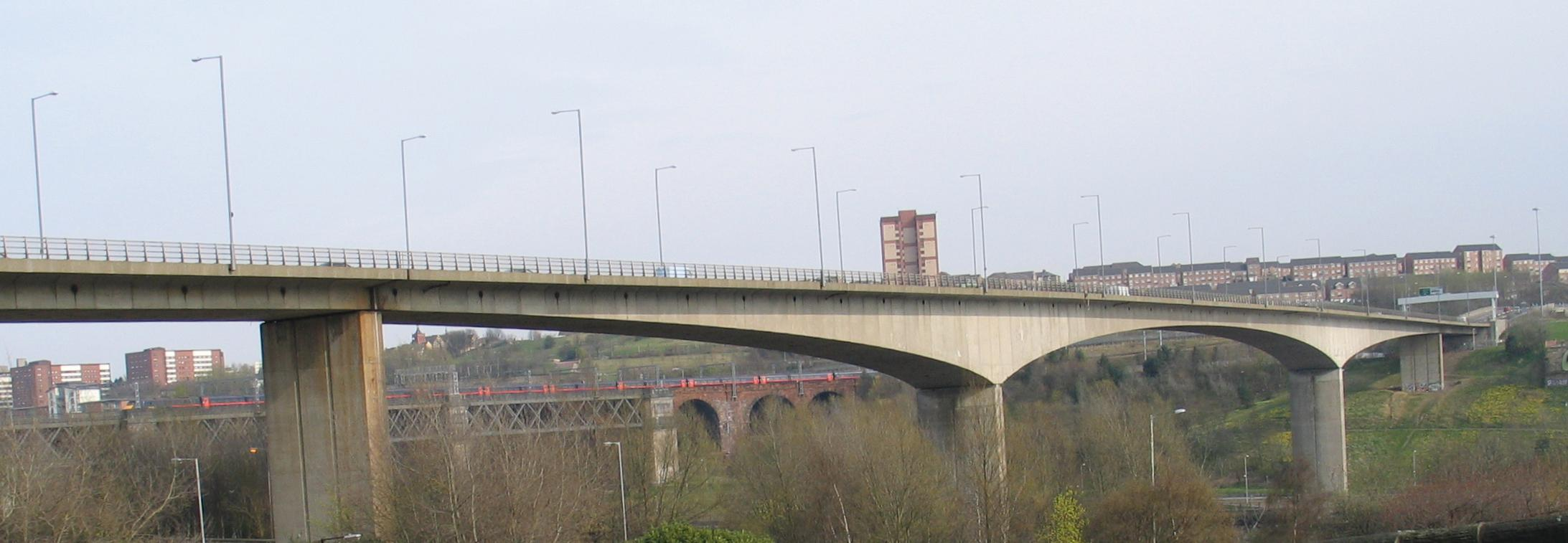
- Redheugh Bridge, photographed from the north side at Newcastle from the Newcastle Arena
- Coordinates: 54.9620°N 1.6186°W
- OS grid reference: NZ245630
- Carries: A189 road; Motor vehicles; Cycles; Pedestrians
- Crosses: River Tyne
- Locale: Tyneside
- Preceded by: Scotswood Bridge
- Followed by: King Edward VII Bridge

Characteristics
- Material: Pre-stressed concrete
- Total length: 897 m (981 yd)
- Width: 15.8 m (52 ft)
- Longest span: 160 m (170 yd)
- No. of spans: 3
- Clearance below: 26 m (85 ft)
- No. of lanes: 4
- Design life: 120 years

History
- Designer: Mott, Hay and Anderson
- Engineering design by: Alan Yiu Lun Wan
- Constructed by: Edmund Nuttall Ltd
- Construction start: 1980
- Construction cost: £15.35 million
- Inaugurated: 18 May 1983; by Diana, Princess of Wales
- Replaces: Second (1897) Redheugh Bridge

Location
- Interactive map of Redheugh Bridge

The Redheugh Bridge (/ˈrɛd.jʊf/, RED-yuuf) is a road bridge spanning the River Tyne west of Newcastle upon Tyne city centre on the north bank and Gateshead town centre on the south bank, in North East England. It carries the A189 road.

== First crossing ==
Prior to a bridge crossing was the Redheugh Ferry service at the site of where Redheugh Bridge is today, and can be seen on Ordnance Survey maps of Newcastle-upon-Tyne and Gateshead.

Plans to build a bridge across the River Tyne to link the western extremities of Newcastle and Gateshead were first proposed in 1830, and were revived in 1859. Both schemes anticipated a combined road and rail bridge. The 1859 plans were thwarted by the North Eastern Railway, who had their own plans for a rail bridge. The promoter of the bridge was Richard Cail, a prominent builder in Newcastle, and he subsequently proposed a road bridge.

Redheugh Bridge Act 1866
- Act of Parliament
- Parliament of the United Kingdom
- Long title: An Act for making and maintaining a Bridge across the River Tyne to connect the Boroughs of Newcastle-upon-Tyne and Gateshead, with Approaches thereto; and for other Purposes.
- Citation: 29 & 30 Vict. c. lxiii

Dates
- Royal assent: 11 June 1866
Other legislation
Amended by	Redheugh Bridge Act 1869
Repealed by	Tyne and Wear Act 1976

Status: Repealed

Redheugh Bridge Act 1869
- Act of Parliament
- Parliament of the United Kingdom
- Long title: An Act to amend The Redheugh Bridge Act, 1866.
- Citation: 32 & 33 Vict. c. ix

Dates
- Royal assent: 13 May 1869
Other legislation
Amends	Redheugh Bridge Act 1866
Repealed by	Tyne and Wear Act 1976

Status: Repealed

Text of statute as originally enacted

Cail had formerly acted as a contractor for many of the works of the Newcastle and Gateshead Water Company, and was joined in promoting the bridge by two directors of that company, Richard Snaderson and Christian Allhusen. They formed the Redheugh Bridge and Approaches Company in 1865, and obtained an act of Parliament, the Redheugh Bridge Act 1866 (29 & 30 Vict. c. lxiii) to authorise the project in the following year. The act included a clause to allow both the water company and the Newcastle and Gateshead Gas Company to hold up to £5,000 in shares, with the proviso that the dividend on these holdings would be one per cent lower than that paid to other shareholders. Both companies were particularly interested in the bridge, since gas and water supplies between Newcastle and Gateshead were carried over the Tyne Bridge, which was about to be replaced by a swing bridge. The Tyne Commissioners had offered the water company £10,000 in compensation for the loss of this service, and the pipelines were carried across the river on a temporary bridge which also carried road traffic, while the swing bridge was under construction.

The bridge was designed by Thomas Bouch (later Sir Thomas), who was also the designer of the first Tay Bridge in Scotland, which failed catastrophically in December 1879, and of Hownes Gill Viaduct for the Stanhope and Tyne Railway, which still stands at Consett in County Durham, and is now used as a footpath and cycle route. Bouch's design for Redheugh consisted of a long truss, supported by three piers, one in the centre of the river and one at either side. The piers continued above the level of the truss, and were braced to it, while the truss connected to arched stone viaducts at either end. There were delays during the construction, caused by financial issues and the difficulties of getting materials to the site. It opened to pedestrians on 1 May 1871, and to all traffic in June. The road deck was 30 m (98 ft) above river level with a footpath at either side.

The piers were spaced at 252-foot (77 m) intervals, and the total length of the truss was 743 feet (226 m). Each pier had four legs, constructed from cast iron columns. These rested on a 12-foot (3.7 m) diameter caisson, which was sunk to a depth of 60 feet (18 m) below high water level. Diagonal bracing from the top of the lattice towers connected to the decking one-third of the way along each span.

The design was probably unique, in that the upper beams of the trusses consisted of a tube, 27 inches (690 mm) in diameter, which was used as a gas main by the Gas Company. The lower beams formed a trough, and the water company ran their 12-inch (300 mm) mains through them. Once the bridge was completed, both companies were able to disconnect the mains that ran over the temporary timber bridge near the site of the swing bridge. A toll house was situated on the Newcastle side of the bridge, but revenue was less than expected, until development on the Gateshead side took place, and the income enabled healthy dividends to be paid. However, structural faults began to emerge as early as 1885, and inclined props were added to the piers to try to rectify the situation. As the faults got worse, investigation showed that repairs would cost more than a new bridge, and so it was replaced.

== Second crossing ==
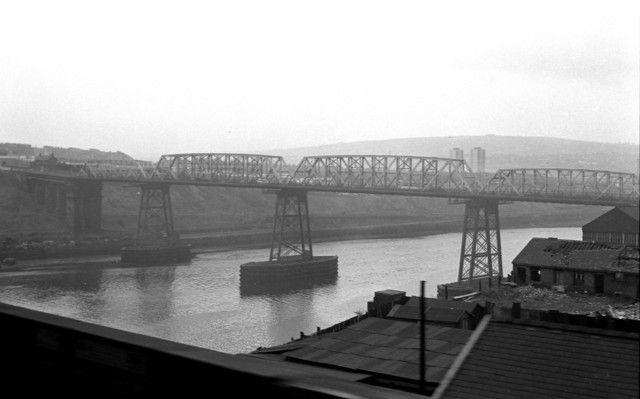
The second Redheugh Bridge

Replacement commenced in 1897 with the new bridge being built by Sir William Arrol & Co. around the old structure. Once again the process was hindered by delays in materials and an inadequate workforce. By 1900 the main girders and spans were in place and, ingeniously, hydraulic jacks were used to inch along the newly built superstructure until it rested on the previously constructed piers. The remains of the old structure were removed and the bridge was opened in August 1901. However, by the 1960s serious design flaws once again became apparent. Speed restrictions of 10 miles per hour (16 km/h) and weight restrictions of between 8 and 10 tonnes hindered the traffic flow and engineers stated that, if it remained in use for much longer, the approaches and superstructure would need to be rebuilt. It was seen as more economical to build a new crossing.

== Present crossing ==
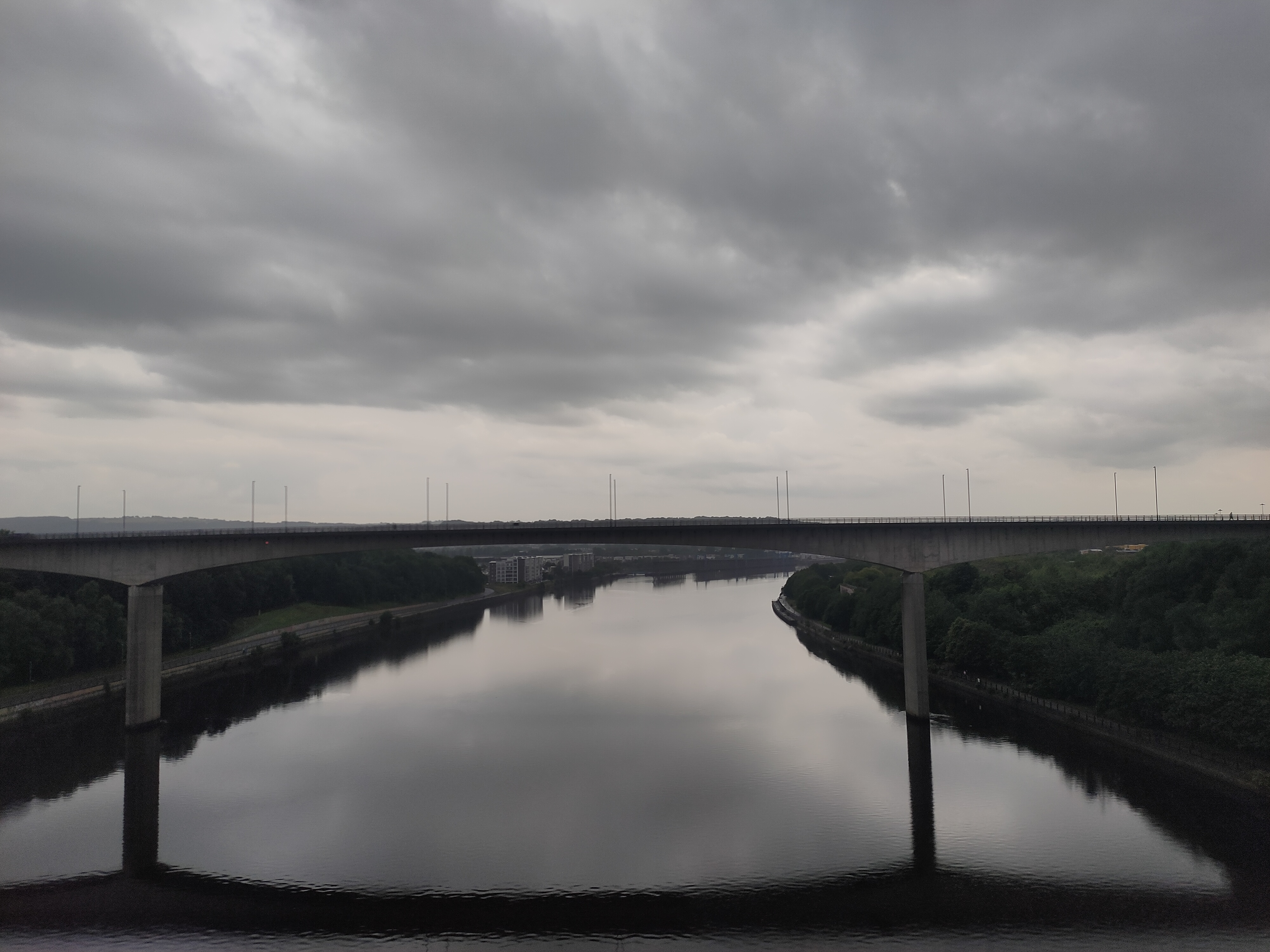
Redheugh Bridge from the neighbouring King Edward VII Bridge

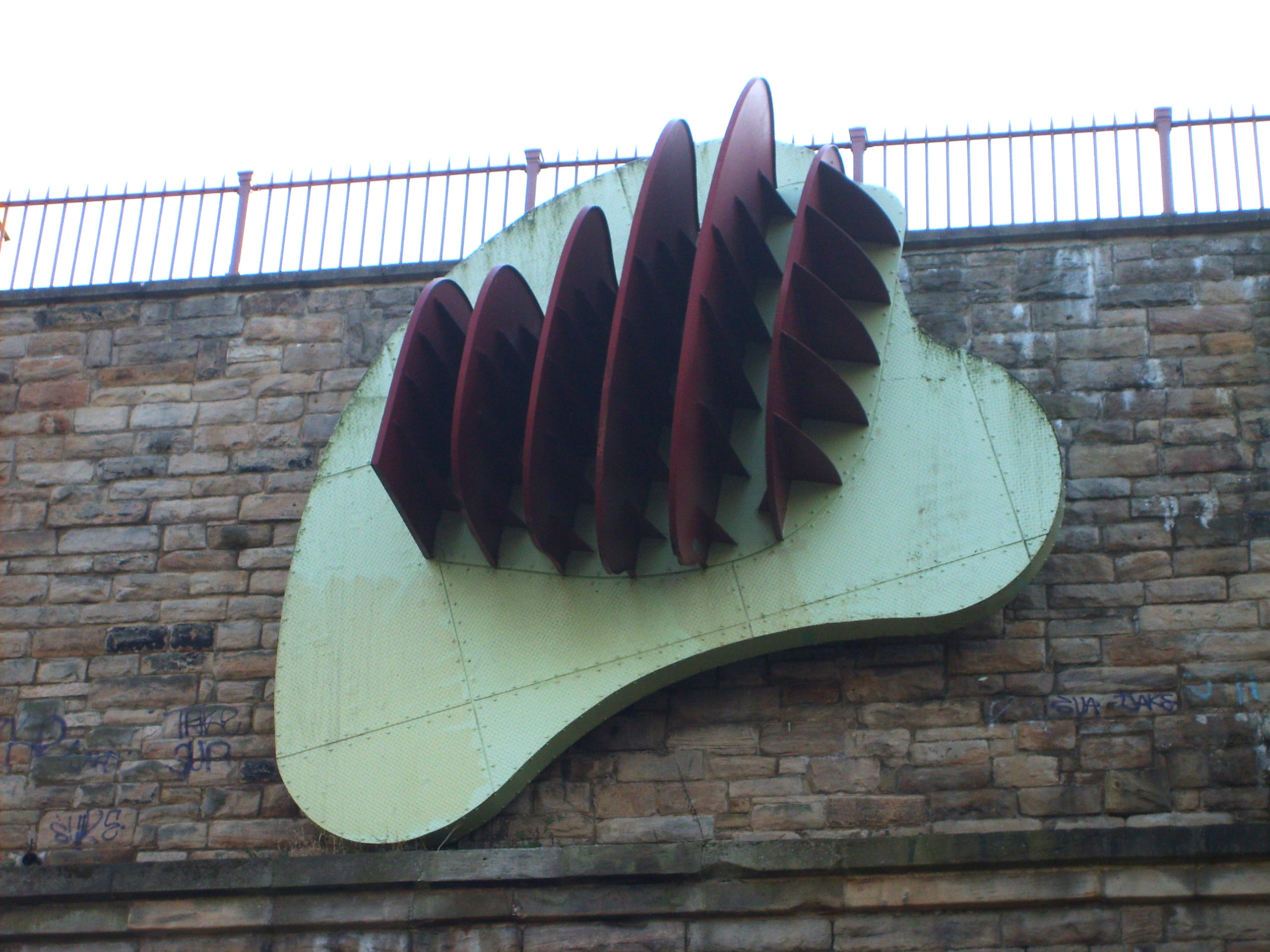
Richard Deacon's Once Upon a Time sculpture

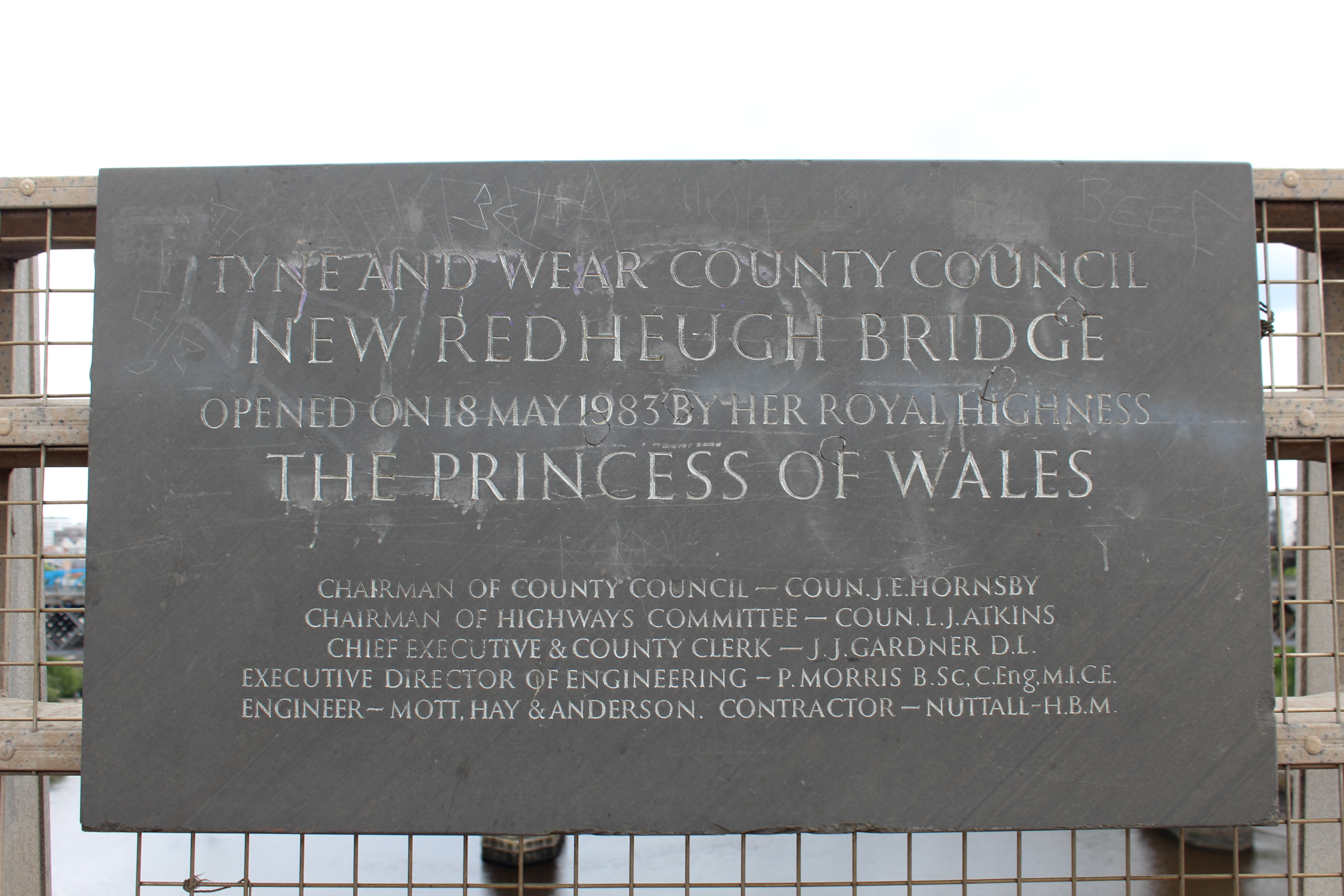
Plaque mentioning the opening.

Work to replace the second crossing began in 1980. Of the original crossing, only the south abutment now remains (adorned by a modern sculpture designed by Richard Deacon). The third bridge is very different from its two predecessors. It is a pre-stressed concrete structure with a central span of 160 m (520 ft), 26 m (85 ft) above the river, and two side spans of 100 m (330 ft) each (including the approaches, it is a total of 897 m (2,943 ft) long and 15.8 m (52 ft) wide). It can carry abnormal loads of up to 400 tonnes, and has a life expectancy of 120 years. It was constructed by Edmund Nuttall Ltd to a design by Mott, Hay and Anderson's young engineer, Alan Yiu Lun Wan.

The two supporting concrete piers were fluted to create an impression of lightness and were designed to withstand the impact from a vessel of ten thousand tonnes travelling at a speed of five knots, although this is highly unlikely as large ships rarely come this far up the Tyne and the shipping lane has now effectively been blocked by the Gateshead Millennium Bridge. Due to the exposed location, strong winds can cause problems for high-sided vehicles. Early in the bridge's life, a double-decker bus was nearly blown over the side.

The bridge was opened on 18 May 1983 by the Princess of Wales. The total cost amounted to £15,350,000.

== See also ==
- Orwell Bridge

Next bridge upstream	River Tyne	Next bridge downstream
Scotswood Bridge; A695	Redheugh Bridge; Grid reference NZ243631	King Edward VII Bridge; East Coast Main Line
Next road bridge upstream	River Tyne	Next road bridge downstream
Scotswood Bridge; A695	Redheugh Bridge; Grid reference NZ196638	High Level Bridge; B1307 and Durham Coast Line
