= High Level Bridge, River Tyne =

Road-rail bridge in Tyneside, England

High Level Bridge
- High Level Bridge in 2026
- Coordinates: 54.9669°N 1.6086°W
- OS grid reference: NZ251636
- Carries: Upper deck; Durham Coast Line; East Coast Main Line; Tyne Valley Line; Lower deck; B1307 road; (Restricted to buses and taxis); Cyclists; Pedestrians
- Crosses: River Tyne
- Locale: Tyneside
- Owner: Network Rail
- Maintained by: Network Rail (structure); Newcastle City Council (road)
- Heritage status: Grade I listed

Characteristics
- Design: Girder bridge
- Total length: 407.8 m (1,338 ft)
- Width: 12.2 m (40 ft)
- Longest span: 38.1 m (125 ft)
- No. of spans: 6
- Piers in water: 3
- Clearance below: 25.92 m (85.0 ft)
- No. of lanes: 1 (southbound only)

Rail characteristics
- No. of tracks: 2 (Originally 3)
- Track gauge: 1,435 mm (4 ft 8 1/2 in)
- Electrified: 25 kV 50 Hz AC OHLE

History
- Designer: Robert Stephenson
- Engineering design by: T E Harrison
- Constructed by: John Rush and Benjamin Lawton of York
- Fabrication by: Hawks, Crawshay, and Sons; John Abbot and Co. of Gateshead Park Works; Losh Wilson and Bell of Walker Ironworks
- Construction start: 12 August 1847
- Construction end: 7 June 1849
- Opened: 15 August 1849
- Inaugurated: 28 September 1849; by Queen Victoria

Location
- Interactive map of High Level Bridge

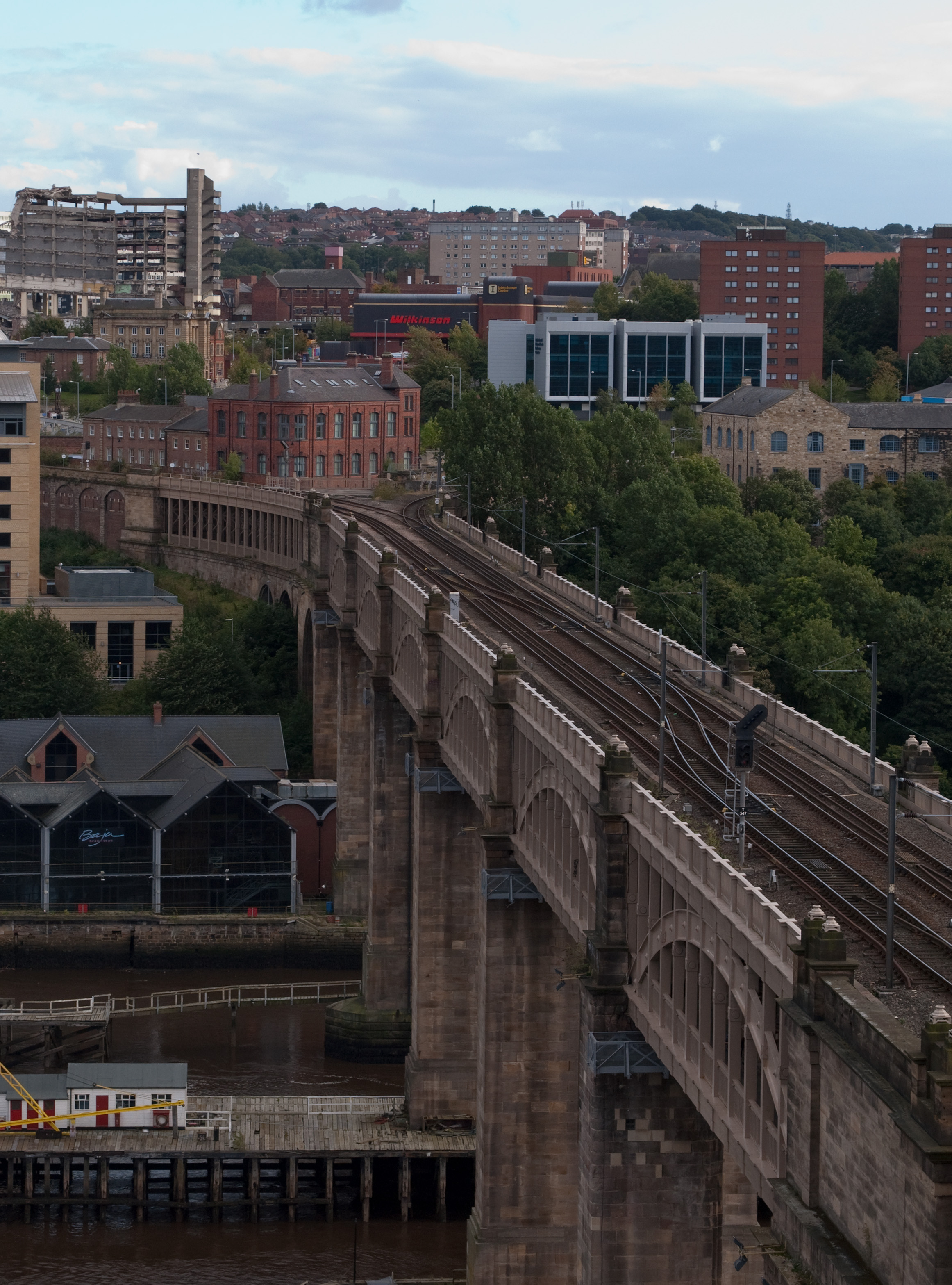
The High Level Bridge in 2010

The High Level Bridge is a road and railway bridge spanning the River Tyne between Newcastle upon Tyne and Gateshead in North East England. It was built by the Hawks family from 5,050 tons of iron. George Hawks, Mayor of Gateshead, drove in the last key of the structure on 7 June 1849, and the bridge was officially opened by Queen Victoria later that year.

It was designed by Robert Stephenson to form a rail link towards Scotland for the developing English railway network; a carriageway for road vehicles and pedestrians was incorporated to generate additional revenue. The main structural elements are tied cast-iron arches.

It continues to carry rail traffic, although the King Edward bridge nearby was opened in 1906 to ease congestion. The roadway is also still in use, with a weight restriction. It is a Grade I listed structure.

== First bridge proposals ==
The Newcastle-upon-Tyne and Carlisle Railway Act 1835 (5 & 6 Will. 4. c. xxxi) authorised the Newcastle and Carlisle Railway (N&CR) to approach Newcastle to a terminus at Redheugh, on the south bank of the River Tyne, close to the end of the present-day New Redheugh Bridge. The act also authorised a crossing of the Tyne there, giving rail access to the north shore quays. The river was shallow at this point, and the bridge would have been at a low level, only 20 ft (6.1 m) above high water. The line would then have climbed to a terminus at the Spital, near Neville Street and the east end of the present-day Newcastle Central station. The climb was to be at a gradient of 1 in 22 and would have been operated by a stationary steam engine with rope haulage.

Hitherto railways in the region had had a local focus, but now the Great North of England Railway (GNER) obtained authorising Acts to build from Newcastle to York, forming part of a continuous trunk railway network to connect to London; the project was controlled by George Hudson, the so-called Railway King. At first the GNER was content to get access to the N&CR Newcastle terminus, by connecting with the N&CR at Redheugh and running over its line across the Tyne and up to the Spital. This had the advantage of avoiding a separate, and expensive, crossing of the river, but would have meant a steep descent to Redheugh as the GNER line approached on high ground from the Team Valley, only to climb once again to the Spital. Moreover, William Brandling had made known his intention to reach Newcastle from his line by running at a high level through Gateshead. On 25 April 1837, the N&CR decided to build to their south side, low-level terminus at Redheugh, but to leave the issue of the Tyne crossing open.

Richard Grainger was a developer in Newcastle, and had acquired lands at Elswick (on the north bank of the Tyne west of the proposed Redheugh crossing). In 1836, he published a pamphlet recommending a crossing of the Tyne there, and the formation of spacious railway terminal accommodation there. Drawing attention to the limited scope for extending eastwards from the Spital, and "in the event of an Edinburgh Railway also terminating in this situation, the interchange of passengers, goods, and cattle would be greatly increased".

Grainger's plan was not adopted, and the Brandling Junction Railway reached Gateshead in 1839. The GNER ran out of money and it was superseded in Hudson's railway empire by the Newcastle and Darlington Junction Railway, which opened its line using the Brandling Junction Railway from the south east instead of through the Team Valley. The Brandling Junction line had a terminus in Gateshead at Greenesfield at a high level, and the N&CR line was built climbing on an inclined plane at a gradient of 1 in 23 from Redheugh to reach that. The Newcastle and Darlington Junction Railway opened its line from the south to Pelaw, allowing its trains to reach Gateshead over the Brandling Junction line, in 1844. The tables had been turned, and indeed for a while Greenesfield was the de facto main station for the conurbation of Newcastle and Gateshead.

John and Benjamin Green were a father and son architectural practice active in Newcastle. In 1841 Benjamin Green had proposed a high level bridge for road traffic, substantially on the alignment of the actual High Level Bridge; and sensing the commercial climate he explained how it could be adapted for railway use. He failed to get any financial support, but in 1843 George Hudson was looking for ways to extend his railway network northwards, and the Greens' scheme fitted with his takeover of the Newcastle and Darlington Junction Railway; the line was authorised by the Durham Junction Railway Act 1844 (7 & 8 Vict. c. xxvii) on 23 May 1844, and the act included the road bridge.

== Definite plans ==
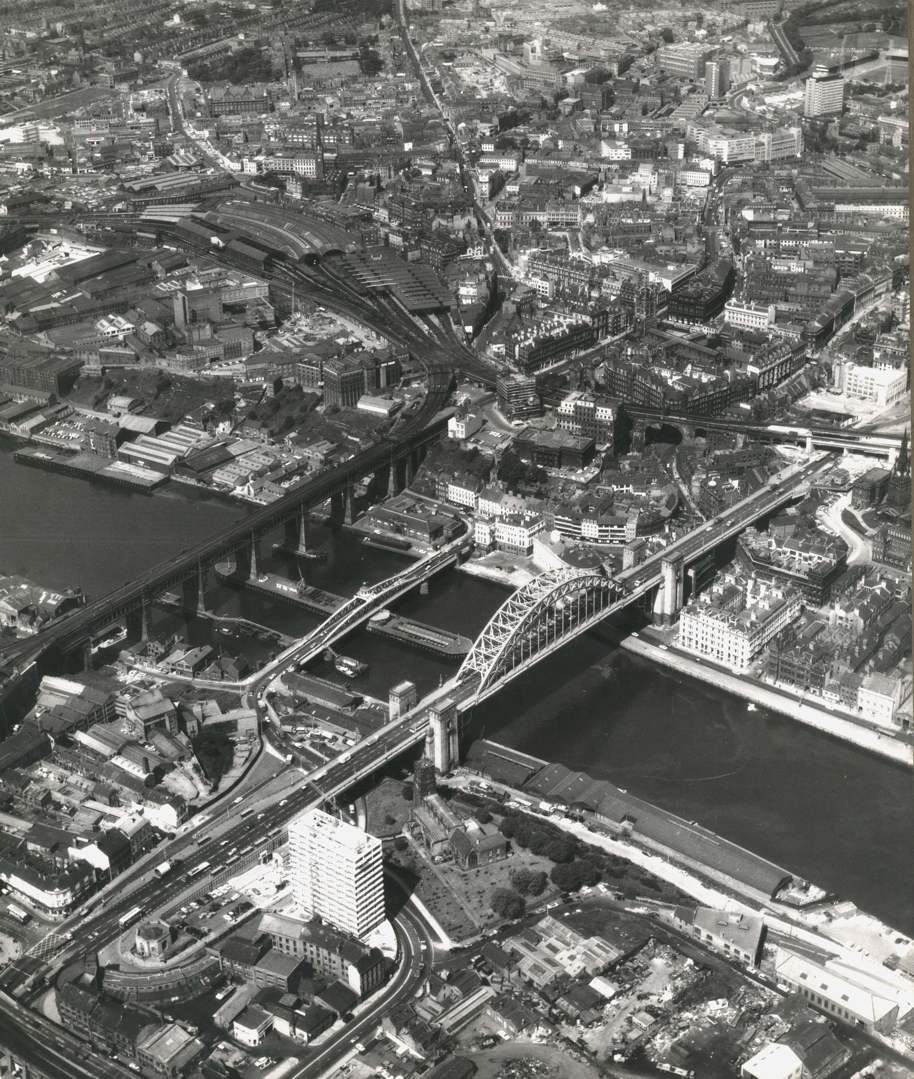
The High Level Bridge (left) in 1967

The Newcastle and North Shields Railway had opened in 1839 from its own terminus at Carliol Square, on the north-east edge of Newcastle. As a purely local concern, the disconnection was not important, but interest gathered in a railway to central Scotland; the "Edinburgh Railway" foreseen by Grainger. A Scottish concern, the North British Railway, had got its act of Parliament the previous year to build as far south as Berwick-upon-Tweed.

Now Hudson was intent on capturing the line to Edinburgh for his empire, and he encouraged the development of railway plans to get there; the route such a line might take continued to generate considerable controversy. There was still ambiguity about Hudson's intentions for the bridge—an easier crossing point at Bill Quay, two miles downstream had been considered—and Newcastle Town Council sought undertakings from him. In addition, he promised a footway crossing; this was apparently not a sweetener to the town council, but a commercial decision, expected to bring in £250 a week. The footway crossing was later extended to include horse-drawn vehicles.

Finally, the Newcastle and Berwick Railway was authorised by act of Parliament of 31 July 1845. The line would cross the Greens' high level bridge, starting from the Gateshead Greenesfield station, and commitments made to the building of a bridge by the Newcastle and Darlington Junction Railway were transferred to the Newcastle and Berwick Railway.

== Design ==
A British Rail Class 800 "Azuma" electric multiple unit on the railway deck and a pedestrian below in 2026

The bridge was to be designed by Robert Stephenson; T E Harrison did the detailed design work.

The height of the railway, at about 120 ft (37 m) above high water, was determined by the level of the Brandling Junction line in Gateshead. A double-deck configuration was selected because of road levels on the approaches, and to avoid the excess width of foundations which a side-by-side arrangement would require. The deck width was determined by the useful roadway width plus the width of structural members, which gave the railway deck the width for three tracks.

The foundations were to be difficult because of the poor ground conditions in the river, and this ruled out an all-masonry structure, so cast iron or wrought iron was inevitable for the superstructure. A tied arch (or bow-string) design was favoured because the outward thrust imposed by an arch is contained by the tie; no abutments capable of resisting the thrust could be provided here.

Stephenson had used this configuration before; he recorded that, "The earliest railway bridge on the bowstring principle is that over the Regent's Canal, near Chalk Farm, on the London and Birmingham Railway".

The arch would consist of iron ribs. Fawcett says, "The reasons for not using wrought iron was due to some engineers' distrust of rivetting, the relatively small size of wrought iron plates then available, and the higher cost… On 1 October 1845 when the Newcastle and Berwick Board instructed T E Harrison for their bridges, none of the uses of wrought iron had been developed far enough to be considered as an alternative to cast iron for the High Level Bridge. A tubular bridge might have been considered by Robert Stephenson but the distance between solid and reasonably shallow foundations would have given a span much larger than the Britannia Bridge."

The depth of rock in the riverbed resulted in a height of 140 ft (43 m) from there to the superstructure. Three river piers were permitted by the Tyne Improvement Commissioners, and therefore four river spans of 125 ft (38 m) were decided on; there were additional subsidiary spans on the shore.

The cast iron arch ribs are 3 ft 6 in (1.07 m) deep at the crown, increasing to 3 ft 9 in (1.14 m) at the springing, with 12-inch (30 cm) flanges; the flanges and webs were three inches thick; in the case of the inner ribs, and two inches for the outer ribs. The rise was 17 ft 6 in (5.33 m), determined by the desired geometry to confine the horizontal thrust within bounds. Each arch was cast in five sections, bolted together.

Stephenson described the tie bars:

The ties consist of flat wrought-iron bars, 7 inches by 1 inch of best scrap iron, with eyes of 3½ inches diameter, bored out of the solid, and pins turned and fitted closely. Each external rib is tied by four of these bars, and each internal rib by eight. The sectional area of each external tie is 28 [square] inches, and of each internal tie 56 [square] inches, giving a total area of 168 square inches. These bars were all tested to 9 tons on the square inch.

The rail deck is supported above the arches by twelve 14-inch (360 mm) square columns at 9 feet 11 inches (3.02 m) centres. Suspension rods supported the road deck, and both decks had two layers of diagonally laid three-inch deck timbers on suitable wrought iron cross girders (and rail-bearers in the case of the rail deck).

The main contractors for the ironwork were Hawks, Crawshay, and Sons, who were assisted by John Abbot and Co., of Gateshead Park Works, and Losh Wilson and Bell, of Walker Ironworks, in the production of the castings. The tender was accepted at £112,000. The contract for the bridge piers and land arches and for the Newcastle Viaduct were won by John Rush and Benjamin Lawton of York for £94,000 and £82,500 respectively. The total cost of the contracts at 1999 prices would be over £30 million.

== Construction ==
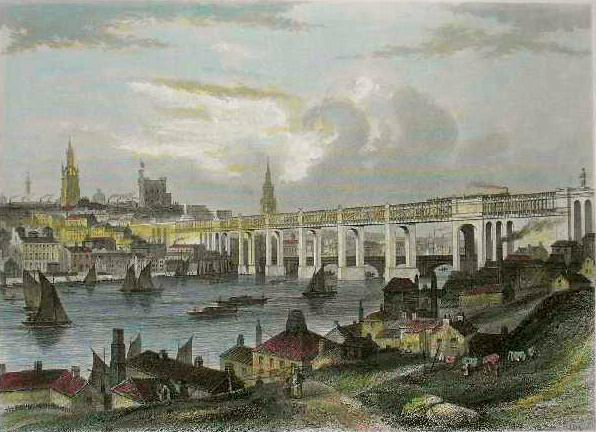
The High Level Bridge in 1863, looking downstream

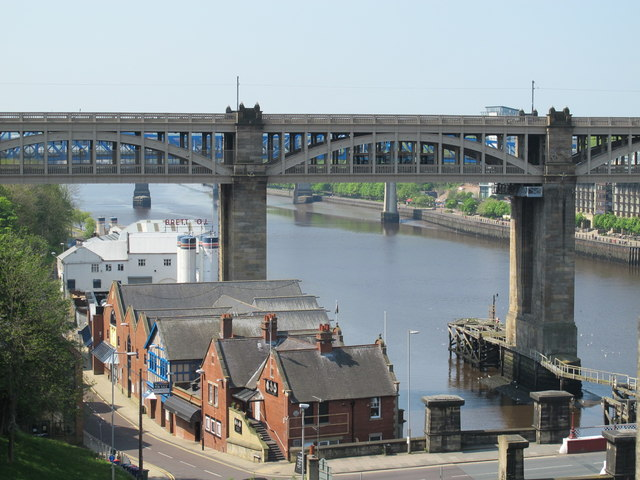
The High Level Bridge in 2012, looking upstream

The first masonry was laid on 12 January 1847. A temporary timber viaduct on the east side was ready on 20 August 1848.

Timber coffer dams were constructed; they were 76 ft 6 in (23.32 m) by 29 ft (8.8 m) with two skins, the space between being filled with puddle clay. James Nasmyth had a novel design of steam pile driver; it had first been used in Devonport Docks in 1845; it could deliver 60 to 70 blows a minute; the cycle time with the hand-operated pile drivers formerly in use was four minutes. The drop weight was 1½ tons and its stroke was 2 ft 9 in (0.84 m); one was purchased from Nasmyth.

The ground gave considerable trouble during construction; Stephenson recorded:

Many difficulties occurred in driving the piles which considerably retarded the progress of the work, and, among others, the peculiar effect of ebb and flow during this operation is worthy of note. At flood-tide, the sand became so hard as almost totally to resist the utmost efforts of driving, while at ebb the sand was quite loose, and allowed of doing so with facility. It was therefore found necessary to abandon the driving on many occasions during high water. The difference between high and low water is 11 feet 6 inches. Another difficulty arose from the quicksands beneath the foundations. Although the piles were driven to the rock bottom, the water forced its way up, baffling the attempts to fill in between them; this, however, was remedied by using a concrete made of broken stone and Roman cement, which was continually thrown in until the bottom was found to be secure.

The arch ribs were erected in section by travelling crane; each arch was temporarily erected at the contractor’s works. The first was placed on 10 July 1848, and the erection of the ironwork was quick.

Already on 29 August 1848, it was possible to pass a special train over the first arch, and over a temporary structure for the rest of the crossing:

The High Level Bridge Over the Tyne: This important junction between the York and Newcastle and the Newcastle and Berwick Railway has been completed, and the event was celebrated on Tuesday last. In the afternoon of that day, a train of [specially invited] passengers passed along the temporary timber viaduct from the station at Gateshead to the station at Newcastle. Mr Hudson and several other Directors of the York, Newcastle, and Berwick line, who had been visiting Sunderland ... proceeded in a special train from that town to Gateshead... Several carriages were then added to the special train, and an open truck placed at each end, in which bands of music were stationed. The shrill sound of the whistle gave the signal for a royal salute, under the booming of which the train passed along the line, the band playing, and the thousands assembled to witness the event, rending the air with joyous acclamation Upon reaching the bridge, the bands struck up the well-known local air of "The Keel Row" which they continued till the train had reached the solid ground on the northern side of the river... The train proceeded to the Newcastle and Berwick station, where the company alighted and walked in procession to the Queen’s Head Inn, where a magnificent entertainment had been provided for the Directors and their friends, by the Mayor of Newcastle.

[From the south abutment of the High Level Bridge] and the river pier on the south side, the cast iron arch and road-way are nearly completed, and the second arch will be in progress in the course of a few weeks. From the middle of the first arch, the line curves to a temporary timber viaduct erected along the west side of the intended bridge. The height of this viaduct is one hundred and twenty feet to the level of the rails; it is built upon piles, which are driven between thirty and forty feet into the bed of the river. Its stability was sufficiently tested on Monday, when Captain Leffan (sic), the Government Inspector of Railways, examined it preparatory to the opening. On that day, two powerful engines weighing upwards of seventy tons, traversed it at different degrees of speed for between two and three hours; the weight would be about one ton to a foot, being four or five times greater than the temporary structure will ever be required to bear, and the result was, in the highest degree, satisfactory.

Among the company in the train were four ladies, who are deserving of honourable mention, from the courage they displayed in accompanying it, namely, Mrs Nichs. Wood, and Miss F. Wood, Mrs I. L. Bell, and her sister, Miss Pattinson of Washington. As the train passed steadily over the bridge the anxiety of the immense multitude seemed intense, and the scene was truly exciting, yet fearful—not only from the lofty eminence occupied by the train but, from the apparent narrowness and nakedness of the platform on which it rolled along. It seemed from its noiselessness, rather an aerial flight, than the rattling sweep of the iron horse.

Ordinary traffic appears to have used the temporary single line structure after this date.

The eastern track was ready for an inspection by Captain Laffan, Inspecting Office for the Board of Trade, when he visited on 11 August 1849; a load test with four tender locomotives and eighteen wagons loaded with ballast, a total weight of 200 tons. Laffan approved the bridge:

I believe all the works of the bridge are completed, and that I believe it to be perfectly secure and safe. The Company have as yet only laid one line of rails over this structure, and I beg to recommend that permission be given to open that one line.

The first passenger train crossed the completed structure on the morning of 15 August 1849.

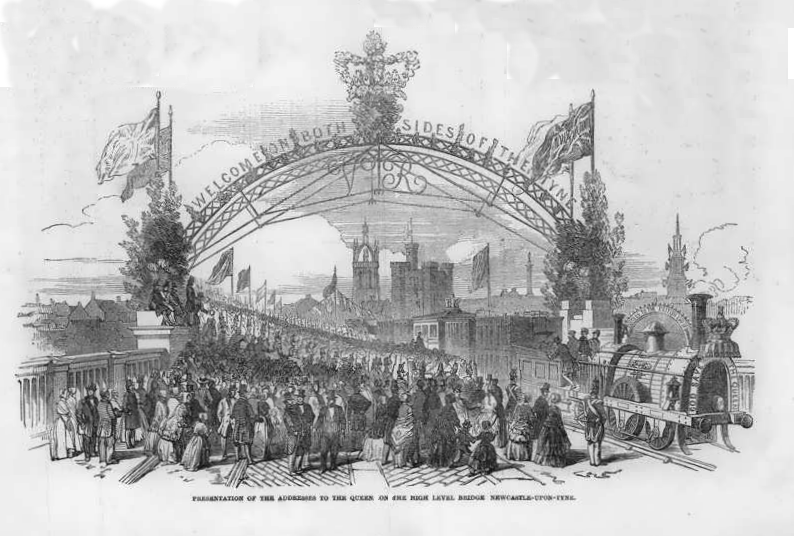
The inauguration of the High Level Bridge by Queen Victoria on 28 September 1849

Queen Victoria formally inaugurated the bridge on passing through by train on 28 September 1849.

The Queen at Newcastle: Her Majesty yesterday honoured this ancient borough with her presence. The event was one of universal and all-engrossing interest... The morning, unfortunately, was dull and the weather unsettled, giving forebodings of a wet and uncomfortable day... Notwithstanding, however, the unfavourable weather dense crowds assembled at every spot in this locality, where a view of the royal carriage could be obtained, and many remained for hours exposed to the weather in order that they might retain the places which at an earlier period of the morning they had secured. The bridge was densely lined with people, and the platform was well covered, though not inconveniently crowded. A profusion of banners were displayed on this elegant and substantial structure, and from nearly all the public and many of the private buildings both in Newcastle and Gateshead. The vessels in the river hoisted their flags mast-high on the occasion, and the church bells of the two towns rung many a merry peal in honour of the royal visit... Pursuant to a request issued by the Mayor, most of the shops were closed about 11 o’clock, and the manufacturers were desired by our worthy chief magistrate "not to produce smoke between that hour and one," with which we believe, they generally complied... At precisely twenty minutes past twelve, the royal carriage appeared in sight, and when it reached the Spital, a splendid locomotive, built by the celebrated house of Stephenson and Co., gaily decorated and bearing on its front "God save the Queen" surmounted by a crown, and a suitable inscription encircling the boiler, was attached to the train. It then slowly proceeded to the centre of the colossal fabric, amidst bursts of loud and rapturous cheering from the assembled thousands, her Majesty repeatedly acknowledging these marked demonstrations of loyalty and affection from her faithful and attached subjects.

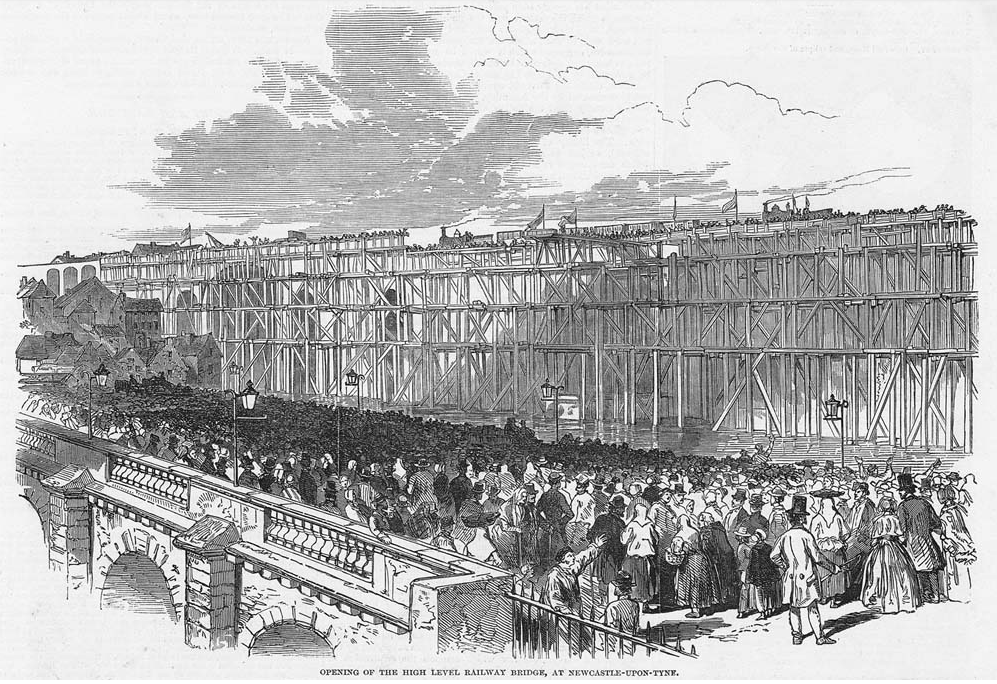
The inauguration of the High Level Bridge on 28 September 1849

The Mayors of Newcastle and Gateshead presented a formal address. The queen travelled in the royal carriage belonging to the London and North Western Railway.

In other carriages were members of her Majesty’s suite and the directors of the York, Newcastle, and Berwick Railway. The engine drawing the royal train was under the direction of Mr T. E. Harrison, the resident engineer, and driven by Mr Thos. Carr... After staying altogether from five to ten minutes, the train was again put in motion, and amidst firing of artillery and rapturous plaudits from the dense throng, proceeded en route to Darlington.

The bridge and its immediate approaches had cost £243,000.

== Road usage ==
The road deck was opened in 1850.

The company charged tolls on use of the road crossing; a pedestrian paid a halfpenny, and the crossing was open initially from 5 am until 6 pm; from June 1871 24-hour access was made available.

About 1880, a horse-drawn omnibus service was operated across the bridge; the fare was a halfpenny, the same as the pedestrian toll; the bus operator paid a toll of 4d.

Addyman considers that road vehicle toll income was less than might have been expected (£2,000 in 1853), and attributes this to the success of suburban passenger railway business.

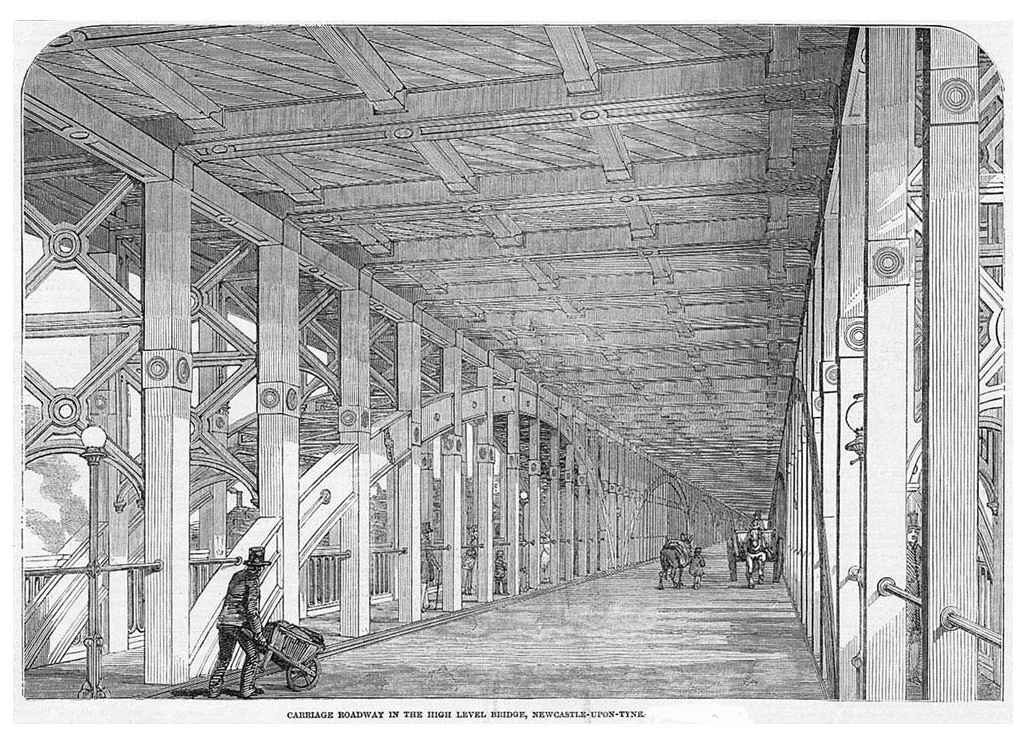
The carriageway level of the High Level Bridge

In the twentieth century street passenger tramways built up in Newcastle and Gateshead, and in 1920 agreement was reached to connect the two systems by running across the High Level Bridge. This was implemented in 1923.

On 10 May 1937, the tolls on the road crossing were removed; Newcastle and Gateshead corporations paid the London and North Eastern Railway, now the owner of the bridge, £160,000 in commutation of the tolls.

== Threatened by fire 1866 ==
On 24 June 1866, there was a serious fire in a corn mill close to the line on the Newcastle shore. The fire grew and became a total conflagration, and the timber decking of the High Level Bridge caught fire. It appeared this might engulf the entire bridge.

Under the superintendence of the engineers, workmen were told off to cut through the carriage and foot roads, that being the only way of preventing the flames from spreading along the bridge. The men worked with goodwill and soon succeeded in cutting several holes through the asphalt and timber. How to play with the water on the underside was a difficulty soon got over. Four or five men, with a courage most commendable, volunteered to be lowered down, through the holes in the pathway, by means of ropes, enabling them to direct the water directly on to the burning woodwork. For a long time their efforts seemed to be without effect; no sooner was the fire put out in one part of the bridge than another beam burst into flames. For several hours streams of water were thrown against the bridge, ultimately with success. In order to put the spreading of the fire beyond doubt, the workmen on the bridge cut through the entire width of the carriage and footway, making a gap at both the Newcastle and Gateshead side... In no way, however, is the safety of the bridge endangered. The railway traffic was suspended from about half-past eight o'clock in the morning, until two in the afternoon, not from any apprehensions that the upper level was insecure, but on account of the smoke and flames, and also because of the hose which was lying across the rails.

So serious damage to the bridge was averted, and after a thorough inspection the following day, trains were allowed to resume normal running. The cost of the damage to the bridge was estimated at between £2,000 and £3,000.

== Increasing loads ==
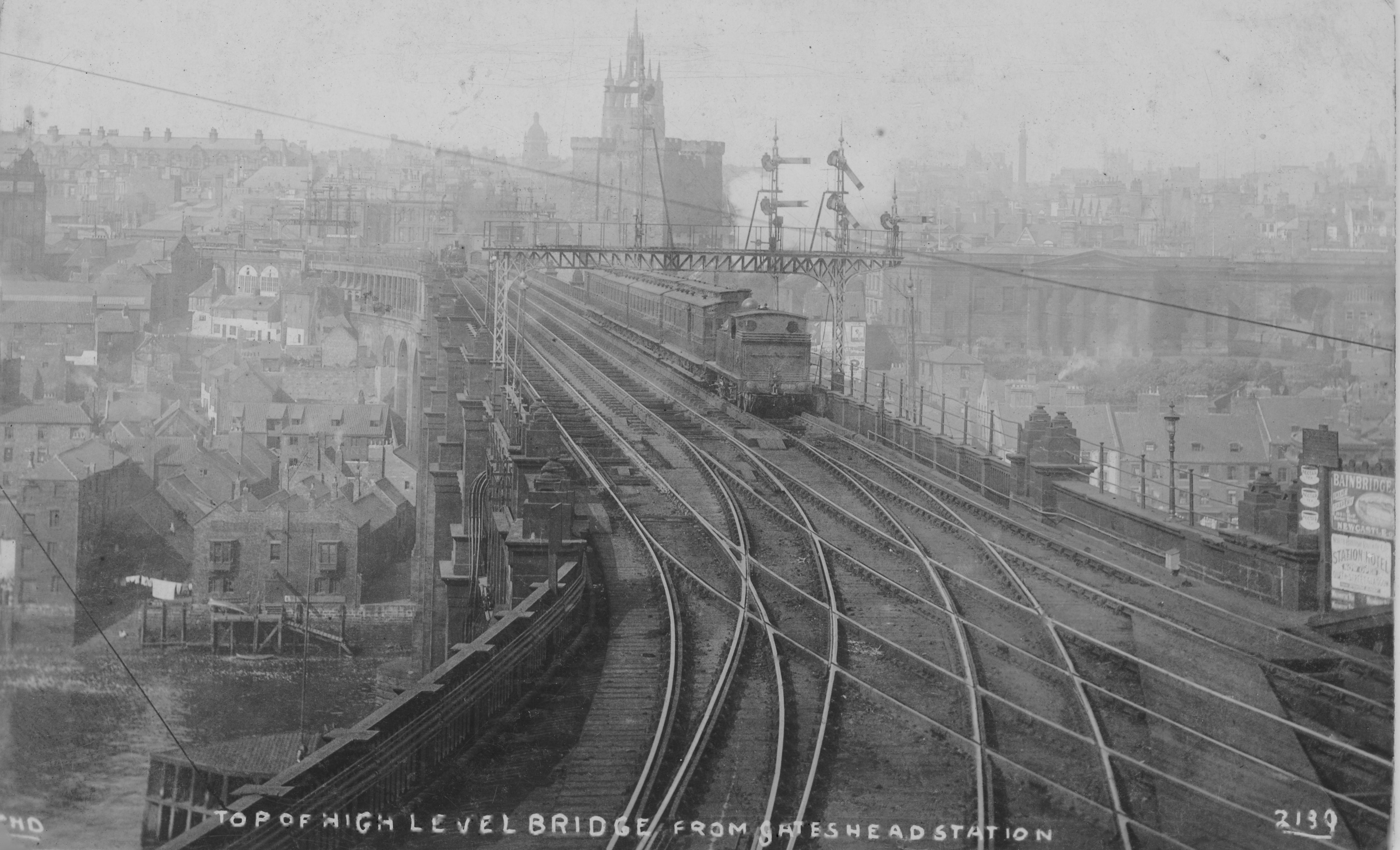
High Level Bridge from Gateshead Station

When Laffan carried out the load test on opening of the bridge, the locomotives of the day weighed typically 20 tons; it was said at the time that the load test imposed "a greater weight in all probability than will ever pass along the bridge again". (Note: The quotation is in Addyman and Fawcett, page 56 and is unattributed, but it had been used earlier about the Union Bridge over the River Tweed, a suspension bridge of 1820. See John Sykes, Local Records, or Historical Register of Remarkable Events which have occurred in Northumberland and Durham, Newcastle-upon-Tyne and Berwick-upon-Tweed, volume II, self published by John Sykes, Newcastle, 1833, and M A Richardson, The Local Historian's Table Book of Remarkable Occurrences, volume III, self-published by M A Richardson, Newcastle, 1843)

Locomotive weights increased considerably in the succeeding years. The cross-girders supporting the track were cast iron and by 1890 they were considered to require strengthening, which was done with steel box girders.

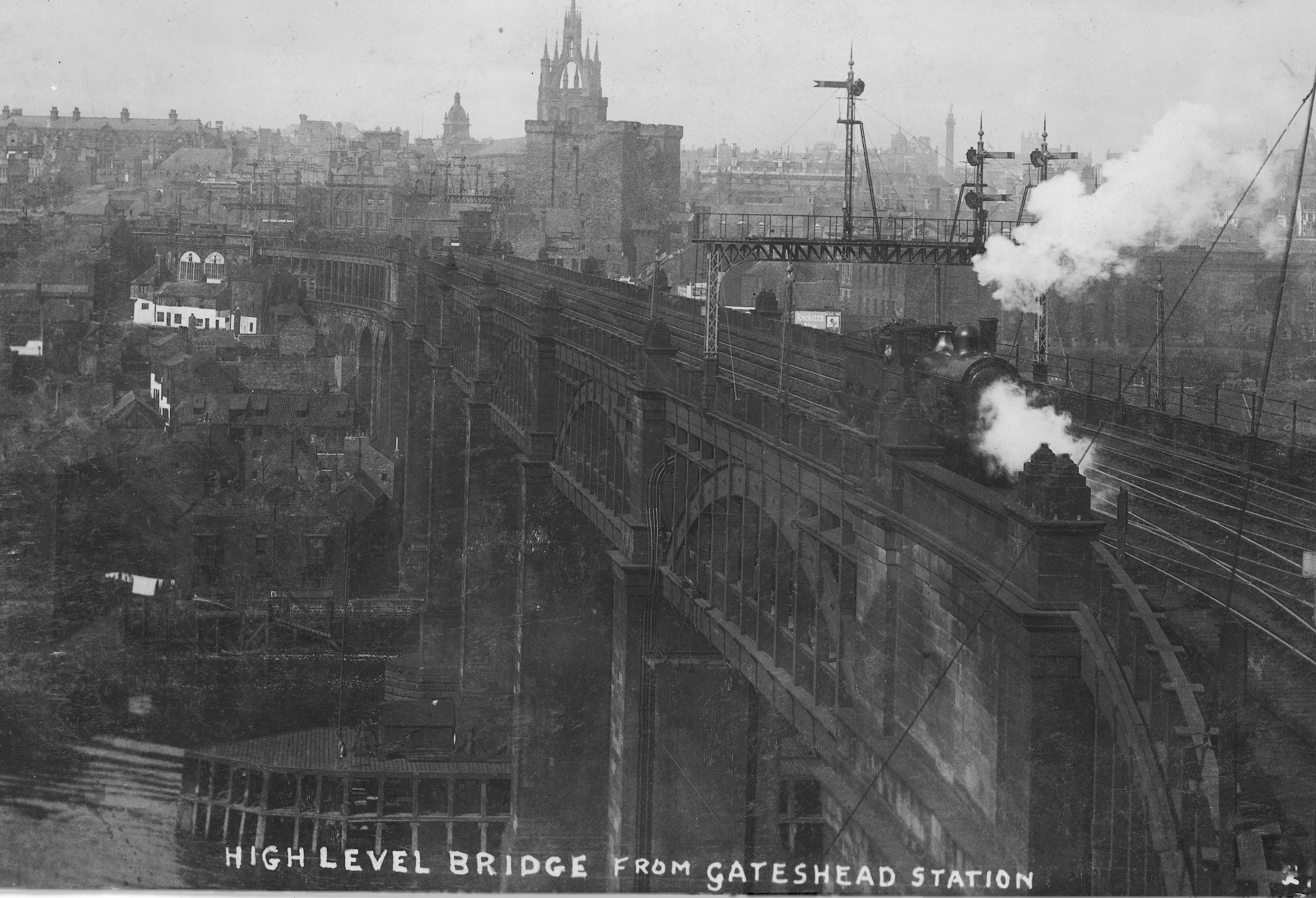
High Level Bridge from Gateshead

In 1922, trams were to start crossing the bridge, and the cast iron longitudinal members supporting the roadway were replaced with steel beams and a new deck was provided. In 1937 Newcastle City Council took over responsibility for maintenance of the road surface, but a 9-ton weight limit was imposed; this was increased to 10 tons in 1967.

Between 1955 and 1959, the timber deck of the rail level was replaced by steel, and ballasted track was substituted for the earlier way beam track structure, adding 150 tons of dead load to each span of the bridge.

In 1983 a further analysis of the capacity of the bridge led to the reduction of the weight limit to 7.5 tons. By this time rail vehicles of 100 tonnes gross laden weight were operating, and one of the three railway tracks was removed to reduce extreme loading on the structure.

== Listed status ==
In 1950, the High Level Bridge was classified as a Grade I listed structure.

== A second crossing ==
The High Level Bridge was an important node on the railway network, and as branch line passenger services and mineral traffic built up it became a bottleneck. This was exacerbated by the location of the main locomotive depot for Newcastle being at Gateshead; as many train services changed engines at Newcastle this generated a huge number of light engine movements to and from the depot across the bridge.

At the beginning of the twentieth century proposals were brought forward to build a second, rail-only bridge. This became the King Edward VII Bridge, located a few hundred yards to the west of the High Level Bridge. This started carrying traffic on 1 October 1906, having been inaugurated by the King on 10 July 1906. Trains from the southern and south-western districts generally crossed the Tyne on the new bridge, which carried four tracks. Through express passenger trains no longer had to reverse in Newcastle station, and where no engine change was required, a significant time saving was possible.

== Restoration ==
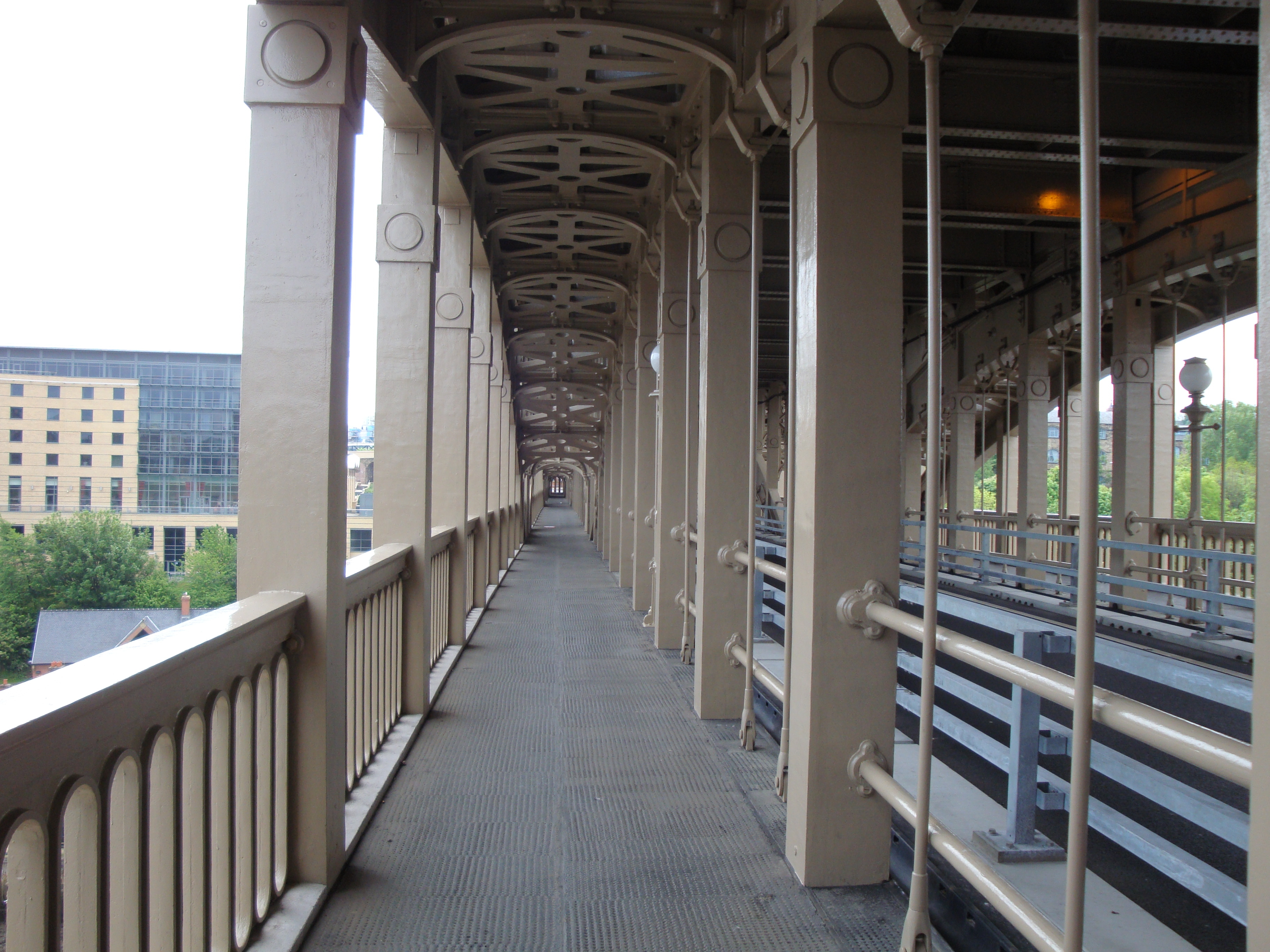
The bridge walkway after the restoration, facing south

View of road and pedestrian access after width and weight restrictions were imposed

To carry out work to ensure its long-term future the bridge was closed to road traffic in February 2005. Maintenance included replacement of timber supports beneath the road deck. The bridge re-opened on 2 June 2008 as severe cracks were found in some of its iron girders. In March 2006 the bridge's footpath, which was to have been kept open during the restoration project, was closed at the request of Network Rail due to vandalism and the increasing scale of required works.

Extra crash barriers on each side of the roadway were added leaving space for only one lane of traffic. Previously even double-deck buses had operated through the bridge in both directions.

Where the road deck met the land on the northern side of the river was inside the castle precinct, a complex multi-period archaeological site. Archaeological mitigation work, a standing building recording on the approach arches, and an excavation in advance of the piling required to strengthen the arches was carried out by AAG Archaeology.

== Present day ==
The road deck was re-opened only in a southbound (towards Gateshead) direction and carries only buses and taxis; the one-way operation is required because of width considerations after protection to the structural members was inserted. Pedestrians and cyclists use the bridge freely. Railway traffic continues in full use of the bridge, although the majority of mainline trains use the King Edward VII bridge for reasons of convenience.

== Notes ==
Next bridge upstream	River Tyne	Next bridge downstream
Queen Elizabeth II Metro Bridge; Tyne and Wear Metro	High Level Bridge, River Tyne; Grid reference NZ251636	Swing Bridge
