= King Edward VII Bridge =

Railway Bridge over the River Tyne, England

- King Edward VII Bridge, in 2026
- Coordinates: 54.9632°N 1.6162°W
- OS grid reference: NZ246632
- Carries: East Coast Main Line
- Crosses: River Tyne
- Locale: Tyneside
- Owner: Network Rail
- Maintained by: Network Rail
- Heritage status: Grade II listed
- Network Rail Bridge ID: ECM5-259
- Preceded by: Redheugh Bridge
- Followed by: Queen Elizabeth II Bridge

Characteristics
- Design: Truss bridge
- Material: Steel
- Pier construction: Sandstone; Granite
- Total length: 350.8 m (1,151 ft)
- Width: 15.3 m (50 ft)
- No. of spans: 4

Rail characteristics
- No. of tracks: 4
- Track gauge: 1,435 mm (4 ft 8 1/2 in)
- Electrified: 25 kV 50 Hz AC

History
- Designer: Charles A. Harrison
- Engineering design by: Charles A. Harrison
- Constructed by: Cleveland Bridge & Engineering Company
- Construction start: 29 July 1902
- Opened: 1 October 1906
- Inaugurated: 10 July 1906; by King Edward VII and Queen Alexandra

Location
- Interactive map of King Edward VII Bridge

The King Edward VII Bridge is a railway bridge spanning the River Tyne between Newcastle upon Tyne and Gateshead, in North East England. It is a Grade II listed structure. The King Edward VII bridge has been described as “Britain’s last great railway bridge”.

The bridge was designed and engineered by Charles A. Harrison, the Chief Civil Engineer of the North Eastern Railway, and built by the Cleveland Bridge & Engineering Company in Darlington. The bridge consists of four lattice steel spans resting on concrete piers. The total length of the bridge is 1,150 ft (350 m) and 112 ft (34 m) above high water mark. The total cost was over £500,000.

The bridge was opened by King Edward VII and Queen Alexandra on 10 July 1906, despite being still unfinished at this time. General traffic began using the bridge on 1 October 1906. Prior to its completion, to reach Newcastle railway station, trains used the older High Level Bridge and had to leave the station in the same direction they entered by reversing. The construction of the King Edward VII Bridge provided four more railway tracks and a direct line through the station, enabling trains to arrive or depart from either side, greatly easing congestion.

== History ==
=== Background ===
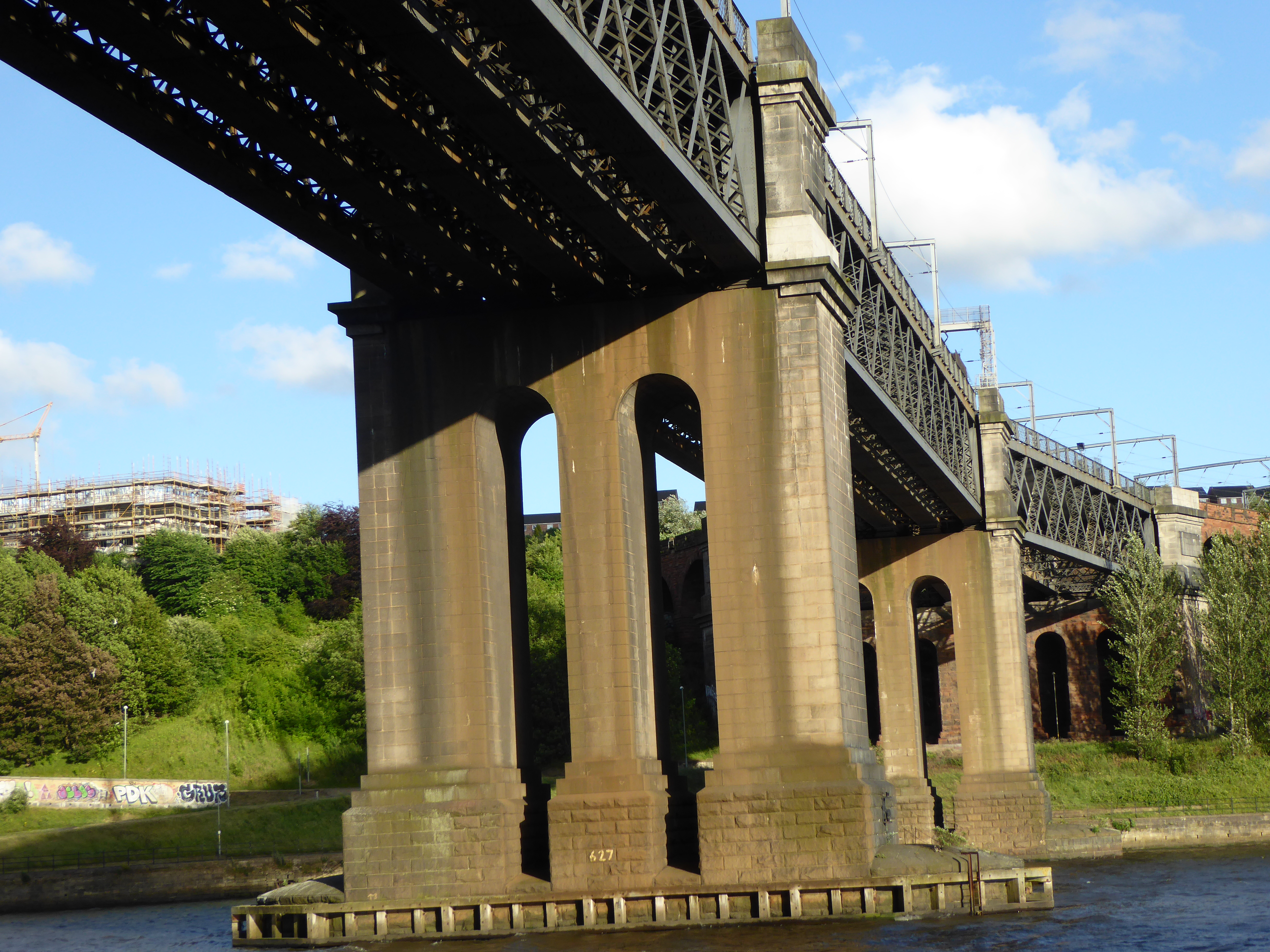
King Edward VII Bridge, in 2015

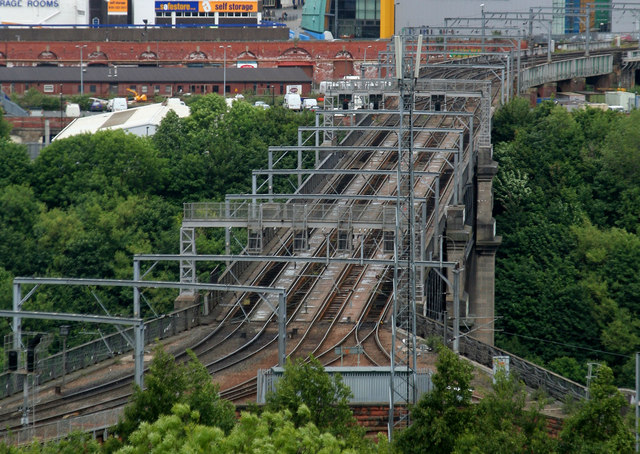
The tracks crossing the bridge

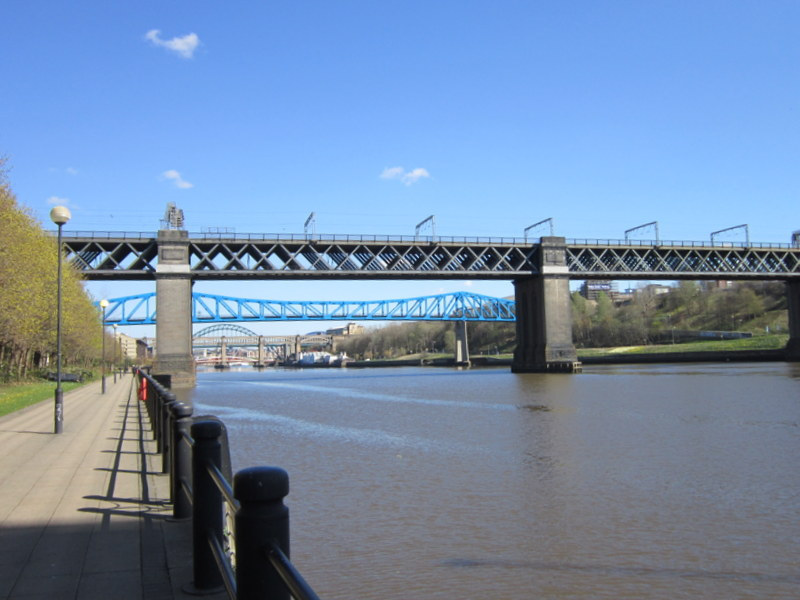
Side view

During 1849, the High Level Bridge, an elaborate twin-deck railway and road bridge built near the centre of Newcastle upon Tyne to allow traffic to cross the River Tyne, was officially opened by Queen Victoria. Once the bridge was completed, trains could reach the recently built Newcastle railway station. However, this arrangement was not ideal in practice as, in order to depart the station back across the High Level Bridge, trains had to reverse out of the station, a relatively tedious process.

During the following 50 years, Britain's railway network and the number of passengers had expanded greatly. By the 1890s, the sheer amount of traffic crossing the High Level Bridge, roughly 800 train and light engine movements every day, had become a major concern of the NER, who operated services across it. It had become clear to many that the construction of a second railway bridge over the Tyne was now desperately needed to take the pressure off the High Level Bridge.

Options considered included the building of a new bridge between Dunston and Elswick, or between Heaton and Pelaw, as well as the widening of the existing High Level Bridge to carrying six tracks instead of four. By 1898, the company had settled on its preferred option of building an additional bridge on the present site; during that year, plans for the proposed bridge were revealed to the public in the Evening Chronicle. On 9 August 1899, the updated North Eastern Railway Act 1899 (62 & 63 Vict. c. ccxxx), which included the construction of another railway bridge over the Tyne among its provisions, received royal assent.

In its original proposed form, the new bridge followed a functional design developed by Charles Augustus Harrison, chief engineer of the NER. Harrison was the nephew of Thomas Elliot Harrison who, together with the pioneering railway engineer Robert Stephenson, had previously produced plans for the existing High Level Bridge. The early design of the bridge called for the river to be crossed by two spans, supported by girder lattices, that would join up with several land approach arches; however, it had to be redesigned when the presence of abandoned coal workings were discovered at both ends of the intended bridge.

The revised design remained a lattice girder bridge that carried four railway tracks, but featured a total of four spans over the River Tyne. These spans were supported by five sandstone piers, which were decorated with pairs of cutaway arches, three of which are in the river itself. The northern approach featured a total of ten arches, which were used to house workshops.

=== Construction ===
On 13 February 1902, the contract for the bridge's construction was awarded to the Darlington-based Cleveland Bridge & Engineering Company; the programme was internally financed entirely by the NER. Excluding land purchases, it cost roughly £500,000 to construct, which has been estimated as being around £55 million in 2016 prices. On 29 July 1902, work on digging out the foundations for the structure commenced at the Newcastle end.

The foundations under the three large river piers were laid by divers working in caissons (large, watertight chambers) underwater in compressed air. This was known to be dangerous work even for the time; as such, no one under the age of 40 could be employed in this capacity and each man spent just four hours per shift in the caissons. Nevertheless, one man is recorded as having died, and another as having become seriously ill, that had been attributed to the effects of working in the compressed air conditions. Other workers became ill as a result of breathing in sulphuretted hydrogen, which seeped from the coal seams that the foundations were dug into.

Rock was excavated from inside the caissons by blasting; the workers took refuge in an air-locked chamber in the access shaft while charges were being detonated. Once excavation work was finished, the caissons were filled with roughly 28,450 tonnes of concrete and piers constructed on top of them. Each pier, composed of sandstone and granite masonry, was built in a triple-shaft arrangement, being 6.6 by 9.3 m (22 by 31 ft) for the side-shafts and 4.1 by 9.3 m (13 by 31 ft) for the central shaft.

Once the piers were finished, the spans were assembled in situ on timber trestles. Those spans that were above the river were erected one at a time; during this process, half of the river's width would be closed to traffic for safety reasons. The bridge deck consists of steel lattice girders of the double Warren truss type, being 8.2 m (27 ft) deep overall at 3.35 m (11.0 ft) spacing. The deck itself is 15.2 m (50 ft) wide, while the total weight of the steel work is estimated to be around 5,820 tonnes.

Perhaps one of the more notable facilities used in the construction of the bridge was an elevated cableway which ran across the river. At the time, it was the largest cableway in the world, having a length of 463.5 m (1,521 ft) and being suspended 61 m (200 ft) above the Tyne at high water. A 7.6 cm (3.0 in) diameter steel cable was used to convey in excess of 23,000 tonnes of material. Following the completion of the bridge, the cableway was dismantled and the cable was transported to the Swan Hunter and Wigham Richardson shipyard in Wallsend, where it was reused in the launch of the ocean liner RMS Mauretania.

Although the structure was not even fully completed, on 10 July 1906, the bridge was officially opened by King Edward VII from a temporary platform at the Gateshead end of the bridge). It was decided to name the structure after the reigning monarch, hence its name of the King Edward VII Bridge. According to the Evening Chronicle, the bridge was the first to carry four main tracks, albeit the spaces between the tracks have occasionally proved to be too narrow for some modern, high-speed trains.

On 27 September 1906, the effectiveness of the structure was demonstrated via the running of ten locomotives, weighing around 100 tons each, coupled together in two sets of five, over the bridge at a leisurely speed of 6–8 mph (10–13 km/h). These locomotives were intentionally running side-by-side in order to exert the maximum possible strain upon each of the bridge's girders.

=== Operating life ===
On 1 October 1906, the King Edward VII Bridge was opened to general traffic. Shortly thereafter, those trains using the East Coast Main Line route switched to accessing Newcastle Station via the new crossing, while trains bound for Sunderland and Middlesbrough continued to use the High Level Bridge. During March 1907, a freight line to Dunston was opened to the east of the main line.

During 1908, Harrison himself reportedly commented of the bridge that "... there was nothing very striking in the design of the bridge except that it was rather larger in span and width and greater in height above the river than most bridges that had been erected in the last few years". He did, however, think that the caissons of the structure were the largest that had been sunk since those used for the Forth Bridge.

During 1959, the locomotive shed at Greenesfield, Gateshead was closed; this closure allowed for the simplification of the track layout across the bridge; most notable among this work was the reduction from four lines to three across the south-western approach to the bridge.

Between 1976 and 1991, British Rail electrified most of the East Coast Main Line. As part of this programme, the bridge was equipped with overhead wiring gantries.

In 1994, the bridge was Grade II listed.

Next bridge upstream	River Tyne	Next bridge downstream
Redheugh Bridge; A189 road	King Edward VII Bridge; Grid reference NZ246632	Queen Elizabeth II Metro Bridge; Tyne and Wear Metro
Next railway bridge upstream	River Tyne	Next railway bridge downstream
Scotswood Railway Bridge; Disused (now carries water and gas mains)	King Edward VII Bridge; Grid reference NZ246632	Queen Elizabeth II Metro Bridge; Tyne and Wear Metro
