= Sunniside, Gateshead =

Village in Tyne and Wear, England

Coordinates: 54.926°N 1.682°W

Sunniside
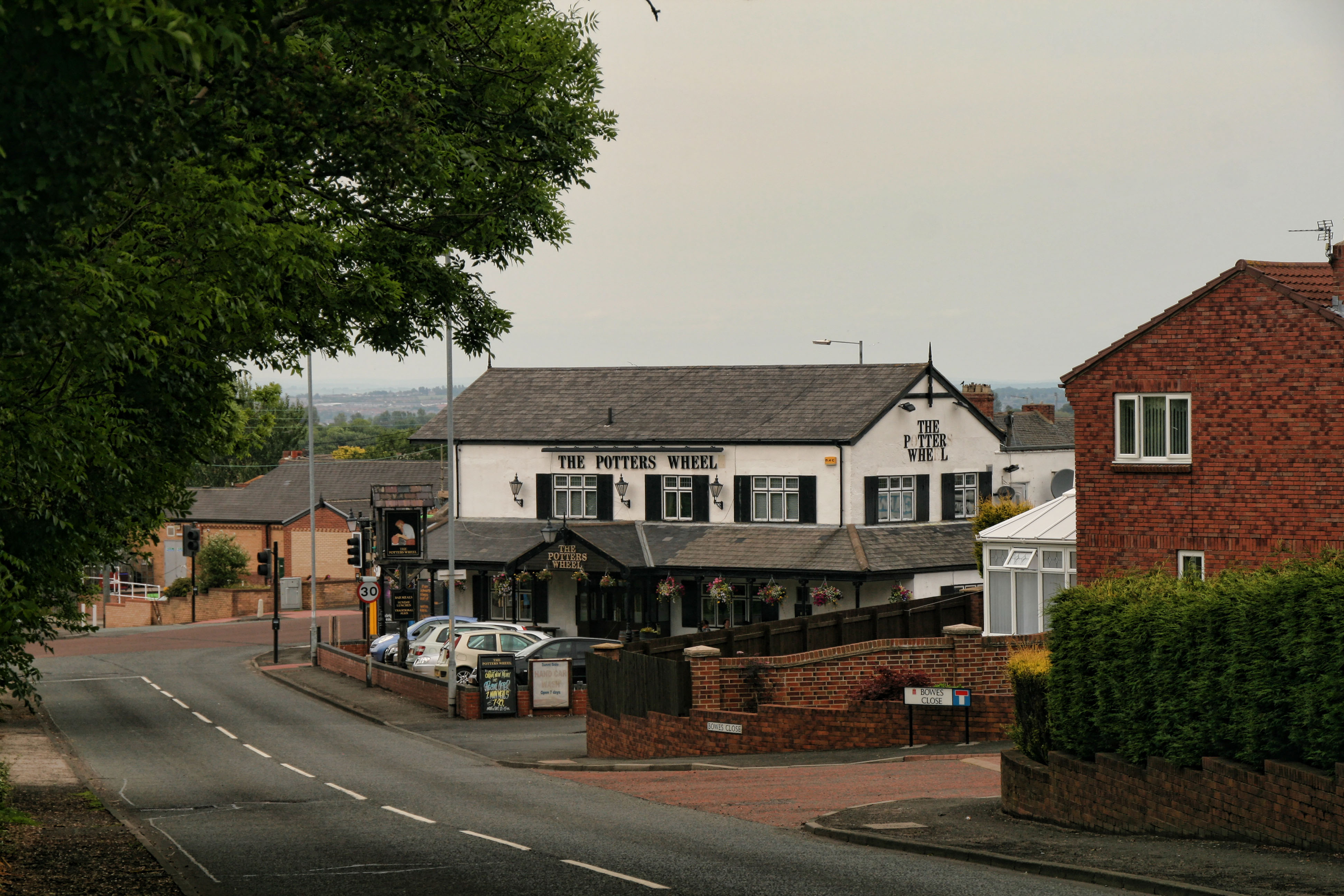
- The Potters Wheel

- Location within Tyne and Wear
- Population: 8,313 (2011 Census data for Whickham South and Sunniside)
- OS grid reference: NZ204590
- Metropolitan borough: Gateshead
- Metropolitan county: Tyne and Wear
- Region: North East
- Country: England
- Sovereign state: United Kingdom
- Post town: Newcastle upon Tyne
- Postcode district: NE16
- Dialling code: 0191
- Police: Northumbria
- Fire: Tyne and Wear
- Ambulance: North East
- UK Parliament: Gateshead Central and Whickham

Sunniside is a village in the Metropolitan Borough of Gateshead, which is located around 5.5 miles (9 km) from Newcastle upon Tyne. Prior to the creation of the county of Tyne and Wear in 1974, it was part of Whickham Urban District, which in turn formed a part of County Durham. Sunniside has a busy Front Street, with a collection of pubs, shops, and amenities. The village is surrounded mainly by farmland, with plantations of trees to the east, whilst also neighbouring the villages of Byermoor, Marley Hill and Whickham.

The village is mostly housing, with older terraced properties situated near to the shops, and large housing estates built from the 1960s onward radiating from this area. It has a large park to the north of the village, next to Burnthouse Lane.

Attractions near to the village include Beamish Museum and Tanfield Railway.

The A692 road runs directly through the centre of the village and is used by many transport companies as a direct route to the town of Consett: this road carries some of the heaviest traffic through the borough of Gateshead daily.

There have been a lot of private housing developments in the village of Sunniside, between 2017 and 2021, leading to increases in population and traffic.

Sunniside has one of the highest rates of community council tax in the country (including London)

== Demography ==
The data below shows that 51.4% of the population in Whickham South and Sunniside are female, which is above the national average (50.8%), as well as being above average within the Metropolitan Borough of Gateshead (51.1%).

A total of 2.6% of the population were from a black, Asian and minority ethnic (BAME) group in Whickham South and Sunniside. This figure is significantly lower than that of the average in the Metropolitan Borough of Gateshead (3.7%), as well as the national average (14.6%).

Data from the Office for National Statistics found that the average life expectancy in Whickham South and Sunniside is 82.3 years for men, and 86.2 years for women. These statistics compare very favourably, when compared to the average life expectancy in the North East of England, of 77.4 and 81.4 years, for men and women respectively.

Car ownership is significantly higher than the average within the Metropolitan Borough of Gateshead (63.5%), as well as the national average (74.2%), with a total of 82.2% of households in Whickham South and Sunniside having access to at least one car.

Demography (data from 2011 Census)
Demographic	% of population Whickham South and Sunniside	% of population Gateshead	% of population England
Total	8,313	200,214	53,012,456
Male	48.6%	48.9%	49.2%
Female	51.4%	51.1%	50.8%
BAME	2.6%	3.7%	14.6%
Age 65+	20.7%	17.6%	16.4%

== Education ==
In terms of primary education, students attend the nearby Clover Hill Primary School Fellside Primary School and Washingwell Primary School in Whickham, as well as Sacred Heart Primary School in Byermoor.

Whickham School and Sports College provides secondary education in the area, along with Emmanuel College in Lobley Hill and St. Thomas More Catholic School in Blaydon.

== Governance ==
Whickham South and Sunniside is a local council ward in the Metropolitan Borough of Gateshead. This ward covers an area of around 5.6 square miles (14.5 km^{2}), and has a population of 8,313.

As of September 2020, the ward is served by three councillors: John McClury, Jonathan Charles Wallace and Marilynn Ord.

The village is in the parliamentary constituency of Gateshead Central and Whickham, and is served by Labour Party Member of Parliament (MP), Mark Ferguson.

Gateshead Council Local Elections 2019: Whickham South and Sunniside
Candidate	Political party	Total votes	% of votes
Jonathan Charles Wallace	Liberal Democrats	1,917	72.9%
Judith Turner	Labour and Co-operative	479	18.2%
Perry Wilson	Conservative	232	8.8%

== Transport ==
=== Air ===
The nearest airport is Newcastle International Airport, which is around 10 miles (16 km) away by road. Teesside International Airport and Carlisle Lake District Airport are around 37 and 54 miles (60 and 87 km) by road respectively.

=== Bus ===
Sunniside is served by eight buses per hour to Newcastle upon Tyne and Stanley, with six buses per hour to Gateshead and three buses per hour to Consett, as well as a half-hourly service to Whickham and Metrocentre.

=== Rail ===
The nearest National Rail stations are located at MetroCentre and Newcastle.

=== Road ===
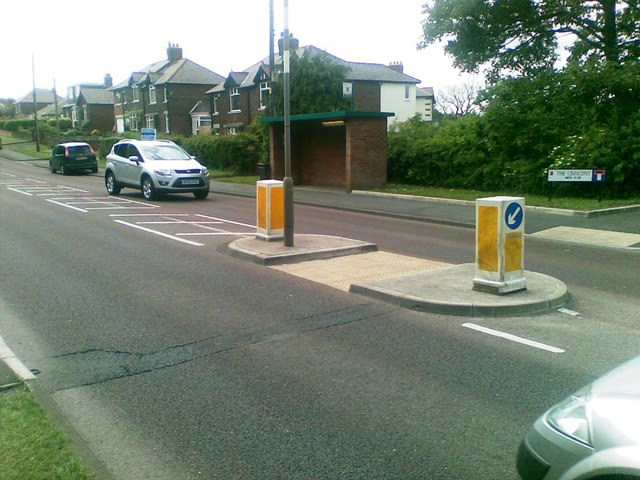
A692 at Sunnside

The main road through the village is the A692, which runs 13.6 miles (21.9 km) from the A68 at Castleside to the A1 at Lobley Hill.
