= Peter Walters (footballer) =

English footballer (born 1952)

Personal information
- Full name: Peter Louis Walters
- Date of birth: 8 June 1952
- Place of birth: Whickham, Tyne & Wear, England
- Position: Goalkeeper

Youth career
- Middlesbrough

Senior career*
Years	Team	Apps	(Gls)
1970–1972	Hull City	2	(0)
1972	→ Darlington (loan)	16	(0)
197?–1978	Corby Town		
1978–1980	Bedford Town		
1980–1981	Kettering Town	38	(0)
1981–1982	Scarborough	24	(0)
- * Club domestic league appearances and goals

Peter Louis Walters (born 8 June 1952) is an English former footballer who played as a goalkeeper in the Football League for Hull City and Darlington, in the Southern League for Corby Town and Bedford Town, for whom he made 83 appearances in all competitions, and in the Alliance Premier League for Kettering Town and Scarborough. He began his career as a youngster with Middlesbrough.
