= Marley Hill =

Village in Tyne and Wear, United Kingdom

Coordinates: 54.91729°N 1.68217°W

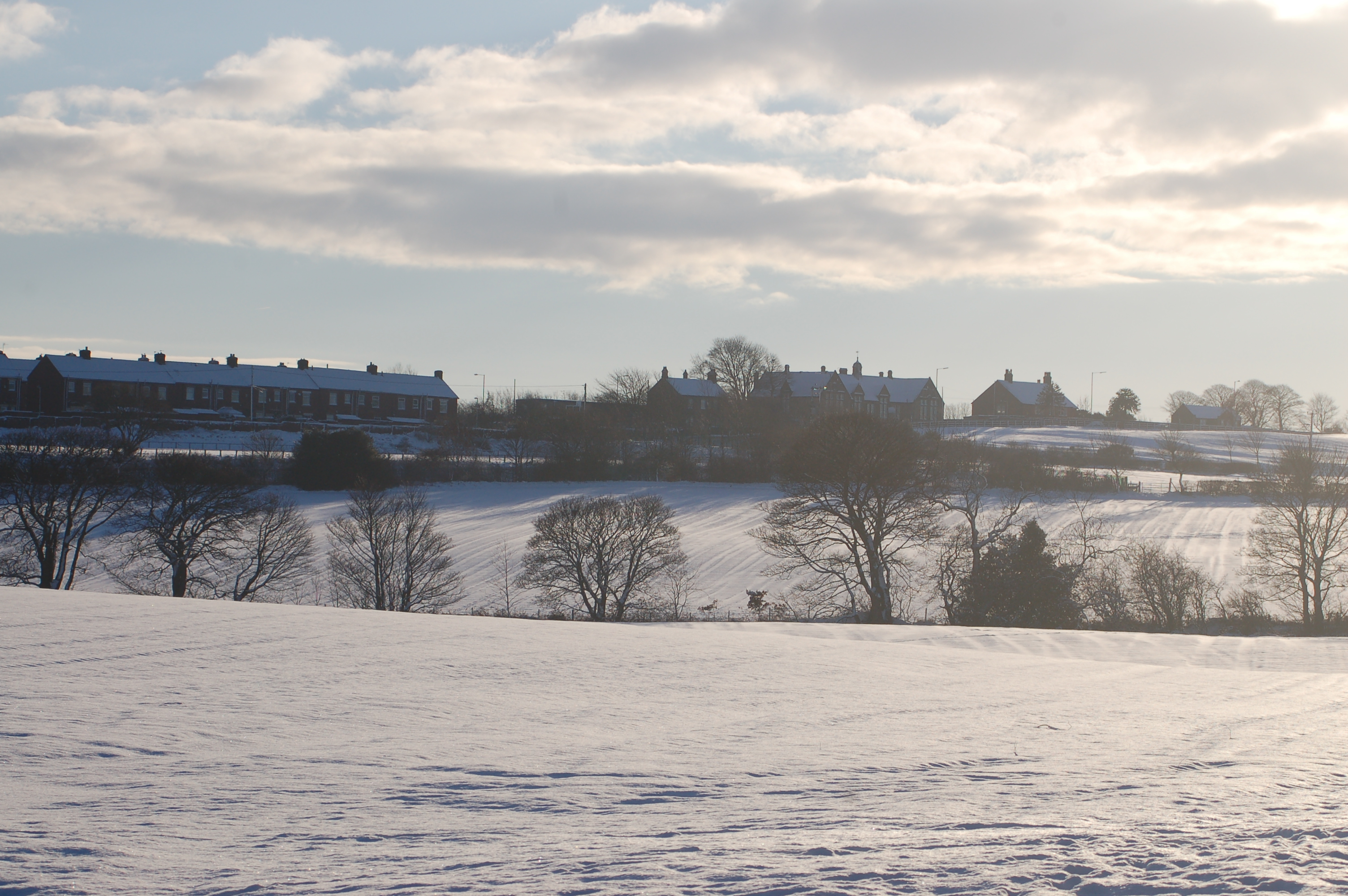
Cuthbert Street and Marley Hill School from the north

Marley Hill is a former colliery village about six miles to the south west of Gateshead, near the border between Tyne and Wear and County Durham. It has been part of the Metropolitan Borough of Gateshead since 1974. Prior to this it was part of Whickham Urban District. It lies within the Whickham South & Sunniside electoral ward of the Blaydon parliamentary constituency.

Neighbouring towns and villages include Burnopfield (2 miles away); Sunniside, Gateshead (about half a mile away); Byermoor (just under a mile away). Marley Hill, Sunniside, Burnopfield and Byermoor all share Whickham's "NE16" postcode prefix, despite Burnopfield sitting just over the border in County Durham. The actual area considered to be Marley Hill for postal purposes etc. is actually much larger than it would first appear, as there were originally more houses to the south and south east, nearer the colliery. Birkheads Cottages and Hedley Hall Farm are the farthest properties away from the village itself, these being about a mile to the south-east. Hedley Hall Farm's address is anomalously listed as "Hedley Lane, Sunniside", despite actually being further away from Sunniside than Birkheads Cottages, whose addresses read "Birkheads Lane, Marley Hill".

== Housing ==
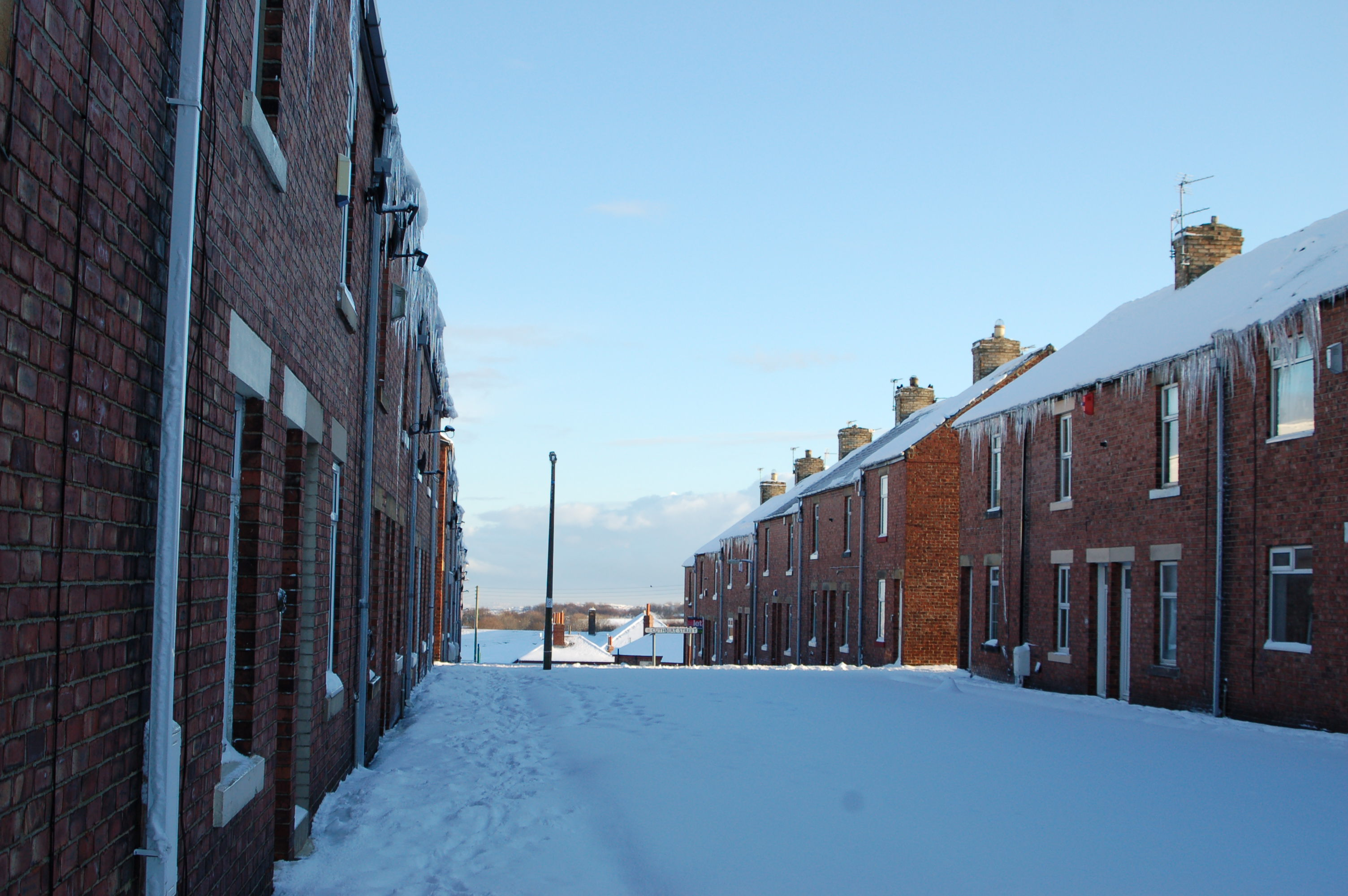
Cuthbert Street and Aged Miner's Cottages

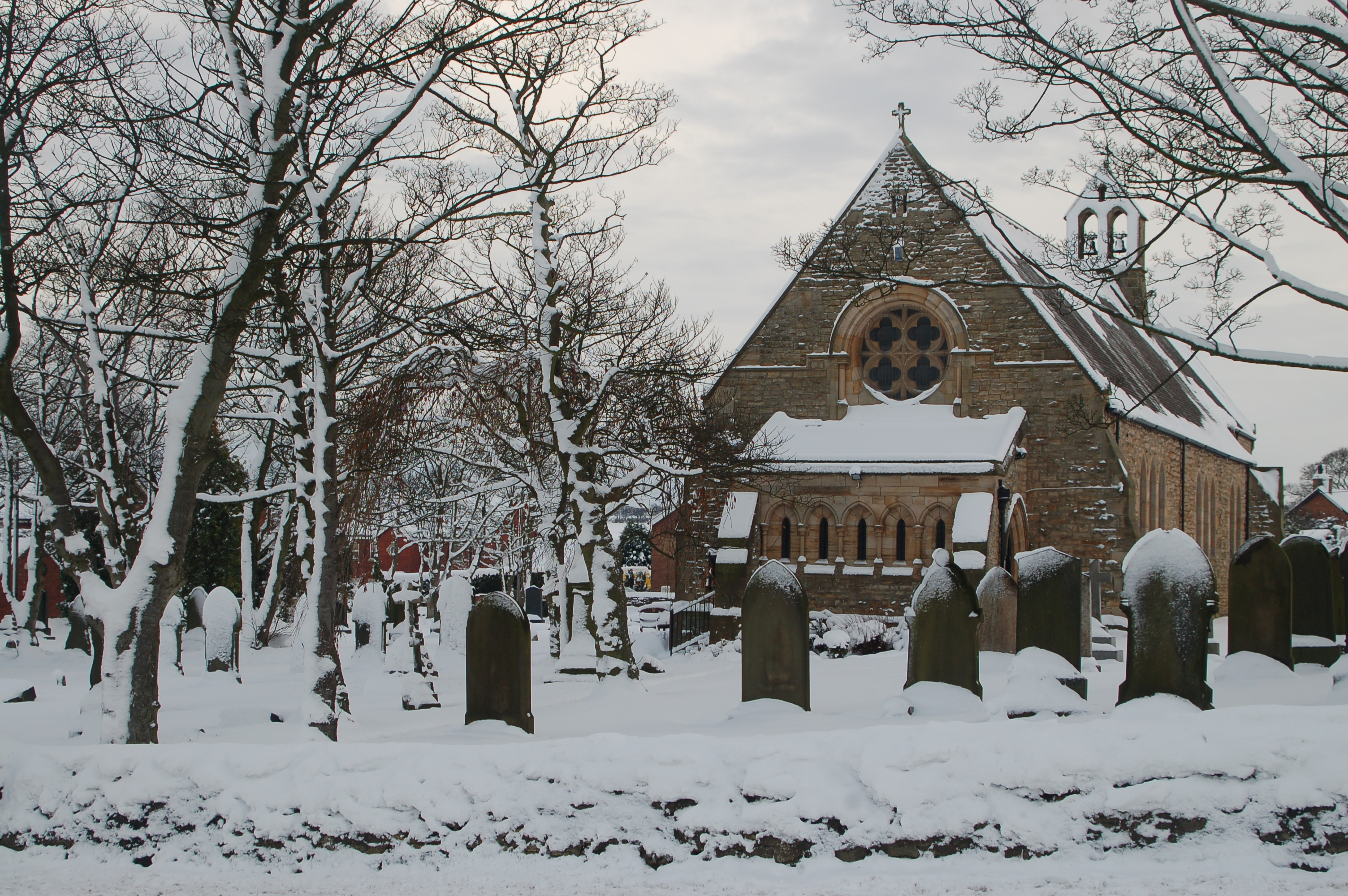
St. Cuthbert's Church, Marley Hill

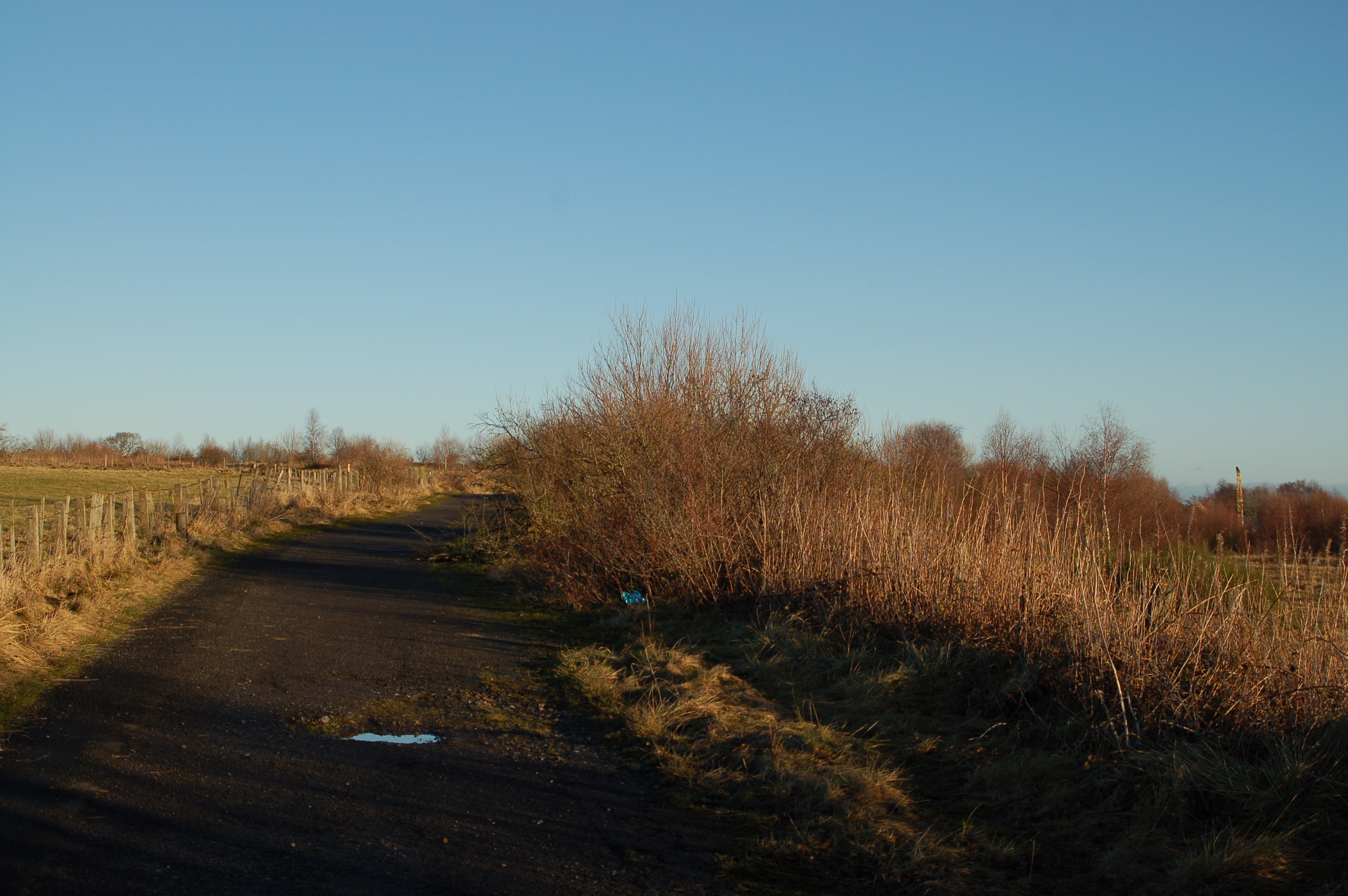
St. Cuthbert's Road, looking towards the site of Marley Hill Colliery

The village consists of several rows of terraced houses, along with a number of detached and semi-detached properties. The oldest existing properties are the former vicarage, the school house, three large detached houses on St. Cuthbert's Road, two stone-built cottages (accessed by a lane leading off to the north-east from St. Cuthbert's Road) and the five rows of houses which form Glamis Terrace, Cuthbert Street and Church Street. The majority of the properties on Cuthbert Street and Church street were built as two up-two downs, and at one time had outside toilets and tin baths which would have been placed in front of the fire. During the 1960s, the houses were modernised and had indoor bathroom/toilets installed. Some of the outside toilets with their adjoining coal houses remain, but a number have been demolished, or have had the toilet removed and are used as sheds. The houses on Glamis Terrace were intended for colliery officials, and are therefore fewer in number and considerably larger than the others, with gardens at both the front and rear. It is named Glamis because the Bowes-Lyons, the Earls of Strathmore, who were ancestors of the Queen (Glamis Castle was the childhood home of the Queen Mother) owned the colliery and the surrounding land, including the Gibside estate. Church Street and Cuthbert Street are named after St. Cuthbert's Church, which stands at the corner of St. Cuthbert's Road, opposite the former Miners Welfare Institute (now a community centre housing a nursery and a performing arts school) and the aged miner's cottages.

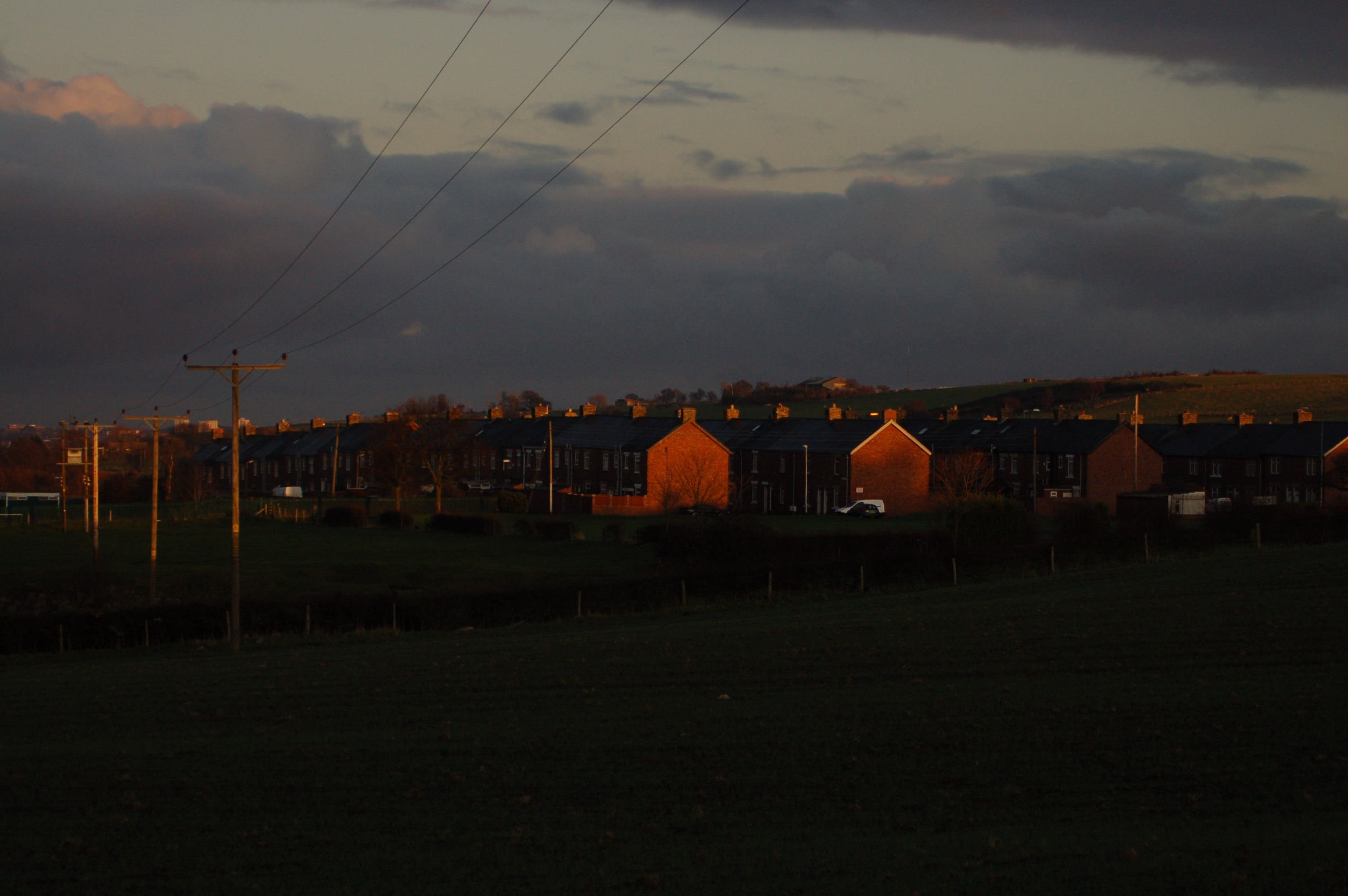
Cuthbert Street and Church Street from the south

Church Street is part of the A692 to Consett and forms the main road through the village. The south side of Church Street differs slightly in that the houses all have front gardens, and (with the exception of the first house on the row) are slightly larger, with three bedrooms, and the presence of extra chimney pots indicating that they have additional fireplaces in the kitchen and one of the rear bedrooms. These larger houses also mostly have two narrow windows side by side in the living room and front bedroom, although some have been altered and had larger single windows installed. The bathrooms of these properties occupy a small extension on the back of the house, as opposed to the smaller properties, whose bathrooms were created by partitioning the rear bedroom. Aside from this, the houses are similar in appearance to those on the north side of the road and on Cuthbert Street, which have single windows, and fireplaces in the front rooms only. The only house on these three rows which differs significantly from the others is the first house on the north side of Church street, which is the only three-bedroom property on that side and at a glance appears to be two houses which have been knocked through into one property, but was actually just built slightly larger. There is no vehicular access to the front of the properties on Cuthbert Street, with a grassed area occupying the space between the two rows of houses.

The village also had a number of prefab houses, which occupied the large grassed area at the top of Cuthbert Street. These were known as Noble Street and Raby Street. They seem to have been built at some time in the 1950s, and can be seen on the 1960 and 1966 OS maps, but were demolished in 1968 and no longer show on the 1970 map. The section of road which continues past the rear of Cuthbert Street is actually the eastern end of Raby Street. The junction where Noble Street began can be clearly seen at the point where two concrete bollards now stand opposite the top of Cuthbert Street. During very dry weather, the outline of the road becomes clearly visible as a wide strip of lighter coloured grass, running in a westerly direction from the bollards towards Blackamoor Hill. The original concrete surface of Raby Street is still in situ, and runs parallel to Noble Street, beside the hedge. In the exceptionally dry summer of 2018, the outlines of these long-demolished properties reappeared after 40 years. Large numbers of this type of house were built all over the country as a temporary measure to replace housing stock lost during German bombing raids, the vast majority being demolished once replacement housing had been built, but some remain. Examples can be seen locally on Valley Drive in Swalwell, and on The Drive and Southfield Road near the junction with Washingwell lane on the Watergate Estate in Whickham. The field adjacent to the area formerly occupied by the prefabs is now used for cattle grazing, but was at some point used as a rubbish tip, evidence of which can be seen in the form of the old bottles, jars and clay pipes which can sometimes be found poking out of the ground, as well as the presence in the soil of large quantities of ash from coal fires. To increase wartime coal production, the government introduced opencast mining all over the country. One such mine was located in the field immediately to the west the rubbish tip, and appears on the 1951 OS map.

The newer properties in the village are those in the St. Cuthbert's Park estate and Sandygate Mews, which are accessed from St. Cuthbert's road. St. Cuthbert's Park consists of a mixture of detached and semi-detached properties, and was built in the 1990s, as was Sandygate Mews. Sandygate Mews consists of five large detached properties built on the site of a former market garden. These, along with the vicarage and The Grange, which stands across St. Cuthbert's Road from the church, are some of the largest houses in the village. The former church hall opposite the entrance to Sandygate Mews has also been converted into a house, and there are another two large properties just to the south of the school. One of these is relatively new, while the other one, Redlands, appears on the 1921 OS map. A building marked "mission room" on the site of the church hall also appears on this map. The building which presently occupies the site does not appear to be old enough to have been built before 1921, but was presumably built to replace an earlier structure of similar dimensions. After falling into disuse, the hall stood empty for a number of years, before finally being bought by a property developer. Although the general outline of the structure has not been altered, its conversion into a home has otherwise rendered it considerably different in appearance.

As of 2018, the original school building is being converted into two properties after standing empty for eight years, while the more modern extension and portacabins that housed the main hall, some additional classrooms and the kitchens have been demolished and 22 houses are being built on the site of these and the former playing field. These will be known as Marley View.

== Sport, leisure, transport and amenities ==
Sports and leisure facilities consist of a small park with play equipment and basketball hoops situated at the bottom of Cuthbert Street, along with two tennis courts and a bowling green behind the aged miner's cottages, and a football pitch with a small hut containing a changing room to the rear of Cuthbert Street. There was a cricket ground on the south side of the road, just past Redlands, but this disappeared some time in the 1950s. There are also a number of allotments, some beside the road at the top of Church Street, and more occupying the land between the rear of Glamis Terrace and St. Cuthbert's Park. The only shop in the village is The Crafts House, a gift and craft shop situated at the top of Church Street, opposite the allotments. This building served as the post office for a time, after the closure of the post office at Old Marley Hill. Although Sunniside and Burnopfield are the nearest shops where groceries can be bought, a mobile shop operating out of a converted police incident support vehicle served Marley Hill and Byermoor up until around the end of 2011. This also served the Lintz Estate in Burnopfield and was mainly patronised by some of the more elderly residents. The Co-op, post office, and other shops at Sunniside are also within easy walking distance. Marley Hill has never had a pub, the nearest pubs being in Sunniside and Burnopfield, and the only licensed premises in the village is the community centre. The community centre is still referred to as the "choot" (a contraction of institute) by some of the older residents, and the main hall serves as the village's polling station during local and general elections. There is a post box on St. Cuthbert's Road, another outside the shop and a public telephone box outside the community centre.

The primary school was opened in August 1895 by Sir Charles Palmer, the MP for Jarrow (who had at one time been the manager of the colliery, becoming a partner in 1842), and finally closed over a century later at the beginning of the 2010 Christmas Holidays. At the time of writing the school buildings remain in situ. They are still owned by Gateshead Council and there have been calls to ensure that they are retained for public use. The Sacred Heart R.C. school in the neighbouring village of Byermoor was also under threat of closure, with the intention that the pupils would join those from Marley Hill at other schools in the area, mainly Clover Hill and Washingwell primaries in Whickham, although this decision was subsequently reversed. Prior to closure, two wooden-bodied mine tubs from the colliery stood outside the front of the school for many years. These had gradually fallen into a state of disrepair, and were subsequently removed for restoration. This having been completed, they were unveiled during a small ceremony on 6 October 2011 by Gateshead's Mayor, Councillor Joe Mitchison, in a new position on the grassed area in front of the aged miner's cottages, with the area's three Liberal Democrat councillors (who had secured the funding to have them restored) in attendance. The event was recorded by Councillor Jonathan Wallace, and the footage uploaded to YouTube. The sound quality on the video is affected as a result of the prevailing westerly winds which frequently buffet the village due to its exposed location.

The village is served by several bus routes, with Go North East service 6 connecting it with Newcastle via Whickham and the MetroCentre, and Durham via a change at Stanley. This service is replaced by service 6A on evenings and Sundays. Prior to the introduction of the 6 and 6A, connections to the MetroCentre were via services 43 and 44, which also provided a direct route to Durham. Services X70 and X71 from Consett also serve the village, reaching Newcastle via Gateshead. Service 70 originally replaced these two services on evenings and Sundays, but has been discontinued, with service X71 now running seven days a week. Prior to the opening of the new transport interchange at the Metrocentre (which saw a number of services that reached Newcastle via Dunston Bank or Lobley Hill and Gateshead replaced by routes using the new facility) and Go North East's introduction of branded routes in 2004, stops in the village were served for many years by services 705-8, X36, 794, 933 and 770. The latter featured on the "100 Years of British Buses" series of stamps issued by Royal Mail in 2001. The only services which survived this change were services 933, which is a twice daily works service between Rowlands Gill and the Team Valley Trading Estate, and service 794 between Stanley and the government office complex at Longbenton: these run through the village in the morning, with a return journey in the evening. Although the Department of Social Security technically ceased to exist in 2001 (with the site now being jointly occupied by its replacement, the Department for Work and Pensions and HM Revenue and Customs (HMRC), it is still stated as "DSS Longbenton" on the timetable. As of August 2011, this service continues to Balliol Business Park, where HMRC have more offices. There are three bus stops for Newcastle-bound services: one near Longfield Farm, one opposite the allotments, and one at the bottom of Church Street, by the aged miner's cottages. There were four on the opposite side of the road, one outside the church, one opposite the shop, one outside the school and one near the farm. Both stops near the farm are seldom used due to their isolated location, and the stop outside the school became redundant with the closure of the school. The busy nature of the road necessitated a crossing patrol for the children, and a Lollipop lady was stationed near the shop. This also became unnecessary after the school closed.

== Old Marley Hill, collieries, railways and associated industry ==
Marley Hill Colliery and the adjoining coke works were situated in the area known as Old Marley Hill, further along St. Cuthbert's Road (which is closed to vehicles beyond a large metal gate just past St. Cuthbert's Park), and at one time most of the village, including houses, a shop, the original post office and two Chapels (Wesleyan and Primitive Methodist, the latter being situated at the end of one of the rows of colliery houses, reputedly earning it the nickname "Ranter's Row") was centred around the colliery itself. There was also a row of very basic houses which was originally called Fen House Row, after a large house which stood in the field behind them, but came to be known simply as "The Hole" or "The Valley". Heading towards the pit, these were on the right hand side of St. Cuthbert's Road, just beyond the gate. The houses backed onto the steep hillside along the pit road, and some of them were flattened by a landslide around the turn of the 20th century. The rest were demolished in 1920. There were also three terraces nearer the A6076 which runs from Sunniside to Stanley; Bowes Terrace, Gibraltar Row, and Marley Hill Terrace. These were known collectively as Andrews Houses. Bowes terrace is visible on the 1938 OS map, but appears to have been demolished by 1951. Gibraltar Row and Marley Hill terrace last appear on the 1966 map but some of the houses were certainly still extant as late as 1973, albeit in a derelict condition, as they appear in the background of a photograph taken that year.

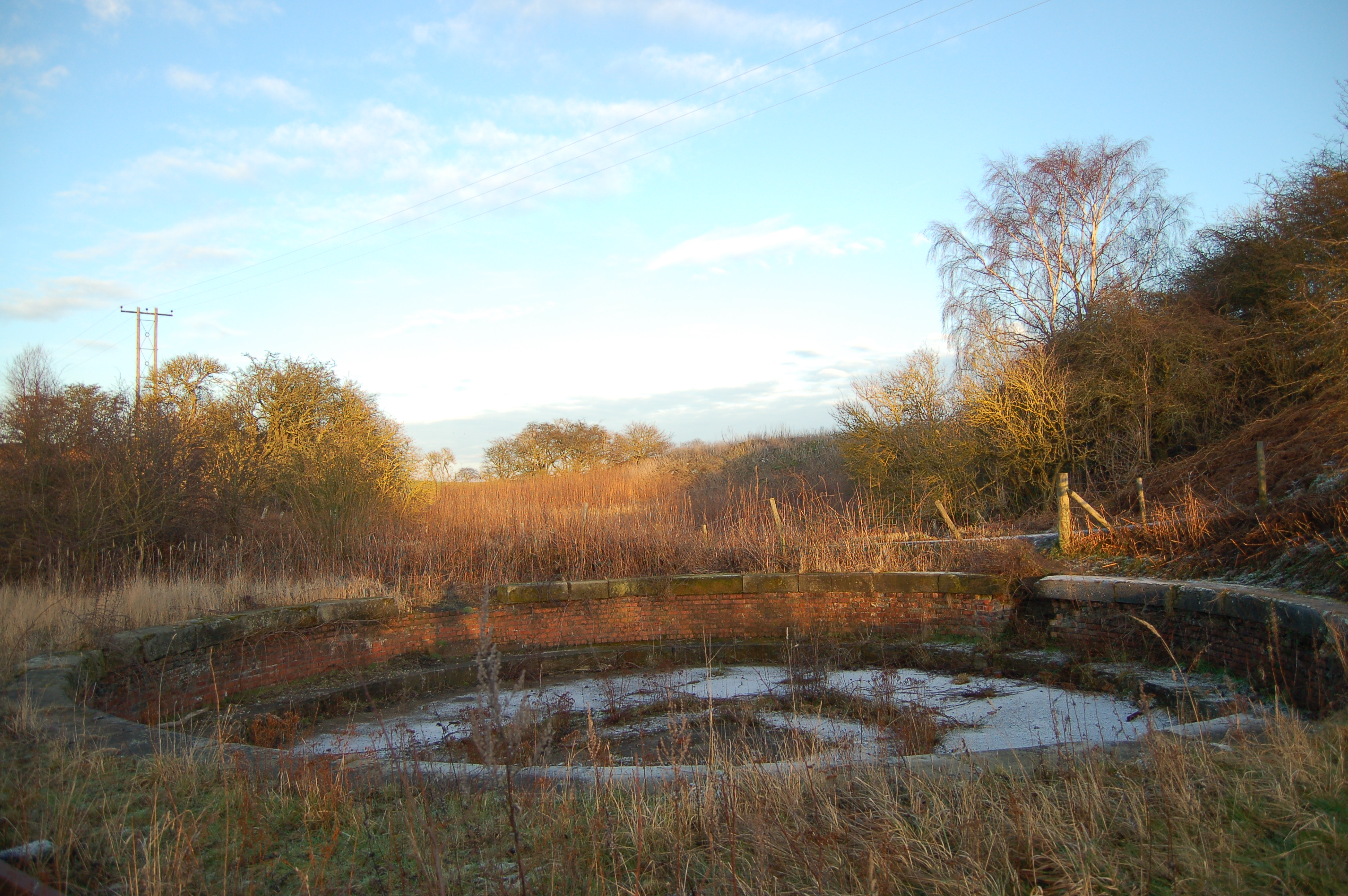
Bowes Bridge Turntable Pit

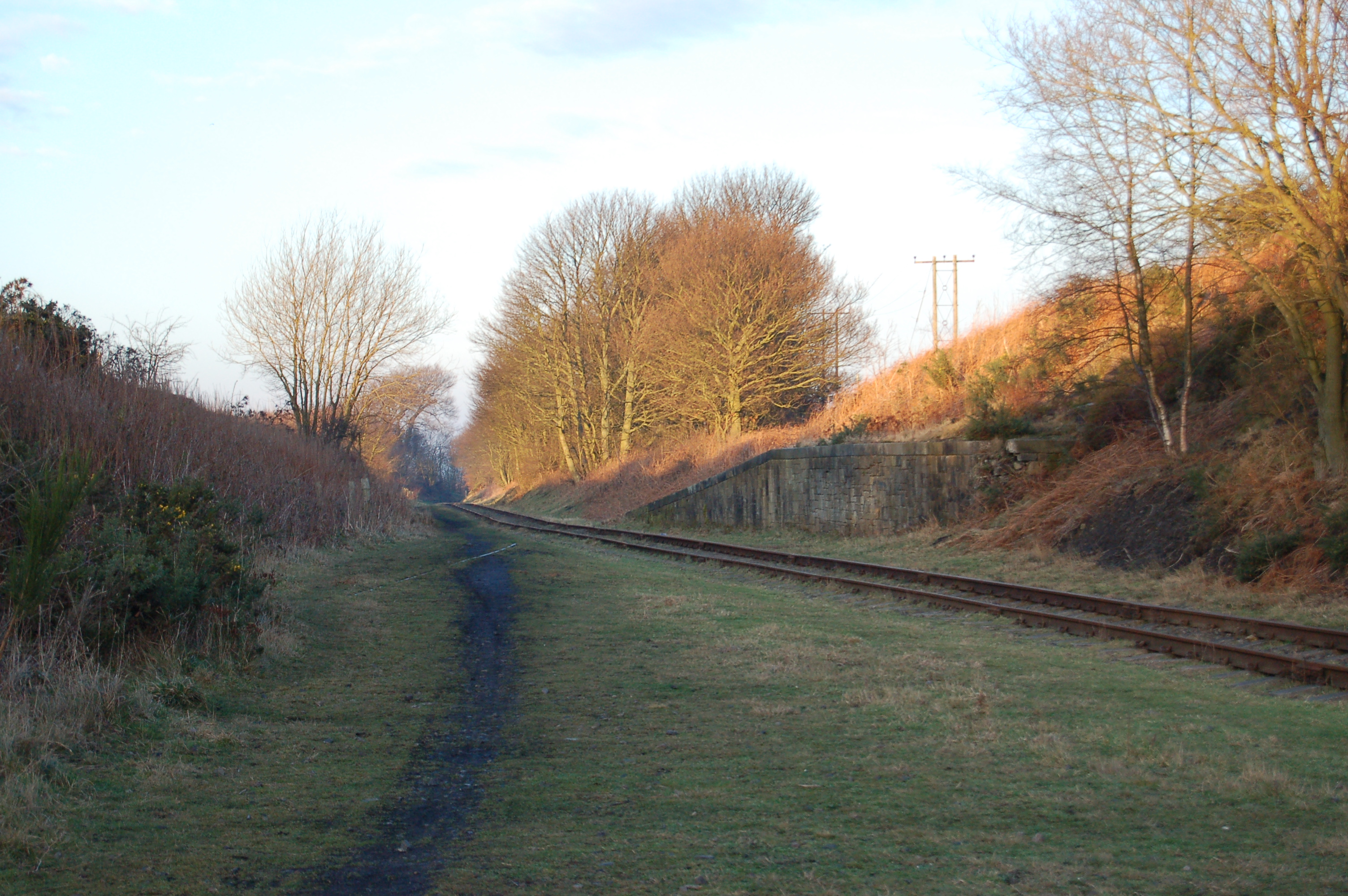
Bowes Bridge Coaling Stage

Bowes Bridge MPD (a sub-shed of Gateshead MPD) on the North Eastern Railway's Tanfield Branch was also in this area, and the disused Turntable pit and coaling stage for the locomotives are still extant alongside the Tanfield Railway, whose car park now occupies the site of Gibraltar Row and Marley Hill Terrace. Bowes Terrace occupied the high ground on the opposite side of the Tanfield Branch, overlooking Marley Hill engine shed, (reputed to be the world's oldest working example) which is still in use by the Tanfield Railway for the storage and maintenance of its locomotives. A number of additional buildings have been constructed around the shed in the years since the site became a heritage railway, including sheds for the storage of out-of use locomotives and rolling stock, a shed for the restored carriages used on the passenger services, as well as a number of workshops. The mine tubs from outside the school were restored in the railway's woodwork shop. Marley Hill shed was actually on the Bowes Railway, which crossed the Tanfield Branch on the level beside the signal box and was owned by the National Coal Board after nationalisation in 1947, whereas the Tanfield branch (by this time part of the London & North Eastern Railway) came under the control of British Railways. There are bus stops either side of the road here, which would have originally been used by the occupants of Andrews Houses. These are now used mainly by visitors to the Tanfield Railway, and are served by Go North East routes X30 and X31 from Stanley, except Sundays, when only X31 operates. Both terminate at Newcastle, but X31 follows the same route previously used by the X30, via Lobley Hill and Gateshead, while the X30 now deviates from this at Sunniside, following a similar route to that of the old 706 via Sunniside Road, Whickham Highway and Dunston Bank.

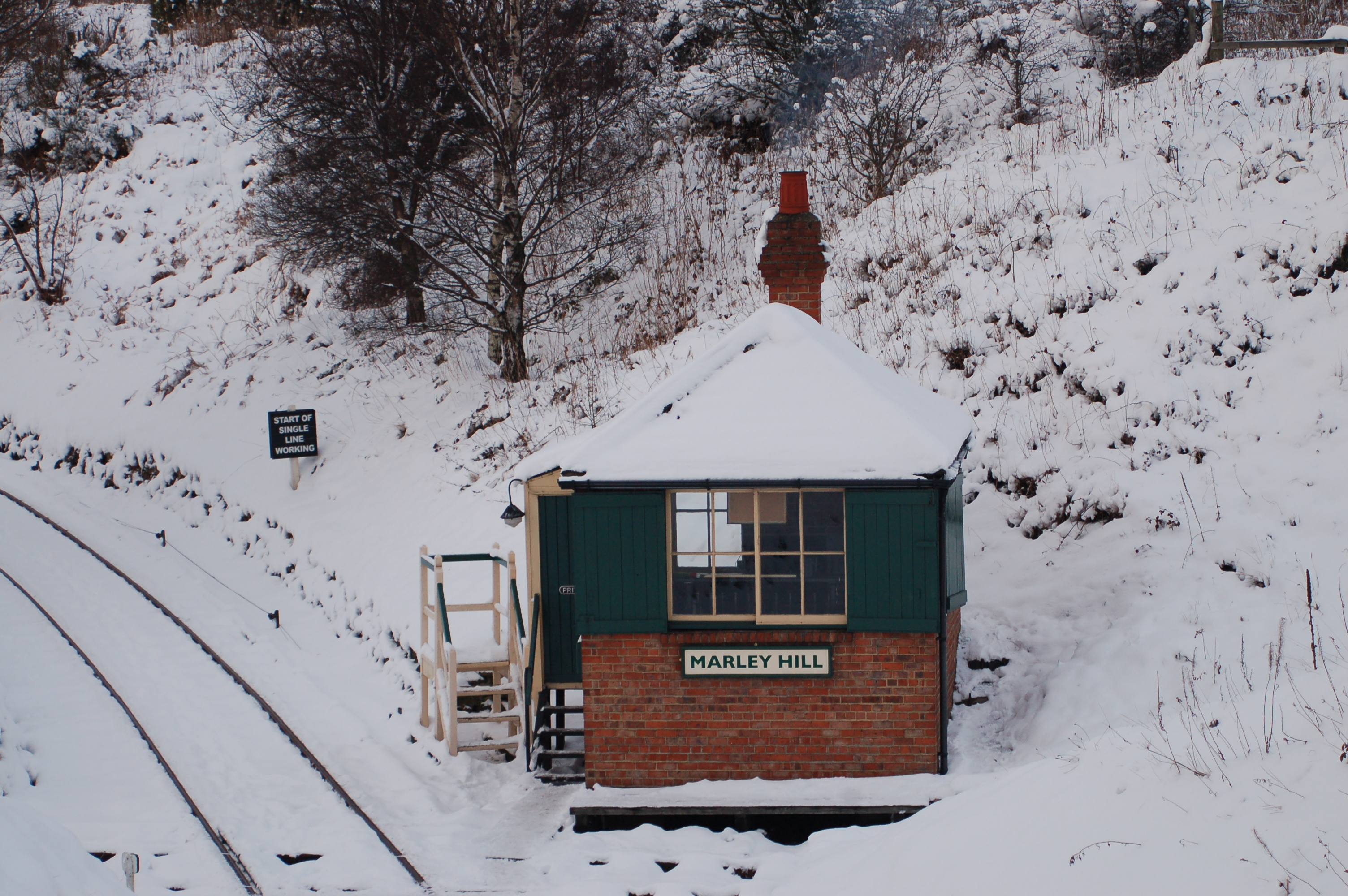
Marley Hill Signal Box

The majority of the houses in this area were very basic, and were in an extremely poor condition by the time they were demolished. Some were of a similar design to the houses in the pit village at the nearby Beamish Museum, and others were built as back-to-backs, a type common in Yorkshire (large numbers remain in Leeds), Lancashire and the Midlands but rarely seen in the north-east. The Bowes Railway ran through a cutting east of the signal box, and the Stanley road crossed it on a bridge. After the closure of the line, this bridge was no longer necessary, and the cutting was backfilled, although the western end of it is still visible adjacent to the box, forming the headshunt of the shed yard. There was also another colliery in this area; [ Andrews House Colliery, which was served by a spur from the Bowes Railway, part of which is still in existence. This is the section of track which crosses the entrance to the shed yard and passes behind the shed, beneath the former coal drops, and continues a short distance to the rear of the site.

Coal was also mined from Blackburn Fell Drift, on the other side of the Stanley road, which was served by the Bowes Railway. It had a relatively short life compared to the deep mine, being driven in 1937 and closing in 1979, with the men transferring to Marley Hill. In contrast to those of its neighbours, the surface buildings of this mine (including stables for the pit ponies) survived in a derelict condition for over twenty years, and the partially blocked entrance to the drift itself, (with tub lines emerging from it) was still visible beneath one of them right up until they were finally removed in the early 21st century. Although the main surface structures are gone, a small hut made from the yellow bricks characteristic of many local colliery buildings stands on the hill overlooking the site of the drift, on the opposite side of Birklands Lane. Its windows and door have been bricked up, and a small chimney-like structure which appears to be some kind of vent projects from the roof at one end. Looking from the point where the drift emerged, (and assuming the drift ran in a relatively straight line) this structure appears to sit directly above the main roadway. It is therefore a possibility that it housed pumps or an emergency access shaft, or both. This structure does not appear on the 1921 OS map, but is visible on the map from 1951 (the area is not covered on the 1938–39 map), so it is probably safe to assume that it is in some way associated with the drift. The trackbed of the Bowes Railway on this side of the Stanley road is now a cycle path, and continues from the site of the drift's screens, past Birkheads Cottages and the adjoining Birkheads Secret Gardens, and on to Kibblesworth, where the next colliery on the line was situated.

Andrews House Colliery closed in 1920. The coke works closed in 1937, with coke production transferred to the newly constructed Monkton Coke Works at the other end of the Bowes Railway near Hebburn, which would eventually become the last operational battery of coke ovens in the area, finally closing in 1991. Many of the men formerly employed at the Marley Hill ovens found work in the newly opened Blackburn Fell Drift. In later years, the coal produced at the colliery was removed in diesel-hauled sets of tubs via the Clockburn Drift, which opened in 1952 and connected underground with the Marley Hill workings. This emerged about two miles from the shafts, on the south bank of the River Derwent. Upon exiting the drift, the tubs of coal immediately crossed the river on a bridge just upstream of the Butterfly Bridge at Winlaton Mill. The coal was then screened and washed, and taken either to Derwenthaugh Staiths at the confluence of the Derwent and the Tyne, or was used at Derwenthaugh Coke Works. The sites of the railway sidings serving the drift, the coke ovens, and the associated coal preparation plant, power station and chemical works have been decontaminated and extensively landscaped, with the only obvious piece of evidence that mining has taken place nearby being the iron-stained water issuing from the ground above the buried drift entrance as a result of the drift acting as a drainage adit for the colliery workings.

At the end of the 1970s there were very few collieries left in the area, and with the closure of Eden Colliery in 1980, Marley Hill, which had for some time been the last colliery in Gateshead, became one of the only three remaining colliers in the west of the coalfield. Although most of the seams were relatively thin, and therefore did not lend themselves easily to mechanisation, the high quality coking coal they yielded had ensured the colliery's longevity. However, a number of factors proved to be the colliery's undoing. The stationary engines which had powered the line shafting in workshops and factories had been ousted by the arrival of smaller and more efficient electric motors, and electric pumps had almost completely replaced large beam engines at water works. (Ironically, the coal mining industry had been one of the earliest to spot the potential advantages of electricity as a source of power- using it for everything from lighting to pumping to powering locomotives, thereby nurturing the technology that would one day play a significant part in its downfall.) British Rail's huge fleet of steam locomotives had gone by the end of the 1960s, and by the late 70s even the NCB's locomotive fleet consisted almost entirely of diesels. The decline of the steel industry greatly reduced the demand for coke and the exploitation of the North Sea oil and gas reserves and the resulting changeover of the domestic gas supply virtually eliminated any demand for coal gas. At around the same time, the gradual transition from coal and coke fires to gas central heating for domestic purposes was well under way, further reducing demand for coal. Although power stations still had an enormous appetite for coal, this could be easily met by the massive undersea mines in the east of the coalfield, as well as the large opencast sites in Northumberland. The writing was on the wall for smaller collieries like Marley Hill.

Closure finally came in 1983, shortly followed by Bearpark in 1984 and Sacriston in 1985. Ten years after the last coals were drawn from Marley Hill, the closure of the coastal collieries (including Wearmouth Colliery) in Sunderland, to which a number of Marley Hill miners had transferred after their own pit closed, saw deep mining in the Durham coalfield finally come to an end, leaving Ellington Colliery in Northumberland as the only north-east pit to survive into the new millennium.

Deep mining was (and still is), a dangerous undertaking, and although it was never the scene of a major disaster like that at the nearby Burns Pit, Marley Hill Colliery was no stranger to the accidents which plagued the industry. In total, around thirty-nine miners lost their lives at the colliery during its one hundred and forty-two years of operation. Some of those killed are buried in St. Cuthbert's churchyard. In addition to the various fatalities which occurred underground, one man was killed when a boiler exploded, and the proximity of the various railway lines and sidings to the houses (with the shunting of wagons taking place day and night) yielded tragic results on at least two occasions: firstly in 1888, when a four-year-old girl called Elizabeth Langdon was knocked down and killed by a locomotive while walking on the branch that served the original beehive coke ovens which gave Coke Row its name, and again fifty-four years later, when a Mr. John Mitchell was struck by a locomotive while walking home from the colliery at the end of a shift. The date of this particular incident (7 Dec 1942) suggests that he may have been walking in the dark under wartime blackout conditions. A possible explanation as to how the collision was not avoided is that Mr. Mitchell and the driver of the locomotive simply did not see each other in the dark. Steam locomotives would have presented a unique threat under such conditions because, unlike diesels, when not working particularly hard they can move remarkably quietly. The noisy environment of a colliery yard, with the constant rattle of unbraked wagons being shunted could no doubt quite easily mask the sound of a locomotive approaching in the dark. Even if Mr. Mitchell had heard the locomotive, (and assuming it was in fact dark at the time) it is quite possible that it would have been difficult to pinpoint its exact location on the maze of points and sidings by sound alone.

Although a return to traditional deep mining methods in Marley Hill and the surrounding area is extremely unlikely, substantial reserves of coal remain. However, these reserves remain largely untapped as they would need to be obtained by opencast mining. This has already proven to be controversial, with a planning application to extract 480,000 tonnes of coal and 100,000 tonnes of fireclay on an area of farmland at Skon's Park, just north of Burnopfield coming up against strong local objection, particularly from Derwent Residents Against Mining Application (DRAMA), led by Burnopfield resident Eddie Stringer, who were supported by former miner and Labour MP Dave Anderson, several Liberal Democrat councillors and the National Trust. These objections centred primarily on the potential issues of noise and dust, large numbers of heavy goods vehicles travelling through Marley Hill, Byermoor and Sunniside, as well as the proposed mine's close proximity to the Gibside Estate. The National Trust eventually bought the 150 acres of land in question for £500,000 to prevent further mining applications. As of July 2011, another application, to mine coal in an area adjacent to Birkland Lane near Hedley Hall Farm (to the south-east of the site of Blackburn Fell Drift) has been submitted to Gateshead Council's planning department. Although Liberal Democrat councillor Jonathan Wallace immediately voiced concerns, this application has a greater likelihood of being approved than the proposed Skon's Park site, as this area has a much smaller population, does not lie near the Gibside Estate and an opencast mine was operating nearby relatively recently.

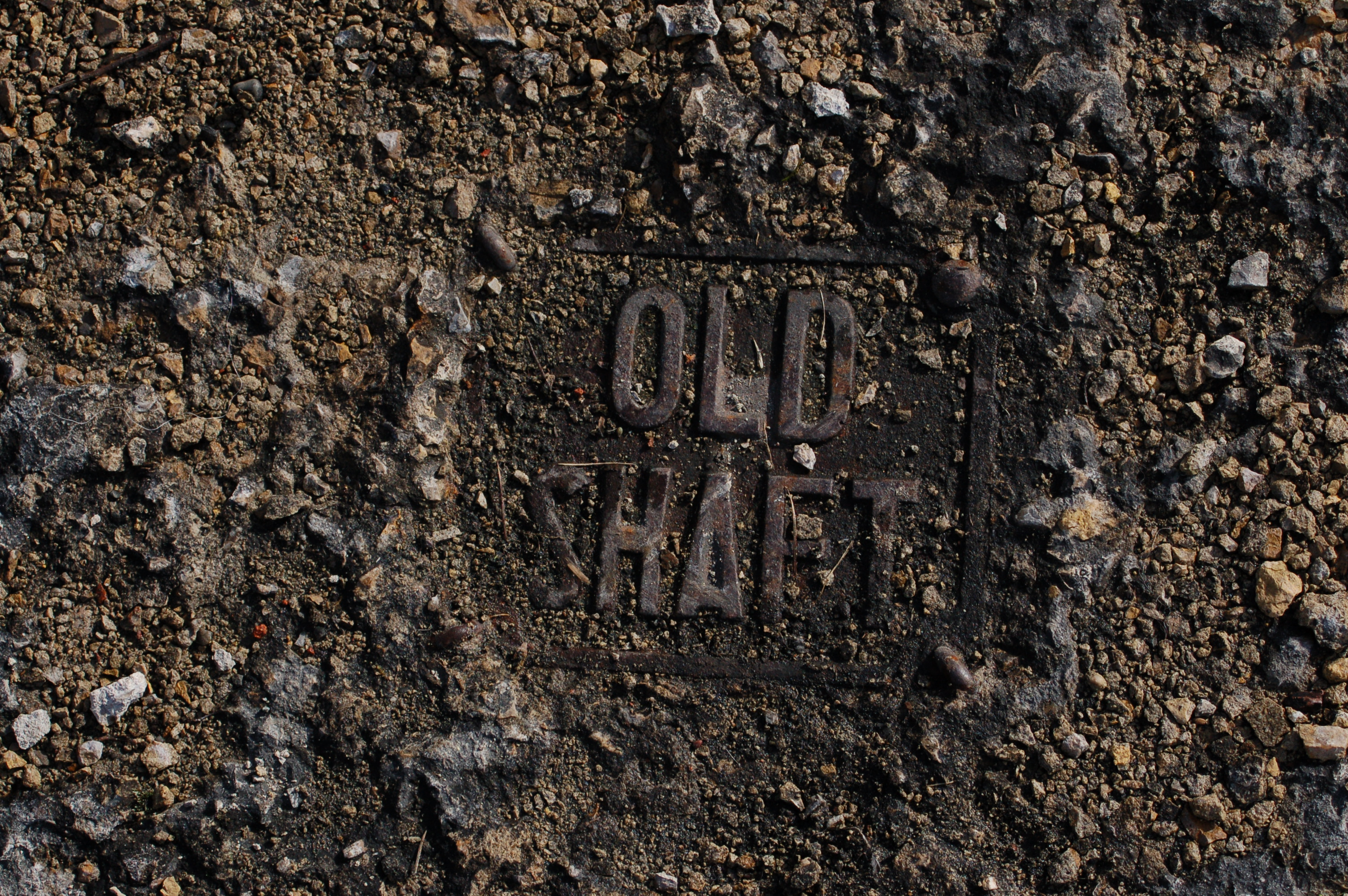
Concrete cap on Lodge Shaft

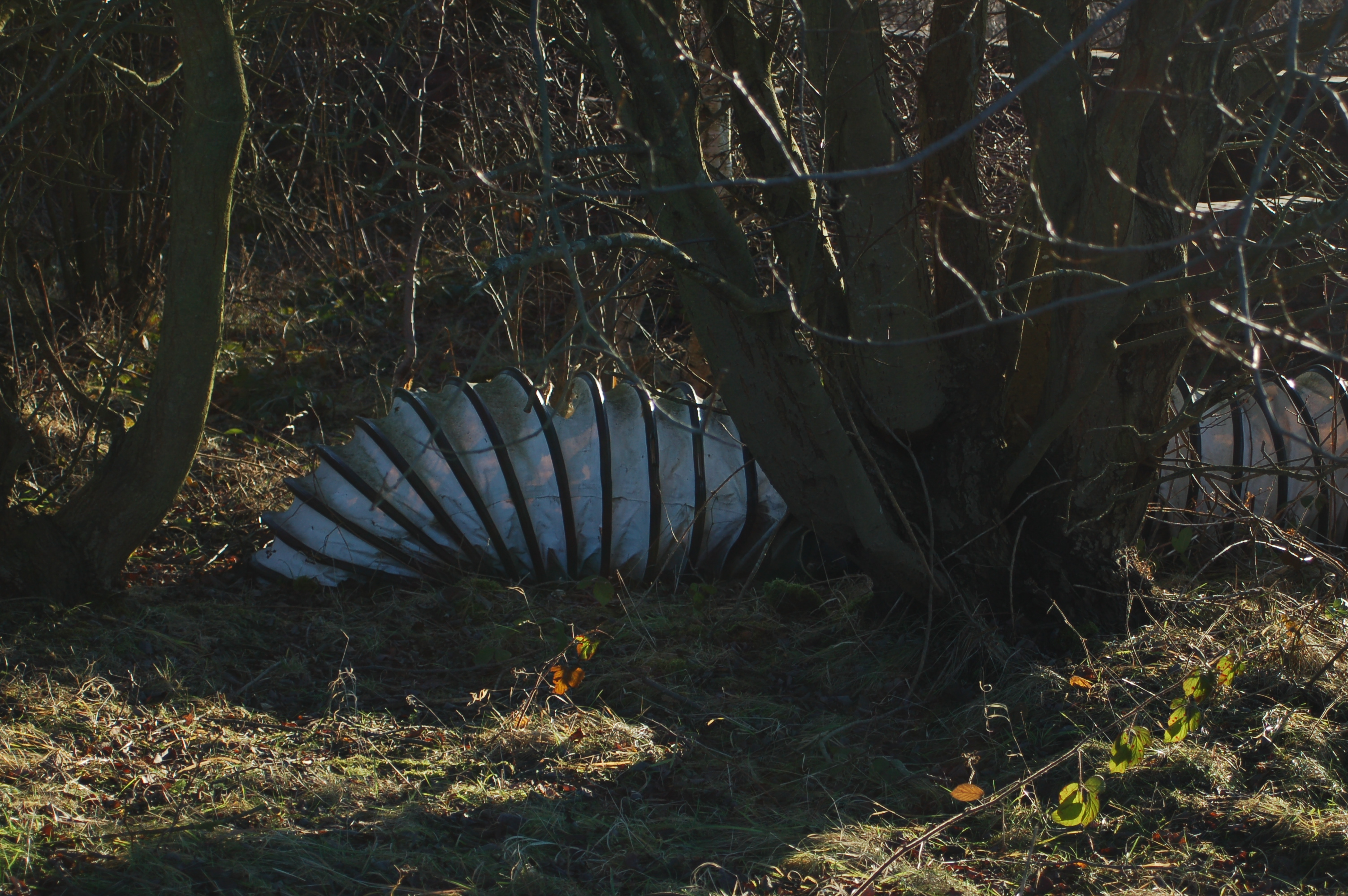
Discarded ventilation ducting

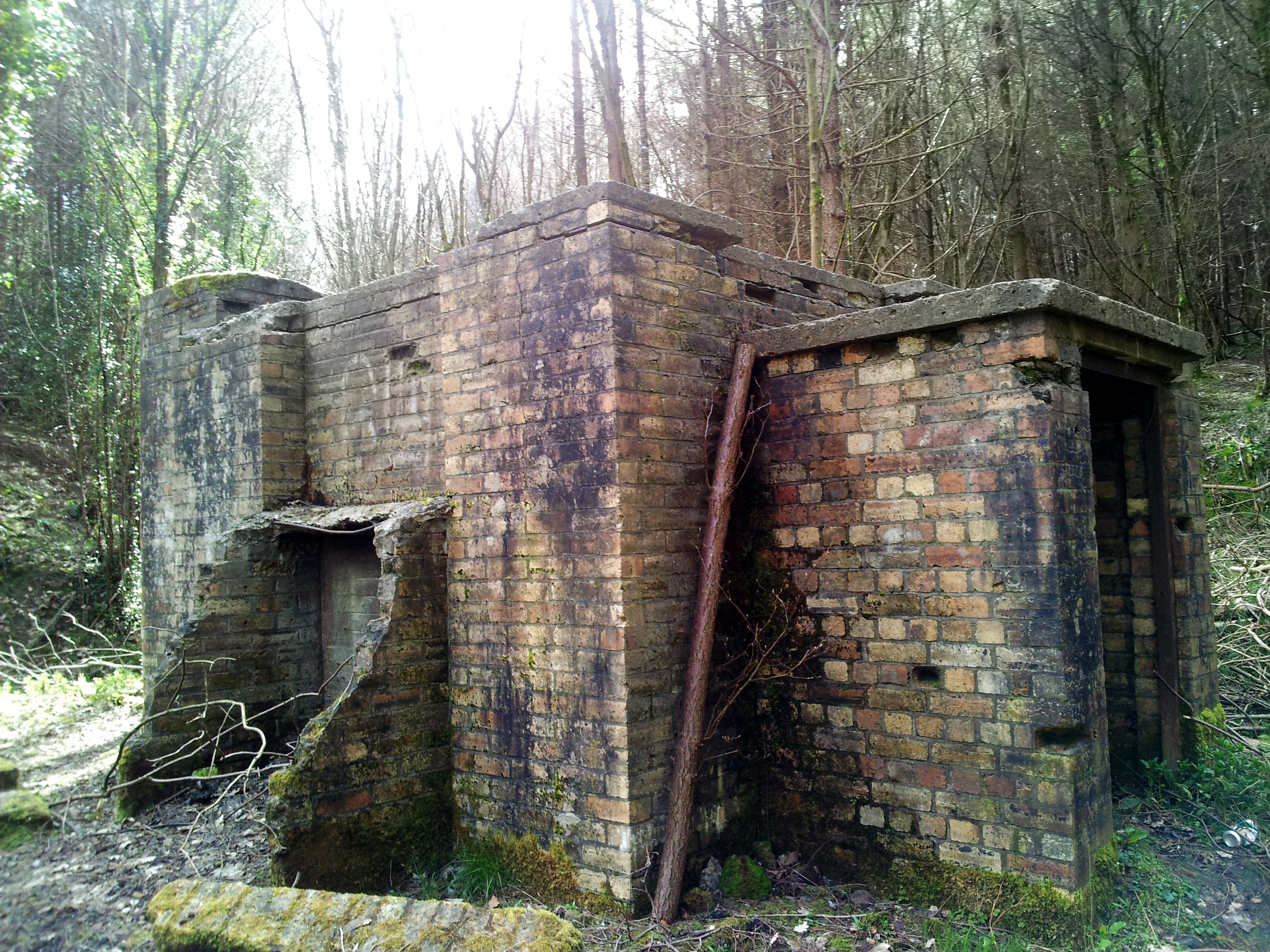
Hollinside Shaft in 2014

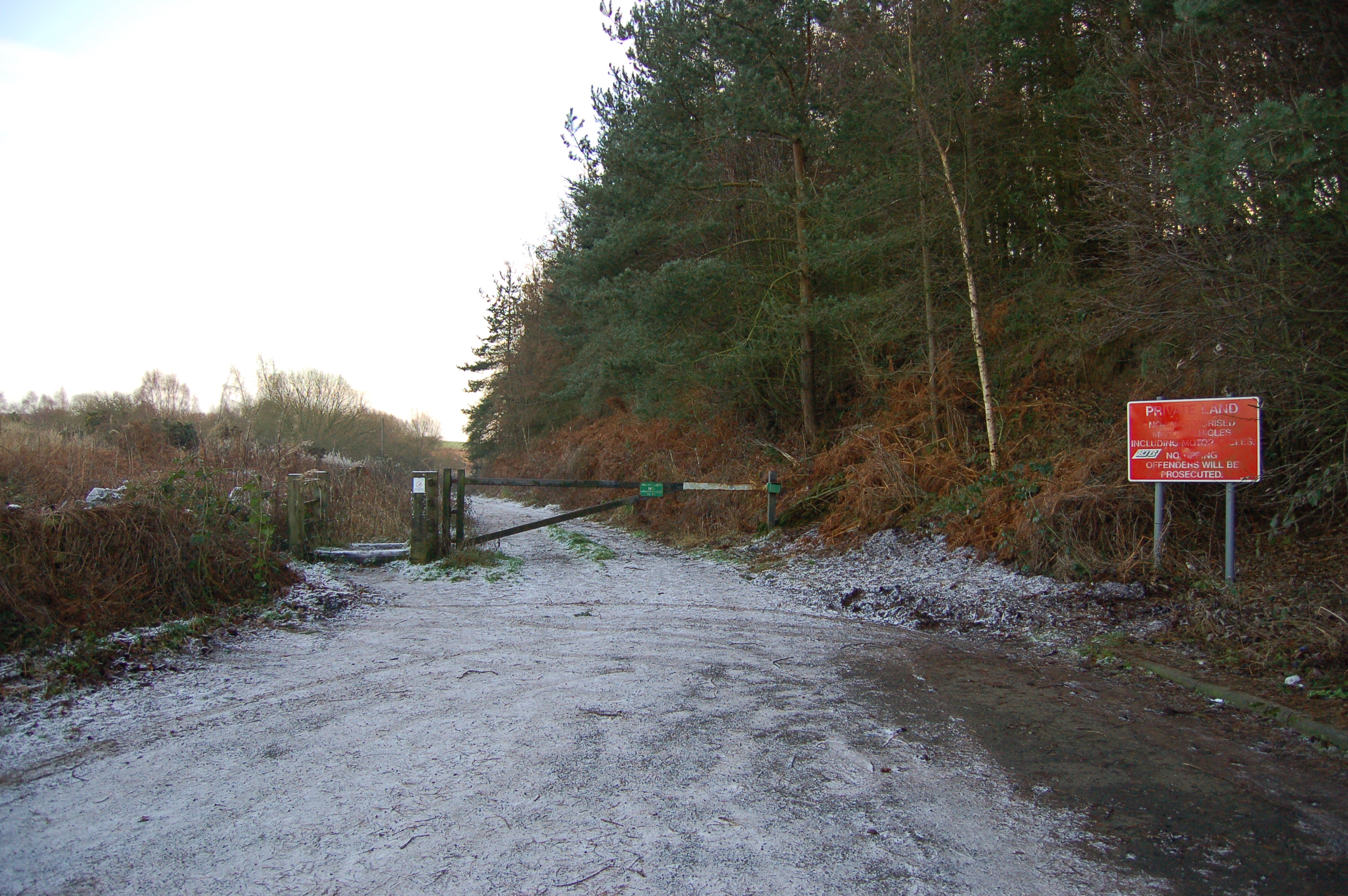
RJB Mining sign warning against unauthorised vehicles and fly-tipping at the entrance to the former colliery site.

After closure, the headgears and other machinery at Marley Hill Colliery were scrapped and the buildings levelled. A hole was knocked into the wall of the square building which enclosed the top of the upcast shaft, and the rubble from the rest of the buildings tipped in to backfill it. This process having been completed, the building was demolished and a large concrete cap placed over the mouth of each shaft. There appear to be only two remaining buildings directly associated with the colliery. One of these is an airlock above a backfilled ventilation shaft from the Clockburn Drift, hidden away in Clockburn Wood near Whickham. The shaft was known as the Hollinside Shaft and actually pre-dates the drift as it was originally part of Axwell Park Colliery, which was situated roughly a mile to the north-east. This colliery closed in 1954 after men from Marley Hill began working its remaining reserves beneath Hollinside and Gibside via the drift, at which point the NCB installed a fan to aid ventilation, these workings being some distance from the Shafts at Marley Hill Colliery itself. The other remaining structure is a curious rendered brick hut with double-walled construction and heavy steel doors, which stands in the middle of a field to the south of St. Cuthbert's Park. It is best to consult Google Earth to pinpoint the location. This is the colliery's former powder magazine, where explosives for use underground were stored. It was presumably constructed sometime in the first couple of years of the 20th century, as the bricks used, which bear the name "Blythe & Sons, Birtley Station" along with the letters ER (Edward VII) and the date 1901, are of the same type (stamped 1903 and 1904) used to construct Church Street, Cuthbert Street and Glamis Terrace. It has evidently been designed to direct the force of any explosion upwards, with its isolated location meaning that the resulting debris would not land on the surrounding houses or colliery buildings. It is (for unknown reasons) sometimes referred to locally as "the butterfly chambers" and fell out of use some time before the colliery closed, with one former Marley Hill miner recalling playing in it as a child. A new explosives store was built to replace it, this building being situated near the pit head baths.

The land on which the original village and the pit itself stood (along with the site of the cokeworks, Andrews House Colliery and Bowes Bridge MPD) has lain empty since the colliery was demolished, although the foundations of a number of buildings, a few old concrete lamp-posts, some of the tub lines, and the concrete caps covering the backfilled shafts are still clearly visible. The upcast shaft is on top of the hill overlooking the yard of the Tanfield Railway, and the two caps covering the coal-drawing shafts can be found in a gully just to the north of it, hidden among the trees. Until around 2010, the metal floor tiles of the pit head baths were still in situ, but have since been removed by scrap thieves. The stables are easily identifiable, with drainage channels running down the centre, and post-holes where the stalls would have been. The steps leading up to the door of the colliery's office block are still in situ, and Peruvian Lilies can still be found where the flower beds at the front of the building were. Considerable numbers of Crocosmia and Lupins can also be found growing in the area where the screens and headgear of the coal-drawing shafts once stood, most likely as a result of somebody tipping garden waste. The NCB sign which stood at the entrance to the colliery yard is now on display in the Tanfield Railway's carriage shed. Almost thirty years after closure, nature has largely reclaimed the site, with an abundance of wildlife having taken up residence, and the area is well known locally for the rich pickings to be had when blackberries are in season. However, the entire area remains covered in spoil from the two collieries (as does the site of Byermoor Colliery) and there is still a considerable amount of junk, such as steel toe-capped wellingtons, compressed air hoses and ventilation ducting lying around in the undergrowth. Fly tipping has also been a problem, with a notable incident occurring on the Tanfield Railway's coal train day in October 1998, when a vast heap of tyres which had been dumped in the gill adjacent to the site of the cokeworks was set alight. The fire destroyed a number of trees, and was visible from trains on the incline between Bobgins Crossing and Andrews House Station. The land is now owned by UK Coal, and a sign by the gate on St. Cuthbert's Road bearing the company's former name (RJB Mining) warns against fly-tipping.

Despite most of the area now being covered in trees and shrubs, very little vegetation other than patchy grass and a few scrubby trees grows on the site of the cokeworks and associated chemical works, indicating the presence of the very high levels of ground contamination associated with such industries (some of the miners recall working in an area directly beneath the works' former tar beds and being able to smell tar which had seeped down into the coal seams, while contaminants such as a cyanide containing compound known as "blue billy" have also been detected in the soil). On 29 May 2012, a public consultation was held at the community centre to discuss proposals by UK Coal to remove 900,000 tonnes of high quality coal (described as being "like rocket fuel" compared to the "rough coal" being mined at the Potland Burn and Butterwell sites in Northumberland) from beneath the area by opencast mining, as part of a four-year scheme to reclaim the heavily contaminated site. Part of the proposals, should planning permission be granted are to extend the Tanfield Railway along the former route of the Bowes Railway to Byermoor. Presumably any services to Byermoor would either run from Andrews House, or bring the disused Marley Hill Station just to the north of the shed back into use.

== High Marley Hill ==
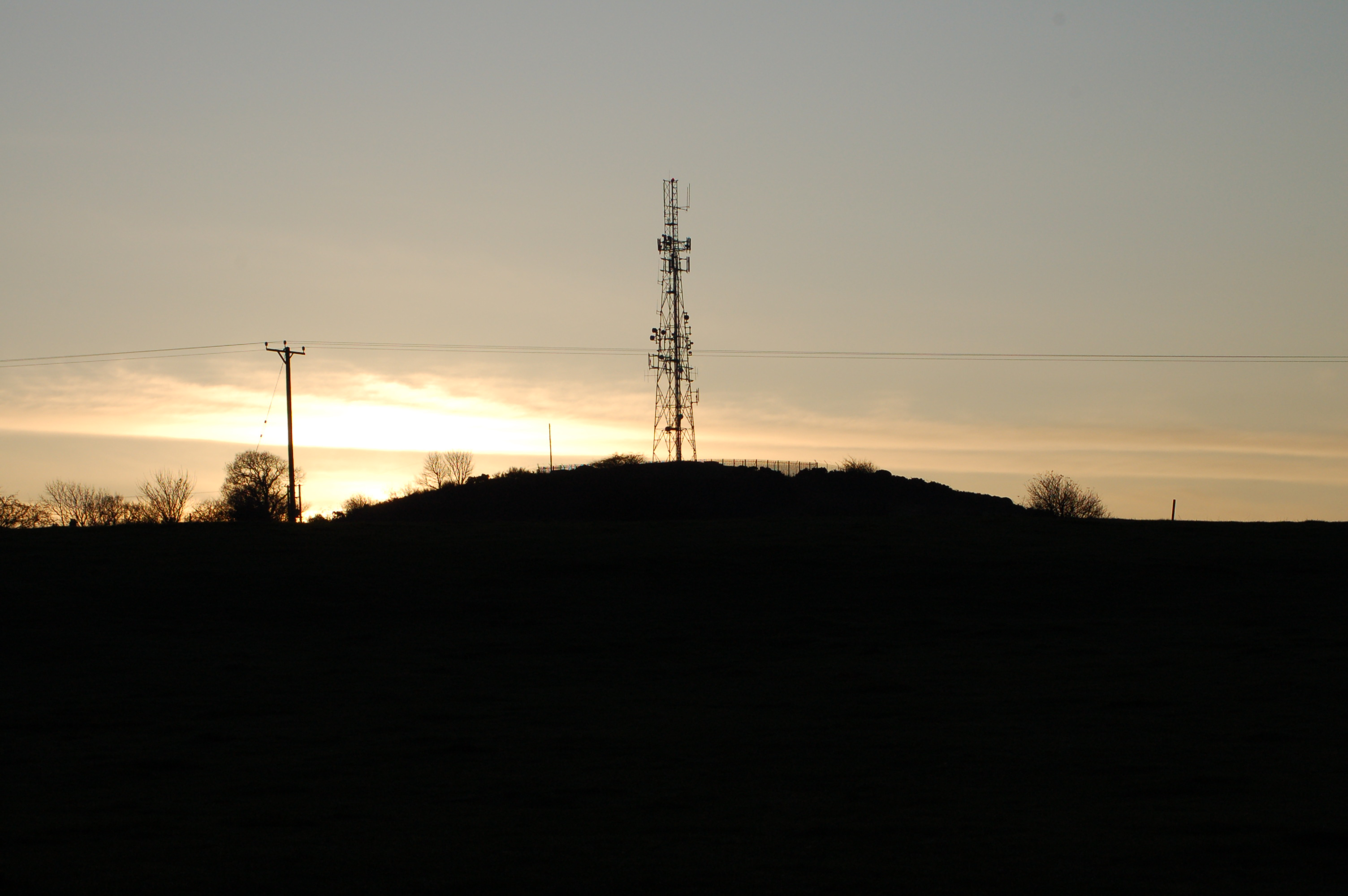
Blackamoor Hill

The summit of the high ground between the Tyne, Derwent and Team valleys is to the West of the village, about halfway between Byermoor and Marley Hill itself and is surmounted by an outcrop known as Blackamoor Hill. This area is known as High Marley Hill. It consists of three cottages beside the road, a large house which is accessed via School House Lane, Longfield Farm, a pallet works which occupies the former High Marley Hill School buildings, and several buildings surrounding a large radio antenna currently operated by Arquiva. This sits on top of Blackamoor Hill, from where it is able to broadcast signals across a considerable area (from the rear of Cuthbert Street on a clear day it is possible to see as far as the mouth of the Tyne, and as far North as the RAF's radar station at Brizlee Wood near Alnwick, and from ground level at High Marley Hill the visible area stretches into the North Pennines and East as far as Penshaw Hill near Sunderland). The existing mast replaced an earlier 140 foot mast that was part of the network known as the Medium Frequency Regional Scheme that provided police radio broadcasts between the early 1940s and '50s and covered the area between North Yorkshire and the Scottish border. This was decommissioned when the more modern system using two-way radios was introduced. In early 1942 a Hawker Hurricane crashed in poor weather into an orchard across the road from mast, killing its Royal Canadian Air Force pilot, 24 year old Sergeant James D'Arcy Lees Graham. There is a plaque commemorating the incident in the community centre.

There was an anti-aircraft battery near High Marley Hill during World War II, and a drift mine which closed in the 1960s, as did the nearby Byermoor Colliery. The 1951 OS map shows an opencast mine in the field beside the road, near the farm (marked on the map as Longfield House) and there is an embankment which runs parallel to School House Lane, from the site of the drift to the remains of a large retaining wall. This was presumably a loading point on the Bowes Railway, the trackbed of which is still visible, running alongside St. Cuthbert's Road. The presence of a large flat area of waste ground on the opposite side of the road to the wall is a possible indication there were railway sidings here. It is not known whether this loading point also handled the output of the opencast. The 1951 map also shows a terrace called Waggonway Row just beside the retaining wall. The outline of these houses can be seen from the air and is visible on Google Maps. The large house on School House Lane has several outbuildings which appear to have been associated with the drift. This would explain the presence of a sign on the wall of the building nearest the road which reads "UK Coal Monitoring Station." Exactly what this is monitoring is unclear, although it is likely to be mine water or gas. School House Lane forms the southern end of St. Cuthbert's Road, and vehicular access beyond the large house is prevented by a large concrete block which has been placed in the centre of the lane.
