= Washing Wells Roman Fort =

- Location within Tyne and Wear
- 54.9362°N 1.65842°W
- Location: Gateshead, Tyne and Wear, England

Washing Wells Roman Fort, was a fort in the Roman province of Britannia. Its ruins are located at (grid reference NZ219602) southeast of Whickham in Gateshead, Tyne and Wear.

== History ==
The fort was discovered from the air in 1970 and is trapezoid measuring about 490 by 410 feet and covering an area of about 4.5 acres (1.8 ha). The fort has not been excavated.
