= Tanfield Railway =

Preserved railway in County Durham, England

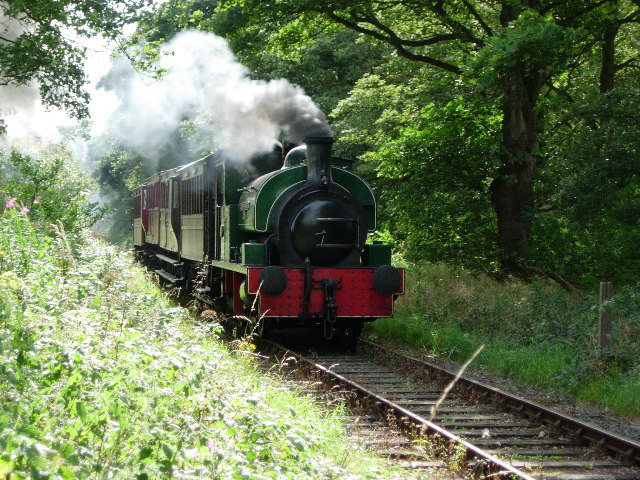
- Locale: North East England
- Coordinates: 54.908°N 1.675°W

Commercial operations
- Name: Tanfield Railway
- Original gauge: Wooden Waggonway / Iron 4 ft 8 1/2 in (1,435 mm) standard gauge

Preserved operations
- Stations: 4
- Length: 3 miles (4.8 km)
- Preserved gauge: 4 ft 8 1/2 in (1,435 mm) standard gauge

The Tanfield Railway is a 4 ft 8 1/2 in (1,435 mm) standard gauge heritage railway in Gateshead and County Durham, England. It runs on part of a former horse-drawn colliery wooden waggonway, later rope and horse and lastly rope and locomotive railway. It operates preserved industrial steam locomotives. The railway operates a passenger service every Sunday, plus other days, as well as occasional demonstration coal, goods and mixed trains.

The line runs 3 miles (4.8 km) between a southern terminus at East Tanfield, Durham, to a northern terminus at Sunniside, Gateshead. Another station, Andrews House, is situated near the Marley Hill engine shed. A halt also serves the historic site of the Causey Arch. The railway claims it is "the world's oldest railway" because it runs on a section dating from 1725, other parts being in use since 1647.

The volunteer-staffed railway is run by three bodies: Friends of Tanfield Railway, Tanfield Railway Trust which owns the railway, the locomotives and rolling stock, and The Tanfield Railway Company which operates the railway.

The Tanfield Railway Company is split into four departments, each having a manager and director: Engineering who maintain locomotives, Operations including drivers and guards, Carriage & Waggon who look after rolling stock, and Commercial which operates shops, events and the passenger side of operations.

== Colliery railway ==
The Tanfield Waggonway was built by the Grand Allies, an association of coal-owning families, including the Bowes, Liddells, Ords and Montagues, who joined to overcome wayleave difficulties from about 1720. Its purpose was to transport coal more reliably and cheaply from the inland collieries of County Durham to the staiths on the River Tyne at Redheugh. From there the coal was transported in keels downriver to Shields, then transferred to colliers (bulk coal carrying ships) for the voyage down the North Sea coast to southeast England.

Many older shorter coal waggonways existed to the north of the present heritage line, in the Whickham and Lobley Hill areas, but the Tanfield Waggonway was a much longer and heavily engineered route which gave the Grand Allies market dominance all year round (although supply to SE England was still subject to North Sea winters). The Tanfield route was in continuous use from 1725 until final closure in 1964.

The route and structures of the oldest section of the now preserved part of the line, between Sunniside and Causey, dates from 1725, and is thus the world's oldest railway still in operation. (The Middleton Railway makes an alternative claim to be the oldest railway, as the first railway granted powers under the first railway act of parliament in 1758.) The Causey to East Tanfield section was built in 1839.

The Marley Hill engine shed was built by 1854, and was in industrial use until 1970. The shed is on the Bowes Railway, whereas locos used on the Tanfield branch were stabled at the nearby Bowes Bridge MPD (a sub-shed of Gateshead), the coaling ramp and turntable pit of which are still visible adjacent to the track between Andrews House and Sunniside. A winding engine occupied the Bowes Bridge site from 1840 to 1881, a locomotive shed from 1881 to 1962. The headshunt by Marley Hill signal box is the point where the west-east Bowes Railway crossed the south-north Tanfield branch.

When the Tanfield Railway began running trains in 1977 a curve was installed to allow Marley Hill locos and trains onto the Tanfield Branch. Marley Hill engine shed is the oldest in the world still used for its original function. As collieries on the NCB line closed in the 1960s, coal was brought by road to adjacent drops for onward rail transport, and the shed saw further use servicing other local colliery locomotives.

Originally a wooden railed horse drawn waggonway, conversion to a steel railed railway began in 1837, and by 1840 was complete as far as Tanfield Moor Colliery, using stationary steam engines, gravity inclines and horses. In 1881, while operated by the North Eastern Railway, steam locomotives replaced the stationary steam engines and horses. Although primarily a coal railway, it did carry some passengers. The railway closed when the last colliery on the line at East Tanfield ceased production in 1964.

== Preservation ==
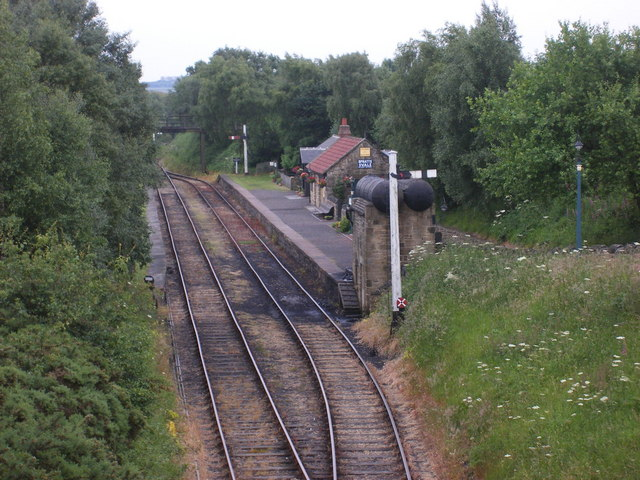
Andrews House Station

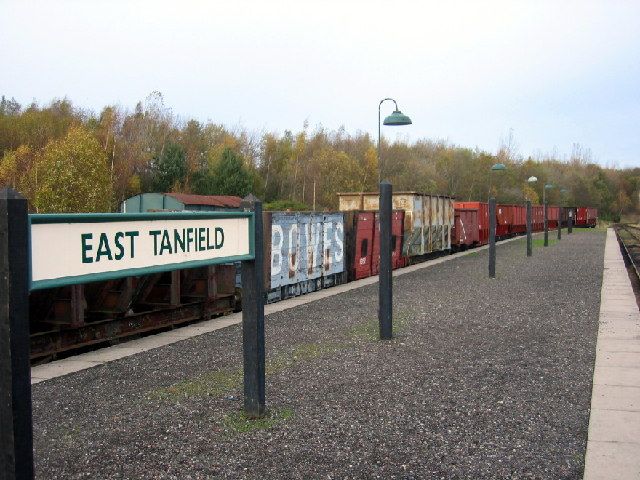
Freight train at East Tanfield

The early years of the railway as a preservation project concentrated on Marley Hill, preparing locos for steaming, working on the shed structure and acquiring basic needs such as water and electricity. Locomotives No.21 (Robert Stephenson and Hawthorns engine of 1954 0-4-0st) and No.5 (Malleable) were steamed in public in 1973. The first passenger train ran for a week August 1975, using locomotives No.21, No.32 and Sir Cecil A Cochrane, and a small carriage acquired from the British Steel Corporation site at Teesside.

The preserved line was first built from Marley Hill to the current northern terminus, Sunniside Station, with passenger trains beginning on 2 July 1981, and an official opening ceremony on 14 July 1982. Andrews House station just south of Marley Hill sheds was completed between 1987 and 1989 and was equipped with platforms, a water tower, a station building and a footbridge. The first train south to Causey was on 27 July 1991, with the official opening ceremony being held on 15 August 1991. The first train further south to the current end of the line at East Tanfield occurred on 18 October 1992. East Tanfield Station itself was opened in 1997. The Causey to Tanfield section is through a wood lined gorge.

Part of the reason the line was preserved was the fact Marley Hill shed remained open until 1970. The vintage machinery in the workshop is still capable of full locomotive overhauls. The oldest locomotive on the railway was built in Gateshead in 1873, and all of the railway's carriage stock dates from the 19th Century.

== Causey Arch ==
The current preserved line passes near to Causey Arch, the oldest surviving railway bridge in the world. It was built to carry a new branch from the route of the now preserved line to a site known as Dawson's Drift. Built between 1725 and 1727, at 150 ft (46 m) long and 80 ft (24 m) high}, it was the largest single-span bridge in Britain, and remained so for 30 years.

== Locations ==
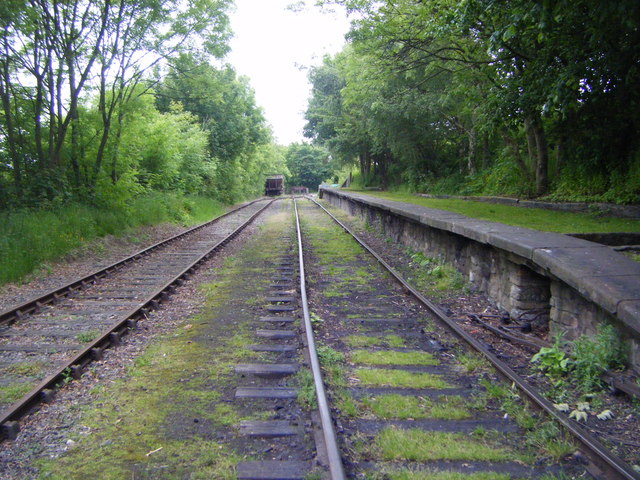
Sunniside station before track remodelling and refurbishment.

Point	Coordinates (Links to map resources)	OS Grid Ref	Notes
Sunniside	54.9206°N 1.6750°W	NZ20925848	
Marley Hill signal box	54.90995°N 1.67580°W	NZ20885729	
Marley Hill engine sheds	54.9097°N 1.6786°W	NZ20705726	
Andrews House	54.9089°N 1.6758°W	NZ20885717	
Causey Arch	54.8972°N 1.6869°W	NZ20175587	
East Tanfield	54.8885°N 1.6997°W	NZ19365490	

== Steam locomotives ==
As of 2023, the railway has become the home to a large collection of industrial steam engines, with 28 in all and four operational.

=== Operational locomotives ===
Number and name	Description	Status	Livery	Owner(s)	Date	Photograph
Hawthorn Leslie and Company 0-4-0ST, No.2.	Built by Hawthorn Leslie and Company in 1911. Re-entered service after an overhaul in 2013. Withdrawn for overhaul December 2021. Passed boiler test February 2023 and back in service.	Operational	A few different shades of green with lining	Tanfield Railway Trust	1911	
0-4-0ST Sir Cecil A Cochrane	Sir Cecil A Cochrane was built by Robert Stephenson and Hawthorns in 1948 and worked a few miles from its current home. It is currently in regular use on passenger services and may occasionally be seen hauling a shortened coal train. It has recently undergone a 10-year overhaul.	Operational.	RSH works livery (lined green)	Private	1948	
Andrew Barclay 0-6-0ST No. 1015 "Horden"	This engine was built by Andrew Barclay. The locomotive has been under restoration since August 2012 and entered revenue-earning service in June 2021. The boiler returned from an external contractor in mid-May 2019.	Operational.	N/A	Private	1904	
Andrew Barclay No. 32 Stanley 0-4-0ST	Returned to service in June 2023 following a long-term overhaul.	Operational	Green	Private	1920	
Robert Stephenson and Hawthorns 0-6-0ST NCB No. 49	Built by RSH in 1943. Passed its steam test on 27 March 2018 thus giving it a new 10 year boiler ticket which expires on 27 March 2028. The locomotive returned to service hauling passenger trains in July.	Operational	Green with white and black lining	Private	1943	
0-6-0T Twizell	Returned to service in January 2025 following an overhaul.	Operational	Black, Lined in Red	Tanfield Railway	1891	

=== Locomotives under overhaul/restoration ===
Number and name	Description	Status	Livery	Owner(s)	Date	Photograph
Hudswell Clarke 0-6-0T No. 38	Built by Hudswell Clarke in 1949. Undergoing restoration in Marley Hill yard.	Undergoing Restoration	N/A	Rising Sun locomotive Trust	1949	

=== Stored locomotives ===
Number and name	Description	Status	Livery	Owner(s)	Date	Photograph
Robert Stephenson and Hawthorns No.38 0-6-0ST	38 was built by Robert Stephenson and Hawthorns in 1954. It is currently stored in a partially dismantled state, and is in line to receive a cosmetic overhaul. It was one of a number of identical locomotives which went to collieries in Northumberland, and its generator and electric lights are a legacy of its duties on the Ashington system, where they were necessary for night-time shunting in the yards at Ellington and Lynemouth.	Stored	Black, lined in red	Private	1954	
Hawthorn Leslie 0-6-0ST Stagshaw	Stagshaw was built by Hawthorn Leslie as an example of a Cristiani compressed steam system locomotive, however when this was unsuccessful, Stagshaw was converted to a conventional steam locomotive in 1927 and is currently stored at the Tanfield Railway.	Stored	Black	Private	1923	
Black, Hawthorn & Co 0-4-0ST, Wellington	The oldest locomotive on the railway. Moved to a contractor in Leeming Bar in September 2019 for overhaul to working order. This overhaul stopped in February 2020 and never restarted. It was moved back to Marley Hill in May 2021 and is expected to be overhauled on site instead.	Stored awaiting overhaul	Green with Lining	Private	1873	
Hawthorn Leslie "Cyclops" 0-4-0ST	This engine is now stored at the Marley Hill Site	Stored			1907	
Hudswell Clarke 0-4-0ST, Irwell	This engine is stored in large pieces around the Marley Hill site and is a possible candidate for overhaul	Stored	Green with Lining	Private	1937	
Robert Stephenson and Hawthorns 0-4-0ST, No.21	This engine is stored undercover and a possible candidate for overhaul. Formerly owned by the CEGB for shunting coal at the Stella power stations	Stored	Green with red and black lining	Private	1954	
Sentinel 0-4-0T No.4	This engine is stored outside on the Marley Hill site and is a possible candidate for overhaul. It is a sentinel shunter and therefore resembles a diesel shunter, yet is a steam engine.	Stored	Red	Private	1953	
W.G. Bagnall 0-6-0ST, Gamma	This engine is stored undercover in Marley Hill Engine Shed and can be seen whenever the site is open.	Stored	Originally War Department Black, later NCB Blue with Wasp Striped buffer beams.	Private	1945	
Robert Stephenson and Hawthorns Hendon 0-4-0TC	One of the four surviving crane tanks from Doxford's Shipyard in Sunderland. This engine is currently stored	Stored	Dark Blue		1940	
Hawthorn Leslie No.13 0-4-0ST	CEGB loco from Dunston Power Station. This engine is currently off site	Stored			1928	
Andrew Barclay No.6 0-4-2ST	This engine is currently stored	Stored			1910	
Robert Stephenson and Hawthorns No.44 0-6-0ST	A former stable-mate of No. 49 at Backworth Colliery. This Engine was built to a similar design as Nos. 16 and 38, but slightly smaller. It is currently stored in Marley Hill yard minus its saddletank and the top half of its cab	Stored	Blue		1953	
Robert Stephenson and Hawthorns No.47 0-6-0ST	This engine is currently stored	Stored			1954	
Robert Stephenson and Hawthorns No.16 0-6-0ST	Another loco from the Backworth Colliery system. Built to the same design as No. 38, although minus the generator and electric lights. This engine is currently stored	Stored	Dark Blue		1957	
Hawthorn Leslie No.3 0-6-0ST	This engine is currently stored	Stored				
Hawthorn Leslie Huncoat No.3 0-6-0F	This fireless locomotive is currently stored	Stored				
R and W Hawthorn "Enterprise" 0-4-0ST						

== Diesel and electric locomotives ==
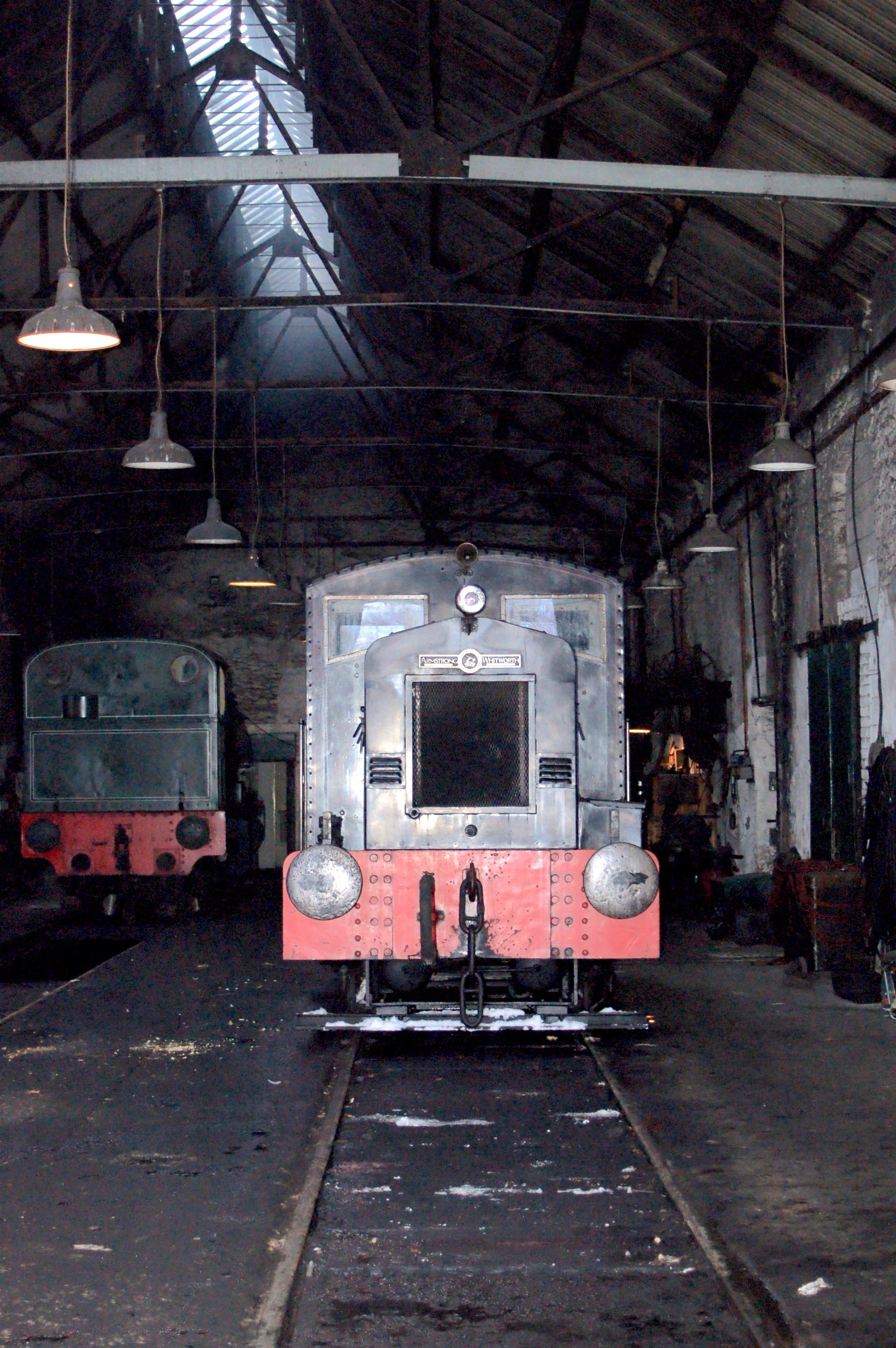
Armstrong Whitworth 0-4-0DE No.2 (D22/1933), regular pilot locomotive at Marley Hill.

- AEG Bo-Bo WE no. 1565 / NCB No.9, built in 1913 for the Harton Coal Company. Withdrawn in 1988. On display in Marley Hill Yard. Awaiting cosmetic restoration in the future.
- Andrew Barclay Sons & Co. 0-6-0DH no. 615, built in 1977. Operational, on hire to the Aln Valley Railway.
- Armstrong Whitworth 0-4-0DE no. D22, built in 1933. Operational.
- English Electric and Baguley 2-2wDHR no. 3565, built in 1962. On display.
- F.C. Hibberd & Co Ltd Planet 4wDM no. 3716, built in 1955. Operational.
- Fowler 0-6-0DH no. 4240010 No. 6, built in 1960. Operational.
- Hawthorn Leslie 4w-4wBE no. 3872 Derek Shepherd, built in 1936. On display.
- Hunslet Engine Company 0-6-0DH no. 6612 No. 501, built in 1965. Stored awaiting restoration.
- Robert Stephenson and Hawthorns 0-4-0DM no. 6980 Camel, built in 1940. On display.
- Robert Stephenson and Hawthorns 0-6-0DM no. 7697 Beryl, built in 1953. On display.
- Robert Stephenson and Hawthorns 0-6-0DM no. 7746 Bromborough No. 2, built in 1954. On display.
- Robert Stephenson and Hawthorns 0-4-0DM no. 7901 Husky, built in 1958. Operational.
- Robert Stephenson and Hawthorns Bo-BoWE no. 7078 Kearsley No. 3, built in 1944. On display.
- Ruston and Hornsby 0-4-0DE no. 418600 T.I.C No. 35, built in 1958. Operational.
- Siemens 4wWE no. 862 / NCB No.10, built in 1913. Sister locomotive to NCB No.9 (see above). On display, cosmetically restored.

Key

- BE = battery-electric
- DE = diesel-electric
- DH = diesel-hydraulic
- DM = diesel-mechanical
- WE = overhead wire electric

== Coaching stock ==
All of the railways coaches are wooden bodied, Victorian coaches.

- TR No.1 Open Balcony Coach ex GWR Van
- TR No.2 Open Balcony Coach ex GWR van
- TR No.3 Open Coach with Guards Van eX LNER Ballast brake van
- TR No.4 Open Coach with Guards Van ex LNER Ballast brake van
- TR No.5 Compartment Coach. Originally a GNR Coach
- TR No.6 Compartment Coach. Originally a GNR Coach
- TR No.7 Open Poppleton Coach with Guards Van. Originally an NER Director's Saloon
- TR No.8 Compartment Coach with Guards Van. Originally an MS&L Brake Van
- NER No.256 Compartment Coach built 1878
- NER No.818 Compartment Coach
- NER No.A15 Compartment bogie carriage

The railway also has other unrestored coaching stock.

== Additional photographs ==
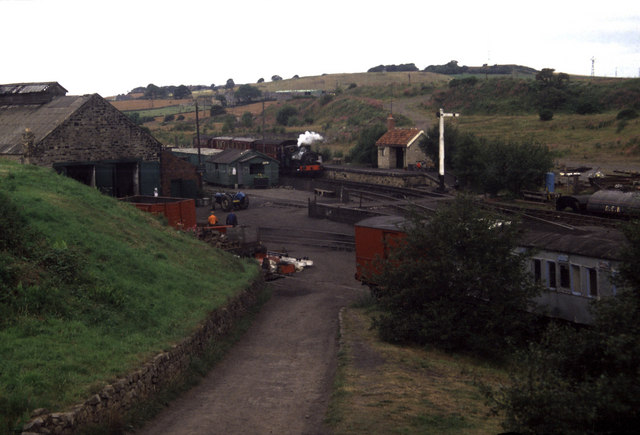
Marley Hill yard

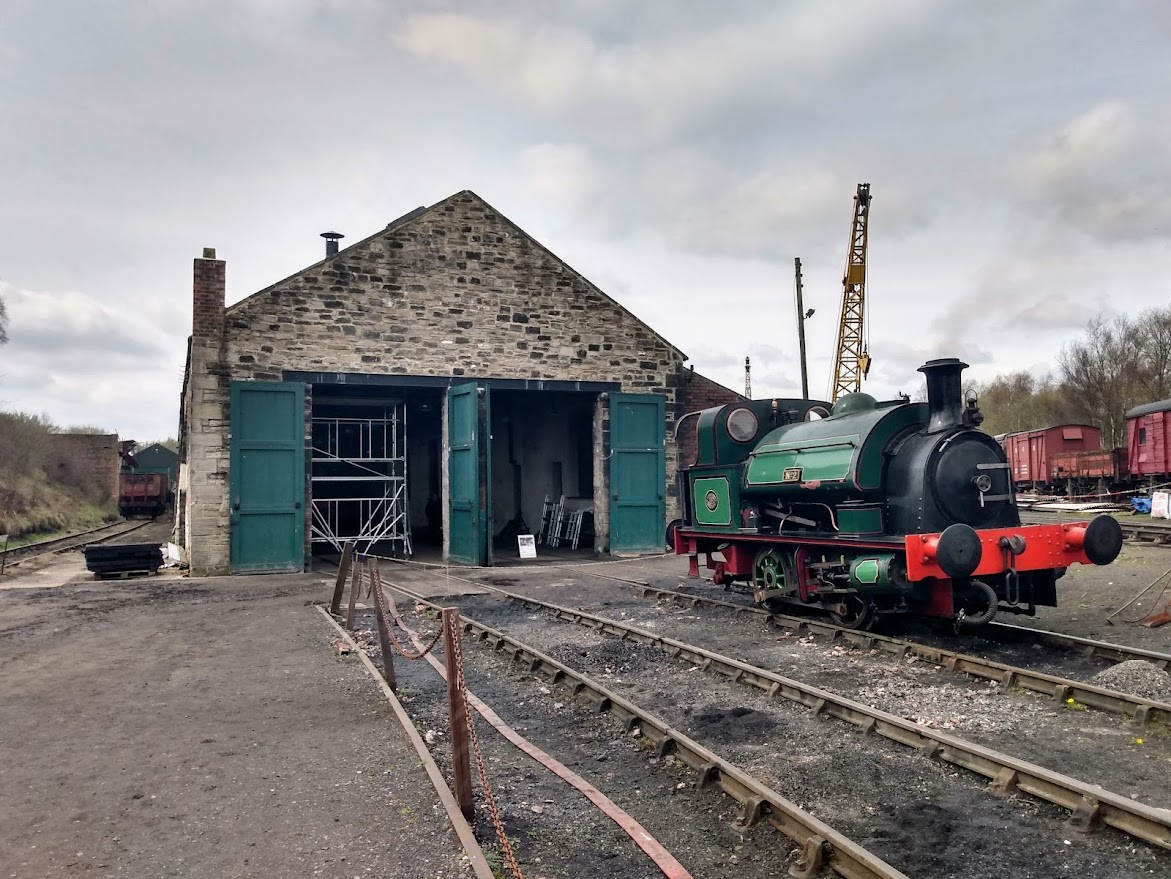
Marley Hill engine shed

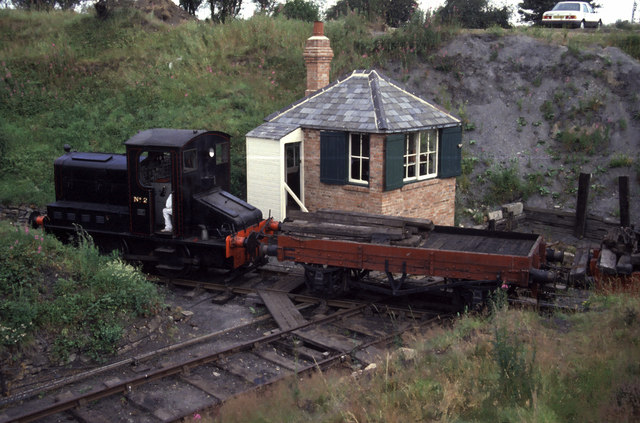
Diesel works train passing Marley Signal box on the running line. A headshunt from Marley Yard crossed the line here for a few yards before it was lifted in 2012.
