= Byermoor =

Village in Tyne and Wear, England

Coordinates: 54.9126°N 1.7091°W

- Location within Tyne and Wear
- Metropolitan borough: Gateshead
- Metropolitan county: Tyne and Wear
- Region: North East
- Country: England
- Sovereign state: United Kingdom
- Post town: Newcastle upon Tyne
- Postcode district: NE16
- Dialling code: 01207

Byermoor is a village near Burnopfield and Sunniside in the Gateshead district, in the county of Tyne and Wear, England. The village has a population of around 100 and contains a school (Sacred Heart) and a church. The village sits on the South side of the A692 on a ridge overlooking the Derwent Valley and the nearby village of Burnopfield. It is the last village on the old turnpike road to Wolsingham before it reaches the border with County Durham.

Byermoor colliery occupied the area to the South of the church prior to closure in 1968, along with four terraces built to house its workforce. Nearest to the A692 were Double Row and New Row and beyond these, Pit Row and Furnace Row. The only one of these houses to survive is the former colliery manager's house that stood at the Eastern end of New Row and was considerably larger than the others. One of the colliery's reservoirs stood alongside this, and the site of the reservoir is now occupied by some small industrial units. The access road to these was originally built as access to Double Row and the colliery itself, while just to the South of this, the road that served New Row is still in place, albeit fenced off and overgrown from a couple of yards beyond the junction with the main road.

The remaining housing sits to the North of the church and is made up mainly of semi-detached houses (Ravensworth Crescent, Gibside Crescent, Strathmore Crescent and Bowes Crescent) built by Whickham Urban District Council between 1920 and 1922, as well as a row of four houses constructed around the same time by John Bowes & Partners (at the time the owners of the colliery and the Bowes Railway) to house colliery officials. These are accessed via the lane that originally led to High Marley Hill School, and now continues only a short distance from the end of Bowes Crescent, before becoming a footpath leading to the still extant school building. The school was attended by non-catholic children from the village up until its closure in 1960 due to falling pupil numbers, a fate which also befell the nearby Marley Hill Primary School in 2010.

The Collieries and associated coke ovens at Byermoor and Marley Hill were the only significant local sources of employment for the inhabitants of the village, with residents now travelling further afield by car or bus for work. Bus services from Consett and Stanley pass through the village on their way to Newcastle, some via the Team Valley and Gateshead town centre, and some via Whickham and the MetroCentre transport interchange, along with a single bus between Rowlands Gill and the Team Valley early on weekday mornings, returning via the same route in the evening.

Although the village had a railway for many years, there was never a passenger service, with the only rail traffic being wagons to and from the colliery and coke ovens and coal traffic from other collieries passing through - either North on its way to the staithes at Jarrow, or unwashed coal from the screens at Marley Hill and Blackburn Fell heading South to the washery at the Hobson Pit about a mile away. This through traffic also ceased not long after the closure of the colliery when the Hobson Pit (which had for some time been the only remaining colliery on the line beyond Byermoor) ceased production later the same year.
