= Whickham =

Coordinates: 54°56′46″N 1°40′34″W

- Village
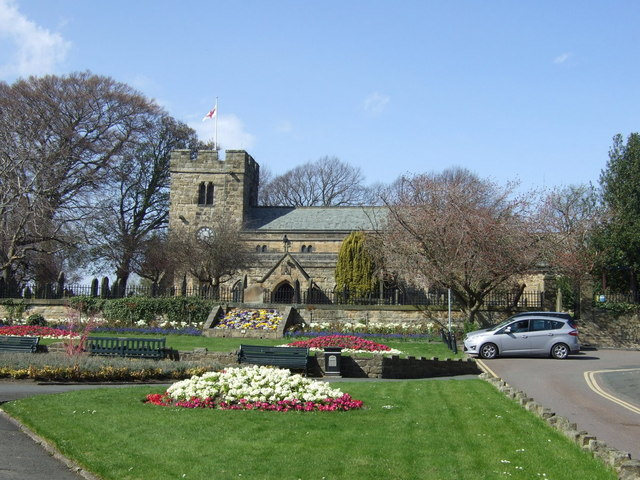
- St Mary the Virgin church, Whickham

- Location within Tyne and Wear
- Population: 16,652 (2011 census)
- OS grid reference: NZ208613
- Metropolitan borough: Gateshead
- Metropolitan county: Tyne and Wear
- Region: North East
- Country: England
- Sovereign state: United Kingdom
- Post town: Newcastle Upon Tyne
- Postcode district: NE16
- Dialling code: 0191
- Police: Northumbria
- Fire: Tyne and Wear
- Ambulance: North East
- UK Parliament: Gateshead Central and Whickham

Whickham is a village in the Borough of Gateshead in Tyne and Wear, North East England, historically in the county of Durham. The village is on high ground overlooking the River Tyne and 5 miles (8 km) south-west of Newcastle upon Tyne.

== History ==
Whickham underwent some expansion in the 1950s when the Lakes Estate was built just off Whickham Highway. Then later in the decade the Oakfield Estate just off Whaggs Lane was built. Grange Estate began the long-term development by JT Bell (Bellway), the builder, who went on to build Clavering Park, Clavering Grange, the Cedars and then Fellside Park.

In central Whickham, near Front Street, is Chase Park, the former residence of Whickham Chase. The property included a manor house, which was demolished in 1960. The park includes King George's Field, in which is a historic tower that is now closed off from the public. The large play area was restored in 2017 with funding from the Heritage Lottery Fund and the Big Lottery Fund, which included the removal of a large slide and the remodelling of the children's play area, as well as the replanting of Chase Park's many flower beds.

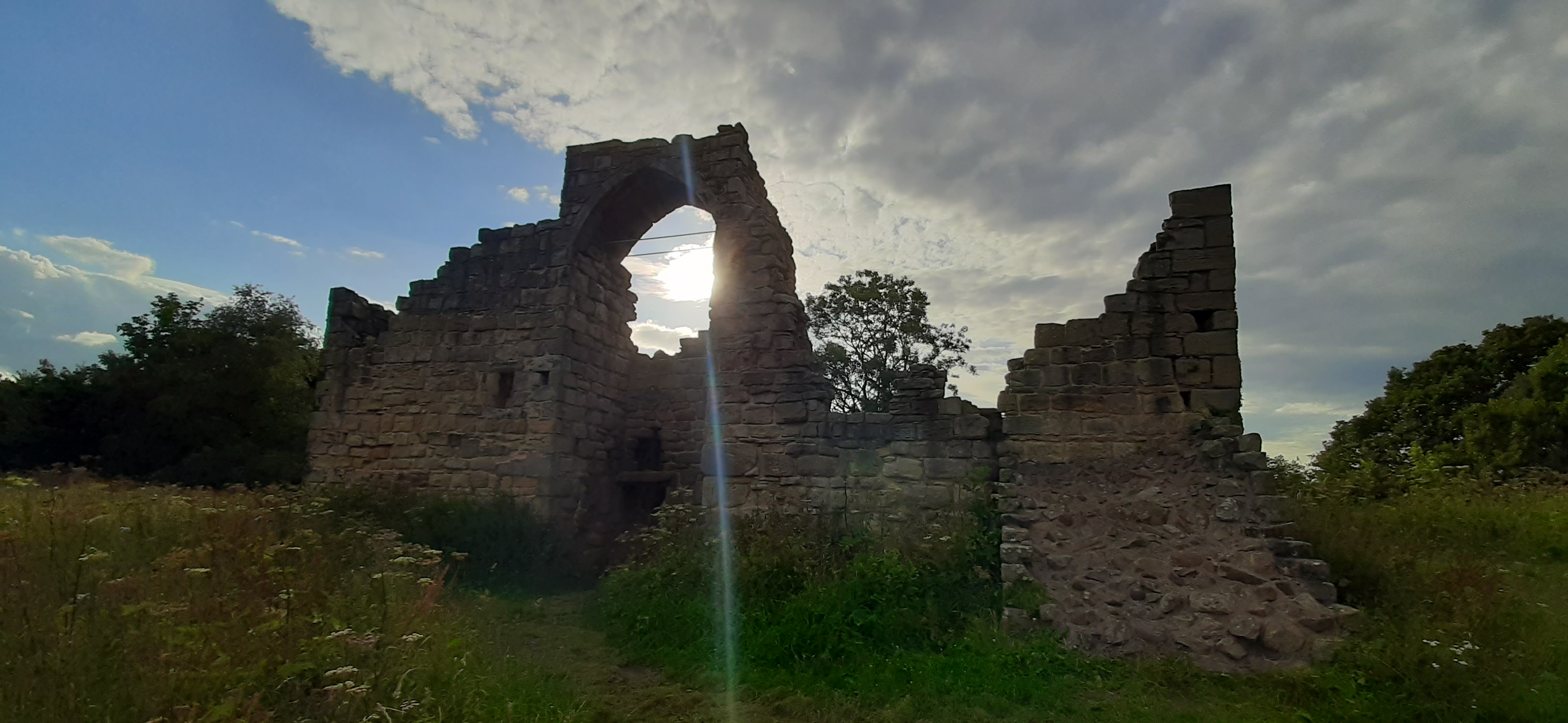
The Ruin of Hollinside Manor House

South-west of Whickham, above the River Derwent, are the ruins of Old Hollinside, a fortified manor house once owned by the Bowes-Lyon family.

== Sports ==
Whickham Glebe Sports Club is home to Whickham F.C., a football club in the Northern League Division One. They won the FA Vase in 1981.

== Governance ==
Whickham was anciently a township and parish within County Durham. Whickham Urban District, created in 1894, also covered the parishes of Dunston, Marley Hill and Byermoor, and Swalwell. Changes to local government in 1974 saw the parish and urban district abolished and replaced by an unparished area, at first within Tyne and Wear, then from 1986 within the Metropolitan Borough of Gateshead.

Whickham spans three electoral wards: Whickham North, Dunston Hill and Whickham East, and Whickham South and Sunniside (which extends south-west to include Marley Hill and Byermoor). Each ward elects three members of Gateshead Council. For national government elections it has been part of Gateshead Central and Whickham constituency since 2024, formerly being part of Blaydon constituency.

== Schools ==
Whickham has six primary schools and one secondary school. The secondary school is Whickham School and Sports College. The Gibside School for special educational needs and disabilities moved to a new location away from Whickham in spring 2021.

The primary schools are:

- Clover Hill Primary School
- Fellside Primary School
- Front Street Primary School
- St Mary's R C Primary School
- Washingwell Primary School
- Whickham Parochial C of E Primary School

== Notable people ==
- Peter Walters (born 1952, Whickham), Football League goalkeeper

== See also ==
- Washing Wells Roman Fort
