= List of places in Sunderland =

This is a list of suburbs and places of interest in the City of Sunderland, Tyne and Wear, England.

== Suburbs ==
=== North of the River Wear ===
- Carley Hill
- Castletown
- Downhill
- Fatfield
- Fulwell
- Hylton Castle
- Marina
- Marley Pots
- Monkwearmouth
- North Hylton
- Redhouse
- Roker
- Seaburn
- Sheepfolds
- Southwick
- Springwell Village
- Town End Farm
- Witherwack

=== South of the River Wear ===
- Ashbrooke
- Ayres Quay
- Barnes
- Christchurch
- City Centre
- Deptford
- Doxford Park
- East End
- Farringdon
- Ford Estate
- Gilley Law
- Grangetown
- Grindon
- Grove
- Hall Farm
- Hastings Hill
- Hendon
- The Herringtons
- Hill View
- Hollycarrside
- Leechmere
- Mill Hill
- Millfield
- Moorside
- Newbottle
- Nookside
- Pallion
- Pennywell
- Penshaw
- Plains Farm
- Ryhope
- Silksworth
- Shiney Row
- South Hylton
- Springwell
- Sunderland Docks
- Sunniside
- Thorney Close
- Thornhill
- Tunstall
- Warden Law
- Vaux

== Places of interest ==
Key
	Abbey/Priory/Cathedral
Accessible open space	Accessible open space
	Amusement/Theme Park
	Castle
Country Park	Country Park
	English Heritage
	Forestry Commission
Heritage railway	Heritage railway
Historic house	Historic House
Places of Worship	Places of Worship
Museum (free) Museum	Museum (free/not free)
National Trust	National Trust
	Theatre
	Zoo

- Fulwell Mill
- Herrington Country Park
- Hylton Castle
- Monkwearmouth Station Museum
- Mowbray Park
- National Glass Centre
- North East Aircraft Museum
- Northern Gallery for Contemporary Art
- Penshaw Monument
- Roker Park
- Roker beach
- Ryhope Engines Museum
- Seaburn beach
- Souter Lighthouse
- Sunderland Empire Theatre
- Sunderland Museum and Winter Gardens
- Stadium of Light
- Sunderland Volunteer Life Brigade Museum
- St. Peters Church (World heritage site applicant)
- Washington 'F' Pit museum
- Washington Old Hall
- Wildfowl & Wetlands Trust
