= Herrington Country Park =

Country park in Sunderland, England

- Herrington Country Park, looking towards Penshaw Monument.

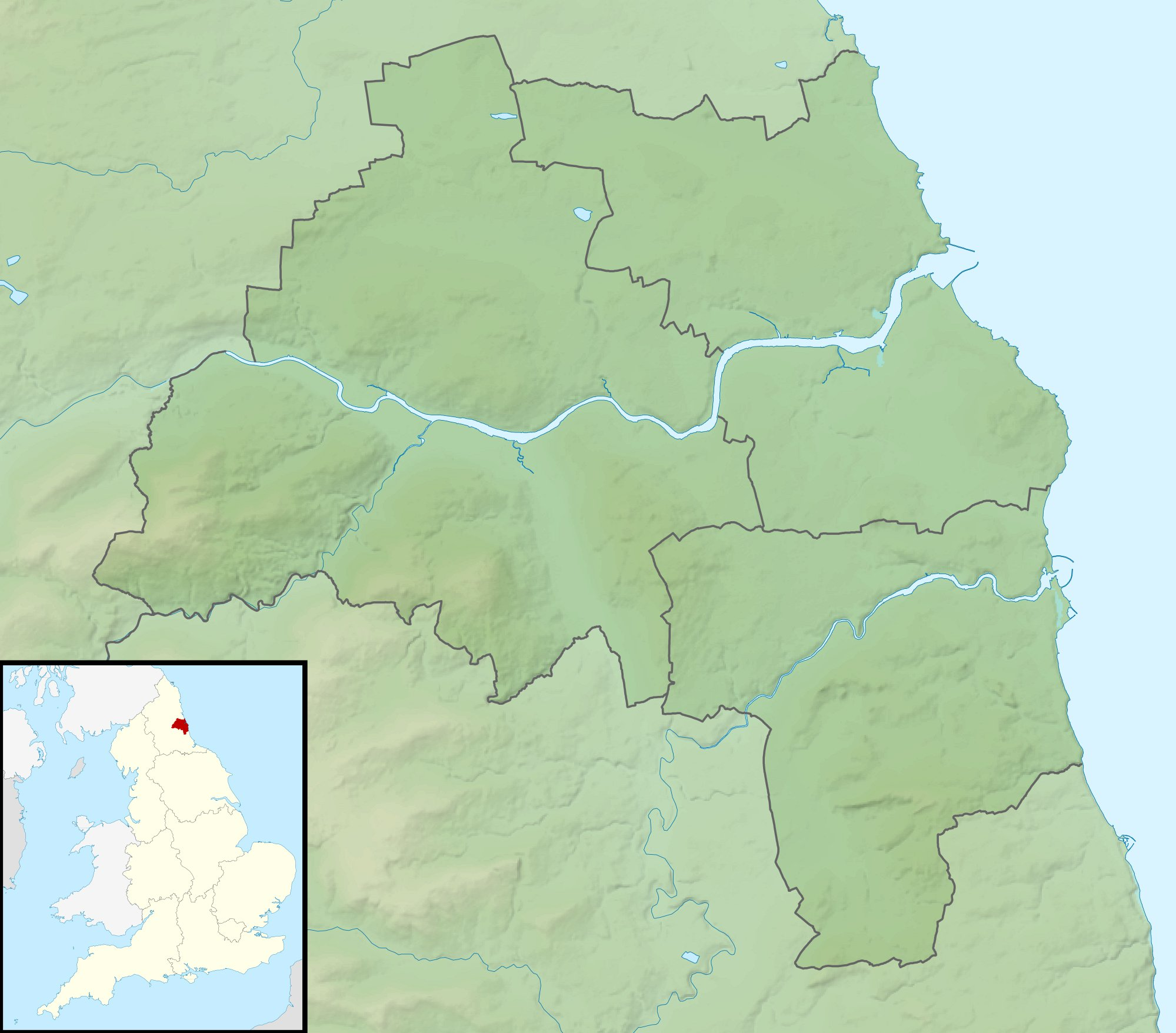
- Location within Tyne and Wear
- Interactive map of Herrington Country Park
- Type: Country park
- Location: Sunderland, United Kingdom
- Coordinates: 54°52′38″N 1°28′13″W

‘’‘Herrington Country Park’’’ is a country park and open public space in Herrington, Sunderland, Tyne and Wear. Located adjacent to Penshaw Monument, the park was built on the site of a former colliery. The park has developed into a significant home for wildlife, hosting up to 100 species of birds."History of Herrington Country Park". PicturesofEngland.com. The park also includes a play area, sculptures, an amphitheatre, and a model boat sailing site at the lake."Herrington Country Park | See it Do it Sunderland". www.seeitdoitsunderland.co.uk."Herrington Country Park - Places to go". Lets Go With The Children.

The park has hosted several major events, including Lets Rock, the UKs largest retro festival brand in 2018 and 2019, and BBC Radio 1’s Big Weekend in 2005 with Gwen Stefani, Foo Fighters and the Black Eyed Peas, and 2026 with Fatboy Slim, Zara Larsson and Olivia Dean,"Sunderland Home Page - Sunderland City Council". BBC Radio One. as well as the Olympic Torch Relay in 2012."Weekend of Fire and Water as thousands welcome the Olympic Torch in Sunderland and Durham". Sunderland Echo. It also acts as the venue for the local Kubix Festival since 2018."Kubix Music Festival Herrington Country Park". Kubix.

From 2024 the Kubix Rock Festival is being rebranded to Monument Festival."Events – Monument Festival". www.monumentfestival.co.uk.

Since 20 July 2019, the park has held a free weekly 5km parkrun on a Saturday morning starting at 9 am."course | Herrington Country parkrun". www.parkrun.org.uk.

== See also ==
- Mowbray Park
- Barnes Park
