= Penshaw =

Coordinates: 54°52′33″N 1°29′05″W

- Village
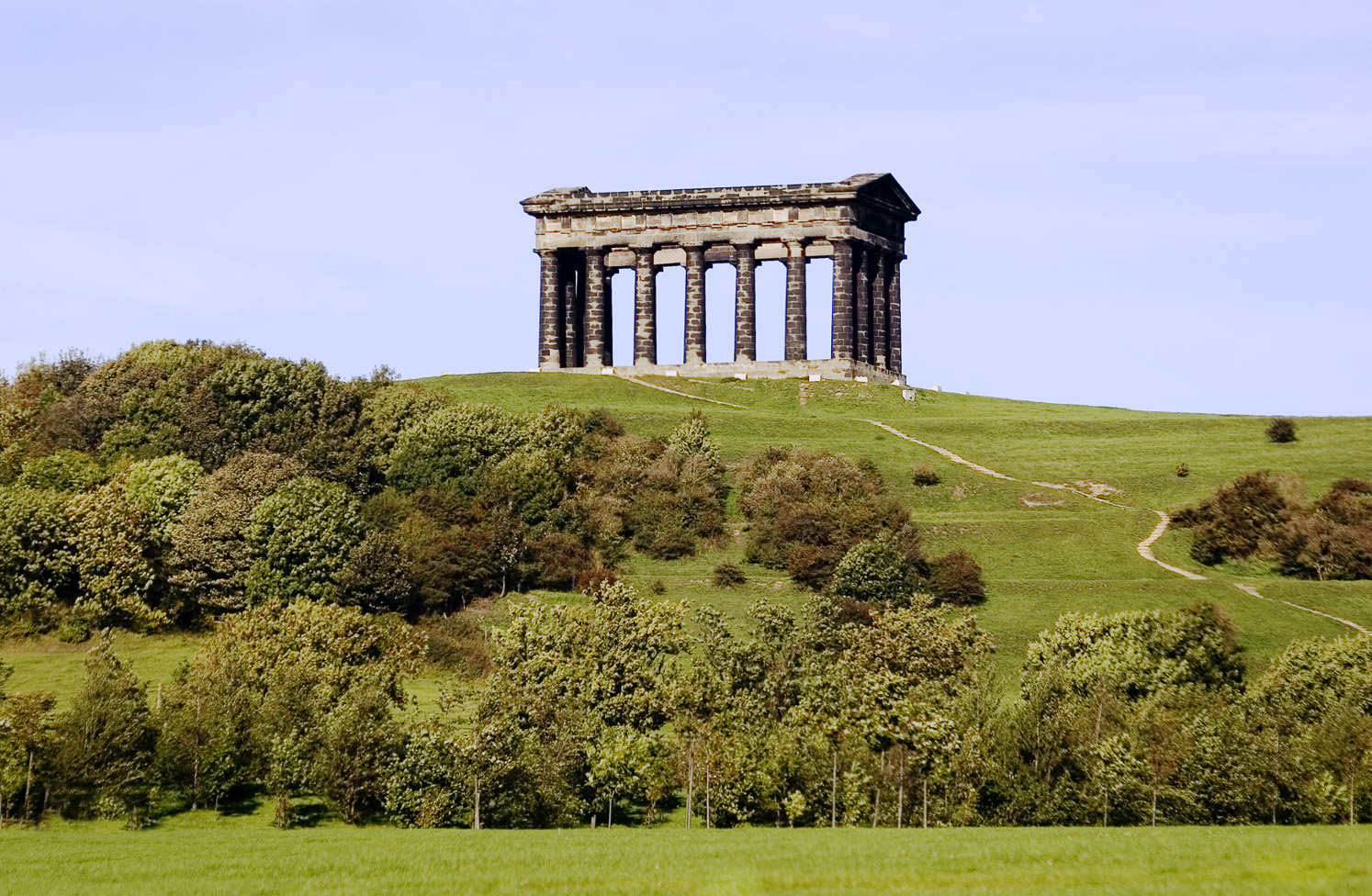
- Penshaw Monument, from Herrington Country Park

- Location within Tyne and Wear
- Metropolitan borough: Sunderland
- Metropolitan county: Tyne and Wear
- Region: North East
- Country: England
- Sovereign state: United Kingdom
- Post town: HOUGHTON LE SPRING
- Postcode district: DH4
- Dialling code: 0191
- Police: Northumbria
- Fire: Tyne and Wear
- Ambulance: North East
- UK Parliament: Houghton and Sunderland South

Penshaw locally /ˈpɛnʃə/, formerly known as Painshaw or Pensher is a village in the metropolitan district of Sunderland, in Tyne and Wear, England. Historically, Penshaw was located in County Durham.

== Name and etymology ==
The name Penshaw was recorded in the 1190s as Pencher and is of Cumbric origin. The first element is *pen, meaning 'hill' or 'summit' and the second *cerr/*carr - 'stone, hard surface', however, there is evidence of the location being continuously populated for well over 2000 years, as there are rumours that the hill Penshaw Monument sits on is the site of an ancient Iron Age hillfort.

== History ==
Penshaw was formerly a township and chapelry in the parish of Houghton-le-Spring, in 1866 Penshaw became a separate civil parish, on 1 April 1937 the parish was abolished and merged with Houghton le Spring and Offerton. In 1931 the parish had a population of 7183.

== Features ==
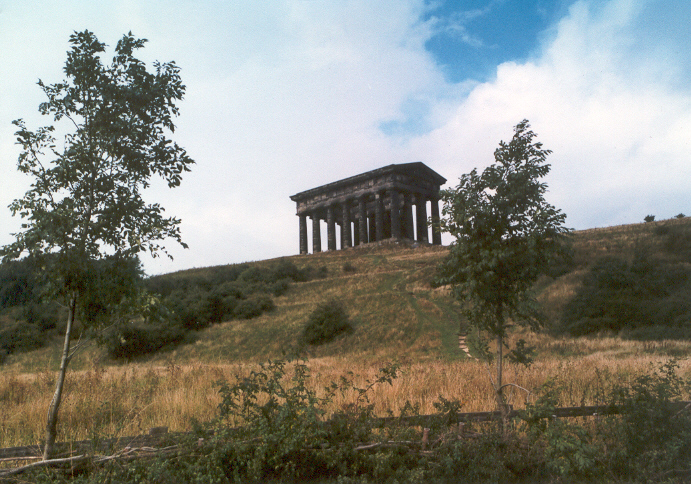
Penshaw Monument, from the south

Penshaw is well known locally for Penshaw Monument, a prominent landmark built in 1844 atop Penshaw Hill, which is a half-scale replica of the Temple of Hephaestus in Athens. Owing to its proximity to Durham City, the area was allocated a Durham postcode, DH4, which forms part of the Houghton-le-Spring post town. It lies about three miles north of Houghton-le-Spring, just over the River Wear from Washington. It borders Herrington Country Park and is surrounded by a series of villages: Herrington, Shiney Row, Biddick, Coxgreen and Offerton.

Leisure facilities include the easily accessible Herrington Country Park, which contains a play area, amphitheatre, skateboard park, lake with extensive wildlife and a memorial site to Herrington Colliery which once mined the site for coal. The site hosts public events such as the county show which includes dog shows, face painting and bouncy castles. There are three public houses, The Prospect (original name recently restored), The Monument (formerly The Ship) and The Grey Horse. Though no working men's club remains, a Catholic club is situated on Station Rd. Community facilities include Penshaw Community Centre and All Saints' Church Hall; both organise regular spring and summer events. In the village, at the foot of Penshaw Hill, is Penshaw Equestrian Centre. At the centre of Barnwell is an extensive playing field and young person's play area. Penshaw also has three primary schools within walking distance of one other: Barnwell, New Penshaw and Our Lady Queen of Peace Roman Catholic.

There are two annual events for children, an easter egg rolling competition on Penshaw Hill and a scarecrow hunt Scarecrow Trail Event organised by the village community.

An annual cross-country event takes place in May or June each year when Sunderland Harriers stage the Penshaw Hill Race with a presentation to the winner and runners up in The Monument public house after the race.

There are extensive views from the top of Penshaw Hill on a clear day: Durham Cathedral to the South West, the coast of Roker and Seaburn to the East and the Cheviot Hills to the North.

The Hill, as it is known locally, is rumoured to be a former Iron Age hillfort, also overlooks Wearside Golf Club, a long-established golf club originating in 1892 and Sunderland AFC's Stadium of Light can also be seen clearly from here; the football club's crest design includes the monument in silhouette.
