= Jack Middlemas =

English footballer

Personal information
- Full name: John Robert Middlemas
- Date of birth: 17 January 1896
- Place of birth: Easington, England
- Date of death: 24 April 1984 (aged 88)
- Height: 5 ft 8 in (1.73 m)
- Position: Wing half

Senior career*
Years	Team	Apps	(Gls)
	Herrington Swifts	?	(?)
	Blyth Spartans	?	(?)
1922–1923	Hull City	10	(0)
1923–1929	York City	228	(4)
	Blyth Spartans	?	(?)
- * Club domestic league appearances and goals

John Robert Middlemas (17 January 1896 – 24 April 1984) was an English footballer.

== Career ==
Easington-born Middlemas played for Herrington Swifts and Blyth Spartans before joining Hull City in March 1922. After making 10 league appearances for Hull, he joined York City in the summer of 1923. He made his debut for the club in the first game of the 1923–24 season against Scunthorpe United in the Midland League. He scored in York's first game in the FA Cup, which they won 2–1 against Castleford & Allerton United in September 1923. He was awarded a testimonial match against Middlesbrough in April 1929, which earned him £111. He left the club in July 1929 prior to York's first season in the Football League. He made a total of 259 appearances and scored five goals for the club. He then returned to Blyth Spartans.
