= Herrington =

Coordinates: 54.8709°N 1.4420°W

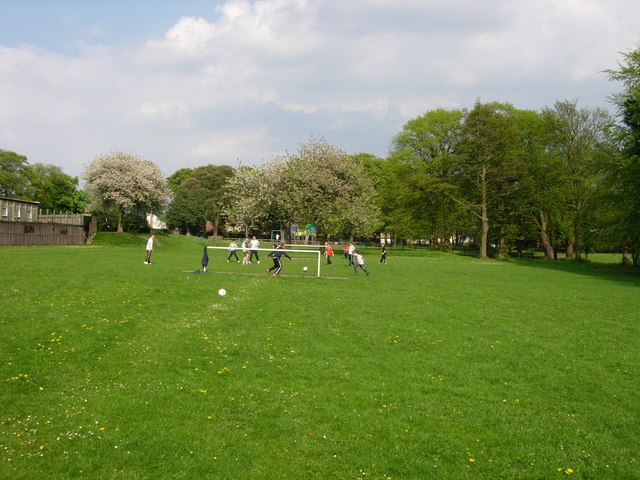
- Middle Herrington Park

- Location within Tyne and Wear
- Metropolitan borough: Sunderland
- Metropolitan county: Tyne and Wear
- Region: North East
- Country: England
- Sovereign state: United Kingdom
- Post town: SUNDERLAND
- Postcode district: SR3
- Dialling code: 0191
- Police: Northumbria
- Fire: Tyne and Wear
- Ambulance: North East
- UK Parliament: Sunderland South

Herrington is an area in the south of Sunderland, in Tyne and Wear, England, historically in County Durham.

The area includes the older village settlements of East Herrington, Middle Herrington and West Herrington, together with New Herrington. East and Middle Herrington are now largely residential, while West and New Herrington lie to the west of the A19 near Doxford International Business Park.

Herrington Burn flows through the area and is a tributary of the Lumley Park Burn, itself a tributary of the River Wear.

== History ==
The name Herrington is of Old English origin, although its precise derivation is uncertain. One suggested explanation links it with Old English *heeren, meaning "rocky", possibly in reference to Herrington Hill, which was later quarried. Another suggested derivation is from *hzering, connected with Old English heer, meaning "a rock, a height, a ridge".

Nearby Hasting Hill contains a scheduled Neolithic cursus and causewayed enclosure, with associated round barrows, indicating prehistoric activity in the surrounding landscape.

The historic Herrington settlements developed as a group of villages in County Durham. Two Herringtons were recorded by the late 11th century, and two parts of Herrington were included in the Boldon Buke, the 1183 survey of lands belonging to the Bishop of Durham.

Middle Herrington is first explicitly recorded in the 14th century, when it was associated with East Herrington and was held by Roger de Eshe. The estate later passed to the Lambton family in 1825. By 1855 the village had a two-row form and included Herrington Hall, outbuildings and a park.

Herrington Hall stood on the south side of the village street in Middle Herrington. It replaced an earlier building, whose surviving cellars were said to have been dated to 1570. The hall was rebuilt for William Beckwith around 1795, soon after he purchased the property from the Robinson family; it later passed to the Earls of Durham. It was sold to the Miners Welfare Commission in 1947, transferred to the National Coal Board in 1952, and demolished in 1957.

West Herrington is also recorded from the early 14th century. Its historic village layout, described as an irregular two-row plan with a green, partly survives, although many of the buildings have been rebuilt. West Herrington and West Park, Middle Herrington are both registered village greens. Medieval ridge and furrow earthworks survive between West and Middle Herrington, on both sides of Herrington Burn and in the park south of Middle Herrington.

In 1273, Sir Thomas de Herrington granted the manor of Houghall to the Church of St Cuthbert. In return, Richard de Claxton, Prior of Durham, granted him the chapel of St Cuthbert at Herrington. The chapel probably did not survive the dissolution of the chantries. In 1277, the Bishop of Durham granted Thomas of Herrington free warren in both Herringtons, Harraton and Houghall.

During World War II, a pair of pillbox structures were constructed c. 1940, each at Herrington and Stony Gate. Both pillboxes are Grade II listed buildings.

On 1 April 1946 Herrington became a civil parish, being formed from East and Middle Herrington, West Herrington and Silksworth. On 1 April 1967 the parish was abolished and merged with Sunderland and Houghton-le-Spring. In 1961 the parish had a population of 2,153.

== Herrington Country Park ==
Herrington Country Park was created on the site of the former Herrington Colliery. Its development began in the late 1990s and the park officially opened in 2001. The nearby Penshaw Monument stands on Penshaw Hill, with Herrington Country Park listed by the National Trust as nearby parking for the monument. The park has hosted the Durham County Show and the North East Motor Show. On 7 and 8 May 2005, Radio 1's Big Weekend was held at Herrington Country Park. In June 2012 the Olympic Torch Relay passed through Sunderland, and more than 4,000 people attended the Blue Peter Big Olympic Tour at Herrington Country Park.

== Sport ==
The football club Herrington Swifts was active in the early 20th century. Footballers who played for the club included Stanley Cowie, who started his career with Herrington Swifts before joining Blackpool in 1911, and Jack Middlemas, who played for Herrington Swifts before joining Blyth Spartans and Hull City.
