= List of schools in Sunderland =

This is a list of schools in the City of Sunderland, Tyne and Wear, England.

== State-funded schools ==
=== Primary schools ===
- Academy 360
- Albany Village Primary School
- Barmston Village Primary School
- Barnes Infant Academy
- Barnes Junior School
- Barnwell Academy
- Benedict Biscop CE Primary School
- Bernard Gilpin Primary School
- Bexhill Academy
- Biddick Primary School
- Blackfell Primary School
- Broadway Junior School
- Burnside Academy Inspires
- Castletown Primary School
- Christ's College
- Dame Dorothy Primary School
- Diamond Hall Infant Academy
- Diamond Hall Junior Academy
- Dubmire Primary
- Easington Lane Primary School
- East Herrington Primary Academy
- East Rainton Primary School
- English Martyrs' RC Primary School
- Eppleton Academy Primary School
- Farringdon Academy
- Fatfield Academy
- Fulwell Infant School Academy
- Fulwell Junior School
- George Washington Primary School
- Gillas Lane Primary Academy
- Grange Park Primary School
- Grangetown Primary School
- Grindon Infant School
- Hasting Hill Academy
- Hetton Lyons Primary School
- Hetton Primary School
- Highfield Academy
- Hill View Infant Academy
- Hill View Junior Academy
- Holley Park Academy
- Hudson Road Primary School
- Hylton Castle Primary School
- John F Kennedy Primary School
- Lambton Primary School
- Marlborough Primary School
- Mill Hill Primary School
- New Penshaw Academy
- New Silksworth Academy Infant
- New Silksworth Academy Junior
- Newbottle Primary Academy
- Northern Saints CE Academy
- Our Lady Queen of Peace RC Primary School
- Oxclose Primary Academy
- Plains Farm Academy
- Quarry View Primary School
- Redby Academy
- Richard Avenue Primary School
- Rickleton Primary School
- Ryhope Infant School Academy
- Ryhope Junior School
- St Anne's RC Primary School
- St Bede's RC Primary School
- St Benet's RC Primary School
- St Cuthbert's RC Primary School
- St John Bosco RC Primary School
- St John Boste RC Primary School
- St Joseph's RC Primary School, Sunderland
- St Joeseph's RC Primary School, Washington
- St Leonard's RC Primary School
- St Mary's RC Primary School
- St Michael's RC Primary School
- St Patrick's RC Primary School
- St Paul's CE Primary School
- Seaburn Dene Primary School
- Shiney Row Primary School
- South Hylton Primary Academy
- Southwick Community Primary School
- Springwell Village Primary School
- Thorney Close Primary School
- Town End Academy
- Usworth Colliery Primary School
- Valley Road Academy
- Wessington Primary School
- Willow Fields Community Primary School

=== Secondary schools ===
- Academy 360
- Biddick Academy
- Castle View Enterprise Academy
- Christ's College
- Farringdon Community Academy
- Hetton Academy
- Kepier School
- Monkwearmouth Academy
- Oxclose Community Academy
- Red House Academy
- St Aidan's Catholic Academy
- St Anthony's Girls' Catholic Academy
- St Robert of Newminster Catholic School
- Sandhill View Academy
- Southmoor Academy
- Thornhill Academy
- Venerable Bede Church of England Academy
- Washington Academy

=== Special and alternative schools ===
- Barbara Priestman Academy
- Beacon of Light School
- Columbia Grange School
- Harry Watts Academy
- The Link School
- North View Academy
- Portland Academy
- School Returners/Young Mums Provision
- Sunningdale School
- Trinity Academy New Bridge

=== Further education ===
- Sunderland College

== Independent schools ==
=== Senior and all-through schools ===
- Argyle House School

=== Special and alternative schools ===
- Ashbrooke School
- Hopespring Sunderland
- Thornhill Park School

=== Further education ===
- ESPA College
