= North Shore =

North Shore or Northshore may refer to:

== Geographic features ==
=== Australia ===
- North Shore (Sydney), a suburban region of Sydney
  - Electoral district of North Shore
  - North Shore railway line, Sydney
- Noosa North Shore, Queensland
- North Shore, New South Wales, a suburb of Port Macquarie
- North Shore, Victoria, a suburb of Geelong
  - North Shore railway station

=== Canada ===
- Côte-Nord, the region of Quebec and associated administrative region to the north of the lower Saint Lawrence River and the Gulf of Saint Lawrence
- North Shore (Greater Vancouver), several communities adjacent to Vancouver, British Columbia
  - North Shore Mountains, a subrange of the Pacific Ranges of the Coast Mountains including the mountains of the suburban North Shore of Greater Vancouver
- North Shore (Lake Superior), the area of Ontario north of Lake Superior
- North Shore (Montreal), suburban communities mainly North of the Rivière des Mille Îles, but also some across the lower end of Rivière des Prairies
- North Shore (New Brunswick), an area along the Bay of Chaleur including the Acadian Peninsula and the Miramichi Bay region
- North Shore, Nova Scotia (disambiguation)
- The North Shore, Ontario, township along the north shore of the North Channel (Lake Huron)
- North Shore, Prince Edward Island, a community in Prince Edward Island

=== New Zealand ===
- North Shore, New Zealand, a suburban area of Auckland

- North Shore City, a city that existed on the North Shore from 1989 to 2010

- North Shore (New Zealand electorate)

=== United Kingdom ===
- North Shore, Blackpool

=== United States ===
- North Shore, California
- North Shore (Chicago), Illinois
- North Shore (Jacksonville), Florida
- North Shore (Oʻahu), Hawaii
- North Shore, Louisiana
- North Shore (Massachusetts)
- North Shore (Duluth), Minnesota
- North Shore (Lake Superior), an area of Minnesota
- North Shore (Long Island), New York
- North Shore, Staten Island, New York
- North Shore (Pittsburgh), Pennsylvania
- North Shore, Wisconsin

== Arts and entertainment ==
- North Shore, a novel by Wallace Irwin, on which the dramatic film The Woman in Red (1935) was based
- North Shore (1949 film), a documentary short film
- North Shore (1987 film), a drama film set on the North Shore of Oahu
- North Shore (2004 TV series), a 2004–2005 prime-time soap opera set in Hawaii
- North Shore (2023 TV series), a crime-thriller set in Sydney
- "Northshore", a song off the Tegan and Sara album Sainthood
- "Northshore" ("The Awakeners, Volume 1") is a 1987 speculative fiction book by Sheri S. Tepper

== Education ==
- North Shore Community College, a community college in Danvers, Massachusetts
- North Shore Country Day School, a private high school located in Illinois
- Northshore High School, a high school located in Slidell, Louisiana
- Northshore School District, a school district in northern King County and southern Snohomish County, Washington
- North Shore Academy (disambiguation)

== Medical ==
- North Shore-LIJ Health System, a health-care organization based in New York
- North Shore University Hospital, a hospital located in Manhasset, New York
- NorthShore University HealthSystem, a health-care organizations based in Illinois
- Royal North Shore Hospital, a hospital in St. Leonards, NSW Australia

== Railways ==
- North Shore Line (disambiguation)
- North Shore Railroad (disambiguation)

== Sports ==
- North Shore Cheetahs, an amateur Bantam AAA Div. 2 football team in Montreal, Quebec
- North Shore Lions, an amateur Bantam AAA Div. 1 football team in Montreal, Quebec

== Other ==
- The Northshore, the largest apartment building in Austin, Texas
- North Shore Animal League America, a no-kill animal rescue and adoption organization, headquartered in Port Washington, New York

== See also ==
- North Shore Road (disambiguation)
- Lower North Shore (disambiguation)
