= Tony Harrington =

English football referee

- Born: 1983 or 1984 (age 42–43); Cleveland, Yorkshire, England

Domestic
Years	League	Role
2012–	English Football League	Referee
2021–	Premier League	Referee

Tony Harrington (born 1983 or 1984) is an English football referee who referees in the English Premier League. Harrington was promoted to Select Group 1 in June 2021.

== Early life ==
Tony Harrington was born in Cleveland.

== Career ==
Harrington began refereeing in the Teesside Junior Football Alliance aged 14, after completing a refereeing course whilst at school as part of The Duke of Edinburgh's Award.

After four years as an EFL assistant referee and four years as a National League referee, Harrington was appointed to the EFL Referees List at the start of the 2012–13 season.

Harrington was promoted to a Select Group 2 referee in 2016.

On 22 May 2021, Harrington refereed the 2021 FA Trophy Final at Wembley Stadium. Only eight days later, Harrington was back at Wembley when he officiated the 2021 EFL League One play-off final between Blackpool and Lincoln City.

After becoming a Select Group 1 referee in June 2021, Harrington officiated his first Premier League game on 16 December 2021.

== Personal life ==
Harrington attended Manor Community Academy for secondary school and English Martyrs School and Sixth Form College for sixth form. He is a fan of his hometown team Hartlepool United and is the grandson of former Hartlepool player Tommy McGuigan.

Prior to becoming a full-time referee, Harrington worked as a PE teacher at North Shore Academy.
