= Hendon Burn =

Stream in Tyne and Wear, England

Coordinates: 54.8930°N 1.3824°W

Hendon Burn in Backhouse Park, 2021

Hendon Burn is a stream flowing through Sunderland, Tyne and Wear. Serving as a drainage basin for most of the city's southern half, its route proceeds from Doxford Park through the Farringdon Country Park area and into Gilley Law, Silksworth, Barnes, Ashbrooke and Backhouse Park before reaching the sea at Hendon.

== See also ==
- Bishopwearmouth Burn
