= Farringdon Community Academy =

Location
- Allendale Road; Farringdon, Tyne and Wear, SR3 3EL; England; 54°52′23″N 1°25′39″W

Information
- Type: Academy
- Motto: Outcomes Focused, Child Centred
- Trust: Northern Education Trust
- Department for Education URN: 150268 Tables
- Ofsted: Reports
- Headteacher: Mr Tumelty
- Gender: Co-educational
- Age: 11 to 16
- Enrolment: 667 as of August 2023
- Website: http://www.farringdonschool.co.uk/

Farringdon Community Academy is a co-educational secondary school with academy status, located in the suburb of Farringdon in Sunderland, Tyne and Wear, England.

The school was built along with the estate of Farringdon in 1956. The school has undergone a number of changes, including the construction of new blocks of classrooms and a sports hall. It currently has 885 students.

It once acted as the main secondary school for the suburbs of Farringdon, Doxford Park, Silksworth and East Herrington. Its catchment area was reduced in 2003 following the completion of The Venerable Bede Church of England School in Tunstall.

In 2002, the school became the site of the Farringdon Jubilee Centre, a community centre for the residents of Farringdon partly funded by the school. The building includes facilities such as training rooms, computers and a crèche. It offers training and courses to local residents and is a meeting point for local residents and community groups. It hosts a regular community day four times a year, hosting the army, the RAF and many other organisations there.

Following the Education Act (2002), Farringdon became a specialist Sports College, which had always been a focus of the school in the past. Formally, it became known as a Farringdon Community Sports College. As a result, floodlit tennis courts and a pavilion with a dance studio and a large multi-gym have been built.

The school converted to academy status on 1 July 2013 and was renamed Farringdon Community Academy.

In 2018 the headteacher, Mr H. Kemp, retired and a new headteacher, Mr N. Holder, joined the school. Mr J. Bedford Became headteacher before leaving to Venna Academy as Mr Tumelty joined the school as the new headteacher

In September 2023 Farringdon Community Academy joined the Northern Education Trust.

== Notable former pupils ==
- Tony Jeffries - Olympic medal boxer
- Jordan Henderson MBE - Liverpool F.C. and England international footballer. UEFA Champions and Premier League Winner.
- James Baxter - professional actor (Emmerdale)
- Scott Borthwick- Durham cricketer
- Liam Agnew - Blyth Spartans footballer
