= Shore Line Railway =

Shore Line Railway or Shore Line Railroad may refer to:

- Shore Line East, a commuter rail service in Connecticut
- Shore Line Railway (Connecticut)
- Shore Line Railway (New Brunswick), Canada; see Prince of Wales, New Brunswick
- Shore Line Electric Railway, a former trolley line in Connecticut
- Shore Line Subdivision, a railroad line owned and operated by Grand Trunk Western Railroad
- Detroit and Toledo Shore Line Railroad

== See also ==
- Shoreline (disambiguation)
- North Shore Line (disambiguation), several railroads
- South Shore Line (disambiguation), several railroads
- Short-line railway, a railroad class
- Shortline railroad, railroads that operate over a relatively short distance
