= North Coast Railroad =

North Coast Railroad may refer to:

- North Coast Railroad Authority, owner of the former Northwestern Pacific Railroad in California
- North Coast Railroad (1992–1996), operator of the former Northwestern Pacific Railroad in California
- North Coast Railroad (Washington), predecessor of the Union Pacific Railroad in Washington
- North Pacific Coast Railroad, predecessor of the Northwestern Pacific Railroad in California

== See also ==
- North Shore Railroad (disambiguation)
