= Gilley Law =

Neighborhood of Sunderland, England

The Gilley Law Tower blocks and surrounding village

Gilley Law, otherwise known as Lakeside Village, is a neighbourhood in Sunderland, England.

== Geography ==
Gilley Law is situated to the Southwest of Sunderland City Centre and is bordered by Farringdon, New Silksworth and Doxford Park. The stream Hendon Burn runs directly through the suburb and goes underneath the housing area.

== Etymology ==
The term Gilley is derived from the old Norse term Gill, which refers to a form of valley or ravine, whilst "Law" refers to a hill. This makes the literal name of the suburb "Hill Valley".
