= Falcon Education Academies Trust =

Multi-academy trust in England

- Formation: August 1, 2019; 7 years ago
- Purpose: Education
- Headquarters: Leeds, United Kingdom
- Region served: England
- Website: www.falcontrust.co.uk

Falcon Education Academies Trust is a multi-academy trust (MAT) that operates four schools in England.

The trust was established in 2019 by the Department for Education. It was conceived as a specialist trust to turn around schools in the North of England with the most challenging educational under performance or financial problems, before transferring them to a permanent sponsor. The schools it takes on are typically ones which other MATs were unwilling to, due to "significant sustainability and infrastructure issues that present too great a risk to a MAT's own sustainability". Its remit was extended to cover all of England in 2021.

In 2023, the Department for Education notified the trust that it did not wish to continue the pilot, known as EdMAT, that encompassed Falcon. It intended to work with the trust to place its schools with other MATs before closing it.

== Schools ==
- King Solomon International Business School, Birmingham
- Oulton Academy, Leeds
- The William Allitt Academy, Swadlincote
- Thornaby Academy, Stockton-on-Tees
