= Lee Potter =

Lee Potter may refer to:

- Lee Potter (footballer), an English football player
- Cut La Roc, stage name of Lee Potter, a British electronic musician
