= Farringdon, Sunderland =

Suburb in Tyne and Wear, England

Coordinates: 54.8732°N 1.4238°W

Farringdon
- Pictured from top right clockwise: Arbroath Road, Anthony Road (Former site of Farringdon Hall), Abercorn Road, Farringdon Country Park

- Location within Tyne and Wear
- Population: 9,449 (2011 census) (Figure also includes neighbouring East & Middle Herrington as part of the St. Chad's Ward)
- Metropolitan borough: City of Sunderland
- Metropolitan county: Tyne and Wear
- Region: North East
- Country: England
- Sovereign state: United Kingdom
- Post town: Sunderland
- Postcode district: SR3
- Police: Northumbria
- Fire: Tyne and Wear
- Ambulance: North East
- UK Parliament: Houghton and Sunderland South

Farringdon is a suburb of Sunderland, Tyne and Wear, England. Originally a Monastic grange and manor estate for hundreds of years, Farringdon was rebuilt as a post-war council housing estate in the 1950s. It is approximately 3 mi (4.8 km) south of the city centre along the A690, close to Thorney Close, Silksworth, East Herrington, Gilley Law and Doxford Park. Electorally, the area comes under the St. Chad's ward of the City.

== Geology ==
The area of Sunderland Farringdon is built on was formed during the Permian period, and as per the wider region is theorized to have been a shallow carbonate sea. The bedrocks of the area consist of carbonate material including coral and shell fragments forming beds and local reefs. Above this near the surface lies significant clay deposits of a glacigenic origin which are over 2 million years old. The British Geological Survey memoir for this specific locality refers to the superficial deposits of the area as 'Complex drift of East Herrington and Silksworth', a thin sequence of bedded sand, gravels and clays.

== History ==
=== Pre-history ===
Recorded human activity on Farringdon has been dated to the Neolithic era, due to a stone axe uncovered during construction work in the 1950s.

=== The Middle Ages ===
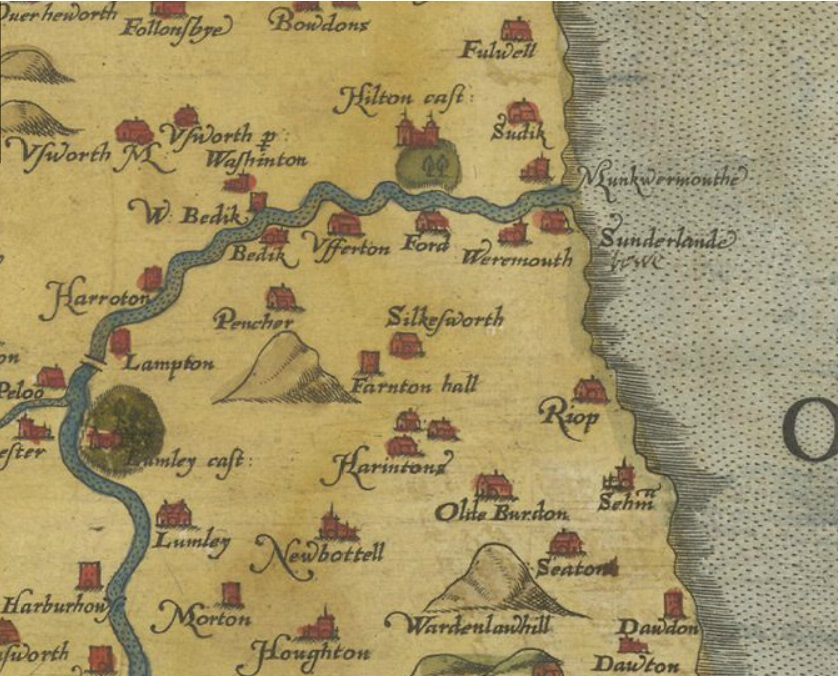
Farringdon in 1577, named as "Farnton Hall" on a map by Christopher Saxon which originally belonged to Elizabeth I's secretary of state

The parish of Bishopwearmouth in the Middle Ages was divided into a number of copyholdings held by custom of the Bishop of Durham, of which was delegated to various tenants. Farringdon emerged as a part of this system and operated as a block Demesne, whilst being also a hamlet and estate under the township of Silksworth.

The name derives from: "Farm or hill of Faer or his sons"; it had a variety of spellings throughout this period including Farnton Hall, Farrington Hall, Ffaernton and Ferenton Hall. By the 15th century, it served as a Monastic Grange of the priory of Hexham.

In the 1420s, the land was represented by Robert Jackson who served as bailiff of Sunderland and collected taxes on behalf of the Bishop of Durham. By 1479 the Black Book of Hexham detailed the area as possessing cottage lands, a windmill, an oven and brewery A new manor was built on the land in 1597; it disappeared by the mid 20th century.

=== Renaissance and early modern period ===
Following the Dissolution of the monasteries the Farringdon Monastic Grange was returned to the crown and later granted to Sir John Forster by Queen Elizabeth I. The estate would pass on to other owners throughout this period, including George Blakiston, and the Pepper family of North Yorkshire.

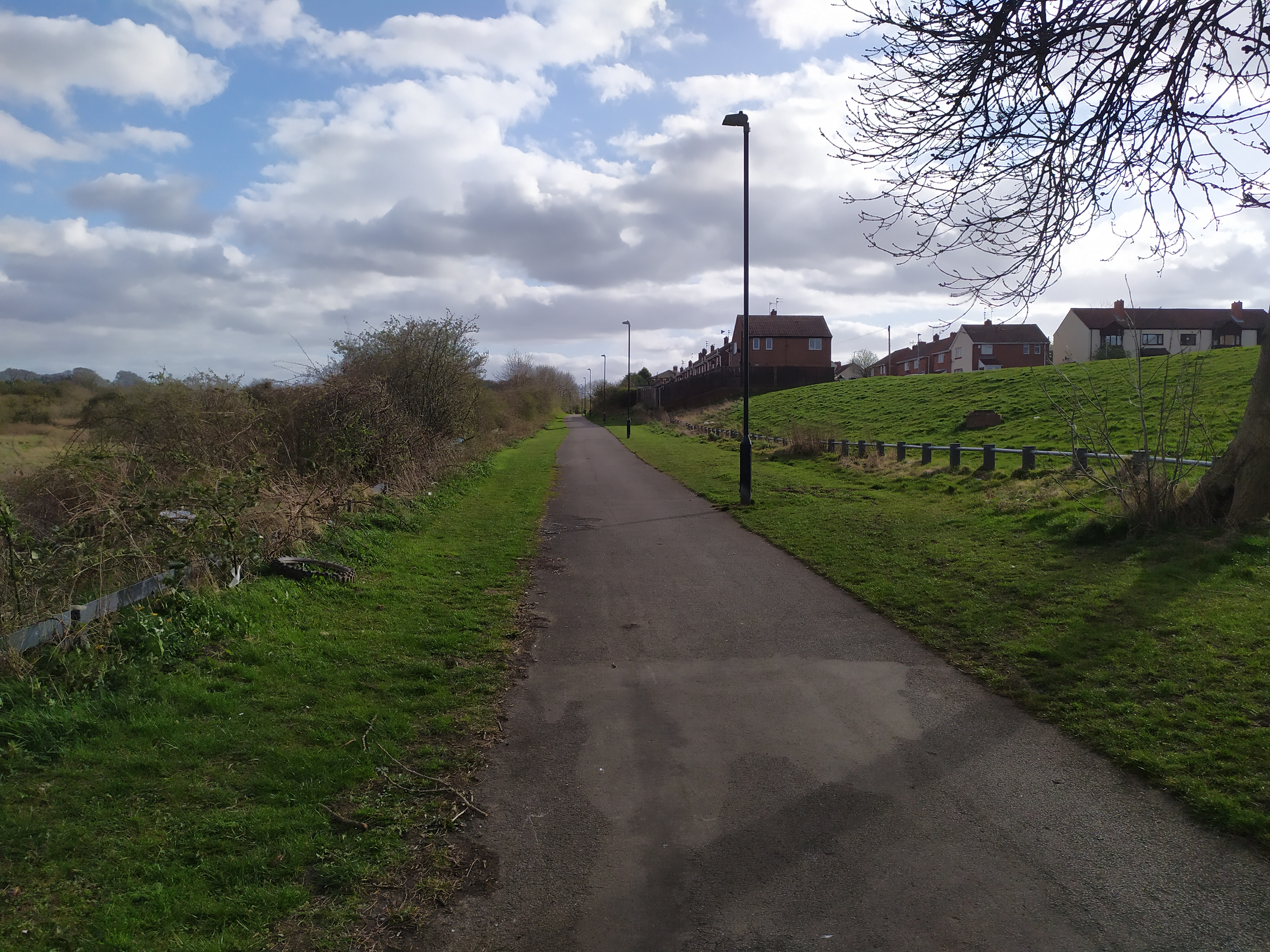
The former route of the Hetton Colliery Railway Through Farringdon

During the English Civil War the Scottish Army crossed the River Wear at South Hylton and set up their headquarters at Farringdon Hall.

In the mid 19th century, the Hetton Colliery Railway, one of the first operational railways in history and the first of its kind to transport coal, passed through Farringdon and Gilley Law en route to the River Wear. A rail trail has been established along the former route.

=== The modern housing estate ===
A photo of the former Farringdon Hall building, dated 1940

The manor and farm existed on the land until the 20th century. In 1950, Sunderland authorities purchased 208.69 acres (84.45 ha) and set out plans for the creation of a new estate consisting of over 1,400 houses, creating today's Farringdon. The last private owners of the estate were Robert Moorhead and George Lee, who were publicly critical of the pace at which the land was acquired and developed. Herrington Parish Council also resisted the estate, lodging protests with Durham County Planners.

By the end of the century, many of the homes on the estate had been privately purchased through the Right to Buy scheme. In 1998, Sunderland City Council proposed the creation of Farringdon Country Park, a designated recreational and conservation space neighbouring the suburb.

== Education ==
Farringdon is home to two schools. A large secondary school (Farringdon Community Academy) which serves a catchment area also consisting of Doxford Park, East Herrington and New Silksworth as well as a primary school (Farringdon Primary School).

== Amenities ==
Farringdon is home to a single pub known as The Dolphin, which has been voted Sunderland's "pub of the year" for five years running. The former Farringdon Social Club closed in 2017 and has since been redeveloped into a supermarket

The estate also possesses three shopping arcades, two which are based on Allendale Road and the other on Ashdown Road, as well as a McDonalds and a Simply local supermarket. The former Farringdon Hall police station, which was closed in 2015, was redeveloped into a new business park consisting of a Greggs, B&M and a Costa Coffee

== Politics ==
Farringdon is a component of the St. Chad's Ward in the city alongside parts of Herrington. As of 2026, the area is represented by three councillors from Reform UK Labour MP Bridget Phillipson has represented Farringdon as part of the Houghton and Sunderland South constituency since it was created in 2010.
