= Sunderland Minster =

- Church of St Michael and All Angels and St Benedict Biscop
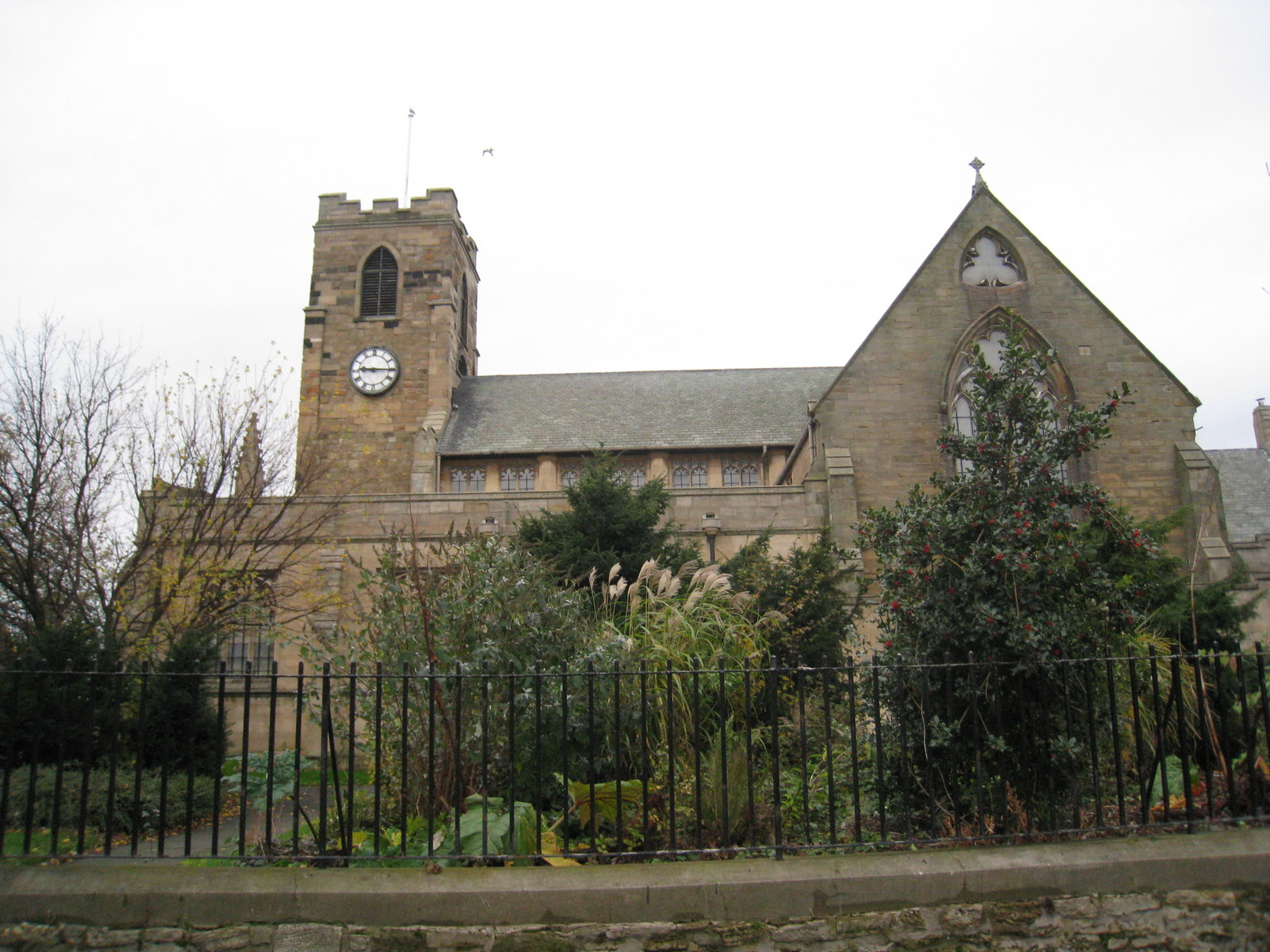
- Sunderland Minster

- Sunderland Minster shown within Tyne and Wear
- 54.906°N 1.388°W
- OS grid reference: NZ393570
- Location: Sunderland
- Country: England
- Denomination: Anglican

History
- Status: "Civic church" (extra-parochial former parish church)

Architecture
- Functional status: Active
- Heritage designation: Grade II* listed

Administration
- Province: York
- Diocese: Durham

The Minster Church of St Michael and All Angels and St Benedict Biscop (commonly known as Sunderland Minster) is the minster church of Sunderland, Tyne and Wear, England. Formerly known as "St Michael & All Angels' Church", it served as the parish church for Bishopwearmouth, but was renamed in January 1998 after Sunderland was granted city status. In May 2007 the Minster ceased to be the parish church of Bishopwearmouth and the village is now a suburb of Sunderland. Sunderland Minster is part of the Greater Churches Group.

== History ==
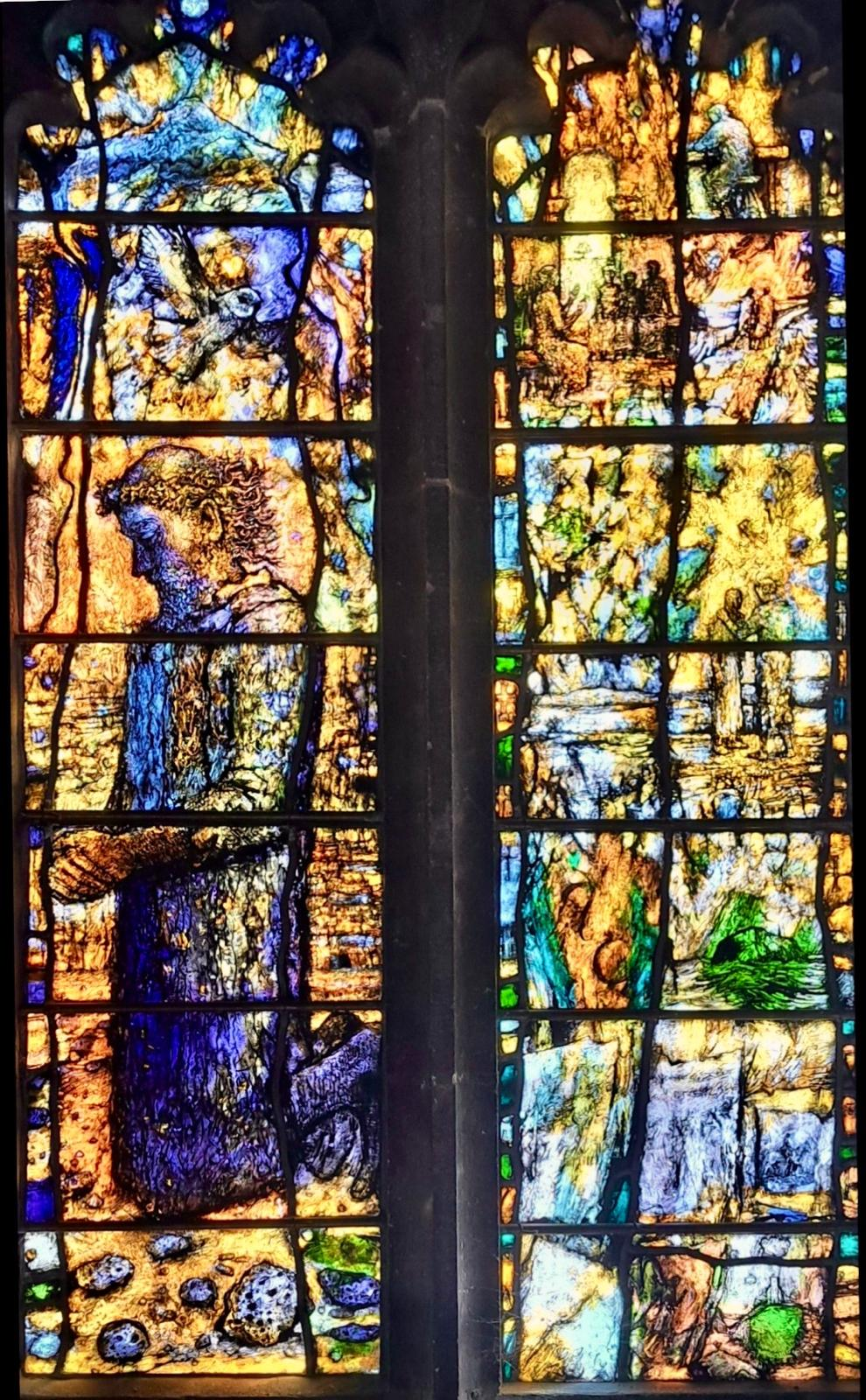
One of three windows by Thomas Denny located in the Bede Chapel

A church dedicated to St Michael & All Angels has stood on this site for over a thousand years. For most of that time, it was known as 'Bishopwearmouth Parish Church'. The parish of Bishopwearmouth, south of the River Wear was founded in around 940AD, with an original stone church being built shortly afterwards. The first evidence of a church on the site arose in a 1930s excavation when Saxon stones were found. Due to colliery subsidence, the church was virtually re-built beyond recognition in the early 20th century, but not all parts of the former church were lost.

In 1998, following the grant of City status, the church was redesignated as 'Sunderland Minster': the second Minster church in England since the Reformation (following Dewsbury Minster in West Yorkshire in 1994).

The Bede Chapel, located south of the chancel, has three modern stained-glass windows designed and made by the artist Thomas Denny, which were installed in 2006. The windows depict the contemplative and active lives of Bede and Benedict Biscop, against imagery depicting the history, landscape and community of Sunderland.

In May 2007, with the adoption of Benedict Biscop as Sunderland's Patron Saint, the church was redesignated as an Extra Parochial Place with the addition of St Benedict Biscop in its title.

It is a Grade II* listed building.

== Role of the Minster ==
Until May 2007 the team of ministers carried out traditional parish duties as well as serving the city by hosting services of remembrance, providing chaplaincies for the retail and industrial workforces in the city centre, as well as being used by the University chaplaincy. It continues to play host to special services and worship events for the whole city, as it did for many years as Bishopwearmouth Parish Church. In 2007 the Minster ended its parish role, and these functions were transferred to the Parish Churches of St Nicholas and St Ignatius. Since then the Minster describes itself as "A church for the whole City".

== See also ==
- Holy Trinity Church, Sunderland
- Bishopwearmouth Rectory
