= North Shore Academy =

North Shore Academy or Northshore Academy may refer to:

- Northshore Academy, Beverly, an alternative high school in Beverly, Massachusetts, United States
- North Shore Academy, Stockton-on-Tees, a secondary school in Stockton-on-Tees, England
- Northshore Christian Academy, a private elementary and middle school in Everett, Washington, United States

== See also ==
- North Shore (disambiguation)
