= Kirk Balk Academy =

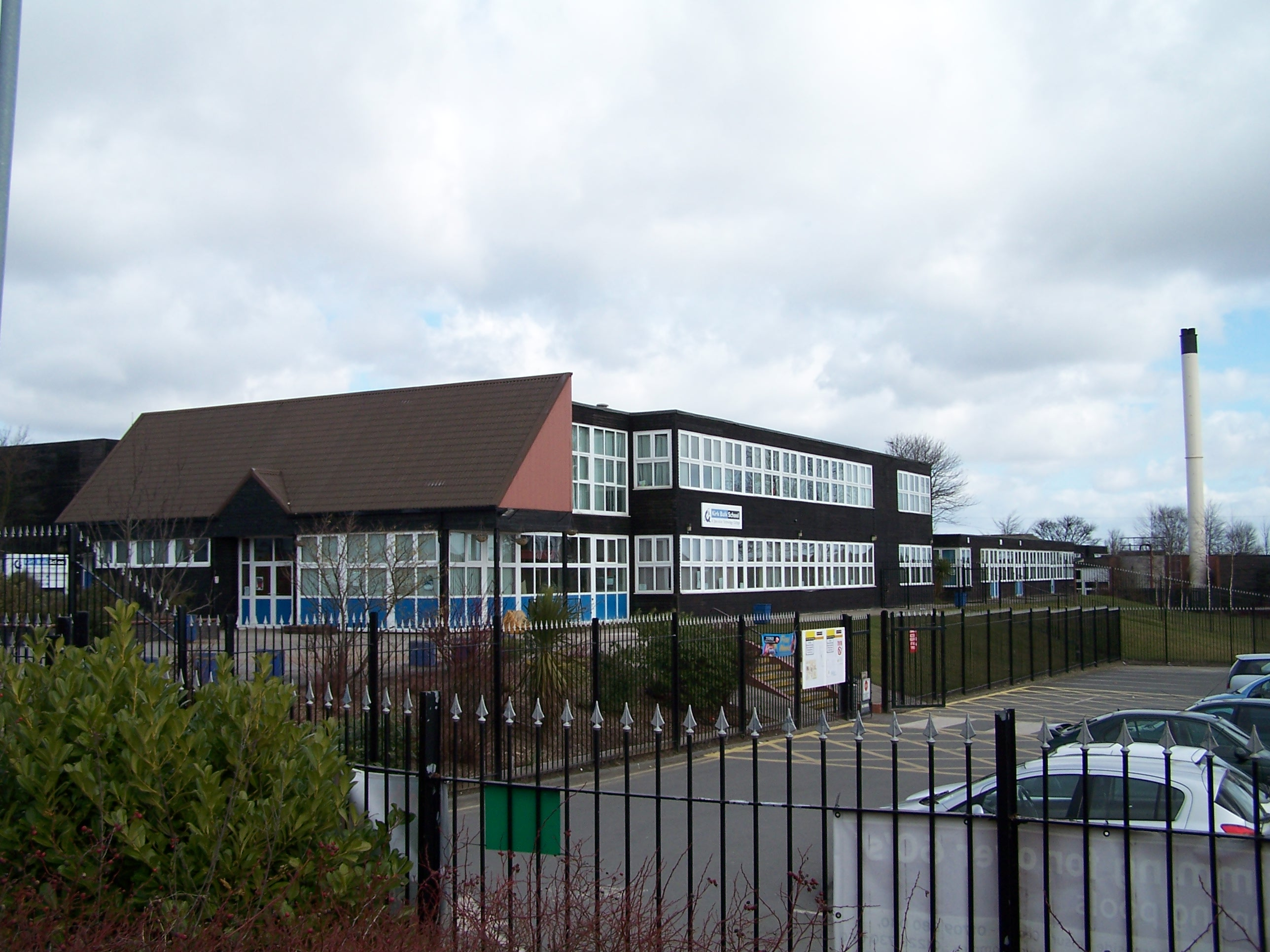
- School buildings in 2010, outdated building rebuilt

Location
- West Street; Hoyland; Barnsley, South Yorkshire, S74 9HX; England; 53.50136°N 1.44939°W

Information
- Type: Academy
- Established: 1933
- Local authority: Barnsley
- Trust: Northern Education Trust
- Department for Education URN: 140979 Tables
- Ofsted: Reports
- Chief Executive: Rob Tarn
- Principal: Richard Whitfield
- Gender: Mixed
- Age: 11 to 16
- Enrolment: 1,250
- Colours: Dark Blue, Purple, Green, Yellow, Red
- Website: kba.northerneducationtrust.org

Kirk Balk Academy is a secondary school located in Barnsley, South Yorkshire, England. It is part of the Northern Education Trust. The school mainly serves students living in its immediate area: Birdwell, Hoyland, Jump, Tankersley, Elsecar, Wombwell and Pilley.

The school is an 11–16 academy teaching a wide curriculum in lower school (Y7-9) with a variety of qualifications in the upper school (Y10-11), such as GCSE and BTEC.

== History ==
=== Secondary modern school ===
Hoyland Kirk Balk School opened in 1933. Extension were built around 1964 by Charles R. Price, which opened in September 1965. The extensions were officially opened on Wednesday 4 May 1966 by the Bishop of Sheffield, Right Rev. F. J. Taylor. Construction had taken over two years. It became a coeducational school, from two schools

=== Comprehensive ===
It became comprehensive in September 1968, but the sixth form was at other schools, and still is today. A sports centre was built from 1971, which opened on 9 December 1974, with a licensed bar.

From September 1975 local people could also attend Brampton Ellis Comprehensive School. In September 1976 the long-serving headmistress left, and a no-nonsense former Army officer took over, and at a governors meeting announced that he wanted to restore the cane. But parents and governors were less enthusiastic. He wanted to cane vandals and people who caused graffiti. The chairman of the 24 governors was Allen McKay, a former miner, later the local Labour MP, who supported the headmaster.

=== Academy ===
Construction of a new building for the school was finished in late 2011, allowing for the demolition of the old building. This made space for a new school sports field. Additionally, the school changed its name from Kirk Balk School to Kirk Balk Community College, changing the logo and uniform in the process. In September 2014, the school was renamed Kirk Balk Academy, and in March 2015 it was formally converted to academy status, sponsored by the Northern Education Trust. In September 2016, Ms Jo Nolan became the Executive Principal of Kirk Balk Academy until 2018, when she was replaced by Mr Dean Buckley.

=== Visits ===
- Cliff Richard visited on Monday 18 December 1972, to give an hour-long talk on Christianity; Mr Robertson the Religious Education teacher knew Cliff Richard from youth work when at London University, and both of them knew the Christian actor Nigel Goodwin
- Cosmonaut Aleksandr Aleksandrovich Volkov visited on Monday 11 April 1988; it was connected to Barnsley being twinned with Horlivka in Ukraine, from May 1987
- On the morning of Wednesday 6 July 2011, Prince Edward, Duke of Kent visited

== House System ==
Kirk Balk Academy had 4 houses:

- Rosalind Franklin House (Red)
- Pablo Picasso House (Yellow)
- Leonardo da Vinci House (Green)
- William Shakespeare House (Blue)

Each house has its own ethos, guiding standards, and routines which help develop a family culture.

== Events ==
The school hosts a whole school inter-house sports day in the last week of term each year. Students represent their Forms in athletic track and field events. Students also can compete through taking part in a range of other team sports, such as football, rounders, and tennis.

== Timetable ==
The school timetable consists of one set week. This provides a variety of lessons, so that the pupils receive the correct number of hours in a lesson each week. The school day starts at 8:20am and finishes at 2:30pm. A wide range of enrichment activities are run from 2:30pm to 3:30pm, and can help students to further develop their academic progress.

== Ofsted Inspection ==
In the latest Ofsted inspection (January 2020), the school was rated as good.

| Area | Grade |
|---|---|
| The quality of education | Good |
| Behaviour and attitudes | Good |
| Personal development | Good |
| Leadership and management | Good |

== Notable former pupils ==
=== Secondary modern ===
- Allen McKay, local Labour MP from 1978–92

=== Comprehensive ===
- Ian Swallow, cricketer

== Former teachers ==
- Barry Hines taught in the late 1960s and early 1970s; in March 1977 a 16 year old girl at the school starred in the BBC television play The Price of Coal, that Barry Hines had written
