= Allan Graham (footballer) =

English footballer

Personal information
- Date of birth: 23 October 1937
- Place of birth: Ryhope, England
- Position: Full-back

Youth career
- 1954–1955: Silksworth Juniors

Senior career*
Years	Team	Apps	(Gls)
1955–1958	Sunderland	3	(0)
1958–19??	Horden Colliery Welfare		
- * Club domestic league appearances and goals

Allan Graham (born 23 October 1937) was an English professional footballer who played as a full-back for Sunderland.
