= Hetton =

Hetton may refer to several places in England:

- Hetton, North Yorkshire, a village
- Hetton-le-Hole, a town in Hetton parish, Sunderland
  - Hetton railway station
  - Hetton colliery railway

== See also ==
- Hetton Academy, Sunderland
- South Hetton, County Durham
