= Doxford Park =

Suburb of Sunderland, England

Coordinates: 54.8618°N 1.4227°W

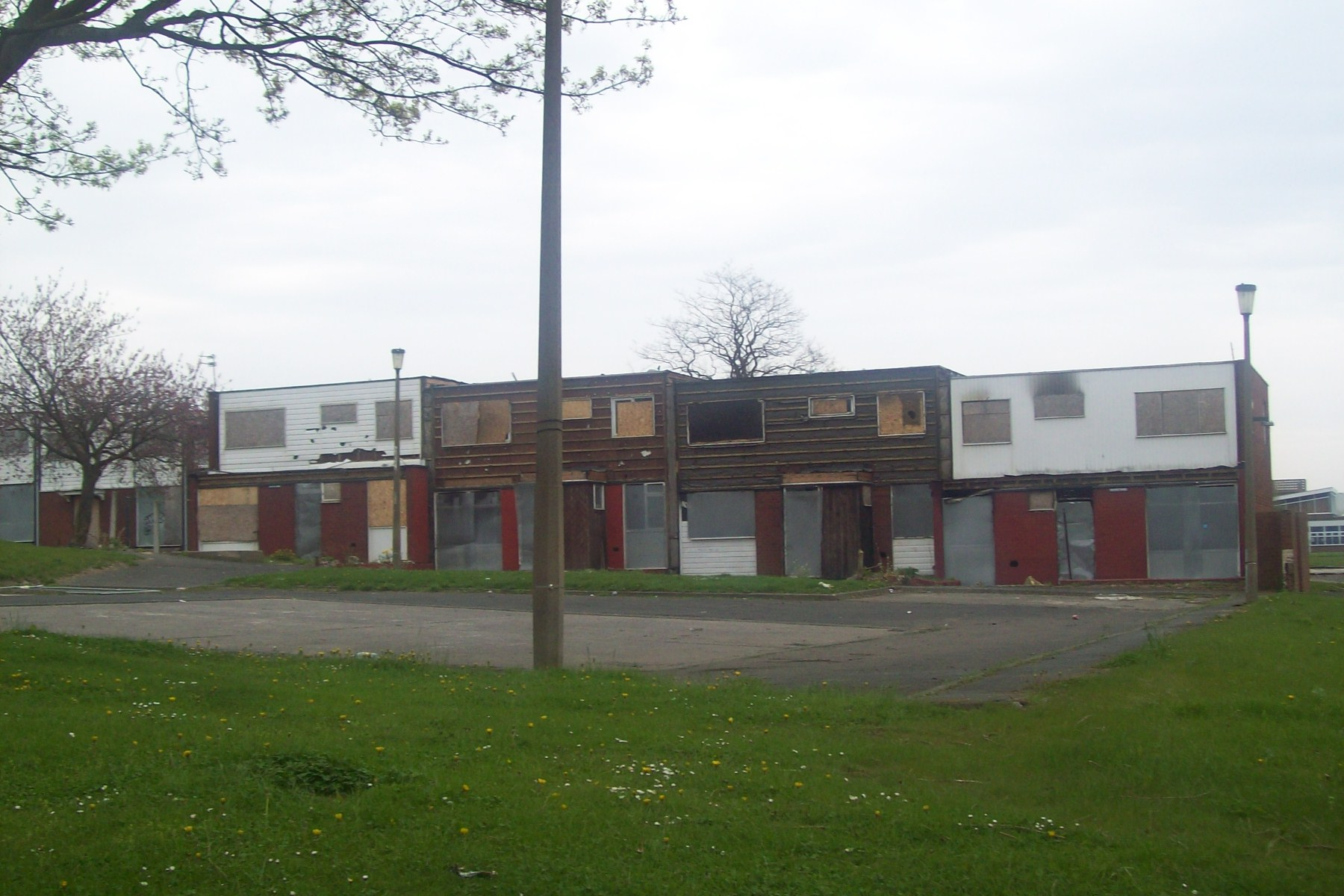
- Boarded up, flat-roofed houses in Doxford Park

- Location within Tyne and Wear
- Population: 9,870 (2011. City Of Sunderland Ward population)
- OS grid reference: NZ375525
- Metropolitan borough: City of Sunderland
- Metropolitan county: Tyne and Wear
- Region: North East
- Country: England
- Sovereign state: United Kingdom
- Post town: SUNDERLAND
- Postcode district: SR2, SR3
- Dialling code: 0191
- Police: Northumbria
- Fire: Tyne and Wear
- Ambulance: North East
- UK Parliament: Houghton and Sunderland South

Doxford Park (also known as Doxford or locally as Doxy [Park]) is a suburb of Sunderland, Tyne and Wear, located to the south-west of the city centre. Once part of the historical township of Silksworth in the Middle Ages, Doxford Park consisted of agrarian land and a manor before being constructed into a modern housing estate in the 1960s. Surrounded by the A19, the suburb now houses one of the city's largest business districts, the Doxford International Business Park.

== History ==
The area that is now Doxford Park and the surrounding suburbs was part of the historical township of Silksworth of which was a part of Bishopwearmouth. It was composed of farmland which ultimately belonged to the church, as did neighbouring Farringdon. Its modern name was derived from the Doxford Family who later acquired the land and the historic Doxford Hall. The Doxford family were pivotal in Sunderland's maritime and engineering history, founding Sunderland's shipyard William Doxford & Sons.

=== Regeneration ===
From the 21st century onwards, Doxford Park experienced massive revival with its signature "box" like housing demolished and large scale private development pursued. Renamed 'Beckwith Green' the development has been split into 6 phases with phases 1 to 3 of the project now complete. The plans for Phase 4 include 40 extra care apartments, 40 apartments and 14 bungalows. The aim is to create a village where residents can continue to live independently but with support always to hand.

Planning permission for phase 5 of the regeneration program was submitted to Sunderland Council in Nov 2012 - however there has been no confirmation from Gentoo as to when construction on phase 5 will commence.

At the centre of the suburb lies a shopping centre built in the late 1970s and initially named the President Carter Shopping Centre, after U.S. President Jimmy Carter following an official visit to the region in 1977. Following redevelopment in mid-1990s the centre is now a large Morrisons supermarket.

Doxford Park is home to four schools, Mill Hill Primary School, Benedict Bischop Church of England Acedemy, Sunningdale School (SEN) and the Portland School for children with special needs was opened in the Chapelgarth area in December 2001 by Prime Minister Tony Blair. For secondary education, most children from the area go to Farringdon Community Academy and Venerable Bede Church of England Academy.

== Transport ==
Doxford Park is served by the 4 and 13 bus routes. The nearest railway station based on travel time is Seaham, although Sunderland is closer geographically.

The transport company Arriva, who operate across Europe, are based in Doxford Park.
