= Tunstall, Sunderland =

Suburb of Sunderland, Tyne & Wear, England

Coordinates: 54.874063°N 1.390161°W

Tunstall
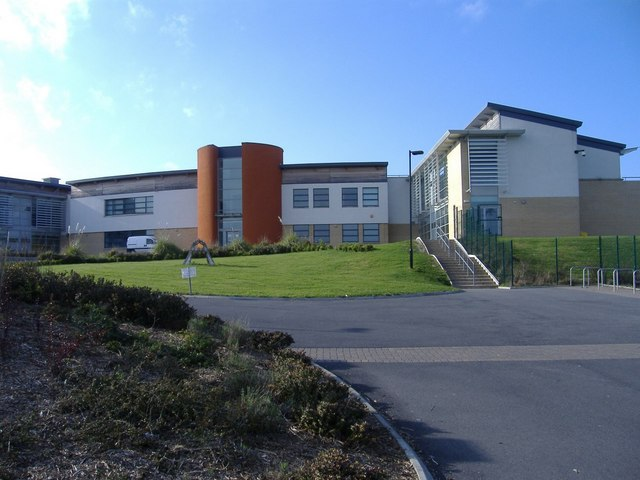
- Venerable Bede school

- Location within Tyne and Wear
- Metropolitan borough: Sunderland
- Metropolitan county: Tyne and Wear
- Region: North East
- Country: England
- Sovereign state: United Kingdom
- Post town: SUNDERLAND
- Postcode district: SR3
- Dialling code: 0191
- Police: Northumbria
- Fire: Tyne and Wear
- Ambulance: North East
- UK Parliament: Sunderland South

Tunstall is a suburb of Sunderland, Tyne and Wear, England which is mostly a privately purchased estate. It is located to the west of Ryhope, and east of Silksworth. The area was built around a large hill, known as Tunstall Hill. Since 1966 pilgrims have erected crucifixes on the hill every Good Friday.

It is the location of Venerable Bede Church of England Academy, which is on the former site of Ryhope Colliery and later Ryhope golf course.

== History ==
Tunstall is a village that has been present since the early middle ages, first mentioned in the 1183 Norman era Boldon Book the contemporary village green continues to mirror its medieval shape. By the 14th century, Hatfield's survey of Durham recorded 12 tenants in the village who held 110 acres of block demesne lands, with 14 dwellings, a mill and two cottages on the land.

Tunstall was formerly a township in the parish of Bishop-Wearmouth, in 1866 Tunstall became a separate civil parish, on 1 April 1967 the parish was abolished and merged with Sunderland. In 1961 the parish had a population of 6566. In 1974 it became part of the metropolitan district of Sunderland.
