= Ryhope pit pony statue =

The Ryhope pit pony statues were two statues, one bronze and one metal, of a pit pony on the entrance signs to the village of Ryhope in the City of Sunderland in Tyne and Wear.

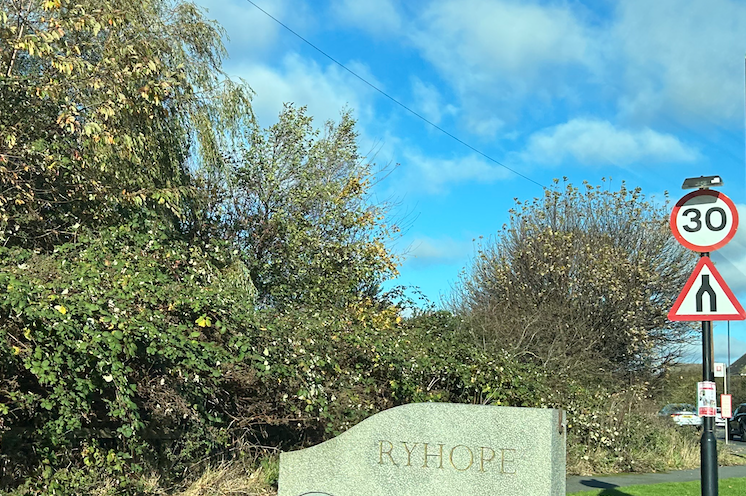

The first statues stood on the two entrance signs erected on Stockton Road in Ryhope in 2009, known as the Ryhope Gateway Signs. The signs were commissioned by the Ryhope Development Trust in 2009. The statue was sculpted by Andrew Butler. The two gateway signs are carved from sandstone with 'RYHOPE' inscribed in gold lettering.

Ryhope is a former mining village and the pony represented the many pit ponies that would have worked underground in the area

Butler's original bronze statue of a pit pony was stolen for a second time in October 2021. It had been stolen on a previous occasion but subsequently returned. In 2023 Sunderland City Council said that it was "not aware of any plans or funding at this point in time for [the statue] to be replaced" and that its theft was "sad". It had not been recovered as of 2023. In 2023 Northumbria Police said the case of the theft remained open and asked anyone with information to contact them.

The statue was originally replaced with a wire mesh and plaster statue of a horse made by pupils at Ryhope Infant School in November 2021 shortly after its theft in October. Children in Year 1 made the shape of the horse, with the wire moulding made by pupils in Year 2 and the finished sculpture was painted by children in nursery classes. The plaster moulding was made by children in Reception. However, the Infant School's sculpture was also stolen and/or destroyed.

The replacement of the empty plinth with a toy model of a horse went viral online in 2023. Teddy bears and other toys have subsequently been added, with some also stolen. A rocking horse stood on the plinth in June 2023.

In August 2024 the second, separate pit pony statue was stolen. The local council said that a replacement of the bronze statue could cost more than £34,000. In October 2024, the replacement of the first pit poney was dislodged and placed behind the base of the statue, making it the third time the statue had been removed.

A bronze replacement of the first statue was placed on the plinth in 2024. However, by the summer of 2024 this replacement bronze statue was also stolen, leaving the plinth empty for a fourth time.
