= Lee Potter (footballer) =

English footballer (born 1978)

Personal information
- Full name: Lee Potter
- Date of birth: 3 September 1978 (age 48)
- Place of birth: Salford, England
- Position: Forward

Senior career*
Years	Team	Apps	(Gls)
1997–2000	Bolton Wanderers	0	(0)
1999–2000	→ Halifax Town (loan)	6	(2)
2000–2001	Halifax Town	16	(0)
2001	Chester City	0	(0)
2001–2002	Bradford Park Avenue		
2002–20??	Radcliffe Borough	12	(6)
- * Club domestic league appearances and goals

Lee Potter (born 3 September 1978) is an English former professional footballer who played as a forward in the Football League for Halifax Town.

== Life and career ==
Lee Potter was born on 3 September 1978 in Salford, Greater Manchester. He was raised in Farnworth, and attended George Tomlinson School. As a youngster, he attracted attention from numerous clubs, and trained for a couple of weeks with Manchester United, before joining the centre of excellence at Bolton Wanderers, the club he supported. After leaving school, Potter did a YTS traineeship with Bolton, and then signed professional forms in 1997. His 1998–99 season was disrupted by injury: a cracked fibula was followed by a knee injury sustained in training.

Potter joined Football League Third Division club Halifax Town on loan in mid-December 1999. He scored on debut on a 2–1 loss to Chester City, and his diving header secured a 1–0 win away to league leaders Rotherham United, before the deal was made permanent in January 2000 for a £30,000 fee. Potter made a further 13 appearances by the end of the season, initially starting at centre forward but later coming off the bench, and failed to score. He made only three substitute appearances the following season before being transfer-listed in December. Bolton missed out on the final instalment of his fee because he had not made the required 25 appearances. Reported interest from clubs including Kidderminster Harriers, Macclesfield Town and Yeovil Town came to nothing, and he eventually joined Chester City in September 2001. He claimed afterwards that he had been "treated like a dog" while at Halifax.

Potter's only appearance before he was released by Chester City came in the Cheshire Senior Cup. He signed for Bradford Park Avenue in December 2001. He played regularly, contributing to Park Avenue reaching the semifinal of the West Riding County Cup and the final of the Northern Premier League Challenge Cup, but was unexpectedly released in March 2002 by manager Trevor Storton who cited his attitude. He promptly signed for Radcliffe Borough, scored 15 minutes into his debut, and was named man of the match as Borough beat Guiseley 4–1.
