= Robert Jackson (coroner) =

Robert Jackson (died 1439) was a coroner, esquire, bailiff and landowner who operated in the County Palatine of Durham in the Late Middle Ages, overseeing the district of Easington as well as Sunderland. He resided in the manor of Farringdon Hall, which is now the suburb of Farringdon, Sunderland.

== Life ==
Known as "Robert Jackson of Sunderland", he was appointed by the Bishop of Durham as the Coroner of the Easington area in 1402 collecting taxes on behalf of the Bishop of Durham a lifelong position he would hold for nearly 40 years, as well as acting as a "Keeper of the Peace" in regional disputes between various landowners.
