= Richie Taylor =

English footballer

Personal information
- Full name: Richard William Taylor
- Date of birth: 20 June 1951 (age 75)
- Place of birth: Silksworth, County Durham, England
- Height: 5 ft 8 in (1.73 m)
- Position: Winger

Youth career
- –1968: Sunderland

Senior career*
Years	Team	Apps	(Gls)
1968–1972	Sunderland	1	(0)
1972–1973	York City	28	(2)
Total		29	(2)
- * Club domestic league appearances and goals

Richard William Taylor (born 20 June 1951) is an English former professional footballer who played as a winger in the Football League for Sunderland and York City.
