= Keith Trotter =

English cricketer

Personal information
- Full name: Keith Trotter
- Born: 18 January 1962 (age 64); Silksworth, County Durham, England
- Batting: Right-handed
- Bowling: Right-arm fast-medium

Domestic team information
- Years: Team
- 1988–1989: Durham

Career statistics
Competition	List A
Matches	1
Runs scored	4
Batting average	4.00
100s/50s	–/–
Top score	4
Balls bowled	72
Wickets	2
Bowling average	30.00
5 wickets in innings	–
10 wickets in match	–
Best bowling	2/60
Catches/stumpings	1/–
- Source: Cricinfo, 8 August 2011

Keith Trotter (born 18 January 1962) is a former English cricketer. Trotter was a right-handed batsman who bowled right-arm fast-medium. He was born in Silksworth, County Durham.

Trotter made his debut for Durham against Cumberland in 1988 Minor Counties Championship. He played Minor counties cricket for Durham in 1988 and 1989, making 3 Minor Counties Championship appearances. He made his only List A appearance against Middlesex in the 1989 NatWest Trophy. In this match, he took the wickets of Mike Gatting and Mark Ramprakash for the cost of 60 runs from 12 overs, while with the bat he was dismissed for 4 runs by Ricardo Ellcock.
