= Barnes Park =

Park in Sunderland, England

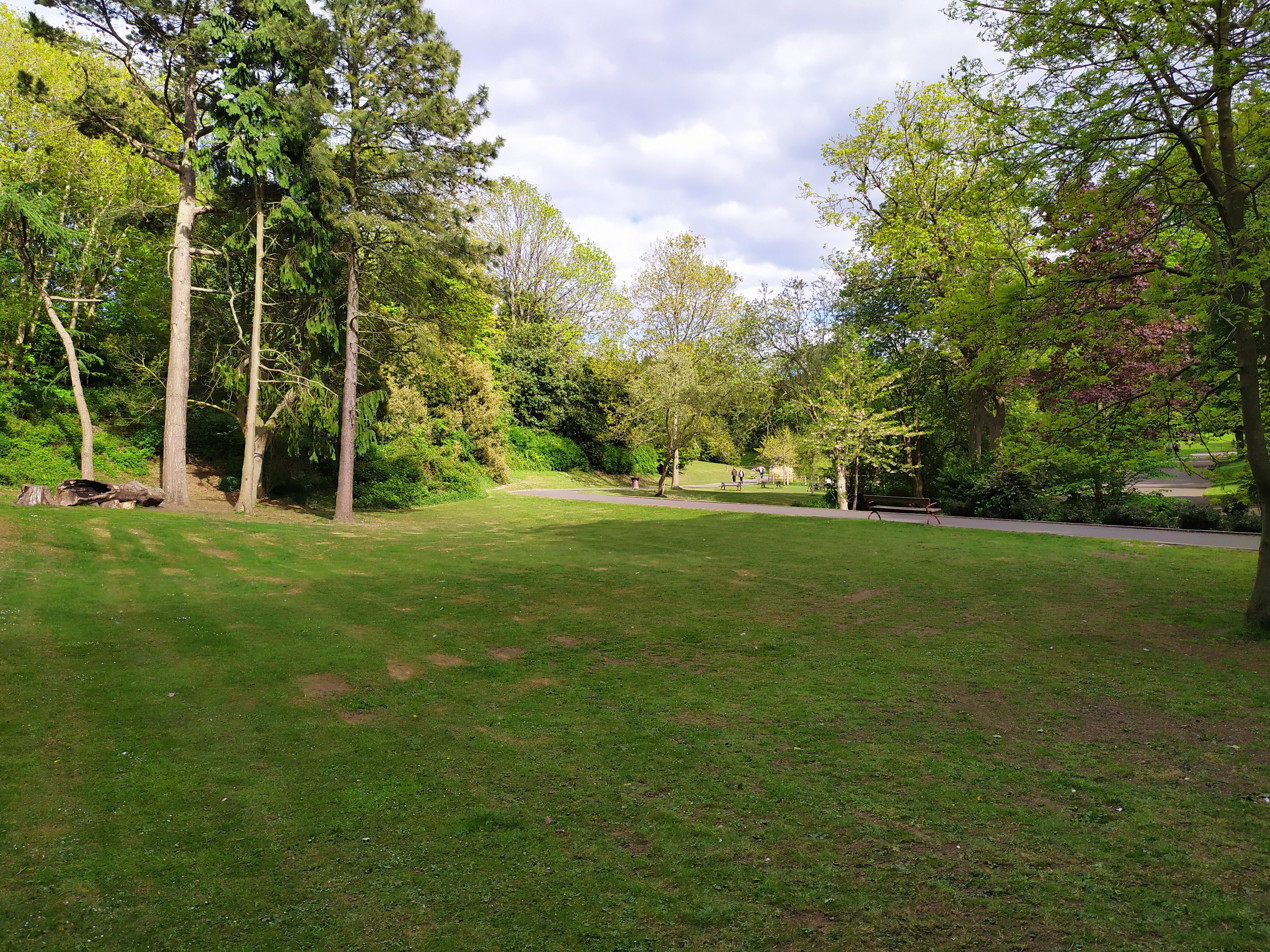
- Barnes Park in 2020

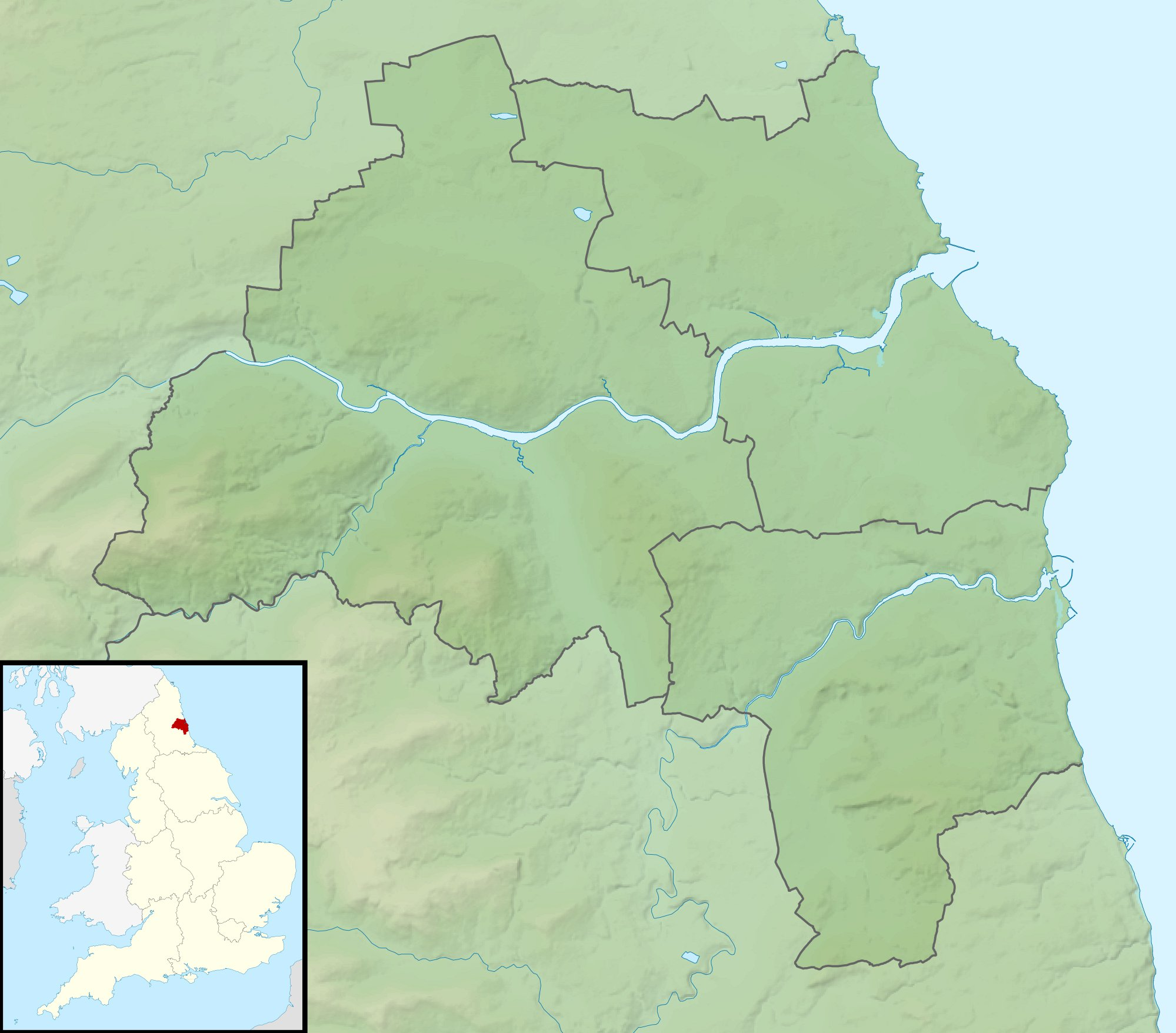
- Location within Tyne and Wear
- Interactive map of Barnes Park
- Type: Country park
- Location: Sunderland, United Kingdom
- Coordinates: 54°53′37″N 1°24′51″W
- Open: August 1909; 116 years ago

Barnes Park is a public park in Sunderland, Tyne and Wear, England. Taken together with its post-war extensions, which run to the former county borough boundary, it is the largest park in the city.

== History ==
Barnes Park was laid out in the late nineteenth and early twentieth centuries. The land for Barnes Park, set in a valley through which the Bishopwearmouth Burn flows, was bought in 1904 for the sum £8,500.

Three years later, when the depression of trade struck in 1907, the laying out of the park was started – this became a source of employment for a number of practical gardeners from the area, with a total of 2,798 men being employed. The park was then opened in August 1909. Many of the established trees were retained with oak, ash, beech and elm trees constituting its main wooded growth. Paths meandered throughout the park in all directions and at the west side, on the most elevated piece of ground, two bowling greens, tennis courts, and a cafe were established.

The park has since been home to a wide range of wildlife and with nesting boxes being provided, breeding birds have regularly returned to the park over the years. Water hens, starlings, linnets, snipes, tits, diving ducks, and chaffinches can be frequently observed.

=== Restoration ===
After a two-year bidding process, the Sunderland City Council secured over £3 million in Heritage Lottery funding to restore the historic features of Barnes Park and to redevelop its amenities for future generations. Brambledown have been appointed the main contractors in the restoration.

== See also ==
- Mowbray Park
