= Quebec Bantam Football League =

The Quebec Bantam Football League (QBFL) is composed of amateur Canadian football varsity teams playing in the Greater Montreal Region. The players are aged between 14 and 15 years old. Teams compete in late-summer and fall in an 8-game regular season leading up to a playoff tournament.

== Teams (2010 season) ==
Bill Allan Division

1. North Shore Lions
2. St. Lazare Stallions
3. St. Laurent Spartans
4. Laurentian Wildcats
5. Lasalle Warriors
6. Sun Youth Hornets

Earl De La Perralle Division

1. Ile-Perrot Western Patriots
2. Lakeshore Cougars
3. Joliette Pirates
4. Chateaugay Raiders
5. North Shore Cheetahs
6. St. Leonard Cougars

Bob Mironowicz Division

1. Sherbrooke Bulldogs
2. Laurentien Jaguars
3. Laurentien Lions
4. Laurentien Pantheres
5. Laurentien Lynx
6. Laurentien Pumas
