= Walbottle Academy =

Location
- Hexham Road; Newcastle Upon Tyne, Tyne and Wear, NE15 9TP; England; 54°59′48″N 1°44′27″W

Information
- Type: Academy
- Motto: Outcomes focused, Child centred
- Trust: Northern Education Trust
- Department for Education URN: 148135 Tables
- Ofsted: Reports
- Executive Principal: Martin Wood
- Principal: Richard Harrison
- Gender: Mixed-sex
- Enrolment: 1619
- Capacity: 1900

Walbottle Academy, previously Walbottle Campus and Walbottle Campus Technology College, is a large secondary Academy in Newcastle upon Tyne, England. It is one of the largest secondary academies in Newcastle.

== History ==
The school first opened in 1959 as three schools on one site, a Grammar School and two Secondary Moderns. These later merged to become the single Walbottle Campus Technology College. The majority of the school's students come from feeder Primary Schools which are members of the Outer West Learning Trust, of which Walbottle Campus is an Associate Member. In 2008, Walbottle Campus received a new building as part of the government's Building Schools for the Future (BSF) private finance initiative scheme. Previously named Walbottle Campus Technology College, the government removed funding for the 'technology college' status and therefore the school was renamed Walbottle Campus.

== Academisation ==
Following Walbottle Academy’s predecessor school's Ofsted inspection in February 2019 and the Inadequate judgement, Walbottle Campus began plans to convert to Academy Status. In July 2019, Walbottle Campus received its academy order from former Secretary of State for Education Damian Hinds and talks began between Multi Academy Trusts and the board of governors.

Northern Education Trust, a successful academy trust based in Ryton, Gateshead, showed excessive interest in working with Newcastle City Council to help transform Walbottle Campus with regards to behaviour, student grades and attainment and school management. Northern Education Trust made an arrangement with Newcastle City Council to manage the school and improve it before set decisions were made regarding the school's future.

It was confirmed in January 2020, that due to a successful trial, Northern Education Trust would become the official sponsor for Walbottle Campus, aiming to officially takeover the school in September 2020.

Walbottle Campus became an official member of the Northern Education Trust on 1 September 2020, and therefore was renamed 'Walbottle Academy'.

== Building ==
Walbottle Academy's new building opened in 2008 after being rebuilt as part of the governments Phase 1 PFI Newcastle Building Schools for the Future Programme. It opened alongside six other schools which were also rebuilt in the Phase 1 part of the programme. Four other schools later opened in 2011 as part of Phase 2 of the programme.

- A Wing - Health and Social Care, Child Development and Care, Business studies, Sixth Form & SEN Department.
- B Wing - Humanities and MFL
- C Wing - English
- D Wing - Mathematics and Art
- E Wing - Technology
- F Wing - Science
- H Wing - Physical Education, Performing Arts, Music, Head of School and Main Administration
- K Main Street - Entrance to all wing, I.C.T Classrooms, Cafe and Library

== School performance and inspections ==
In the Ofsted Inspection of 2016, Walbottle Campus was graded 'good' after previously receiving 'requires improvement' on previous inspections.

Walbottle Campus had a 'no notice' inspection in February 2019. The result of the inspection was that Walbottle was judged Inadequate for all aspects of the inspection and lost their ‘Good’ Judgement.

As of 2023, the school's most recent inspection was in January 2023, with an outcome of Good.

== Alumni ==
- Sue Rolph, gold medal swimmer in the 1994 Commonwealth Games 4x100m freestyle
