= Bishopwearmouth Burn =

Stream in Sunderland, England

Coordinates: 54.8946°N 1.4076°W

Bishopwearmouth Burn or the Barnes Burn is a stream flowing through the city of Sunderland. A tributary of the River Wear, the stream originates between Thorney Close and Hastings Hill farm. It proceeds to run through Barnes Park and its extensions before going underground due to modern housing and again unculverts briefly at Burn Park, and meeting the river at what was Bishopwearmouth, where it was also referred to as the "Rector's Gill".

== See also ==
- Hendon Burn
