= Northern Education Trust =

British multi-academy trust

- Founded: March 15, 2010
- Type: Multi-academy trust
- Registration no.: 07189647
- Purpose: Education
- Location: Thorp Academy, Main Road, Ryton, NE40 3AH
- Coordinates: 53.70895°N 1.51292°W
- Key people: Jane Wilson, CEO
- Website: northerneducationtrust.org

Northern Education Trust is a multi-academy trust operating in the North of England, established in 2010. It operates both primary and secondary academies. The Northern Education Trust (NET) is a founder and member of the Northern Alliance of Trusts.

== Academies ==
As of January 2025, there were a total of 30 academies run by the Northern Education Trust.

=== Secondary academies ===
- Buile Hill Academy
- The Blyth Academy
- Denton Community College
- Dyke House Academy
- Essa Academy
- Farringdon Community Academy
- Freebrough Academy
- The Grangefield Academy
- Hetton Academy
- Kearsley Academy
- Kirk Balk Academy
- Manor Community Academy
- North Shore Academy
- Red House Academy
- Thornaby Academy
- Thorp Academy
- Walbottle Academy

=== Primary academies ===
- Abbey Park Academy
- Badger Hill Academy
- Chesham Primary Academy
- Essa Primary Academy
- The Ferns Primary Academy
- Frederick Nattrass Primary Academy
- Hazlehurst Primary Academy
- Hilton Primary Academy
- Merlin Top Primary Academy
- Mount Pellon Primary Academy
- Norton Primary Academy
- The Oak Tree Academy
- Whitecliffe Academy

== Northern Alliance of Trusts membership ==
In 2017 it was instrumental in setting up the Northern Alliance of Trusts. In 2019, the academies minister, Lord Agnew, announced a new growth fund to support smaller academy trusts to merge to create bigger trusts and share resources, in response criticisms of the efficiency academies. Northern Alliance of Trusts received a grant from the Department for Education Strategic School Improvement Fund. This was funding aimed at in-need schools to improve school performance and pupil attainment, and favoured schemes in which schools helped each other. Funding opened in 2017 and gave grants for two years.

The Northern Alliance is the first formal partnership of its kind between larger chains. Members share resources but continue to act as independent legal entities. The Alliance works on common procurement, leadership standards, fund raising, and strategies for the recruitment and retention of teachers. It has eight members:

- Northern Education Trust
- Astrea Academy Trust
- Delta Academies Trust
- Dixons Academies Trust
- Horizons Specialist Academy Trust
- North East Learning Trust
- Outwood Grange Academies Trust
- WISE Academies
