= Jordan Cook =

English footballer (born 1990)

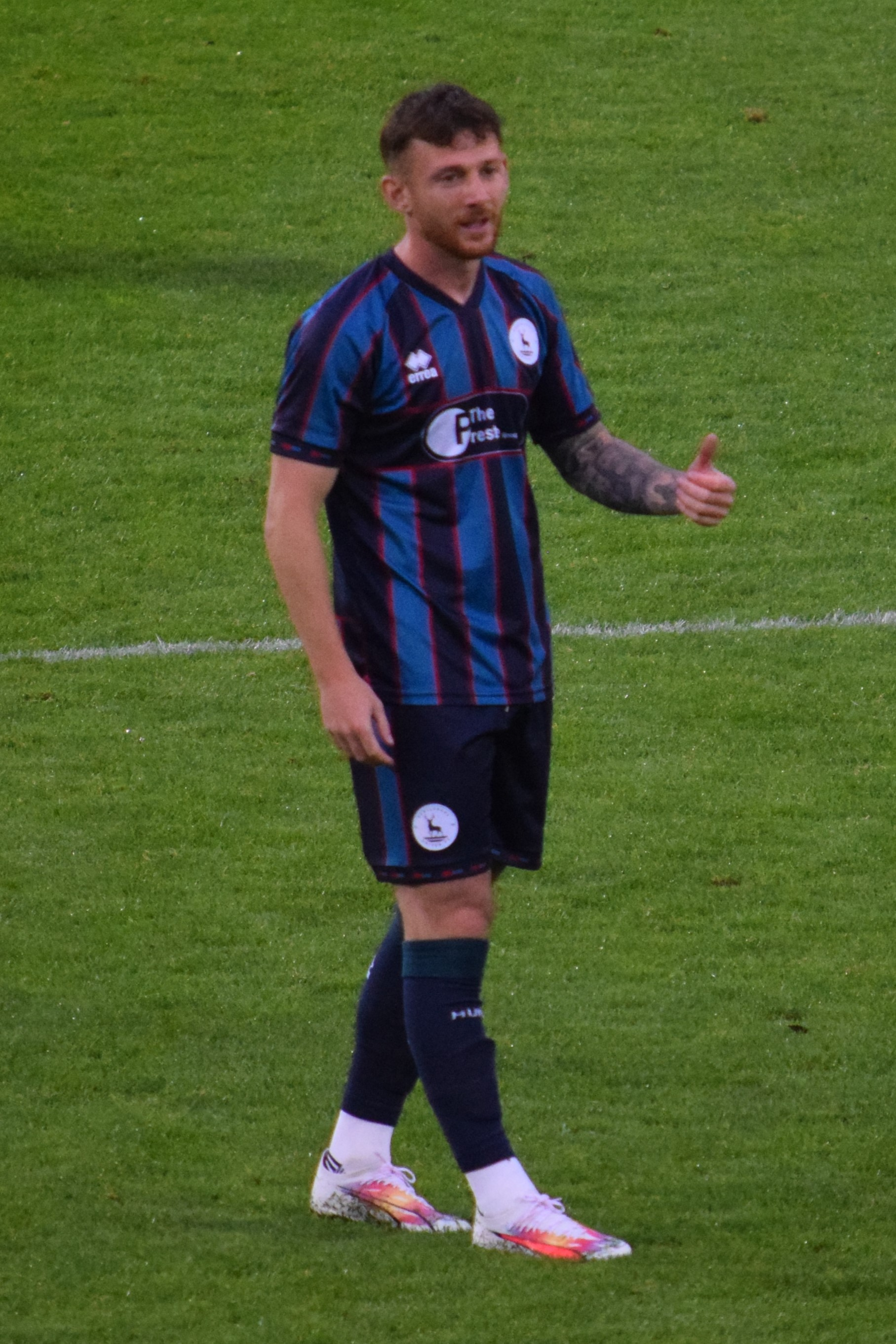
- Cook playing for Hartlepool United in 2023

Personal information
- Full name: Jordan Alan Cook
- Date of birth: 20 March 1990 (age 36)
- Place of birth: Hetton-le-Hole, England
- Height: 5 ft 9 in (1.74 m)
- Positions: Midfielder; striker

Youth career
- 1997–2008: Sunderland

Senior career*
Years	Team	Apps	(Gls)
2008–2012	Sunderland	3	(0)
2009	→ Darlington (loan)	5	(0)
2011	→ Walsall (loan)	8	(1)
2012	→ Carlisle United (loan)	14	(4)
2012–2014	Charlton Athletic	10	(0)
2013	→ Yeovil Town (loan)	1	(0)
2014–2016	Walsall	66	(8)
2016–2018	Luton Town	45	(3)
2018–2020	Grimsby Town	38	(6)
2020–2021	Gateshead	10	(1)
2021–2022	Hartlepool United	4	(0)
2024	Blyth Spartans	13	(2)
2024	Shildon	2	(0)
Total		219	(25)
- * Club domestic league appearances and goals

Jordan Alan Cook (born 20 March 1990) is an English former professional footballer who played as a midfielder or a striker.

He began his career with Sunderland and played three times in the Premier League during the 2010–11 season, also spending time on loan with Darlington, Walsall and Carlisle United. In 2012 he signed for Charlton Athletic and has since gone on to feature in the EFL for Yeovil Town, Luton Town, Grimsby Town and Hartlepool United, as well as stint with non-league club Gateshead. After leaving Hartlepool, Cook went on to play semi-professionally for Blyth Spartans and Shildon.

== Career ==
=== Sunderland ===
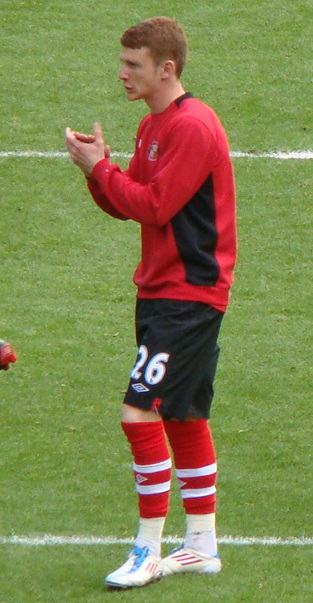
Cook training with Sunderland in 2011

Cook was born in Hetton-le-Hole, Tyne and Wear and attended Hetton School. He began his career with Hetton Juniors, before joining Sunderland aged seven. Cook progressed through the club's youth system and signed his first professional contract on 30 May 2008. He joined League Two club Darlington on loan on 18 August 2009, before making his debut later that day in a 1–0 defeat at home to Crewe Alexandra, in which he was substituted for Jeff Smith in the 58th minute. His loan spell with Darlington was cut short after sustaining cruciate knee ligament damage. Cook made his Sunderland debut on 26 December 2010 after being introduced as an 82nd-minute substitute for Steed Malbranque in a 2–0 defeat away to Manchester United. He replaced Nedum Onuoha as an 87th-minute substitute to make his home debut in a 4–2 defeat to Chelsea on 1 February 2011.

On 24 March 2011, Cook signed for League One club Walsall on loan until the end of 2010–11. He debuted a day later in a 1–1 draw away to Milton Keynes Dons, having entered the match as a 68th-minute substitute. His first goal for Walsall came in a 3–2 win at home to Brentford on 12 April, and completed the loan spell with eight appearances. After returning to Sunderland, he played in their final match of 2010–11, a 3–0 win away to West Ham United, having entered the match as a 72nd-minute substitute for Asamoah Gyan.

Cook joined Carlisle United on 16 January 2012 on a one-month loan. After making four appearances during his initial loan spell, Cook's loan was extended by a further month until 10 March. He scored his first goal for Carlisle after being introduced as a 74th-minute substitute in a 4–1 win at home to Bury, after which his loan was due to expire. However, the loan was extended on 22 March by a further month, and would expire after the penultimate match of the season against Exeter City under emergency loan rules. Cook scored a brace five days later to help Carlisle come from behind to earn a 2–1 win away to Milton Keynes Dons. He completed the emergency loan with 14 appearances and four goals. After failing to make an appearance for Sunderland in 2011–12, Cook was amongst nine players released by the club in May 2012.

=== Charlton Athletic ===
Cook signed a two-year contract with newly promoted Championship club Charlton Athletic on 9 July 2012. He debuted in a 1–1 draw against Leyton Orient in a League Cup first round tie on 14 August, before making his league debut in a 1–1 draw away to Birmingham City four days later, having entered the match as a 77th-minute substitute for Bradley Wright-Phillips. Cook made six further league appearances and one FA Cup appearance for Charlton in 2012–13. He joined League One club Yeovil Town on a one-month loan on 18 March 2013. Cook debuted as a 61st-minute substitute for Gavin Williams in a 2–0 defeat at home to Swindon Town. However, a knee injury meant he returned to Charlton for treatment and made no further appearances for Yeovil. Cook made his first appearance of 2013–14 after being named in the starting lineup against Oxford United in the League Cup first round, which finished as a 4–0 victory. However, his first-team opportunities were limited, and finished the season with only five appearances. On 22 May 2014, it was announced that Cook would be released following the expiration of his contract.

=== Walsall ===
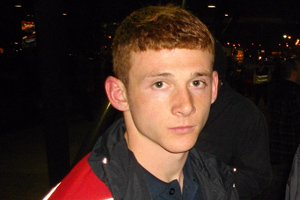
Cook with Walsall in 2011

On 7 July 2014, Cook returned to League One club Walsall and signed a two-year contract, having previously been on loan with them for two months in 2011. He made his first appearance since his return in a 1–1 draw with Bristol City on 4 October after being introduced as a 34th-minute substitute for the injured Tom Bradshaw. One week later, he scored the opening goal, his first since April 2012 in a 2–1 defeat away to Oldham Athletic. Cook scored a brace to help Walsall come from behind to earn a 3–1 win at home to Barnsley on 13 December. He scored his fourth goal of the season on 7 February 2015 in a 2–0 win away to Doncaster Rovers after only three minutes. Cook came off the bench as a 72nd-minute substitute for Tom Bradshaw to score his fifth goal of the season in stoppage time against Crawley Town in a 5–0 victory on 14 April. Cook also played in every Football League Trophy match, which saw Walsall reach the final of the competition, only to be defeated 2–0 by Bristol City at Wembley Stadium on 22 March. He finished 2014–15 with 39 appearances and five goals.

Cook was named in the starting lineup against Oldham Athletic on the opening day of 2015–16, but was replaced in the 66th minute by Milan Lalkovič in a 1–1 draw. Thereafter, he assumed the role of a substitute, making 36 of his 44 appearances from the bench. However, he scored three times including Walsall's third goal in the 93rd minute of a 3–1 win away to Shrewsbury Town, prior to a brace in a 2–0 win at home to Port Vale after being introduced as a 60th-minute substitute for Kieron Morris. His contributions helped Walsall to qualify for the play-offs after a third-place finish in League One. Cook played in both semi-final legs as a substitute, scoring a late consolation goal in the second leg as Walsall lost 3–1 to Barnsley and 6–1 on aggregate.

=== Luton Town ===
On 5 July 2016, Cook signed a two-year contract with League Two club Luton Town after rejecting a new contract with Walsall. He debuted on the opening day of 2016–17 in a 3–0 win away to Plymouth Argyle. Cook scored his first goal for Luton in a 4–1 win at home to Wycombe Wanderers on 3 September. He was released by Luton at the end of the 2017–18 season after the club won promotion to League One.

=== Grimsby Town ===
Cook signed for League Two club Grimsby Town on a two-year contract on 22 June 2018. Cook was released at the end of the 2019–20 season. He made 49 appearances in all competitions for The Mariners, scoring eight times.

=== Gateshead ===
Cook joined Gateshead of the National League North on 20 October 2020 for the 2020–21 season. Injuries limited Cook to 10 appearances for Gateshead.

=== Hartlepool United ===
In September 2021, Cook moved up two divisions when he signed for League Two side Hartlepool United. In October 2021, Cook picked up a groin injury which saw him out for over six weeks. Cook made his return to the starting eleven on 1 January 2022 in 0–0 draw against Oldham Athletic, in which he had a goal ruled out for offside. However, he picked up an injury in the game which saw him ruled out for the rest of the 2021–22 season. At the end of 2021–22 season, Cook was offered a new contract with the club. He joined the club for pre-season training in July but did not sign the contract. On 23 July 2022, Cook tweeted that his surgery had been completed and was aiming to play football again before Christmas time.

At the start of the 2023–24 season, Cook began training with Hartlepool during pre-season and appeared as a trialist in their friendly against Blyth Spartans. It was the first time he had played in over 18 months.

=== Blyth Spartans ===
Cook made his return to football when he signed for National League North side Blyth Spartans in January 2024. Upon signing, Blyth boss Jon Shaw said "He's a talented footballer who has played at a very good standard and he's ready to go after a tough year, I'm delighted that he's here." On 13 January 2024, Jordan made his first competitive appearance in 742 days in a 2–2 draw against Banbury United.

=== Shildon ===
After turning down a new contract with Blyth, Cook signed for Shildon on a one-year deal. Cook left football in 2024 to take up a career in renewable energy.

== Career statistics ==
Appearances and goals by club, season and competition
Club	Season	League			FA Cup		League Cup		Other		Total	
Club	Season	Division	Apps	Goals	Apps	Goals	Apps	Goals	Apps	Goals	Apps	Goals
Sunderland	2008–09	Premier League	0	0	0	0	0	0	—		0	0
Sunderland	2009–10	Premier League	0	0	0	0	0	0	—		0	0
Sunderland	2010–11	Premier League	3	0	0	0	0	0	—		3	0
Sunderland	2011–12	Premier League	0	0	0	0	0	0	—		0	0
Sunderland	Total		3	0	0	0	0	0	—		3	0
Darlington (loan)	2009–10	League Two	5	0	—		—		—		5	0
Walsall (loan)	2010–11	League One	8	1	—		—		—		8	1
Carlisle United (loan)	2011–12	League One	14	4	—		—		—		14	4
Charlton Athletic	2012–13	Championship	7	0	1	0	1	0	—		9	0
Charlton Athletic	2013–14	Championship	3	0	1	0	1	0	—		5	0
Charlton Athletic	Total		10	0	2	0	2	0	—		14	0
Yeovil Town (loan)	2012–13	League One	1	0	—		—		—		1	0
Walsall	2014–15	League One	32	5	1	0	0	0	6 (Note: Appearances in Football League Trophy)	0	39	5
Walsall	2015–16	League One	34	3	4	0	3	0	3 (Note: One appearance in Football League Trophy, two appearances and one goal in League One play-offs)	1	44	4
Walsall	Total		66	8	5	0	3	0	9	1	83	9
Luton Town	2016–17	League Two	35	3	2	0	1	0	4 (Note: Three appearances and one goal in EFL Trophy, one appearance in League Two play-offs)	1	42	4
Luton Town	2017–18	League Two	10	0	1	0	1	0	4 (Note: Appearances in EFL Trophy)	1	16	1
Luton Town	Total		45	3	3	0	2	0	8	2	58	5
Grimsby Town	2018–19	League Two	24	4	2	0	1	0	2	1	29	5
Grimsby Town	2019–20	League Two	14	2	2	0	2	1	2	0	20	3
Grimsby Town	Total		38	6	4	0	3	1	4	1	49	8
Gateshead	2020–21	National League North	10	1	—		—		0	0	10	1
Hartlepool United	2021–22	League Two	4	0	0	0	0	0	1	0	5	0
Blyth Spartans	2023–24	National League North	13	2	—		—		0	0	13	2
Shildon	2024–25	Northern League Division One	2	0	—		—		1	1	3	1
Career total			219	25	14	0	10	1	23	5	266	31

== Honours ==
Walsall

- Football League Trophy runner-up: 2014–15

Luton Town

- EFL League Two runner-up: 2017–18
