= Pennywell =

Housing estate in Sunderland, England

Coordinates: 54.897068°N 1.442749°W

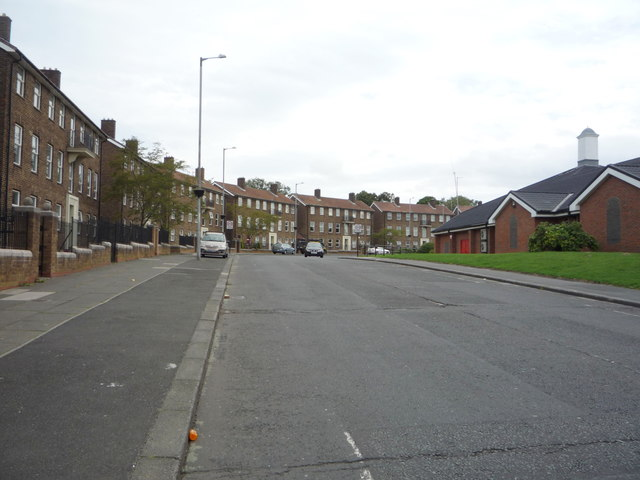
- Portsmouth Road

- Location within Tyne and Wear
- Metropolitan borough: City of Sunderland
- Metropolitan county: Tyne and Wear
- Region: North East
- Country: England
- Sovereign state: United Kingdom
- Post town: SUNDERLAND
- Postcode district: SR4
- Dialling code: 0191
- Police: Northumbria
- Fire: Tyne and Wear
- Ambulance: North East
- UK Parliament: Washington and Gateshead South

Pennywell is one of the UK's largest post-war social housing schemes, and is situated in the central-west area of Sunderland, Tyne and Wear, North East England. Pennywell is the largest local authority housing estate in the City of Sunderland. The estate mostly built during the late 1940s and early 1950s to replace 19th century slums in the centre of Sunderland. The name Pennywell is of Celtic origin and is thought to mean "wellspring at the top of the hill".

Pre-generation, during the mid noughties, the Pennywell estate consisted of nearly 3,000 homes, around 11% of which are privately owned and has a total population of 10,709 This figure was considerably lower than in previous decades, when the Pennywell area housed over 20,000 people.

== Crime ==
Pennywell has traditionally been associated with high crime rates since the estate was completed in 1953. Knife crime and anti-social behaviour have been a growing problem since the 1990s,however decreasing in recent years.

In the late 1980's, as high as 2.7% of Pennywell's population had taken a motor vehicle without owner's consent, known colloquially as "joyriding" or "twocking". This was against a national everage of 0.08%.

In 1994, an incident made national news when ten gang members were sentenced to jail. They threw a brick through the windscreen of a police patrol car travelling 70mph in a pursuit of a stolen vehicle through the 'lawless' estate. This was attributed to renowned activity in the area, labelled by local youths as "brick a squaddie". One of the police officers, John Robinson was left brain damaged and the other couldn't return to work because of the psychological trauma. Both officers successfully sued Northumbria Police, due their failure to 'provide toughened patrol vehicle windscreens'.

As a result of this and other reported crime in the area, as well as highlighting an unemployment rate as 19% (around twice the national average), The Independent newspaper condemned Pennywell as a "no go area" and one of the worst places in Britain.

There were three murder cases within a five-year period in the 2000's.

In 2002, there was a conviction when somebody fatally stabbed their brother-in-law at a house party. In 2005, a man was convicted for murder when he broke into a house and 'virtually decapitated' his victim with an axe.

Then the estate was the scene of a heavily publicised murder case when 22-year-old Kevin Johnson was fatally stabbed outside his house on Partick Road in the early hours of 19 May 2007. Three teenagers were convicted of the murder six months later and sentenced to life imprisonment. At the trial, it was revealed that after stabbing Kevin Johnson, the three defendants had gone on to attack another man in the area and also damaged two cars. Mr Johnson's family later had two applications for criminal injuries compensation rejected on the basis that he had contributed to his own death by leaving the safety of his home to confront the teenagers about their noisy behaviour. A third application for compensation was successful and the Johnson family received £5,500 from a scheme which could already pay a maximum of £500,000 to claimants.

In 2018, the sister of one of the convicted murderers tried to overturn his conviction. This followed a conclusion in 2016, by the Supreme Court that found that 'the laws on joint enterprise had been interpreted incorrectly for 30 years'. The offender in question was 16 years old at the time of the incident and was not deemed to be the aggressor. The conviction was upheld in 2019.

In December 2025, the police targeted Pennywell in a 'dedicated day of action' after 'public concerns over antisocial behaviour, motorbike-related crime and the sale of illegal products in and around the city'. Nine arrests were made in relation to Class A and Class B drug dealing, illegal working, illegal produce, as well as multiple driving offences.

== Regeneration ==
By the mid-to-late 90's, a massive programme of renewal and regeneration for the area was created. In 2001, Sunderland City Council sold 36,000 social properties (virtually all its owned houses in the city) to Sunderland Housing Group (rebranded as Gentoo in 2007). It was called the 'biggest transfer of properties Britain had ever seen'. This was an attempt to improve the standard of living in some of the city's most anti-social and deprived areas. Pennywell was viewed as the symbol of this with residents being displaced across the city. Gentoo demolished 583 social properties in the area with an initial 6 phase plan to replace them with 593 private homes.

There was criticism of how long the project took with a large area of land (the 'old Pennywell estate') being left empty for over a decade. The poor optics of this was relevant with the site being situated as the 'gateway' between the A19 and the city. Though the original plan was for cheaper or rental houses to be built, a council report suggested this aspect of the Pennywell development couldn't 'be developed viably due to the high abnormal costs". The first development of this specific area was finally confirmed in 2019 and was completed in 2024.

Alongside the construction of new houses, Gentoo also refurbished over 1,000 of the estate's remaining houses at a cost of £19 million.

In 2025, it was reported that Gentoo had 'officially started work on its largest affordable housing scheme to date' in the estate.

== Education ==
Pennywell Comprehensive School was built in 1967 and remained open until 2008. It was finally demolished in 2009 and replaced with a new facility on the same site. However, the school is now called Academy 360. Pupils attending the comprehensive school were members of one of four houses - Stratford (green), Harwell (blue), Everest (yellow) and Runnymede (red). The school boasted excellent sporting facilities including several full size football/rugby pitches, an all-weather athletics track, a fully equipped sports hall (incorporating five-a-side pitches, basketball/netball courts & cricket nets), fully equipped indoor gymnasium with balance beams/climbing ropes/trampoline harnesses, outdoor cricket pitches, tennis courts and several tarmac yard areas with basketball courts. Classrooms were predominantly located in four five-storey tower blocks (B, C, D & E blocks) and included science laboratories, art studios, home economics kitchens and IT suites. The new school (Academy 360) has four houses, Amity, Loftus, Torrens and Adelaide. These houses were named after ships that had been built within Sunderland. Christ's College, another school in Pennywell, also has extensions being built.
