= Shoreline Park =

Shoreline Park can refer to:

- Shoreline Park, Mississippi, USA; unincorporated community
- Shoreline Park, Santa Barbara, California, USA; a park
- Shoreline Park, Mountain View, California, USA; a park

== See also ==
- Middle Harbor Shoreline Park, Oakland, California, USA; a park
- Shoreline (disambiguation)
