= Horizons Specialist Academy Trust =

UK multi academy trust

- Founded: July 12, 2013
- Type: Multi-academy trust
- Registration no.: 08608287
- Purpose: Education
- Location: Abbey Hill Academy, Ketton Road, Stockton-On-Tees, TS19 8BU
- Key people: Elizaeth Anne Horne
- Website: www.horizonstrust.org.uk

Horizons Specialist Academy Trust is a multi-academy trust (MAT) that operates five special schools with academy status across northern England. It is an exempt charity, regulated by the Department for Education.

== Philosophy ==
The trust champions the right of students with special educational needs. It is committed to helping to develop into:

- confident individuals who are positive about who they are and what they can do,
- successful enthusiastic and motivated learners,
- positive participants in the local and wider communities.

== History ==
The trust was founded in 2013, growing out of the Abbey Hill single academy trust. It was joined by the other academies the following years.

It was a founder member of the Northern Alliance of Trusts.

== Academies ==
- Abbey Hill Academy
- Green Gates Academy
- Westlands Academy
- Hollis Academy
- Mo Mowlam Academy
- Fairfax Provision
