= Lower North Shore (disambiguation) =

Lower North Shore is a collection of suburbs of Sydney, Australia.

Lower North Shore may also refer to:

- Lower North Shore, English name for Basse-Côte-Nord, a prior territory in the Côte-Nord region of Quebec, Canada
- Lower North Shore, English name for Eastern Côte-Nord, Quebec, Canada

== See also ==
- North Shore (disambiguation)
