= Shoreline (disambiguation) =

Shoreline is the shore.

Shoreline or Shore Line, or variant, may refer to:

== Places ==
- Shoreline, Washington, USA; a city
- Shoreline Amphitheatre, Mountain View, California, USA; an outdoor amphitheater
- Shoreline School District, Washington (state), USA

== Transport ==
- Shore Line Railway (disambiguation)
- Shoreline North/185th station, a light rail station in Shoreline, Washington, USA
- Shoreline South/148th station, a light rail station in Shoreline, Washington, USA
- Shore Line Trolley Museum, East Haven, Connecticut, USA

== Other uses ==
- Shoreline Community College, Shoreline, Washington (state), USA
- Shoreline Entertainment, a California, USA film production company
- "7/4 (Shoreline)", a song by Broken Social Scene from the 2005 album Broken Social Scene

== See also ==
- Shoreline Park (disambiguation)
- South Shore Line (disambiguation)
- North Shore Line (disambiguation)
- Shore (disambiguation)
- Line (disambiguation)
