= North Shore Road =

North Shore Road may mean:

- Nevada State Route 28, along the north shore of Lake Tahoe
- Nevada State Route 167, along the north shore of Lake Mead
- Nevada State Route 169, along the north shore of Lake Mead
- an unfinished road along the north shore of Fontana Lake, within Great Smoky Mountains National Park in North Carolina

== See also ==
- North Shore (disambiguation)
