= Thomas Coke Squance =

Thomas Coke Squance FRCS FRSE FSA Scot (1852–1923) was a 19th- and 20th-century British pathologist, antiquarian and naturalist.

== Life ==
Squance was born at Bishopwearmouth, then in County Durham in 1852. He was the eldest son of Thomas Coke Squance, a bank manager from Frome and his wife, Elizabeth Salisbury Harrison. His father founded T. C. Squance & Sons in Durham in 1870.

He was educated locally, then studied medicine at Durham University. He underwent practical training at St. Thomas's Hospital, London and gained his doctorate (MD) in 1877. He spent his career in Sunderland. He was Consulting Physician to Sunderland Royal Infirmary, Medical Officer of Health to Sunderland Rural District Council and Surgeon to Sunderland Women's and Children's Hospital.

He was elected a Fellow of the Royal Society of Edinburgh in 1906. His proposers for the latter were Sir Thomas Oliver, Robert Hoden, Sir Byrom Bramwell, and Nicholas Henry Martin.

From 1910 to 1914 he was President of the Sunderland Antiquarian Society.

He died on 29 May 1923.

== Family ==
In 1880 he married Eleanor Vint, daughter of James Vint.

== Publications ==
- Selections of Thomas Coke Squance (1899).
