= North Shore Cheetahs =

Football club

The North Shore Cheetahs are a football club and a member of the Quebec Bantam Football League (QBFL). They were founded in 2006 after a proposal was accepted at the QBFL's AGM (Annual General Meeting). The proposed system has both the Cheetahs and the North Shore Lions holding a joint winter evaluation camp. Throughout the camp, the Lions take the more "polished" players and the Cheetahs (competing in a lower division) take the rest. They are a developmental team and the next year, the players are able to try out for the Lions once again.
