= Thornaby Academy =

Coordinates: 54.5424°N 1.2898°W

Location
- Baysdale Road; Thornaby-on-Tees; North Yorkshire, TS17 9DB; England

Information
- Type: Academy
- Local authority: Stockton-on-Tees
- Trust: Northern Education Trust
- Department for Education URN: 148186 Tables
- Ofsted: Reports
- Principal: K Brownless
- Gender: Coeducational
- Age: 11 to 16
- Website: https://tca.northerneducationtrust.org/

Thornaby Academy (formerly Thornaby Community School) is a coeducational secondary school located in Thornaby-on-Tees in the Borough of Stockton-on-Tees, North Yorkshire, England.

== Background ==
Thornaby Academy was built on the site of a school which had been previously demolished known as Bassleton School. When Thornaby Academy was first built it was known as Thornaby Community School (TCS). Thornaby Community School converted to academy status in September 2010 and was renamed Thornaby Academy. The school is sponsored by Northern Education Trust as of January 2024.

Thornaby Academy offers GCSEs and BTECs as programmes of study for pupils. The school also has a specialism in business and enterprise with a particular focus on digital media.
