= South Shore Line (disambiguation) =

South Shore Line can refer to:

- the South Shore Line, a commuter rail line from Chicago, Illinois, to South Bend, Indiana, US.
- Chicago South Shore and South Bend Railroad, commonly referred to as South Shore Line, a freight rail company operating on the commuter rail line in Illinois and Indiana
- South Shore Line, the original name of the Braintree Branch of the MBTA Red Line in Massachusetts, US
- South Shore Railroad, a railroad in Massachusetts
- Duluth, South Shore and Atlantic Railway, a railroad in Wisconsin and Michigan, US
- South Shore Line (Montreal), a proposed rapid transit line in Montreal, Quebec, Canada
- Southern Railway zone, in parts of coastal southern India
- the South Shore Line branch of the Oak Leaf Trail, a multi-use recreational trail system within Milwaukee County in the state of Wisconsin

== See also ==
- Shoreline (disambiguation)
- South Shore (disambiguation)
- North Shore Line (disambiguation)
