= North Shore Line =

North Shore Line could refer to one of several railway lines:

- North Shore Line (New York), a former trolley line on the north shore of Long Island, New York, United States
- North Shore Line (Singapore), a scrapped proposal for a mass transit line in Singapore
- North Shore Line, New Zealand, a proposed railway line in Auckland, New Zealand
- North Shore railway line, in Sydney, Australia
- North Shore Branch, on Staten Island, New York, United States
- Chicago North Shore and Milwaukee Railroad, in Illinois and Wisconsin, United States, also known as the North Shore Line

== See also ==
- North Shore (disambiguation)
- North Shore Branch
- North Shore Railroad (disambiguation)
- Shoreline (disambiguation)
- South Shore Line (disambiguation)
