= Academy 360, Sunderland =

Academy 360

Location
- Portsmouth Road; Pennywell; Sunderland, Tyne and Wear, SR4 9BA; England; 54.8969°N 1.4446°W

Information
- Type: Academy
- Established: 1967
- Local authority: Sunderland City Council
- Department for Education URN: 145477 Tables
- Ofsted: Reports
- Principal: Denise Taylor
- Deputy Principal: Greg Stephenson
- Gender: Mixed
- Age: 4 to 16
- Website: Official website

Academy 360 (formerly Pennywell Comprehensive School) is a mixed all-through school located in the Pennywell area of Sunderland, Tyne and Wear, England.

Pennywell Comprehensive School was built in 1967. In 2008 the school converted to academy status and was renamed Academy 360. In the same year the school relocated to a new building on the same site and the old building was demolished. Academy 360 was initially sponsored by Sunderland City Council, Sir Bob Murray and the Gentoo social housing group. In 2016, the DfE appointed the Laidlaw Schools Trust as the Academy's new sponsor.

Academy 360 offers GCSEs and BTECs as programmes of study for pupils. Most graduating students go on to attend Sunderland College which acts as the school's partner further education provider. Academy 360 also operates 'The Achievement Centre' which offers alternative education for small numbers of pupils from across Sunderland.
