= North Shore, Nova Scotia =

North Shore, Nova Scotia may refer to:

- North Shore (Nova Scotia), an economic region
- North Shore, Cumberland, Nova Scotia
- North Shore, an unincorporated area in the Municipality of the County of Victoria
