= Southmoor Academy =

Location
- Ryhope Road; Grangetown; Sunderland, Tyne and Wear, SR2 7TF; England; 54.89022°N 1.37604°W

Information
- Type: Academy
- Motto: Aspire, Achieve, Enjoy
- Local authority: Sunderland City Council
- Department for Education URN: 138103 Tables
- Ofsted: Reports
- Headteacher: Joanne Maw
- Gender: Coeducational
- Age: 11 to 18
- Enrolment: 1,053 (Approx.)
- Houses: Griffin Pegasus Phoenix Triton
- Website: www.southmoorschool.co.uk

Southmoor Academy (formerly Southmoor Community School) is a coeducational secondary school and sixth form located in the Grangetown area of Sunderland, Tyne and Wear, England.

== History ==
Previously a community school administered by Sunderland City Council, Southmoor Community School converted to academy status in May 2012 and was renamed Southmoor Academy. However, the school continues to coordinate with Sunderland City Council for admissions.

== Curriculum ==
Southmoor Academy offers GCSEs and Cambridge Nationals as programs of study for pupils, while students in the sixth form have the option to study from a range of A-levels. Students can also take part in the Duke of Edinburgh's Award program.

== Social mobility ==
The school was awarded School of the Year in the social mobility in the United Kingdom awards in 2019. A third of children at the school are eligible to receive pupil premium. The head of school is a member of the government's Social Mobility Commission.

== School performance and inspections ==
As of 2026, the school's most recent inspection by Ofsted was in 2022, with an outcome of Good.
