= Ryhope =

Village in Tyne and Wear, England

Coordinates: 54.8679°N 1.3698°W

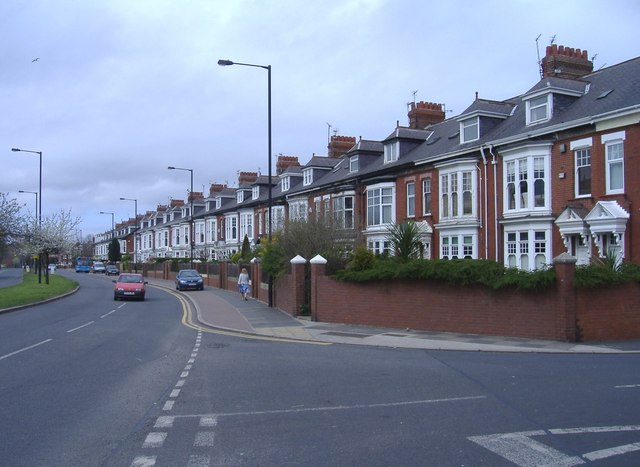
- Ryhope Road

- Location within Tyne and Wear
- Population: 10,484 (2011.Ward)
- Metropolitan borough: Sunderland
- Metropolitan county: Tyne and Wear
- Region: North East
- Country: England
- Sovereign state: United Kingdom
- Post town: SUNDERLAND
- Postcode district: SR2
- Dialling code: 0191
- Police: Northumbria
- Fire: Tyne and Wear
- Ambulance: North East
- UK Parliament: Sunderland Central

Ryhope (/ˈraɪ.əp/ RY-əp) is a coastal village along the southern boundary of the City of Sunderland, in Tyne and Wear, England. With a population of approximately 14,000, measured at 10.484 in the 2011 census, Ryhope is 2.9 miles to the centre of Sunderland, 2.8 miles to the centre of Seaham, and 1.2 miles from the main A19.

The older village section is centred on a triangular 'green', which contains a war monument. The newer 'Colliery' area of Ryhope flanks the Ryhope Street/Tunstall Bank Road, which leads toward the Tunstall and Silksworth areas of Sunderland.

== Geography and administration ==
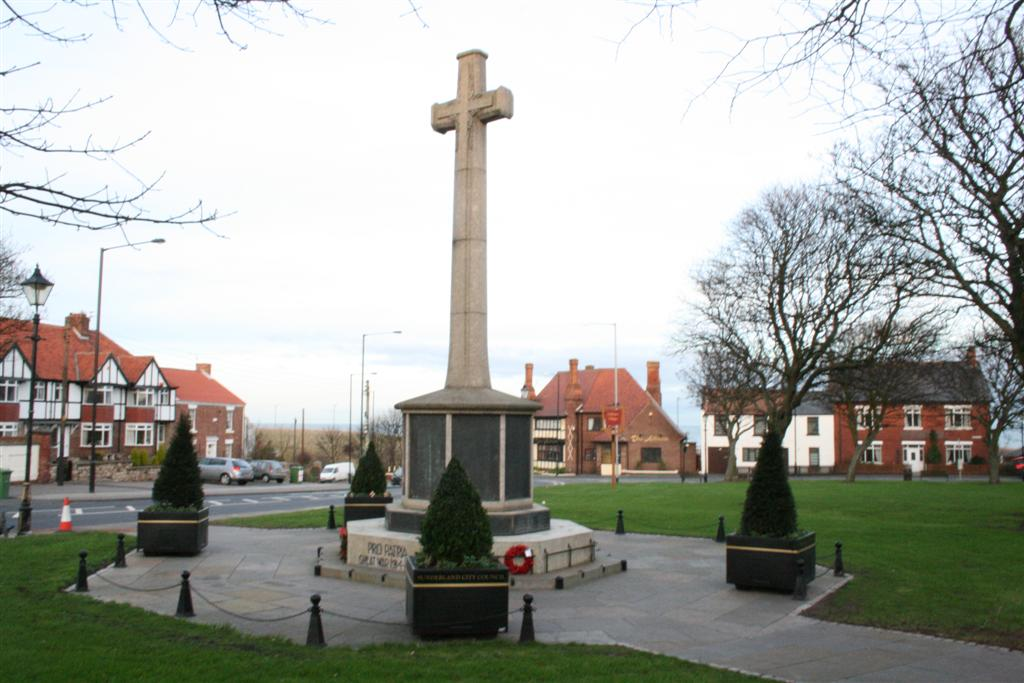
Ryhope Village Green

The A1018 'Southern Radial Route', which opened in 2008, bypasses Ryhope along the clifftops and takes traffic toward the Port of Sunderland in Hendon and other routes to the centre and north of Sunderland.

The B1287 Sea View Road links Ryhope with the town of Seaham to the south.

Ryhope is surrounded by farmland meaning it is a relatively isolated suburb of Sunderland. A number of cycle routes run through the village, including the National Cycle Network Route number 1 which is looked after by a local team of Sustrans Rangers.

Located to the south-west of the village is Cherry Knowle Hospital which is part of the South of Tyne and Wearside Mental Health NHS Trust. It has long been the main mental health services complex for the Wearside area. The Ryhope Engines Museum is also located in this area.

Ryhope was part of the Houghton and Washington East constituency until its abolition at the 2010 general election. Since then, it has formed part of the Sunderland Central constituency.

Ryhope was formerly a township and chapelry in the parish of Bishop-Wearmouth, in 1866 Ryhope became a separate civil parish, on 1 April 1967 the parish was abolished and merged with Sunderland and Seaham. In 1961 the parish had a population of 9796.

== History ==
Ryhope (from the Old English reof hoppas, meaning "rough valley") is first mentioned in 930 AD when king Athelstan granted the land of Bishopwearmouth (including the township of Ryhope) to the Bishop of Chester-le-Street. The land had been reclaimed from the Vikings who had captured it in 918 AD.

Ryhope has a strong history of farming; in 1183 there were 22 recorded villeins who provided the landowner with cattle and crops. In 1380 the population had swelled to approximately 150. In 1860 common grazing land was split into plots, which radiated out in strips from the village green. Ryhope's proximity to the sea has allowed it to serve as a seaside destination for centuries. The beach is said to have been a favourite sea-bathing spot for the Bishop of Durham.

Located on the Durham coalfield, Ryhope followed the path of many other villages in the area, and abandoned agriculture as the main employer in favour of coal. In 1859 a colliery was opened, causing huge changes in the geography of the village. The settlement of Ryhope extended west toward the area of Tunstall, creating two distinct areas of Ryhope; the 'Village' and the 'Colliery' (the post-World War II, council-built estate of 'Hollycarrside' forms a third section.) Railway lines were introduced to the area, linking Ryhope to Sunderland, Seaham and other Durham Coalfield mining villages. Now only a single railway line runs through the village, and there is no longer a station. The colliery was closed in 1966.

A bronze statue of a pit pony was erected on a plinth on the Stockton Road entrance to Ryhope in 2009 by the Ryhope Development Trust. The statue was stolen for a second time in October 2021; its subsequently replacement with toys, teddy bears and rocking horses gained viral popularity online in 2023. In August 2024, a second, separate metal statue of a pit pony was also stolen.

=== World War II ===
In March 1944 Ryhope was the scene of the conclusion of the epic last flight of the Handley Page Halifax bomber LK797 from RAF Bomber Command's raid on Nuremberg, which crash-landed in Ryhope, resulting in Pilot Officer Cyril Barton being posthumously awarded the Victoria Cross.

== Sport ==
Ryhope was formerly home to two football clubs, however that number now turning into 1: Ryhope Colliery and Sunderland Ryhope Community Association (RCA). Ryhope Colliery Welfare disbanded in 2022 due to financial difficulties, while Sunderland RCA faced similar pressures but avoided closure.

== Notable people ==
- Mick Buxton, former Sunderland AFC manager
- Ronald Radd, actor
- Nicola Sturgeon, First Minister of Scotland from 2014 into the 2020s, has family connections to the area, her paternal grandmother having been born in Ryhope.
- Simon Fenton, actor and columnist

== Tourism ==
Ryhope Engines Museum, which is based on the Ryhope Pumping Station, was built in 1868 to supply water to the Sunderland area.

Among natural features, Ryhope adjoins Tunstall Hills which have views of the city of Sunderland and beyond (on a clear day, down the coast almost to Whitby). The Tunstall Hills are located on the southern outskirts of Sunderland between (New) Silksworth and Ryhope. The disused quarries and cuttings at Tunstall Hills provide exposure through part of the Magnesian Limestone succession of Permian age. The slopes on the "Maiden Paps" section support species such as blue moor-grass, common rock-rose, perennial flax and locally uncommon plants such as Frog Orchid, Autumn Gentian and Purple Milk-Vetch. These areas have been designated a "site of special scientific interest" (SSSI).

Ryhope is also home to the world's first (and so far only) listed Pigeon Cree.
