= Castle View Enterprise Academy =

Location
- Cartwright Road; Sunderland, Tyne and Wear, SR5 3DX; England
- Coordinates: 54°55′05″N 1°26′53″W

Information
- Type: Academy
- Established: 7th of September, 2009
- Local authority: Tyne and Wear
- Department for Education URN: 135818 Tables
- Ofsted: Reports
- Chair of Governors: Heidi Mottram
- Head teacher: Jo Owens
- Gender: Mixed
- Age: 11 to 16
- Enrolment: 1028
- Colours: Green, White, Black and Purple.
- Website: http://www.castleviewenterpriseacademy.co.uk/

Castle View Enterprise Academy (Formerly Castle View School) is a Sponsored Academy in Sunderland, England.

== History ==
Castle View School was officially opened in 1960 and extended in 1972. The extensive site is situated to the north west of Sunderland and is bounded by the Hylton Dene and within sight of the historic Hylton Castle. The urban catchment area incorporates the former mining village of Castletown and the post war housing estates of Hylton Castle and Town End Farm.

In 2009 it became one of the original 200 sponsored academies in England. These were the most challenging schools in the country with a history of poor educational performance. Taken out of local authority control it is now sponsored by Northumbrian Water Limited. During the conversion it changed its name to Castle View Enterprise Academy. The academy opened in 2009 in £17 million new buildings on the site of its predecessor school.

== School characteristics ==
The school is in an area with significant social and economic deprivation, and free school meals eligibility currently stands at 44.5% with around 457 pupils eligible for free school meals. .

The principal of the school is Janet Bridges, who received an OBE in the 2013 New Years Honours list for her services to education.

The academy is currently rated as "Good" by OFSTED as of June 2023. Castle View has received the same rating on all of the academy's OFSTED inspections (March 2011, January 2012, March 2017 and June 2023). Castle View Enterprise Academy received these rating's for good Quality of Education, Behaviour and Attitudes, Personal Development and Leadership and Management; its results have passed national averages, making it one of the highest performing schools in the City of Sunderland and the North East. In 2009 the predecessor school closed on 26% 5A-C. The results since have increased each year: 2010 = 43%; 2011 = 54%; 2012 = 67%; 2013 = 68%. This rapid rise was recognised in 2014 with an award from the SSAT (Specialist Schools and Academies Trust) for most improved academy.
