= ESPA College =

Location
- 6-7 the Cloisters, Ashbrooke; Sunderland, Tyne and Wear, SR2 7BD; England

Information
- Type: Private specialist college
- Established: 1992
- Local authority: Sunderland City Council
- Department for Education URN: 131872 Tables
- Ofsted: Reports
- Principal: Patrick Cahill
- Gender: Mixed
- Age range: 16–25
- Capacity: 110
- Website: www.espa.org.uk/college

ESPA College is part of Education & Services for People with Autism in Ashbrooke, Sunderland, Tyne and Wear, England. The college provides various services for people on the autistic spectrum. The college management team is located in the same buildings as the students. It educates young people aged 16–25. It was recognised in a 2010 OFSTED report as having good overall effectiveness.

== History ==
Opened in 1992, the college has provided a unique educational experience for learners. All learners follow a tailor-made curriculum, which is a programme of study and support specifically designed to meet the social, educational and emotional needs of the young adults that study there. Every learner has an Individual Learning Plan specific to their needs, which includes targets drawn from Education, Health & Care Plans.

ESPA aims to provide people with autism spectrum disorders (ASD) and other related disorders with an inclusive education.

The College is currently managed by a team of four people: Lesley Lane is the Chief Executive, Patrick Cahill is the Principal and Mike Smith is the Admissions, Placements & Transitions Manager. Each site has its own management structure which includes college co-ordinators.

=== Sites ===
ESPA College is split into five sites, named Ashleigh (a Hall of Residence), North Rye, South Hill, Tithebarn and Tasker. South Hill is located in the Cedars, Sunderland and Tasker is located at the Elms, Sunderland. North Rye is located in Kenton, Newcastle upon Tyne. Ashleigh is located in Gosforth, Newcastle. Tithebarn is located in Stockton on Tees, next to North Tees Hospital.

=== Education and Services for People with Autism ===
As of 1 October 2008, ESPA College has slightly changed its name to reflect the practices of the colleges. It is now known as Education and Services for People with Autism rather than European Services for People with Autism.
