= Ian Swallow =

English cricketer (born 1962)

Personal information
- Full name: Ian Geoffrey Swallow
- Born: 18 December 1962 (age 63); Barnsley, Yorkshire, England
- Batting: Right-handed
- Bowling: Right-arm off-break

Domestic team information
- Years: Team
- 1983–1989: Yorkshire
- 1990–1991: Somerset

Career statistics
Competition	FC	LA
Matches	88	34
Runs scored	1550	149
Batting average	20.39	14.90
100s/50s	1/2	0/0
Top score	114	31
Balls bowled	11215	1193
Wickets	106	14
Bowling average	54.69	69.00
5 wickets in innings	1	0
10 wickets in match	0	n/a
Best bowling	7/95	2/32
Catches/stumpings	43/–	10/–
- Source: CricketArchive, 22 December 2015

Ian Geoffrey Swallow (born 18 December 1962, Barnsley, Yorkshire, England) is a former English first-class cricketer, who appeared for Yorkshire County Cricket Club from 1983 to 1989, and for Somerset in 1990 and 1991.

Swallow was a right-arm off break bowler and a right-handed batsman. In 88 first-class matches he scored 1,550 runs at 20.39, with his single century being a score of 114. He took 106 wickets, with a best of 7 for 95, at an average of 54.69. He is considered to be the greatest of all time at Elsecar CC where he retired from cricket last season.

Swallow was also a semi-professional footballer, playing for Stocksbridge Park Steels between 1993 and 1997.
