= Bishopwearmouth Rectory =

A 19th-century drawing of the former rectory building before its demolition

Bishopwearmouth Rectory was a medieval clerical manor which once dominated the village of Bishopwearmouth, of which is now Sunderland, Tyne and Wear. Overseen by the Bishop of Durham, the rectory hosted many royal officials and papal officers, often appointed in absentee. Throughout the centuries this included notable figures such as Adam Marsh, Simon Langham and Robert of Geneva.

The Rectory had a sprawling estate consisting of 130 acres of land spanning westwards consisting of what is now Chester Road and Bishopwearmouth Cemetery, as well as a tithe barn and a park consisting of 31 additional acres around the River Wear.

Rebuilt in the 17th century, Bishopwearmouth rectory was demolished in the year 1855 but its doorway arch was subsequently reinstalled in the newly built Mowbray Park where a modern recreation of its door was constructed in the 1990s. The site of the former rectory is now occupied by the Sunderland Empire Theatre.
