= Manor Community Academy =

Location
- Owton Manor Lane; Hartlepool, County Durham, TS25 3PS; England
- Coordinates: 54.657°N 1.240°W

Information
- Type: Academy
- Motto: Outcomes Focused, Child Centred
- Local authority: Hartlepool
- Trust: Northern Education Trust
- Department for Education URN: 141686 Tables
- Ofsted: Reports
- Principal: Steven Jones
- Gender: mixed
- Age: 11 to 16
- Enrolment: 1218
- Website: mca.northerneducationtrust.org

Manor Community Academy is a secondary school in the Owton Manor area of Hartlepool, County Durham. It is an academy school which caters for students aged 11 to 16. It is part of the Northern Education Trust. The school has approximately 1218 students.

== History ==
Manor Community Academy was established in 2016, when taken over by multi-academy trust, Northern Education Trust. Before 2016, it stood as local authority owned, Manor College of Technology. As of May 2022, the old swimming pool has been demolished.

== Senior leadership team ==
Manor Community Academy is run by Northern Education Trust, with Steven Jones as Principal since December 2023.

== School achievement and OFSTED Ratings ==
Northern Education Trust, Manor Community Academy, is Hartlepool's second highest performing school, and as of September 2021, was rated 'GOOD' by OFSTED, an improvement from 2018 when it was given a 'requires improvement' rating.
