= Kearsley Academy =

Location
- Springfield Road; Kearsley, Greater Manchester, BL4 8HY; England
- Coordinates: 53.53875°N 2.38756°W

Information
- Type: Academy
- Local authority: Bolton Council
- Trust: Northern Education Trust
- Department for Education URN: 136135 Tables
- Ofsted: Reports
- Gender: Coeducational
- Age: 11 to 16
- Enrolment: 637 as of February 2021
- Capacity: 950
- Website: http://ka.northerneducationtrust.org

Kearsley Academy (formerly George Tomlinson School) is a coeducational secondary school with academy status sponsored by Northern Education Trust. It is located in Kearsley in the English county of Greater Manchester.

Previously a foundation school administered by Bolton Metropolitan Borough Council, George Tomlinson School converted to academy status in September 2010 and was renamed Kearsley Academy. However the school continues to coordinate with Bolton Metropolitan Borough Council for admissions. The school relocated to new buildings in 2014.

== Description ==
Kearsley Academy offers GCSEs and BTECs as programmes of study for pupils. The school also specialises in mathematics and computing.

In 2018, Kearsley Academy came under scrutiny for its lack of action against a teacher who bullied a child due to the colour of her hair, as well as sending two boys home from school because their school shoes were "deemed incorrect" and did not match the school's uniform policy.

There was a substantial increase in the 5 GCSE with Maths and English pass rate. It was judged one of the 20 most improved schools in the country.
