= Venerable Bede Church of England Academy =

Location
- Tunstall Bank; Tunstall; Sunderland, Tyne and Wear, SR2 0SX; England; 54.86994°N 1.36356°W

Information
- Type: Academy
- Motto: Soar to the heights together
- Religious affiliation: Church of England
- Established: 2002
- Local authority: Sunderland City Council
- Department for Education URN: 139184 Tables
- Ofsted: Reports
- Head of School: Tracey Burgess
- Gender: Coeducational
- Age: 11 to 16
- Enrolment: 903 as of February 2020
- Capacity: 900
- Website: www.venerablebede.co.uk

The Venerable Bede Church of England Academy (formerly Venerable Bede Church of England (Aided) Secondary School) is a coeducational secondary school located in the Tunstall area of Ryhope, Sunderland, Tyne and Wear, England. The school is named after Saint Bede, a monk, author and scholar who wrote Historia ecclesiastica gentis Anglorum.

== History ==
The Venerable Bede Church of England (Aided) Secondary School opened in 2002 on the former site of Ryhope Colliery and later Ryhope golf course. It was a voluntary aided school administered by Sunderland City Council and the Church of England Diocese of Durham. This converted to academy status and was renamed The Venerable Bede Church of England Academy. While it is still administered by the diocese, the school is independent of the city council. It continues to coordinate with Sunderland City Council for admissions.

== Description ==
The Venerable Bede CE Academy has 700-800 pupils, making it smaller than most secondary schools. Despite its Christian origins and ethos, the school welcomes pupils of all faiths and none. It has a number of purpose-built facilities, including a large professional sports hall. It offers a dynamic and broad curriculum and a wide range of extra-curricular activities. As a Church of England school it has a Christian ethos, it conducts morning worship ceremonies and observes traditional Christian holidays and events.

== Academics ==
Ofsted confirms that the outcomes for pupils is good.

The school operates a two year, Key Stage 3 where all the core National Curriculum subjects are taught. Year 7 start with six hours a fortnight of English, Maths and Science. There are Four hours of Religious Studies, Geography, History, Spanish and Physical Education, and two hours of Personal Development, Art, and Music. Four hours of Design Technology and Computer Science are taught using a half-termly carousel system, where pupils experience: Graphics, Resistant Materials, Food, Textiles and Computer Science.

In Years 9, 10 and 11, that is in Key Stage 4 students study a core of Maths, English, Science for 8 hours per fortnight and Humanities (Geography/History)Religious Education for 5. Core PE and PD / PSHE done for 2 hours each. They then have two optional subjects chosen from: Food, Resistant Materials, Music, Art, ICT, BTEC Business, Media Studies, Spanish, Textiles, GCSE/BTEC PE, BTEC Health & Social Care, BTEC Travel & Tourism which they study for 5 hours each.

There are programmes in place to support pupils who enter the school with low levels of attainment so their reading skills develop quickly as a result, Generally disadvantaged pupils and those who have special educational needs or disability make as much progress as other pupils across a broad range of subjects. However the gap in attainment at the end of year 11 between disadvantaged pupils and other pupils in the school remain relatively wide.
