= North Shore Lions =

Football organization in Montreal, Quebec, Canada

The North Shore Lions football organization is currently a member of the QBFL (Quebec Bantam Football League) operating in the West Island of Montreal, Quebec, Canada. This organization was founded in 1967 when the local teams were struggling to find talented kids to play football. Since 1967 the North Shore Lions have won 38 provincial championships.

== About North Shore football ==
The North Shore Football League plays host to teams for children aged 6–13. The different age groups are Atom (6-9 year olds), Mosquito (10-11 year olds), PeeWee (12-13 year olds), Bantam (14-15 year olds) and Midget (16-17 year olds). The first three (Atom, Mosquito and PeeWee) are hosted through a series of parks. The Bantam Lions play in Quebec Bantam Football League's (QBFL) Bill Allan division which is the Bantam AAA first division. The Midget Mustangs play in Quebec Midget Football League's (QMFL) Bruno Heppell division which is the Midget AAA division.

== Team history ==
In the early to mid-1960s, the North Shore Football League was still in its infancy and at the time there were four bantam teams that played amongst themselves in a house-league system. The names that were chosen for these teams were taken from the western teams in the CFL. These were the Eskimos, Stampeders, Bombers, and Lions, who, at the time, were playing their home games at Rive Boisée park. As it was becoming increasingly difficult to find enough players to make four bantam teams, a decision was made in 1966 to disband the four-team system and to create one elite team that was going to compete the following year at the inter-city level in the fledgling Metropolitan Bantam Football League (MBFL). They still needed to come up with a name for the team so it was decided that whichever of the four existing teams won what would be the last North Shore championship that year, their name would be used for the new inter-city team that was to begin competing the following year in 1967. As it happened, the Lions won that last championship and this was the creation of the team that we now know today.

In their inaugural season, under the guidance of their first head coach, Ron Hutchison, they began what was to become a winning streak of 42 straight games without a loss and their first of many provincial championship titles. In 1980, the MBFL fell into the jurisdiction of the Quebec Amateur Football Federation (QAFF) and changed to what we now know as the Quebec Bantam Football League (QBFL). The original MBFL championship trophy was retired and was presented by Bill Allan, then president of the MBFL and founding father of the North Shore Football League, to the Lions for having won the most championships during the time the MBFL existed.
