= North Shore Railroad =

North Shore Railroad could refer to:

- Chicago North Shore and Milwaukee Railroad (North Shore Line)
- North Shore Railroad (Pennsylvania)
- North Shore Railroad (Long Island)
- North Shore Railroad (California)

== See also ==
- North Shore Branch
- North Shore Line (disambiguation)
