= Hetton Academy =

Location
- North Road; Hetton-le-Hole; City of Sunderland, Tyne and Wear, DH5 9JZ; England; 54.818°N 1.4599°W

Information
- Type: Academy
- Established: 1912
- Local authority: Sunderland City Council
- Trust: Northern Education Trust
- Department for Education URN: 149235 Tables
- Ofsted: Reports
- Principal: Vicky Pinkney
- Gender: Coeducational
- Age: 11 to 16
- Enrolment: 575 as of April 2022
- Website: hta.northerneducationtrust.org

Hetton Academy (formerly Hetton School) is a coeducational secondary school located in Hetton-le-Hole in the City of Sunderland, Tyne and Wear, England.

== History ==
Established in 1912, the school admits pupils mainly from Easington Lane Primary School, Eppleton Academy, Hetton Primary School and Hetton Lyons Primary School.

=== Hetton School ===
On Thursday September 14, 1995 at lunchtime, 25-year-old PE teacher Michelle Vernon was attacked in the gym changing rooms. Two thieves hit her head against a wall, and kicked her in the face. She had worked there for only two weeks. Two suspects were arrested in late September.

=== Academy ===
Previously a community school administered by Sunderland City Council, in September 2022 Hetton School converted to academy status and was renamed Hetton Academy. The school is now sponsored by the Northern Education Trust.

=== New buildings ===
A new school building was constructed on the same site and was completed in September 2016. The new building was officially opened by the local Member of Parliament, Bridget Phillipson, on 13 January 2017.

== Admissions ==
Hetton Academy offers GCSEs and Cambridge Nationals as programmes of study for pupils. Most graduating students go on to attend Headways Sixth Form, a sixth form provision offered by a consortium of secondary schools (including Hetton Academy) and Sunderland College.

== Standards ==
The Academy was rated Good in a 2024 Ofsted inspection.

== Notable people ==
- Jordan Cook, footballer
- Steph Houghton, footballer
- Ryan Pringle, cricketer
