= Bishopwearmouth =

Area of Sunderland city centre in Tyne and Wear, England

Coordinates: 54.90582°N 1.388785°W

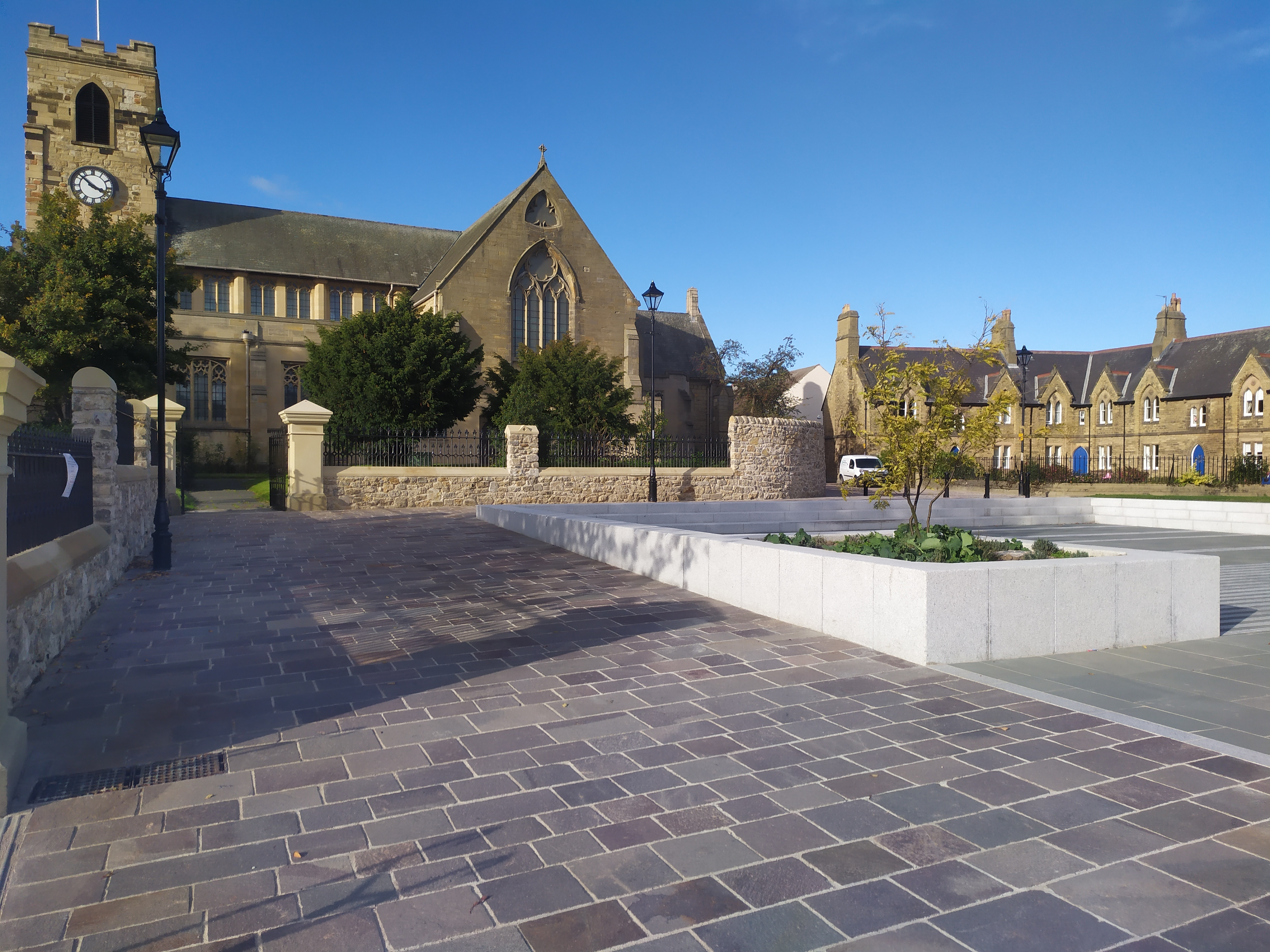
- Sunderland Minster the historical church of Bishopwearmouth, along with the renovated village green in 2020.

- Location within Tyne and Wear
- Population: 14,000
- Metropolitan borough: Sunderland
- Metropolitan county: Tyne and Wear
- Region: North East
- Country: England
- Sovereign state: United Kingdom
- Post town: SUNDERLAND
- Postcode district: SR1
- Dialling code: 0191
- Police: Northumbria
- Fire: Tyne and Wear
- Ambulance: North East
- UK Parliament: Sunderland South

Bishopwearmouth (/ˌbɪʃəpˈwɪərmaʊθ/) is a former village and parish which now constitutes the west side of Sunderland City Centre, in the county of Tyne and Wear, England. It merged with the settlement when it expanded outwards in the 18th and 19th centuries. It is home to the Sunderland Minster church, which has stood at the heart of the settlement since the early Middle Ages. Until 1974, it was part of County Durham.

== History ==
Bishopwearmouth was one of the original three settlements on the banks of the River Wear that merged to form modern Sunderland. The settlement was formed in 930 when King Æthelstan granted the lands to the Bishop of Durham. The settlement on the opposite side of the river, Monkwearmouth, had been founded 250 years earlier.

The lands on the south side of the river became known as Bishopwearmouth or sometimes "South Wearmouth", a parish that covered around twenty square miles (52 km^{2}). The land consisted of a number of smaller townships which would eventually include Ryhope, Silksworth, Ford and Tunstall, all now part of the suburbs of the city. The original church was built in the 10th century and surrounding it was the Green, which was the centre of life for centuries. The core of the settlement was divided into three main streets, which continue to adhere to their medieval shape today, High Row, Low Row and the Lonnin (now Sunderland High Street). The latter street connected Bishopwearmouth to another settlement, Sunderland, which was a small fishing port at the mouth of the river.

The early medieval village was dominated by the Church Rectory, of which the tenants were described as very wealthy. The Rectory owned 130 acres of land spanning westwards consisting of what is now Chester Road and Bishopwearmouth Cemetery, as well as a tithe barn and a park consisting of 31 additional acres around the river.

By the 18th century Sunderland had grown in importance and size, and in 1719 was made into an independent parish with the creation of the Holy Trinity Church. Prior to modern urbanisation, Bishopwearmouth Burn used to follow adjacent to the village and into the River Wear.

In 1855, the rectory was eventually demolished, but its doorway arch was subsequently reinstalled in the newly built Mowbray Park.

In 1891 the parish had a population of 87,648. On 25 March 1897 the parish was abolished and merged with Sunderland. It is now in the unparished area of Sunderland.

In the 1990s, local artists subsequently recreated the old rectory door and its signature lion knocker with it.

On 11 February 1998, the Bishopwearmouth Christ Church was declared redundant, and later sold to become a Sikh temple and community centre. In 1998 the church of Bishopwearmouth, St Michael's, became Sunderland Minster.

== Shipbuilding ==
In the 1780s, the shipyard of Thomas Nicholson at Bishopwearmouth Panns was one of several shipyards which were 'constantly employed' on the Wear

== Notable people ==
Major-General Sir Henry Havelock, a military leader during the Indian Mutiny, was born in Bishopwearmouth on 5 April 1795, as was Joseph Swan, famous for the invention of the incandescent light bulb, on 31 October 1828.

Rev William Scott Moncreiff was vicar of Christ's Church in the 19th century.

The physician and antiquarian Thomas Coke Squance was from Bishopwearmouth.

Women's suffrage activist Helen Kirkpatrick Watts (1881–1972) was born in the village.

== Sources ==
- Dodds, Glen Lyndon (2011). A History of Sunderland (Third ed.). Sunderland: Albion Press. ISBN 978-0-9525122-2-6.
