= North Shore Academy, Stockton-on-Tees =

North Shore Academy

Location
- Talbot Street; Stockton-on-Tees, County Durham, TS20 2AY; England; 54°34′55″N 1°18′00″W

Information
- Type: Academy
- Trust: Northern Education Trust
- Department for Education URN: 136146 Tables
- Ofsted: Reports
- Head teacher: Michael Robson (executive head); Andrew Murphy
- Gender: Co-educational
- Age: 11 to 16
- Website: nsa.northerneducationtrust.org

The North Shore Academy is a secondary school in Stockton-on-Tees, North East England. The school was opened in 2010, and replaced Blakeston School and Norton Comprehensive School. The main campus of the Academy was situated on the old Blakeston School site. The academy has now moved to a new site on Talbot Street, Stockton-on-Tees. The school's name was changed from North Shore Health Academy to North Shore Academy in September 2012, following the change of sponsors from NHS Stockton to the Northern Education Trust.

== Discipline ==
Teachers and councillors raised concerns over high exclusion rates in Northern Education Trust schools, after 40.3% of North Shore Academy pupils were excluded at least once in 2017–2018 against a national average of 2.3%. This was the second highest rate in the country.

== Ofsted Reports ==
Since 2010, North Shore Academy has had five Ofsted full inspections, with its first rated as inadequate on 18 January 2012. On 7 July 2021 it was rated as outstanding.
