= New Silksworth =

Suburb in Tyne and Wear, England

Coordinates: 54.8710°N 1.3957°W

Silksworth
- Silksworth Park and Sports Complex, which was built upon the site of the former Colliery

- Location within Tyne and Wear
- Population: 10,194 (2020 estimate)
- Metropolitan borough: Sunderland
- Metropolitan county: Tyne and Wear
- Region: North East
- Country: England
- Sovereign state: United Kingdom
- Post town: Sunderland
- Postcode district: SR3
- Police: Northumbria
- Fire: Tyne and Wear
- Ambulance: North East
- UK Parliament: Houghton and Sunderland South

Silksworth is a suburb of Sunderland, Tyne and Wear, England. The area can be distinguished into two parts, Old Silksworth, the original village and township which has existed since the early middle ages, and New Silksworth, the industrial age colliery village which expanded north west of the original settlement. The former colliery being situated to the north west of the village near to the Gilley Law. The population of the ward was 10,931 at the 2011 census.

== History ==
Silksworth was historically a township in the ancient parish of Bishop Wearmouth, in 1866, the legal definition of 'parish' was changed to be the areas used for administering the poor laws, and so Silksworth became a civil parish. In 1894 Silksworth became part of Houghton le Spring Rural District of County Durham, in 1937 Silksworth became part of Sunderland Rural District, on 1 April 1967 the parish was abolished and merged with Sunderland and Houghton-le-Spring and became part of the County Borough of Sunderland and Houghton-le-Spring Urban District. At the 1961 census (the last before the abolition of the parish), Silksworth had a population of 2799. In 1974 Silksworth became part of Sunderland metropolitan district in the metropolitan county of Tyne and Wear.

=== Old Silksworth ===
The area of Silksworth has been subject to human activity since the Bronze Age, with archaeological sites of ancient barrows having been discovered on the surrounding hills. The name of the place itself is thought to be of Anglo-Saxon origin and means 'the worþ (enclosure) of Sigelac (a man's name)'. The first reference to the location appeared in the Middle Ages and is first referenced in a list of appendages of South Bishopwearmouth in King Æthelstan’s gift to the See of Durham in 930 AD. The area became a township of Bishopwearmouth, of which neighbouring Farringdon was a hamlet.

=== New Silksworth ===
New Silksworth emerged as a coal mining village in the 19th century. In 1871, according to the Census there were approximately 800 people living in the Silksworth and Tunstall areas. The local area was mainly farmland and most people worked on the land. However about 350 were men and their families who were constructing the new colliery. To exploit the rich coal reserves in the area the Silksworth Colliery shaft was sunk in 1869, funded by the Londonderry Coal company. Ten years later in 1879 the local population had risen to 4707 for the Silksworth and Tunstall areas. The increase in population was mainly due to the migration of people to the area seeking work at the new Silksworth colliery. According to the census returns the miners came from Ireland, Scotland, Cornwall and even from the United States and Germany. The miners and their families had moved to the colliery areas seeking employment and also colliery housing was provided for the miners by the mine owner Lord Londonderry. The miner's life was not an easy one, working conditions underground were very dangerous and the work very arduous. When Silksworth Colliery eventually closed in 1971 it was a massive blow to the local community as many of the local people and businesses relied on the colliery for their livelihood. Just about all remnants of the former Silksworth colliery have now gone, and the former mine site has since been converted into Silksworth Sports Complex. Facilities at the sports complex include:

- Silksworth Ski Slope the North East of England's largest artificial ski slope and activity centre. This is featured on the Sunderland version of the boardgame Monopoly!
- Recreational boating lake near Gilley Law which is home to a variety of water fowl birds, ducks, swans and also near the boating lake is a freshwater fishing lake.
- Silksworth Community Swimming Pool, Tennis and Wellness Centre formally The Puma Centre including a children's Outdoor Adventure Play Area which is a popular facility for kids and toddlers, with swings, zip wire, climbing frames, slides, sand pit and picnic area etc.
- Athletics Running track
- All-weather floodlit football pitches
- Skateboard park (Near the Ski slope)

=== Notable buildings ===
==== Doxford House ====
Doxford House, formerly Silksworth House, is an 18th-century manor house adjacent to Doxford Park in the Silksworth area of Sunderland, Tyne and Wear, England. It is a Grade II* listed building.

The manor house formerly known as Silksworth House was constructed in 1775–1780 by William Johnson, who on his death in 1792 left the property in his will to his friend Hendry Hopper. In 1831, Priscilla Hopper then heiress to the estate married William Beckwith of Thurcroft. He was High Sheriff of Durham in 1857. The Beckwiths moved to Shropshire in about 1890 and the house was let out.

In 1902, Charles David Doxford of William Doxford & Sons Ship Builders, brother of Theodore Doxford, took out a 99-year lease on the 24-acre estate. On his death in 1935, his daughter, Aline Doxford bought out the lease. On her death in 1968, she bequeathed the house and estate to Sunderland Corporation who gave the house its present name Doxford House, and turned the gardens of the house into Doxford Park.

In 1989, the house became a students’ hall of residence for Sunderland University, and from about 2000 to 2006 was occupied by the Lazarus Foundation, a drug rehabilitation charity. Plans to turn the house into apartments were proposed in 2008 but the conversion of the house into apartments was never carried out.

After standing empty for a number of years the building became run down and derelict. The house was sold to a private individual and has been fully refurbished and restored to its former glory. Currently, Doxford House has been fully restored and converted back into a private family residence.

==== The Miners Hall, Blind Lane ====
The Miners Hall is located in Blind Lane, Silksworth. The hall is a prominent building in Blind Lane and was built in 1893. The hall was a spacious building constructed of brick and stone. The building was used as a meeting place for the miners and their families, it was also used for social events, wedding receptions, engagement parties etc. The Silksworth Colliery Brass Band also practised and performed in the hall. The Miners’ hall front façade and roof was recently refurbished. The ground floor of the former miners hall is now currently used as a storage facility. Additionally, there is a professional music recording studio located in the building known as the Miners Hall studio, which website is minershallstudio.co.uk.

==== St Matthew’s Church, C of E Church ====
St Matthew's Church opened in 1872, three years after Silksworth Colliery opened in 1869. The Church played a large part in the formation of the new mining community of Silksworth with the input of miners and their families. The churchyard contains the Commonwealth war graves of 12 British servicemen of World War I and 4 of World War II.

==== St Leonard's RC Church ====
St Leonard's Roman Catholic Church opened in 1873, four years after Silksworth Colliery opened in 1869. The funding for the building of the church and rectory was provided by Priscilla Maria Beckwith of Silksworth House.

Located behind Blind Lane was the Ebenezer Chapel 1883 (now the Independent Methodist Church).

The Temperance Hall 1912, located at the top of Tunstall Terrace, is now the Calvary Christian Fellowship.

== Notable people ==
Mural of Bobby Gurney on the Golden Fleece Pub, Silksworth

- Michael P. Johnson - Christian Poet
- Joe Clennell – professional footballer
- Bobby Gurney – professional footballer and Sunderland record goalscorer
- Ernest Levitt – professional footballer for Brentford and also played for New Silksworth
- Richie Taylor – professional footballer for Sunderland (1968-1972) and York City
- Billy Thompson – British and European lightweight champion boxer, born in New Silkworth
- Keith Trotter – former cricketer
