= List of United Kingdom locations: Sow-Stao =

The United Kingdom

This is part of the list of United Kingdom locations: a gazetteer of place names in the United Kingdom showing each place's locality and geographical coordinates.

== So (continued) ==
=== Sow-Soy ===
Location	Locality	Coordinates (links to map & photo sources)	OS grid reference
Sowerby	Calderdale	53.70°N 01.94°W	SE0423
Sowerby	North Yorkshire	54.22°N 01.34°W	SE4381
Sowerby Bridge	Calderdale	53.70°N 01.91°W	SE0623
Sowerby Row	Cumbria	54.75°N 02.94°W	NY3940
Sower Carr	Lancashire	53.87°N 02.95°W	SD3743
Sowley Green	Suffolk	52.12°N 00.48°E	TL7050
Sowood	Calderdale	53.65°N 01.89°W	SE0718
Sowood Green	Calderdale	53.65°N 01.89°W	SE0718
Sowton	Devon	50.71°N 03.46°W	SX9792
Sowton Barton	Devon	50.67°N 03.65°W	SX8388
Soyal	Highland	57.88°N 04.41°W	NH5791
Soyland Town	Calderdale	53.67°N 01.95°W	SE0320

== Sp ==
Location	Locality	Coordinates (links to map & photo sources)	OS grid reference
Spacey Houses	North Yorkshire	53.95°N 01.52°W	SE3151
Spa Common	Norfolk	52.81°N 01.39°E	TG2930
Spalding	Lincolnshire	52.78°N 00.16°W	TF2422
Spaldington	East Riding of Yorkshire	53.78°N 00.84°W	SE7633
Spaldwick	Cambridgeshire	52.33°N 00.35°W	TL1272
Spalford	Nottinghamshire	53.21°N 00.75°W	SK8369
Spanby	Lincolnshire	52.92°N 00.37°W	TF0938
Spango	Inverclyde	55.92°N 04.83°W	NS2374
Spanish Green	Hampshire	51.31°N 01.01°W	SU6958
Sparham	Norfolk	52.72°N 01.06°E	TG0719
Sparhamhill	Norfolk	52.71°N 01.07°E	TG0818
Spark Bridge	Cumbria	54.24°N 03.07°W	SD3084
Sparkbrook	Birmingham	52.45°N 01.88°W	SP0884
Sparkford	Somerset	51.03°N 02.57°W	ST6026
Sparkhill	Birmingham	52.44°N 01.86°W	SP0983
Sparkwell	Devon	50.39°N 03.99°W	SX5857
Sparnon Gate	Cornwall	50.24°N 05.25°W	SW6843
Sparrow Green	Norfolk	52.68°N 00.88°E	TF9514
Sparrow Hill	Somerset	51.26°N 02.84°W	ST4152
Sparrowpit	Derbyshire	53.31°N 01.88°W	SK0880
Sparrow's Green	East Sussex	51.06°N 00.32°E	TQ6332
Sparsholt	Hampshire	51.07°N 01.38°W	SU4331
Sparsholt	Oxfordshire	51.58°N 01.51°W	SU3487
Spartylea	Northumberland	54.82°N 02.23°W	NY8548
Spath	Staffordshire	52.91°N 01.88°W	SK0835
Spaunton	North Yorkshire	54.29°N 00.89°W	SE7289
Spaxton	Somerset	51.12°N 03.11°W	ST2237
Spean Bridge	Highland	56.88°N 04.92°W	NN2281
Spearywell	Hampshire	51.04°N 01.55°W	SU3127
Speckington	Somerset	51.00°N 02.62°W	ST5623
Speed Gate	Kent	51.36°N 00.25°E	TQ5765
Speedwell	City of Bristol	51.46°N 02.53°W	ST6374
Speen	Berkshire	51.40°N 01.33°W	SU4668
Speen	Buckinghamshire	51.68°N 00.78°W	SU8499
Speeton	North Yorkshire	54.14°N 00.25°W	TA1474
Speke	Liverpool	53.34°N 02.84°W	SJ4483
Speldhurst	Kent	51.14°N 00.21°E	TQ5541
Spellbrook	Hertfordshire	51.83°N 00.14°E	TL4817
Spelsbury	Oxfordshire	51.88°N 01.50°W	SP3421
Spelter	Bridgend	51.62°N 03.66°W	SS8593
Spen	Kirklees	53.72°N 01.71°W	SE1925
Spencers Wood	Berkshire	51.38°N 00.98°W	SU7166
Spen Green	Cheshire	53.13°N 02.28°W	SJ8160
Spennells	Worcestershire	52.36°N 02.23°W	SO8474
Spennithorne	North Yorkshire	54.29°N 01.80°W	SE1389
Spennymoor	Durham	54.69°N 01.61°W	NZ2533
Spernall	Warwickshire	52.25°N 01.88°W	SP0862
Spetchley	Worcestershire	52.17°N 02.16°W	SO8953
Spetisbury	Dorset	50.81°N 02.12°W	ST9102
Spexhall	Suffolk	52.36°N 01.48°E	TM3780
Speybank	Highland	57.13°N 03.91°W	NH8406
Spey Bay	Moray	57.66°N 03.09°W	NJ3564
Speybridge	Highland	57.31°N 03.61°W	NJ0326
Spilsby	Lincolnshire	53.17°N 00.09°E	TF4066
Spindlestone	Northumberland	55.59°N 01.76°W	NU1533
Spinkhill	Derbyshire	53.29°N 01.32°W	SK4578
Spinney Hill	Northamptonshire	52.26°N 00.87°W	SP7763
Spinney Hills	City of Leicester	52.63°N 01.11°W	SK6004
Spinningdale	Highland	57.87°N 04.24°W	NH6789
Spion Kop	Nottinghamshire	53.18°N 01.17°W	SK5566
Spirthill	Wiltshire	51.47°N 02.01°W	ST9975
Spital	Berkshire	51.46°N 00.63°W	SU9575
Spital	Wirral	53.34°N 02.99°W	SJ3483
Spitalbrook	Hertfordshire	51.75°N 00.01°W	TL3708
Spitalfields	County of the City of London	51.51°N 00.08°W	TQ3381
Spital Hill	Doncaster	53.43°N 01.08°W	SK6193
Spitalhill	Derbyshire	53.00°N 01.73°W	SK1845
Spital-in-the-Street	Lincolnshire	53.39°N 00.55°W	SK9690
Spital Tongues	Newcastle upon Tyne	54.97°N 01.64°W	NZ2365
Spithurst	East Sussex	50.93°N 00.01°E	TQ4217
Spittal	Dumfries and Galloway	54.88°N 04.55°W	NX3657
Spittal	East Lothian	55.98°N 02.86°W	NT4677
Spittal	East Riding of Yorkshire	53.95°N 00.84°W	SE7652
Spittal	Highland	58.46°N 03.44°W	ND1654
Spittal	Northumberland	55.75°N 02.00°W	NU0051
Spittal	Pembrokeshire	51.86°N 04.95°W	SM9723
Spittal	Stirling	56.04°N 04.45°W	NS4786
Spittalfield	Perth and Kinross	56.54°N 03.46°W	NO1040
Spittal of Glenshee	Perth and Kinross	56.80°N 03.47°W	NO1069
Spittlegate	Lincolnshire	52.89°N 00.64°W	SK9134
Spixworth	Norfolk	52.68°N 01.31°E	TG2415
Splatt (Tresmeer)	Cornwall	50.66°N 04.52°W	SX2288
Splatt (St Minver Lowlands)	Cornwall	50.54°N 04.90°W	SW9476
Splatt	Devon	50.82°N 03.98°W	SS6005
Splatt	Somerset	51.12°N 03.11°W	ST2237
Splayne's Green	East Sussex	50.99°N 00.03°E	TQ4324
Splott	Cardiff	51.47°N 03.16°W	ST1976
Spofforth	North Yorkshire	53.95°N 01.45°W	SE3651
Spondon	City of Derby	52.91°N 01.40°W	SK4035
Spon End	Coventry	52.40°N 01.53°W	SP3279
Spon Green	Flintshire	53.15°N 03.07°W	SJ2863
Spooner Row	Norfolk	52.53°N 01.08°E	TM0997
Spoonleygate	Shropshire	52.56°N 02.29°W	SO8096
Sporle	Norfolk	52.66°N 00.71°E	TF8411
Spotland Bridge	Rochdale	53.61°N 02.18°W	SD8813
Spott	East Lothian	55.96°N 02.53°W	NT6775
Spratton	Northamptonshire	52.32°N 00.95°W	SP7170
Spreakley	Surrey	51.16°N 00.79°W	SU8441
Spreyton	Devon	50.74°N 03.85°W	SX6996
Spriddlestone	Devon	50.34°N 04.06°W	SX5351
Spridlington	Lincolnshire	53.34°N 00.49°W	TF0084
Sprig's Alley	Oxfordshire	51.67°N 00.90°W	SU7698
Springbank	Gloucestershire	51.90°N 02.13°W	SO9123
Spring Bank	Cumbria	54.60°N 03.20°W	NY2224
Springboig	City of Glasgow	55.85°N 04.15°W	NS6564
Springbourne	Bournemouth	50.72°N 01.85°W	SZ1092
Springburn	City of Glasgow	55.88°N 04.24°W	NS6068
Spring Cottage	Derbyshire	52.74°N 01.55°W	SK3016
Spring End	North Yorkshire	54.36°N 02.07°W	SD9597
Springfield	Birmingham	52.42°N 01.86°W	SP0981
Springfield	Caerphilly	51.64°N 03.18°W	ST1895
Springfield	Dumfries and Galloway	55.00°N 03.06°W	NY3268
Springfield	Essex	51.74°N 00.47°E	TL7108
Springfield	Fife	56.28°N 03.06°W	NO3411
Springfield	Highland	57.63°N 04.24°W	NH6663
Springfield	Milton Keynes	52.03°N 00.73°W	SP8738
Springfield	Sandwell	52.49°N 02.06°W	SO9688
Springfield	Wigan	53.54°N 02.65°W	SD5706
Springfield	Wolverhampton	52.58°N 02.13°W	SO9199
Springfields	City of Stoke-on-Trent	52.99°N 02.21°W	SJ8644
Spring Gardens	Somerset	51.23°N 02.34°W	ST7649
Spring Gdns	Shropshire	52.71°N 02.74°W	SJ5013
Spring Green	Lancashire	53.88°N 02.10°W	SD9343
Spring Grove	Hounslow	51.47°N 00.34°W	TQ1576
Springhead	Oldham	53.53°N 02.07°W	SD9504
Spring Hill	Lancashire	53.74°N 02.39°W	SD7428
Spring Hill	Oldham	53.54°N 02.09°W	SD9405
Spring Hill	Staffordshire	52.55°N 02.17°W	SO8895
Springhill	East Renfrewshire	55.78°N 04.39°W	NS5057
Springhill	Isle of Wight	50.75°N 01.29°W	SZ5095
Springhill	North Lanarkshire	55.80°N 03.78°W	NS8858
Springhill	Staffordshire	52.63°N 02.04°W	SJ9704
Springhill	Walsall	52.64°N 01.91°W	SK0605
Springkell	Dumfries and Galloway	55.06°N 03.17°W	NY2575
Spring Park	Croydon	51.36°N 00.04°W	TQ3665
Springside	North Ayrshire	55.60°N 04.58°W	NS3738
Springthorpe	Lincolnshire	53.39°N 00.69°W	SK8789
Spring Vale	Barnsley	53.52°N 01.62°W	SE2503
Spring Valley	Isle of Man	54.14°N 04.52°W	SC3575
Springwell	Essex	52.04°N 00.21°E	TL5241
Springwell	Gateshead	54.91°N 01.56°W	NZ2858
Springwell	Sunderland	54.88°N 01.44°W	NZ3655
Springwells	Dumfries and Galloway	55.20°N 03.44°W	NY0891
Sproatley	East Riding of Yorkshire	53.78°N 00.19°W	TA1934
Sproston Green	Cheshire	53.19°N 02.40°W	SJ7366
Sprotbrough	Doncaster	53.51°N 01.20°W	SE5302
Sproughton	Suffolk	52.05°N 01.09°E	TM1244
Sprouston	Scottish Borders	55.60°N 02.39°W	NT7535
Sprowston	Norfolk	52.65°N 01.31°E	TG2411
Sproxton	Leicestershire	52.80°N 00.74°W	SK8524
Sproxton	North Yorkshire	54.22°N 01.06°W	SE6181
Sprunston	Cumbria	54.82°N 02.95°W	NY3948
Spunhill	Shropshire	52.89°N 02.87°W	SJ4133
Spurlands End	Buckinghamshire	51.66°N 00.71°W	SU8997
Spur Ness	Orkney Islands	59.18°N 02.69°W	HY605336
Spurn Head	East Riding of Yorkshire	53.57°N 00.11°E	TA399107
Spurstow	Cheshire	53.09°N 02.67°W	SJ5556
Spurtree	Shropshire	52.31°N 02.58°W	SO6069
Spyway (Askerswell)	Dorset	50.73°N 02.68°W	SY5293

== Sq ==
Location	Locality	Coordinates (links to map & photo sources)	OS grid reference
Square and Compass	Pembrokeshire	51.93°N 05.12°W	SM8531
Squires Gate	Lancashire	53.78°N 03.04°W	SD3132

== Sr ==
Location	Locality	Coordinates (links to map & photo sources)	OS grid reference
Sraid Ruadh	Argyll and Bute	56.51°N 06.96°W	NL9547
Sròn Bheag	Highland	56.68°N 06.14°W	NM464620

== St ==
Note: Places named for Saints are normally listed as (e.g.) "St Chloe" and sorted as if there was no space following the St

=== Stab-Stao ===
Location	Locality	Coordinates (links to map & photo sources)	OS grid reference
St Abbs	Scottish Borders	55.89°N 02.14°W	NT9167
St Abb's Head	Scottish Borders	55.91°N 02.14°W	NT909690
Stableford	Shropshire	52.57°N 02.37°W	SO7598
Stableford	Staffordshire	52.93°N 02.28°W	SJ8138
Stac an Armin	Western Isles	57.88°N 08.49°W	NA151066
Stacey Bank	Sheffield	53.40°N 01.58°W	SK2890
Stackhouse	North Yorkshire	54.08°N 02.29°W	SD8165
Stack Islands	Western Isles	57.04°N 07.29°W	NF789073
Stack of Wirrgeo	Shetland Islands	60.34°N 00.88°W	HU614622
Stackpole	Pembrokeshire	51.62°N 04.92°W	SR9896
Stackpole Elidor or Cheriton	Pembrokeshire	51.63°N 04.92°W	SR9897
Stackpole Head	Pembrokeshire	51.61°N 04.90°W	SR992943
Stacksford	Norfolk	52.46°N 01.01°E	TM0590
Stacksteads	Lancashire	53.68°N 02.24°W	SD8421
Stackyard Green	Suffolk	52.06°N 00.85°E	TL9645
Stac Lee	Western Isles	57.86°N 08.51°W	NA141049
Staddiscombe	Devon	50.34°N 04.09°W	SX5151
Staddlethorpe	East Riding of Yorkshire	53.74°N 00.74°W	SE8328
Staddon (Hartland)	Devon	50.97°N 04.47°W	SS2622
Staddon (Holsworthy Hamlets)	Devon	50.80°N 04.34°W	SS3503
Staden	Derbyshire	53.24°N 01.89°W	SK0772
Stadhampton	Oxfordshire	51.67°N 01.13°W	SU6098
Stadhlaigearraidh	Western Isles	57.31°N 07.38°W	NF7638
Stadmorslow	Staffordshire	53.09°N 02.21°W	SJ8655
St Aethans	Moray	57.69°N 03.47°W	NJ1268
Staffa	Argyll and Bute	56.43°N 06.34°W	NM325353
Staffield	Cumbria	54.77°N 02.71°W	NY5442
Staffin Island	Highland	57.63°N 06.20°W	NG491687
Stafford	Staffordshire	52.80°N 02.12°W	SJ9223
Stafford Park	Shropshire	52.66°N 02.43°W	SJ7108
Stafford's Corner	Essex	51.80°N 00.84°E	TL9616
Stafford's Green	Dorset	50.98°N 02.52°W	ST6321
Stagbatch	Herefordshire	52.21°N 02.79°W	SO4658
Stagden Cross	Essex	51.80°N 00.36°E	TL6314
Stagehall	Scottish Borders	55.68°N 02.87°W	NT4544
St Agnes	Cornwall	50.30°N 05.20°W	SW7250
St Agnes	Isles of Scilly	49.89°N 06.34°W	SV884081
St Agnes Head	Cornwall	50.31°N 05.23°W	SW701510
Stagsden	Bedfordshire	52.13°N 00.56°W	SP9849
Stagsden West End	Bedfordshire	52.11°N 00.58°W	SP9747
Stag's Head	Devon	51.02°N 03.89°W	SS6727
Stainburn	Cumbria	54.64°N 03.52°W	NY0229
Stainburn	North Yorkshire	53.92°N 01.63°W	SE2448
Stainby	Lincolnshire	52.78°N 00.66°W	SK9022
Staincliffe	Kirklees	53.70°N 01.65°W	SE2323
Staincross	Barnsley	53.58°N 01.50°W	SE3310
Staindrop	Durham	54.57°N 01.81°W	NZ1220
Staines-upon-Thames	Surrey	51.42°N 00.50°W	TQ0471
Staines Green	Hertfordshire	51.78°N 00.13°W	TL2911
Stainfield	Lincolnshire	53.24°N 00.33°W	TF1173
Stainfield near Bourne	Lincolnshire	52.81°N 00.41°W	TF0725
Stainforth	Doncaster	53.59°N 01.03°W	SE6411
Stainforth	North Yorkshire	54.09°N 02.27°W	SD8267
Staining	Lancashire	53.81°N 03.00°W	SD3436
Stainland	Calderdale	53.66°N 01.89°W	SE0719
Stainsacre	North Yorkshire	54.45°N 00.59°W	NZ9108
Stainsby	Derbyshire	53.18°N 01.34°W	SK4465
Stainsby	Lincolnshire	53.21°N 00.01°W	TF3371
Stainton (Kingmoor)	Cumbria	54.89°N 02.98°W	NY3756
Stainton (Dacre)	Cumbria	54.64°N 02.80°W	NY4828
Stainton (south Cumbria)	Cumbria	54.25°N 02.73°W	SD5285
Stainton	Durham	54.55°N 01.90°W	NZ0618
Stainton	Middlesbrough	54.51°N 01.25°W	NZ4814
Stainton	North Yorkshire	54.35°N 01.84°W	SE1096
Stainton	Rotherham	53.43°N 01.17°W	SK5593
Stainton by Langworth	Lincolnshire	53.27°N 00.41°W	TF0677
Staintondale	North Yorkshire	54.36°N 00.47°W	SE9998
Stainton le Vale	Lincolnshire	53.43°N 00.24°W	TF1794
Stainton with Adgarley	Cumbria	54.13°N 03.16°W	SD2472
Stair	Cumbria	54.57°N 03.19°W	NY2321
Stair	South Ayrshire	55.47°N 04.48°W	NS4323
Stairfoot	Barnsley	53.54°N 01.44°W	SE3705
Stairhaven	Dumfries and Galloway	54.83°N 04.80°W	NX2053
Staithes	North Yorkshire	54.55°N 00.79°W	NZ7818
Stakeford	Northumberland	55.15°N 01.59°W	NZ2685
Stake Hill	Rochdale	53.56°N 02.16°W	SD8908
Stakenbridge	Worcestershire	52.40°N 02.17°W	SO8879
Stake Pool	Lancashire	53.928°N 02.895°W	SD4147
St Albans	Hertfordshire	51.75°N 00.33°W	TL1507
St Alban's Head	Dorset	50.57°N 02.05°W	SY962755
Stalbridge	Dorset	50.95°N 02.38°W	ST7317
Stalbridge Weston	Dorset	50.94°N 02.41°W	ST7116
St Aldhelm's Head	Dorset	50.57°N 02.05°W	SY962755
Stalham	Norfolk	52.77°N 01.51°E	TG3725
Stalham Green	Norfolk	52.76°N 01.52°E	TG3824
Stalisfield Green	Kent	51.23°N 00.79°E	TQ9552
Stalland Common	Norfolk	52.54°N 00.97°E	TM0298
Stallen	Dorset	50.94°N 02.57°W	ST6016
St Allen	Cornwall	50.30°N 05.06°W	SW8250
Stallingborough	North East Lincolnshire	53.58°N 00.18°W	TA2011
Stalling Busk	North Yorkshire	54.26°N 02.13°W	SD9185
Stallington	Staffordshire	52.94°N 02.09°W	SJ9439
Stalmine	Lancashire	53.89°N 02.96°W	SD3745
Stalmine Moss Side	Lancashire	53.89°N 02.96°W	SD3745
Stalybridge	Tameside	53.47°N 02.06°W	SJ9698
Stambermill	Dudley	52.45°N 02.13°W	SO9184
Stamborough	Somerset	51.11°N 03.40°W	ST0236
Stambourne	Essex	52.01°N 00.50°E	TL7238
Stambourne Green	Essex	52.01°N 00.47°E	TL7038
Stamford	Lincolnshire	52.65°N 00.49°W	TF0207
Stamford Bridge	Cheshire	53.19°N 02.80°W	SJ4667
Stamford Bridge	East Riding of Yorkshire	53.98°N 00.91°W	SE7155
Stamfordham	Northumberland	55.03°N 01.89°W	NZ0771
Stamford Hill	Hackney	51.56°N 00.08°W	TQ3387
Stamperland	East Renfrewshire	55.79°N 04.28°W	NS5758
Stamshaw	City of Portsmouth	50.81°N 01.09°W	SU6402
Stanah	Lancashire	53.87°N 02.99°W	SD3542
Stanborough	Hertfordshire	51.78°N 00.23°W	TL2211
Stanbridge	Bedfordshire	51.90°N 00.60°W	SP9624
Stanbridge	Dorset	50.82°N 02.00°W	SU0003
Stanbridgeford	Bedfordshire	51.89°N 00.60°W	SP9623
Stanbrook	Essex	51.93°N 00.32°E	TL6029
Stanbrook	Worcestershire	52.13°N 02.24°W	SO8349
Stanbury	Bradford	53.82°N 02.00°W	SE0037
Stand	Bury	53.54°N 02.31°W	SD7905
Stand	North Lanarkshire	55.88°N 03.98°W	NS7668
Standburn	Falkirk	55.94°N 03.73°W	NS9274
Standeford	Staffordshire	52.66°N 02.13°W	SJ9107
Standen (Biddenden)	Kent	51.12°N 00.64°E	TQ8540
Standen Hall	Lancashire	53.85°N 02.39°W	SD7440
Standen Street	Kent	51.04°N 00.56°E	TQ8030
Standerwick	Somerset	51.24°N 02.27°W	ST8150
Standford	Hampshire	51.09°N 00.84°W	SU8134
Standford Bridge	Shropshire	52.81°N 02.44°W	SJ7024
Standingstone	Cumbria	54.83°N 03.16°W	NY2549
Standish	Gloucestershire	51.77°N 02.29°W	SO8008
Standish	Wigan	53.58°N 02.66°W	SD5610
Standish Lower Ground	Wigan	53.55°N 02.68°W	SD5507
Standlake	Oxfordshire	51.72°N 01.43°W	SP3903
Standon	Hampshire	51.03°N 01.40°W	SU4226
Standon	Hertfordshire	51.87°N 00.00°E	TL3822
Standon	Staffordshire	52.90°N 02.28°W	SJ8134
Standon Green End	Hertfordshire	51.85°N 00.02°W	TL3619
St Andrews	Fife	56.33°N 02.79°W	NO5116
St. Andrews Major	The Vale Of Glamorgan	51.43°N 03.25°W	ST1371
St Andrew's Well	Dorset	50.73°N 02.75°W	SY4793
St Andrew's Wood	Devon	50.83°N 03.33°W	ST0605
Stane	North Lanarkshire	55.81°N 03.78°W	NS8859
Stanecastle	North Ayrshire	55.61°N 04.65°W	NS3339
Stanfield	Norfolk	52.74°N 00.85°E	TF9320
Stanfield	City of Stoke-on-Trent	53.05°N 02.19°W	SJ8751
Stanford	Bedfordshire	52.05°N 00.30°W	TL1641
Stanford	Kent	51.10°N 01.02°E	TR1238
Stanford	Norfolk	52.51°N 00.72°E	TL8594
Stanford	Shropshire	52.70°N 02.99°W	SJ3312
Stanford Bishop	Herefordshire	52.15°N 02.46°W	SO6851
Stanford Bridge	Worcestershire	52.28°N 02.42°W	SO7165
Stanford Dingley	Berkshire	51.43°N 01.18°W	SU5771
Stanford End	Hampshire	51.36°N 00.99°W	SU7063
Stanford Hills	Nottinghamshire	52.80°N 01.20°W	SK5423
Stanford in the Vale	Oxfordshire	51.63°N 01.51°W	SU3493
Stanford-le-Hope	Essex	51.51°N 00.41°E	TQ6882
Stanford-on-Avon	Northamptonshire	52.39°N 01.14°W	SP5878
Stanford on Soar	Nottinghamshire	52.79°N 01.20°W	SK5422
Stanford on Teme	Worcestershire	52.28°N 02.44°W	SO7065
Stanford Rivers	Essex	51.68°N 00.21°E	TL5301
Stanfree	Derbyshire	53.26°N 01.29°W	SK4774
Stanger Head	Orkney Islands	59.26°N 02.86°W	HY509427
Stanghow	North Yorkshire	54.53°N 00.96°W	NZ6715
Stanground	Cambridgeshire	52.54°N 00.23°W	TL2096
Stanhill	Lancashire	53.73°N 02.42°W	SD7227
Stanhoe	Norfolk	52.90°N 00.67°E	TF8037
Stanhope	Durham	54.74°N 02.01°W	NY9939
Stanhope	Kent	51.12°N 00.84°E	TQ9940
Stanhope	Scottish Borders	55.54°N 03.39°W	NT1229
Stanion	Northamptonshire	52.46°N 00.66°W	SP9186
Stank	Cumbria	54.12°N 03.17°W	SD2370
Stanklyn	Worcestershire	52.36°N 02.22°W	SO8574
Stanks	Leeds	53.81°N 01.45°W	SE3635
Stanley	Derbyshire	52.95°N 01.39°W	SK4140
Stanley	Durham	54.86°N 01.70°W	NZ1952
Stanley	Perth and Kinross	56.48°N 03.46°W	NO1033
Stanley	Staffordshire	53.06°N 02.10°W	SJ9352
Stanley	Wakefield	53.71°N 01.48°W	SE3424
Stanley	Wiltshire	51.44°N 02.05°W	ST9672
Stanley Common	Derbyshire	52.97°N 01.39°W	SK4142
Stanley Crook	Durham	54.73°N 01.75°W	NZ1638
Stanley Downton	Gloucestershire	51.73°N 02.29°W	SO8004
Stanley Ferry	Wakefield	53.70°N 01.47°W	SE3523
Stanley Gate	Lancashire	53.53°N 02.86°W	SD4305
Stanley Green	Cheshire	53.35°N 02.22°W	SJ8584
Stanley Green	Poole	50.72°N 01.98°W	SZ0192
Stanley Green	Shropshire	52.91°N 02.71°W	SJ5235
Stanley Hill	Herefordshire	52.09°N 02.48°W	SO6744
Stanley Moor	Staffordshire	53.05°N 02.12°W	SJ9251
Stanley Pontlarge	Gloucestershire	51.96°N 02.01°W	SO9930
Stanleytown	Rhondda, Cynon, Taff	51.63°N 03.43°W	ST0194
Stanlow	Cheshire	53.26°N 02.85°W	SJ4375
Stanlow	Shropshire	52.58°N 02.31°W	SO7999
Stanmer	Brighton and Hove	50.86°N 00.11°W	TQ3309
Stanmore	Berkshire	51.50°N 01.32°W	SU4779
Stanmore	Hampshire	51.04°N 01.34°W	SU4628
Stanmore	Harrow	51.60°N 00.32°W	TQ1691
Stanmore	Shropshire	52.52°N 02.38°W	SO7492
Stanner	Powys	52.21°N 03.08°W	SO2658
Stannergate	City of Dundee	56.45°N 02.92°W	NO4330
Stannersburn	Northumberland	55.16°N 02.44°W	NY7286
Stanners Hill	Surrey	51.35°N 00.57°W	SU9963
St Annes	Lancashire	53.74°N 03.04°W	SD3128
St Anne's Park	City of Bristol	51.44°N 02.54°W	ST6272
Stanningfield	Suffolk	52.17°N 00.74°E	TL8856
Stanningley	Leeds	53.80°N 01.66°W	SE2234
Stannington	Northumberland	55.10°N 01.67°W	NZ2179
Stannington	Sheffield	53.38°N 01.55°W	SK3088
St Ann's	Dumfries and Galloway	55.22°N 03.46°W	NY0793
St Ann's	Nottinghamshire	52.95°N 01.15°W	SK5740
St Ann's Chapel	Cornwall	50.51°N 04.24°W	SX4171
St Ann's Chapel	Devon	50.30°N 03.88°W	SX6647
St Ann's Head	Pembrokeshire	51.68°N 05.17°W	SM807036
Stanpit	Dorset	50.72°N 01.76°W	SZ1792
Stansbatch	Herefordshire	52.24°N 02.96°W	SO3461
Stansfield	Suffolk	52.13°N 00.59°E	TL7852
Stanshope	Staffordshire	53.08°N 01.82°W	SK1254
Stanstead	Kent	51.33°N 00.29°E	TQ6062
Stanstead	Suffolk	52.10°N 00.68°E	TL8449
Stanstead Abbotts	Hertfordshire	51.78°N 00.01°E	TL3911
Stansted Mountfitchet	Essex	51.89°N 00.19°E	TL5124
St Anthony	Cornwall	50.14°N 05.01°W	SW8532
St Anthony-in-Meneage	Cornwall	50.08°N 05.10°W	SW7825
St Anthony's	Gateshead	54.96°N 01.56°W	NZ2863
Stanton	Gloucestershire	52.00°N 01.91°W	SP0634
Stanton	Monmouthshire	51.88°N 03.00°W	SO3121
Stanton	Northumberland	55.19°N 01.79°W	NZ1389
Stanton	Staffordshire	53.01°N 01.82°W	SK1246
Stanton	Suffolk	52.32°N 00.87°E	TL9673
Stantonbury	Milton Keynes	52.06°N 00.77°W	SP8441
Stanton by Bridge	Derbyshire	52.83°N 01.46°W	SK3627
Stanton-by-Dale	Derbyshire	52.93°N 01.31°W	SK4638
Stanton Chare	Suffolk	52.32°N 00.86°E	TL9574
Stanton Drew	Bath and North East Somerset	51.36°N 02.59°W	ST5963
Stanton Fitzwarren	Swindon	51.60°N 01.75°W	SU1790
Stanton Gate	Derbyshire	52.93°N 01.28°W	SK4838
Stanton Harcourt	Oxfordshire	51.74°N 01.40°W	SP4105
Stanton Hill	Nottinghamshire	53.13°N 01.28°W	SK4860
Stanton in Peak	Derbyshire	53.17°N 01.64°W	SK2464
Stanton Lacy	Shropshire	52.39°N 02.75°W	SO4978
Stanton Lees	Derbyshire	53.16°N 01.62°W	SK2563
Stanton Long	Shropshire	52.50°N 02.63°W	SO5790
Stanton-on-the-Wolds	Nottinghamshire	52.86°N 01.06°W	SK6330
Stanton Prior	Bath and North East Somerset	51.35°N 02.47°W	ST6762
Stanton St Bernard	Wiltshire	51.35°N 01.87°W	SU0962
Stanton St John	Oxfordshire	51.77°N 01.17°W	SP5709
Stanton St Quintin	Wiltshire	51.51°N 02.14°W	ST9079
Stanton Street	Suffolk	52.25°N 00.85°E	TL9566
Stanton under Bardon	Leicestershire	52.68°N 01.32°W	SK4610
Stanton upon Hine Heath	Shropshire	52.81°N 02.65°W	SJ5624
Stanton Wick	Bath and North East Somerset	51.35°N 02.56°W	ST6162
Stantway	Gloucestershire	51.81°N 02.40°W	SO7213
Stanwardine in the Fields	Shropshire	52.81°N 02.87°W	SJ4124
Stanwardine in the Wood	Shropshire	52.83°N 02.86°W	SJ4227
Stanway	Essex	51.88°N 00.83°E	TL9524
Stanway	Gloucestershire	51.98°N 01.91°W	SP0632
Stanway Green	Essex	51.87°N 00.84°E	TL9623
Stanway Green	Suffolk	52.28°N 01.28°E	TM2470
Stanwell	Surrey	51.44°N 00.49°W	TQ0573
Stanwell Moor	Surrey	51.45°N 00.50°W	TQ0474
Stanwick	Northamptonshire	52.32°N 00.57°W	SP9771
Stanwick St John	North Yorkshire	54.50°N 01.71°W	NZ1811
Stanwix	Cumbria	54.90°N 02.95°W	NY3957
Stanycliffe	Rochdale	53.55°N 02.18°W	SD8807
Stanydale	Shetland Islands	60.23°N 01.49°W	HU2850
Staoinebrig	Western Isles	57.27°N 07.41°W	NF7433
