= Springwell, Sunderland =

Suburb of Sunderland, England

Coordinates: 54.8889°N 1.4234°W

Springwell
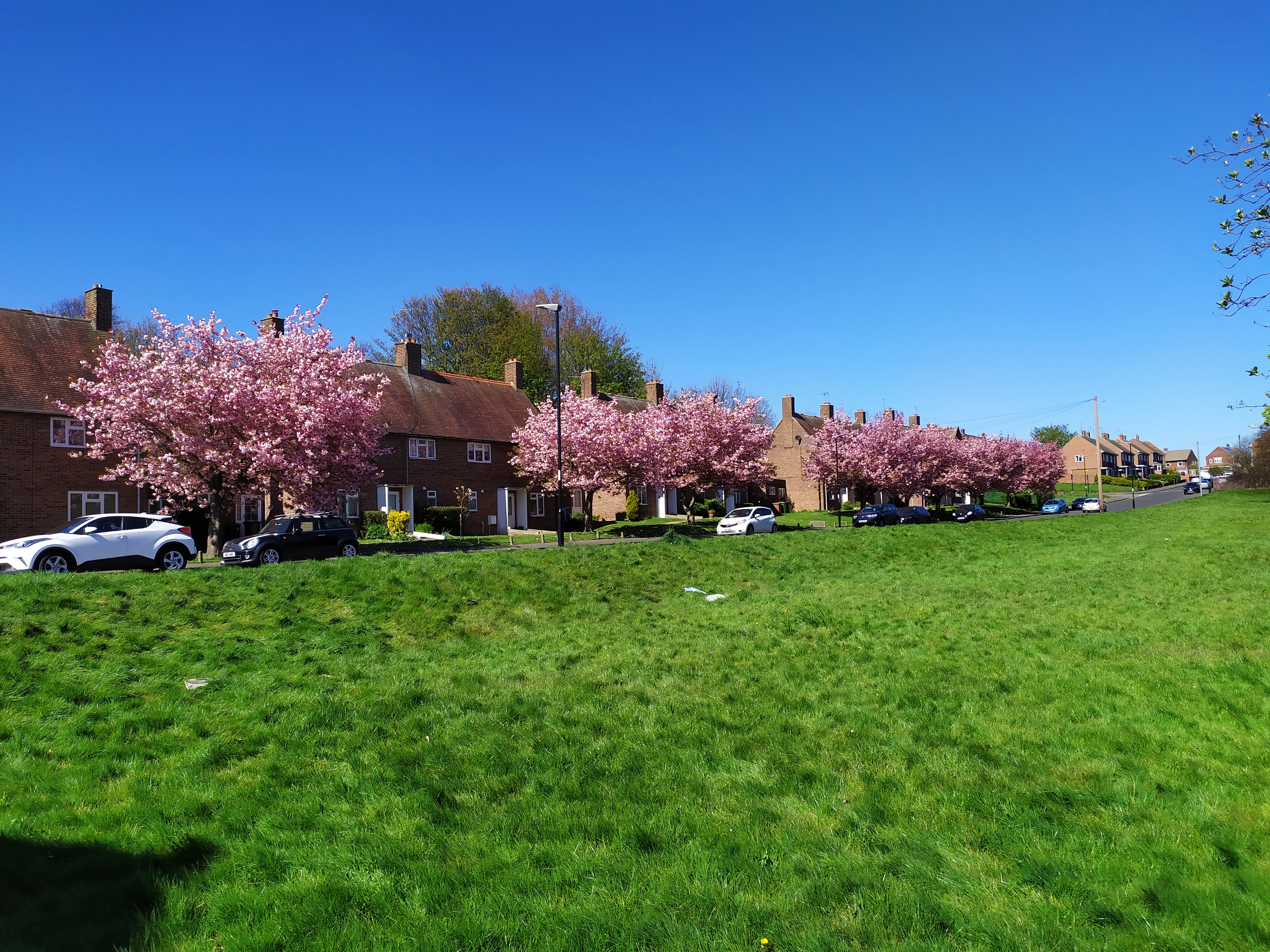
- Springwell in April 2020

- Location within Tyne and Wear
- Population: 2,008
- Metropolitan borough: City of Sunderland
- Metropolitan county: Tyne and Wear
- Region: North East
- Country: England
- Sovereign state: United Kingdom
- Post town: SUNDERLAND
- Postcode district: SR3
- Dialling code: 0191
- Police: Northumbria
- Fire: Tyne and Wear
- Ambulance: North East
- UK Parliament: Houghton and Sunderland South

Springwell is a suburb of the city of Sunderland. Not to be confused with the village of the same name in the city's far west, Springwell is 2 miles from the city centre to the area's southwest. The suburb borders Thorney Close, The Barnes and Plains Farm. Built in the 1940s, Springwell originated as one of a series of post-war council housing estates in the area.

== History ==
Originally known as "Springwell Farm Estate", Springwell was the first post-war housing estate to be created in Sunderland, being completed on May 25, 1946.
