= Seaburn Dene =

Coordinates: 54.9350°N 1.3885°W

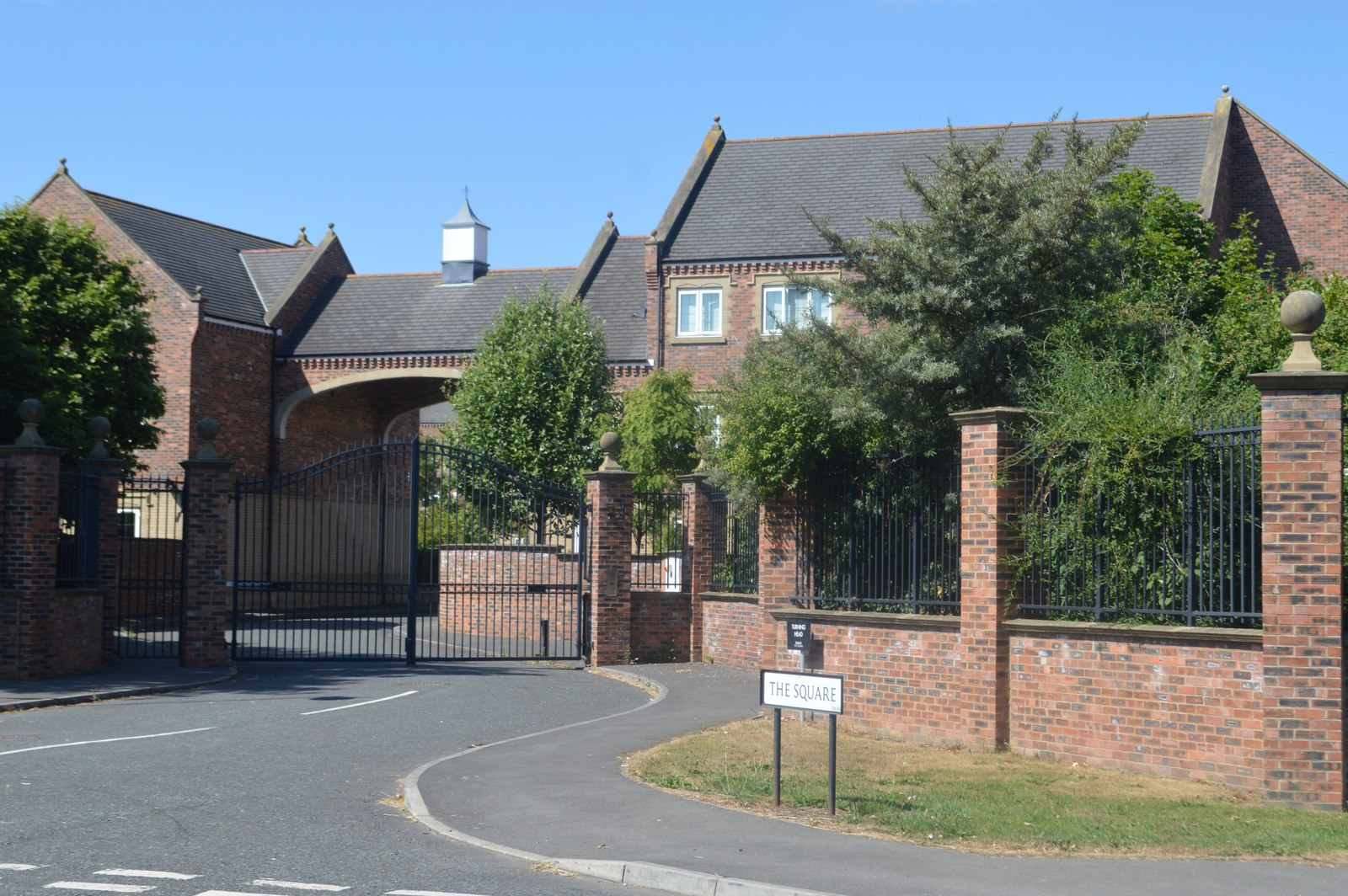
- The Square, Seaburn Dene

- Location within Tyne and Wear
- Population: 4,000
- Metropolitan borough: City of Sunderland
- Metropolitan county: Tyne and Wear
- Region: North East
- Country: England
- Sovereign state: United Kingdom
- Post town: SUNDERLAND
- Postcode district: SR6
- Police: Northumbria
- Fire: Tyne and Wear
- Ambulance: North East
- UK Parliament: Sunderland Central

Seaburn Dene is a northern suburb of Sunderland, England, located about one mile inland from the North Sea, near the boundary with South Tyneside.

The first part of the development (Shields Road) was laid out just before the Second World War, but building resumed in the 1950s. The oldest houses in Seaburn Dene are those in the bottom half of Shields Road spreading into Grizedale and Staveley. The majority of housing was completed by 1958 with later developments in Dovedale Road and Torver Crescent completed in 1962. The names of the local streets recall villages and valleys in the Lake District of Cumbria and Peak District of Derbyshire. Examples of this include Staveley Road, Martindale Avenue, Alston Crescent, and Dovedale Road - the main road through the area.

Recent expansions to the estate include The Square development on Shields Road, on the western edge of the estate. These executive homes are amongst the most expensive ever built in Sunderland, with some selling for £750,000.

Amenities on the estate include two churches, a newsagent, an off-licence, a takeaway, a sandwich shop, a beauty salon, a glass-blower and a dental surgery. Educational facilities include a lower school, Seaburn Dene Primary, and the main secondary school for north-eastern Sunderland, Monkwearmouth Academy. Both schools are on Torver Crescent. Public transport links include the 23 Stagecoach bus service to Thorney Close via Fulwell Road, Sunderland City Centre, Sunderland Royal Hospital and Thornholme Road. The last number 23 leaves the estate at 2240. From early 2009, the route is served by wheelchair accessible buses. Seaburn Dene is also bypassed by the 20, 20A and X20Go North East bus services at Shields Road, running from South Shields to Durham via Sunderland, Park Lane Interchange, Houghton-le-Spring and Belmont.

Seaburn Metro station, on the Green line of the Tyne and Wear Metro system, is a short walk to the southwest.

The area lies in the Fulwell ward on Sunderland City Council, and is currently represented by three Conservative Party councillors.
