= Dalton Old Pump House =

Building in County Durham, England

Coordinates: 54.8155°N 1.3623°W

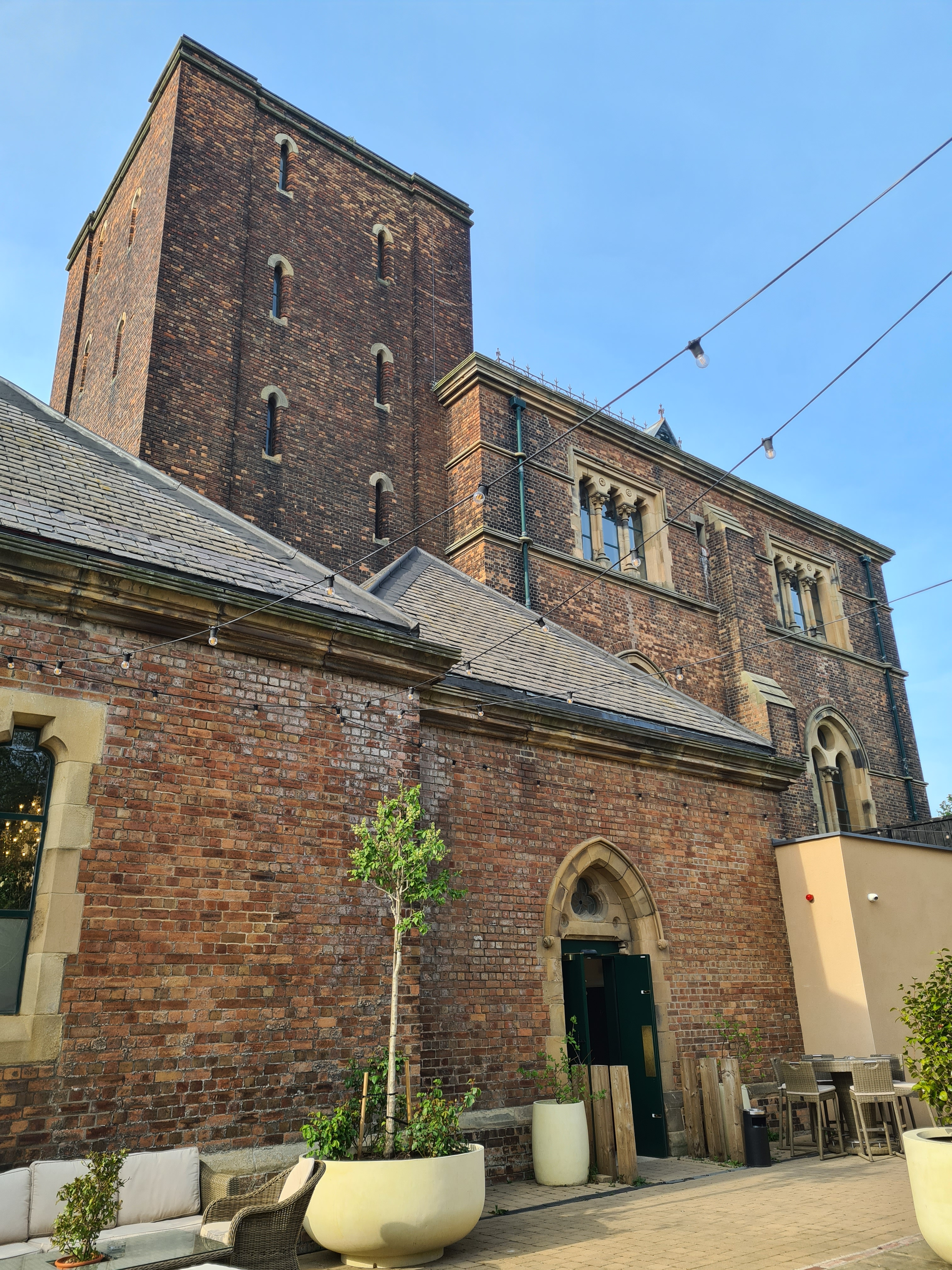
Dalton Old Pump House (viewed from the Terrace on the south side).

Dalton Old Pump House, formerly Dalton Pumping Station, is a Victorian former pumping station at Cold Hesledon, near Dalton-le-Dale in County Durham in England. It used to provide drinking water for Sunderland and the surrounding district and now functions as a wedding venue.

Built in the Venetian Gothic Revival style, it is a grade II* listed building. Inside, a pair of beam engines (dating from 1873-79, when the complex was built) remain preserved in place, though they are no longer operational.

== Pumping station ==
Dalton Pumping Station was a large, water pumping station, designed by Thomas Hawksley for the Sunderland and South Shields Water Company. It was one of five pumping stations which had been designed by Hawksley for the same company (the others being at Humbledon, Fulwell, Cleadon, and Ryhope).

The main complex at Dalton, laid out on an east-west axis, consisted of an engine house, chimney tower, boiler room and coal store. Flanking the tower to the north and south were a pair of smaller rooms (which functioned as a smithy and a storeroom respectively). Enclosing the flue within the tower was a staircase, which (as well as leading to the gallery at the top of the tower) provided access to the engines at four different levels, as well as to the other adjacent rooms.

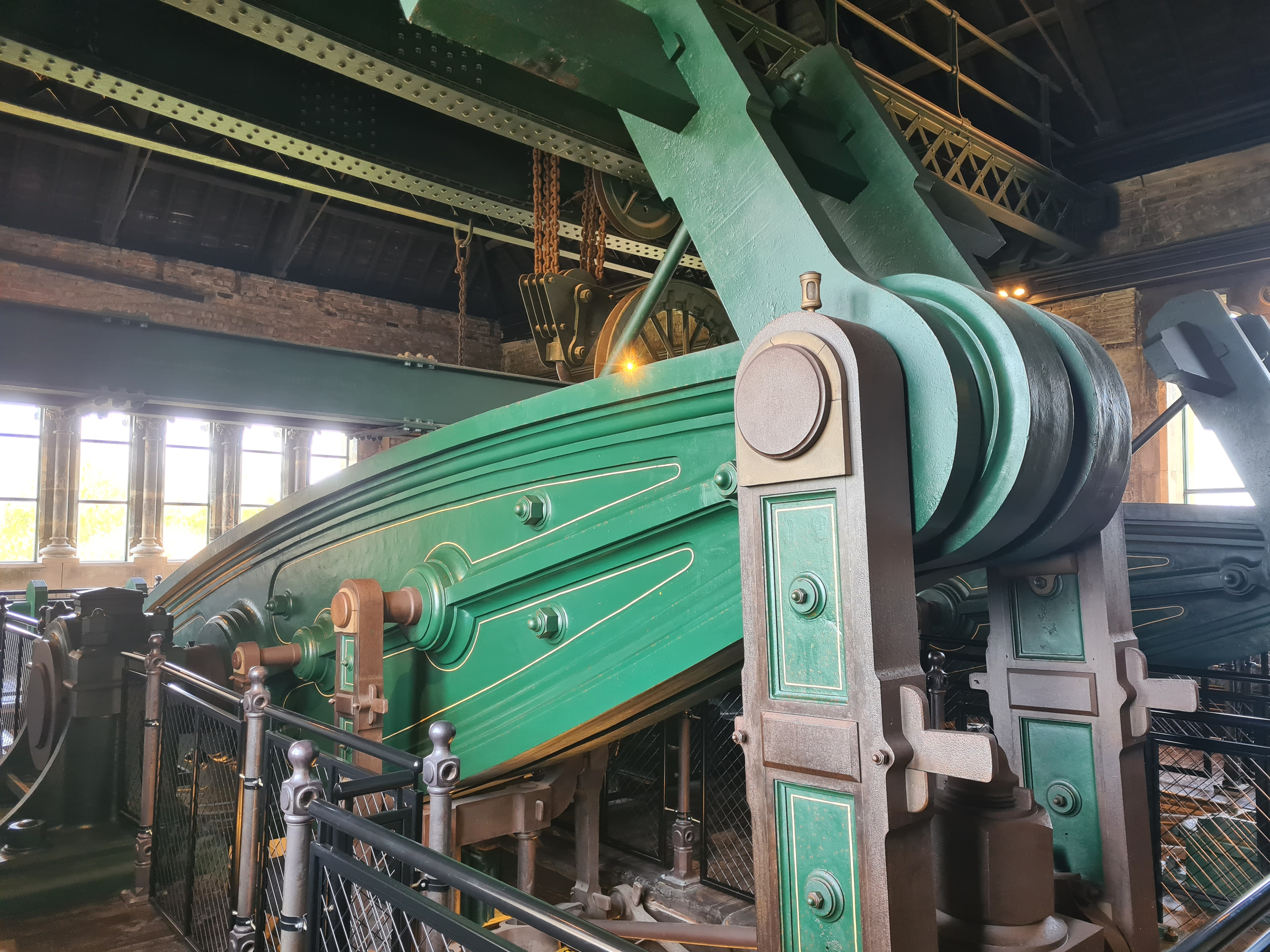
The beam of one of the old engines (each beam is 35 ft long from end to end).

The engine house was equipped with a pair of 72" single-acting non-rotative Cornish engines by Davy Brothers of Sheffield. Pumping engines of this period were more often of a double-acting rotative design (as can still be seen at nearby Ryhope); the use of Cornish engines here seems to have been due to the great depth of the well - some 450 feet. The engines at Dalton were unique, being the only Cornish engines ever designed to use superheated steam.

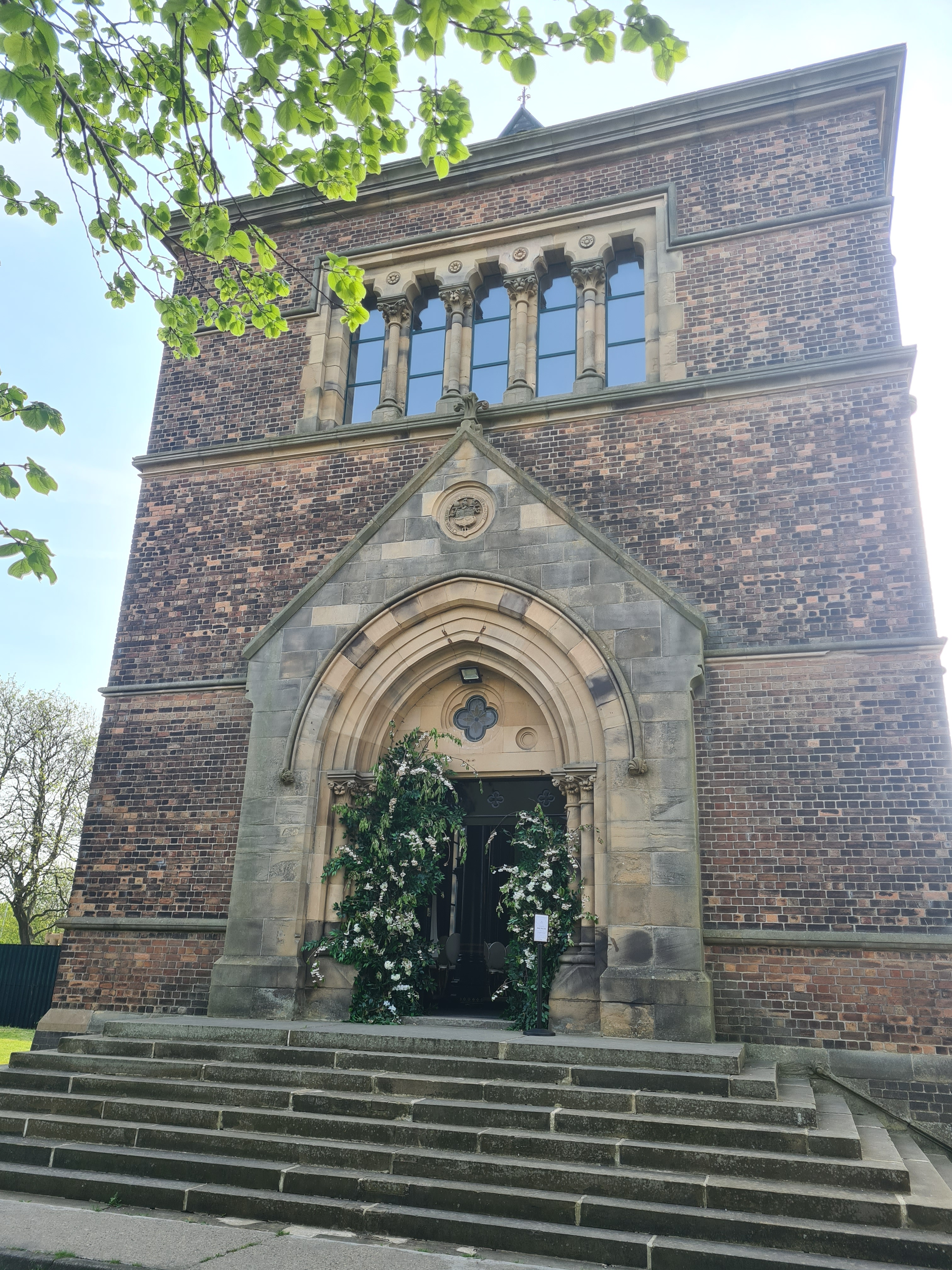
Entrance to the engine house.

The boiler room originally contained eight boilers (though by the 1920s a new arrangement of four boilers was in use). To the rear of the boilers was the coal store, which was separated from the boiler room by four tall arched doorways. Just across the road, to the west of the coal store, was a colliery which conveniently supplied the coal.

The pumping station was set within ornamental grounds: to the east, facing the engine house, were three cooling ponds laid out symmetrically (with a fountain in the central pool); while to the north was a 4,000,000 gallon capacity service reservoir. Housing for the company's employees was also provided on site, including a house for the superintendent to the south and a pair of houses and cottages to the north. The lodge by the entrance gate, which housed the foreman, is separately listed (grade II).

=== Closure ===
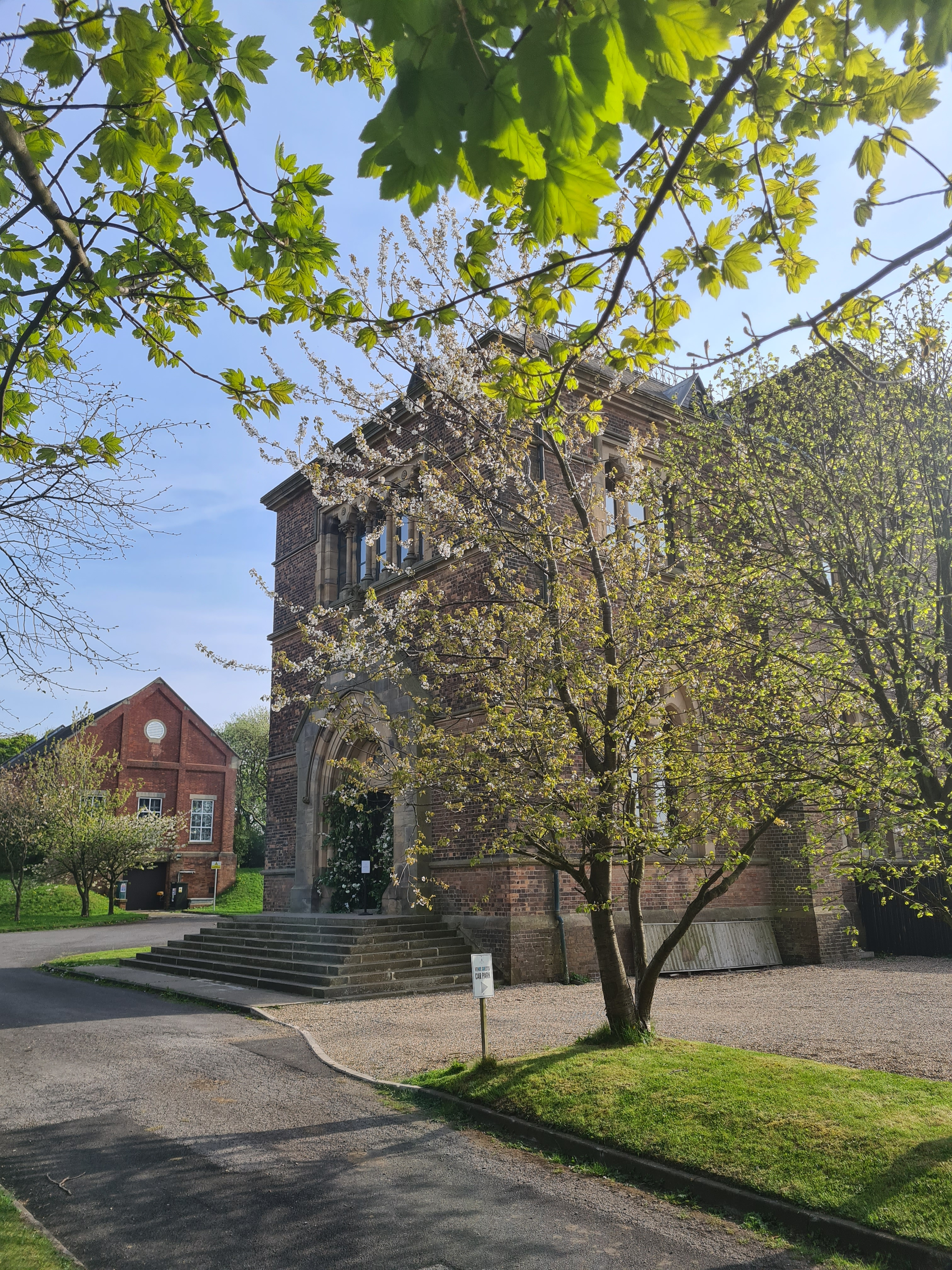
The old pumping station (right) and its successor (left).

The site suffered for many years from subsidence due to nearby mine workings; this in part led to the engines being decommissioned in the 1940s, and to the demolition in the 1960s of the striking campanile-like top section of the central tower/chimney. Before the start of the Second World War a new pump house had been built within the grounds, just south of the Victorian building, and equipped with a modern set of pumps; which continued to operate after the old engines had been decommissioned.

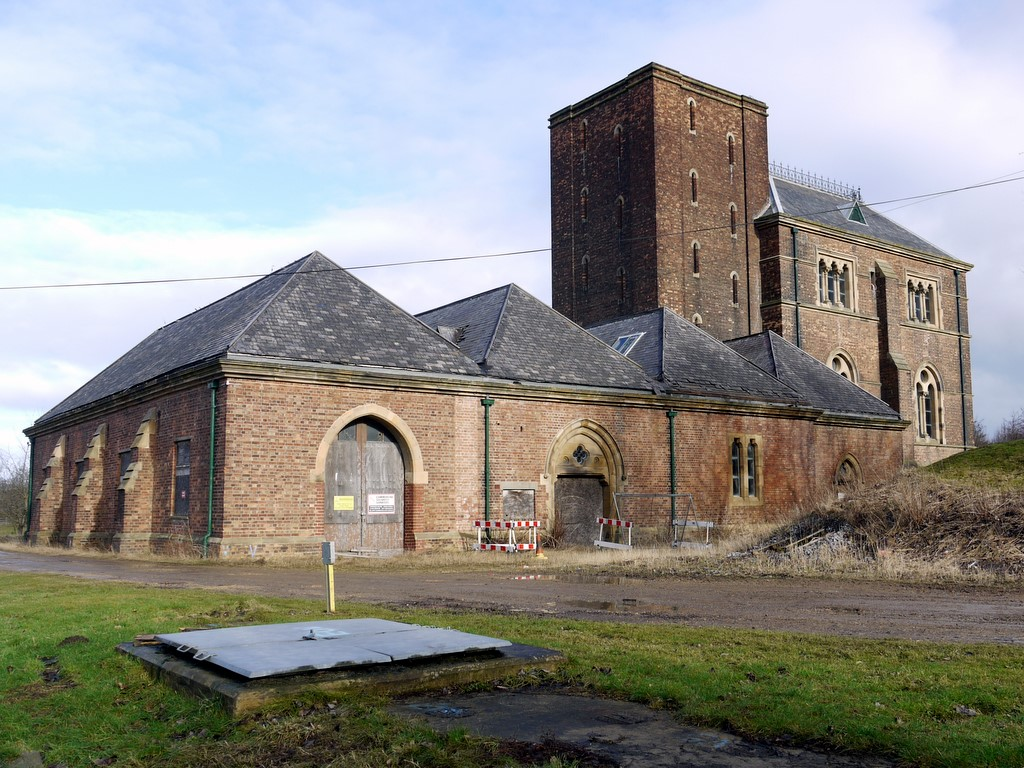
The site in 2010: (left-right) coal store, boiler room, chimney tower, engine house.

With the beam engines no longer in use, the old boilers were removed and afterwards the boiler room and coal store were used for light engineering. The building was first listed (Grade II) in 1983. In 1991 listed building consent was sought for the demolition of the pumping station, which was refused due to its historic significance. The pumping station site was bought in 1995 with a view by its owners to transform it into a pub; the following year, however, the building became Grade II* listed, which (allegedly) prevented this development.

It subsequently remained empty and unused for over twenty years, while applications were made to convert the property into apartments.

== Present day ==
In 2020, with the buildings under new ownership Vikki McCarthy-Wright and Ian Wright, planning permission was granted for its conversion into a wedding venue, bride shop and commercial offices. As part of the conversion a lift was installed within the former chimney flue inside the tower. At the same time, an open well area in the Engine Hall was covered over (it formerly gave access to the engine bed floor, from where the pump rods descended into the boreholes)

In 2022, the refurbished premises opened for business. Wedding ceremonies are conducted in the Engine Room, the Boiler Room is used for wedding receptions and other events, and the former coal store contains offices.

=== Gallery ===
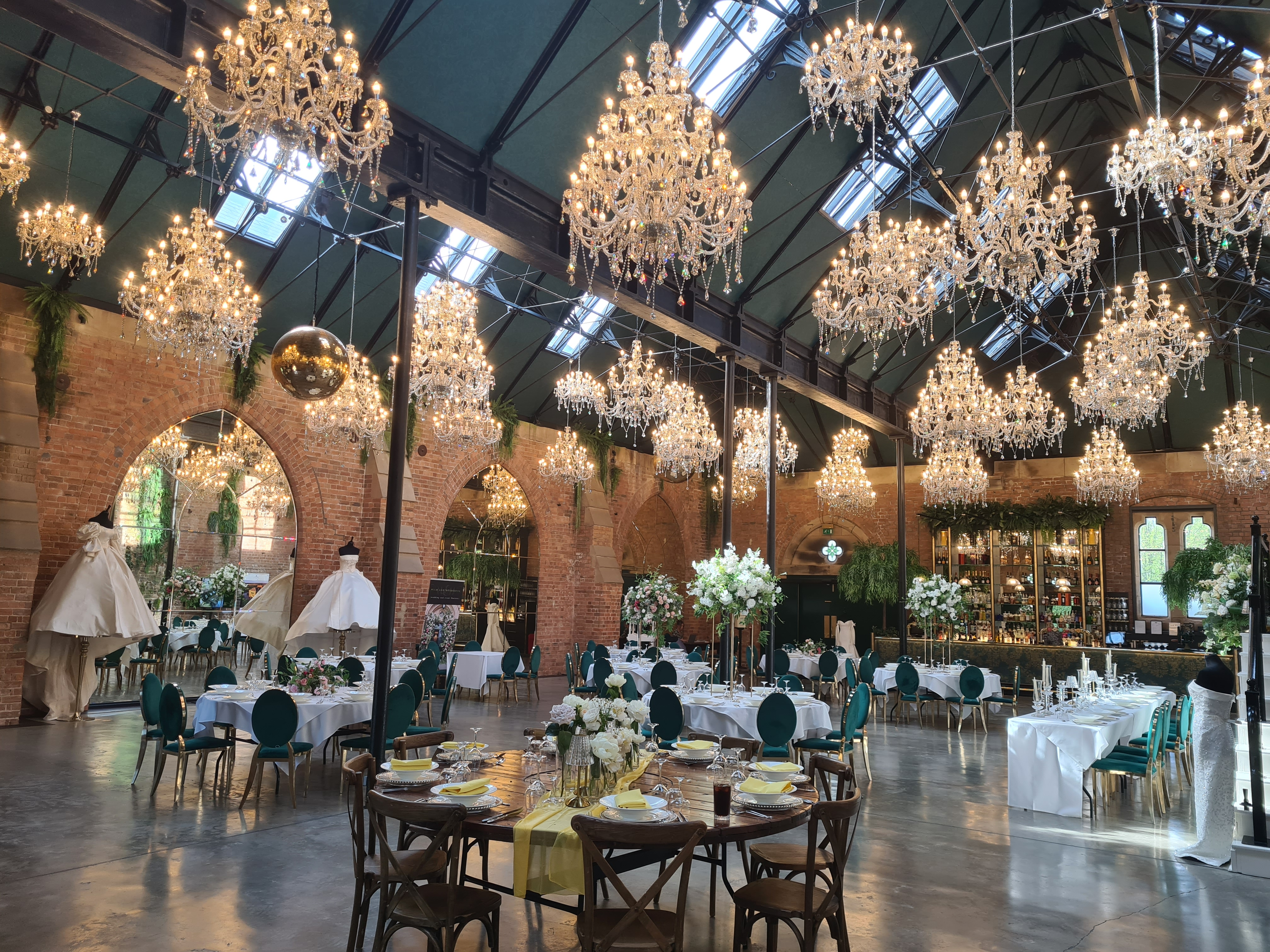
The former boiler room

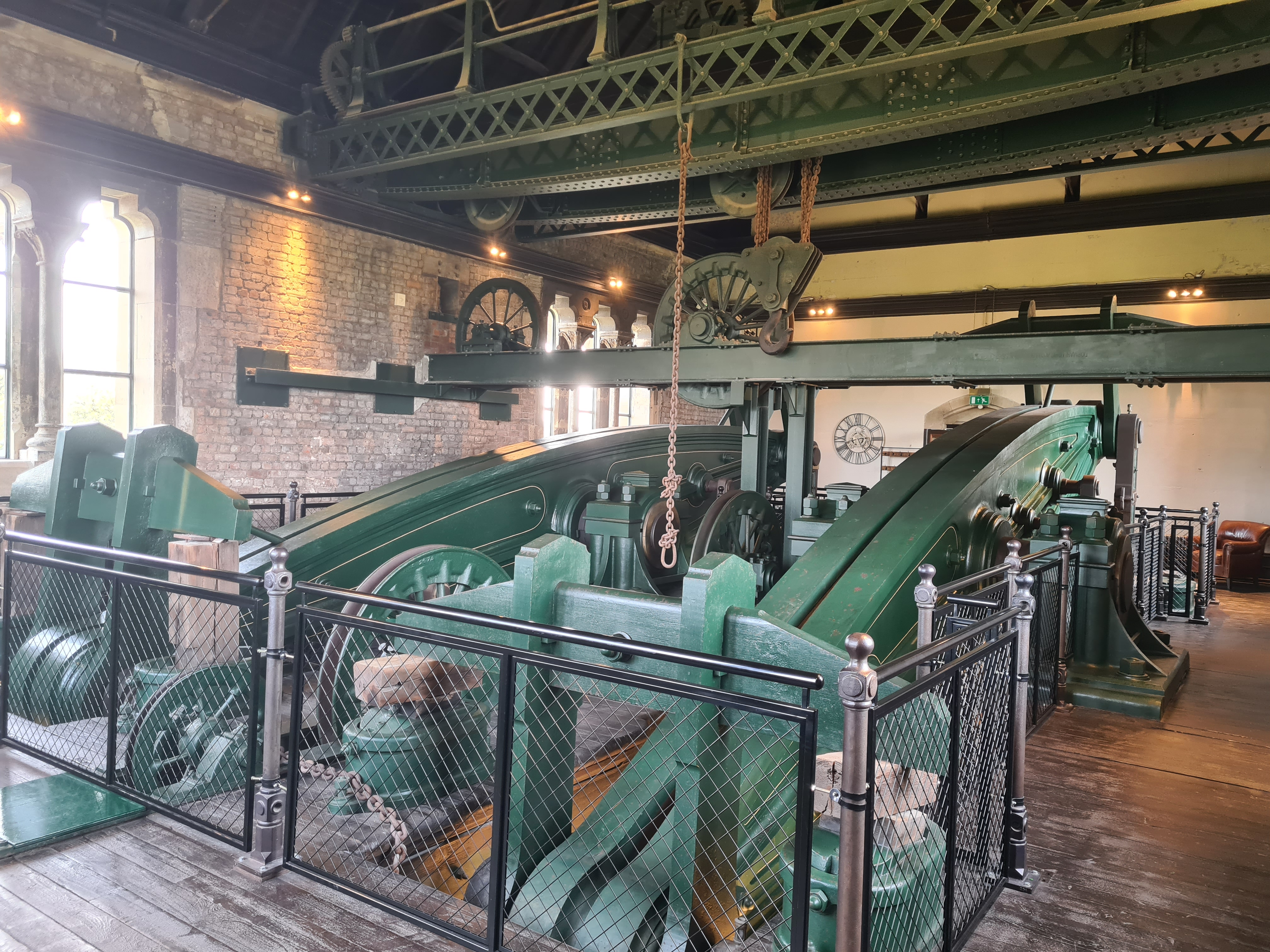
The engine house, upper floor (with twin beams and a Dorman Long & Co gantry crane)

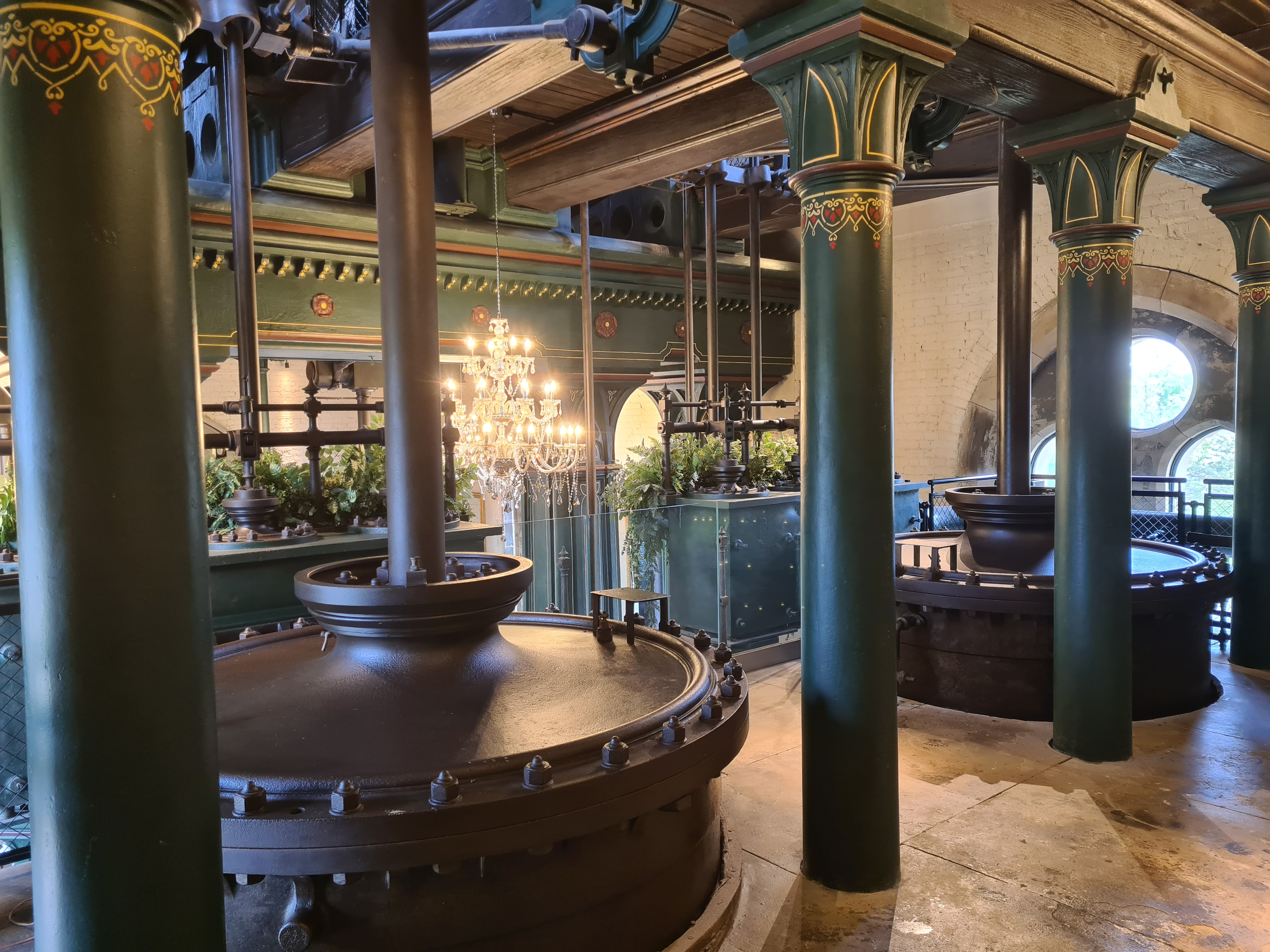
The engine house, mezzanine floor (with twin cylinder heads)

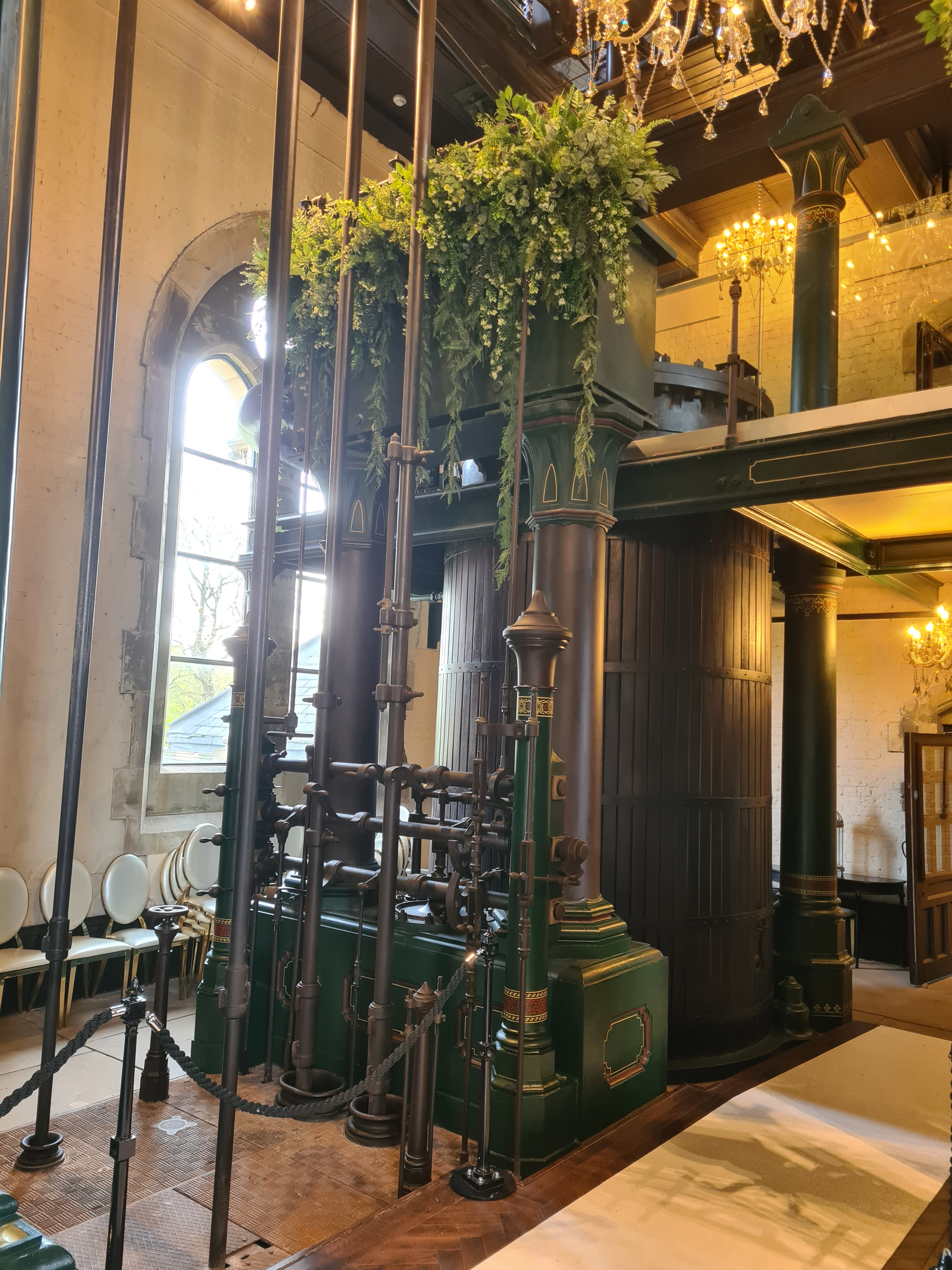
The engine house, lower floor (the South engine's valve gear and cylinder)

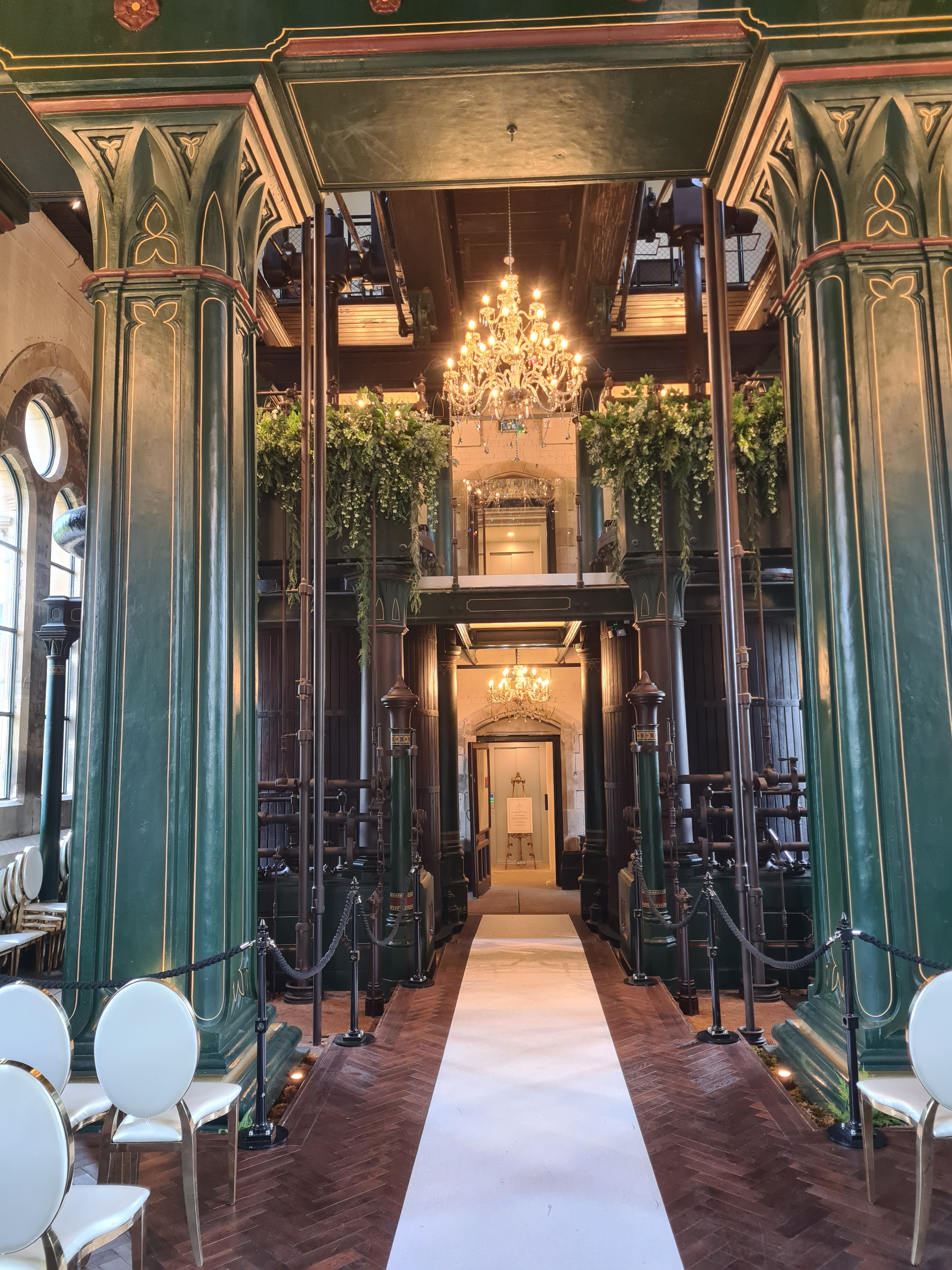
The engine house, lower floor (the view from the main entrance)

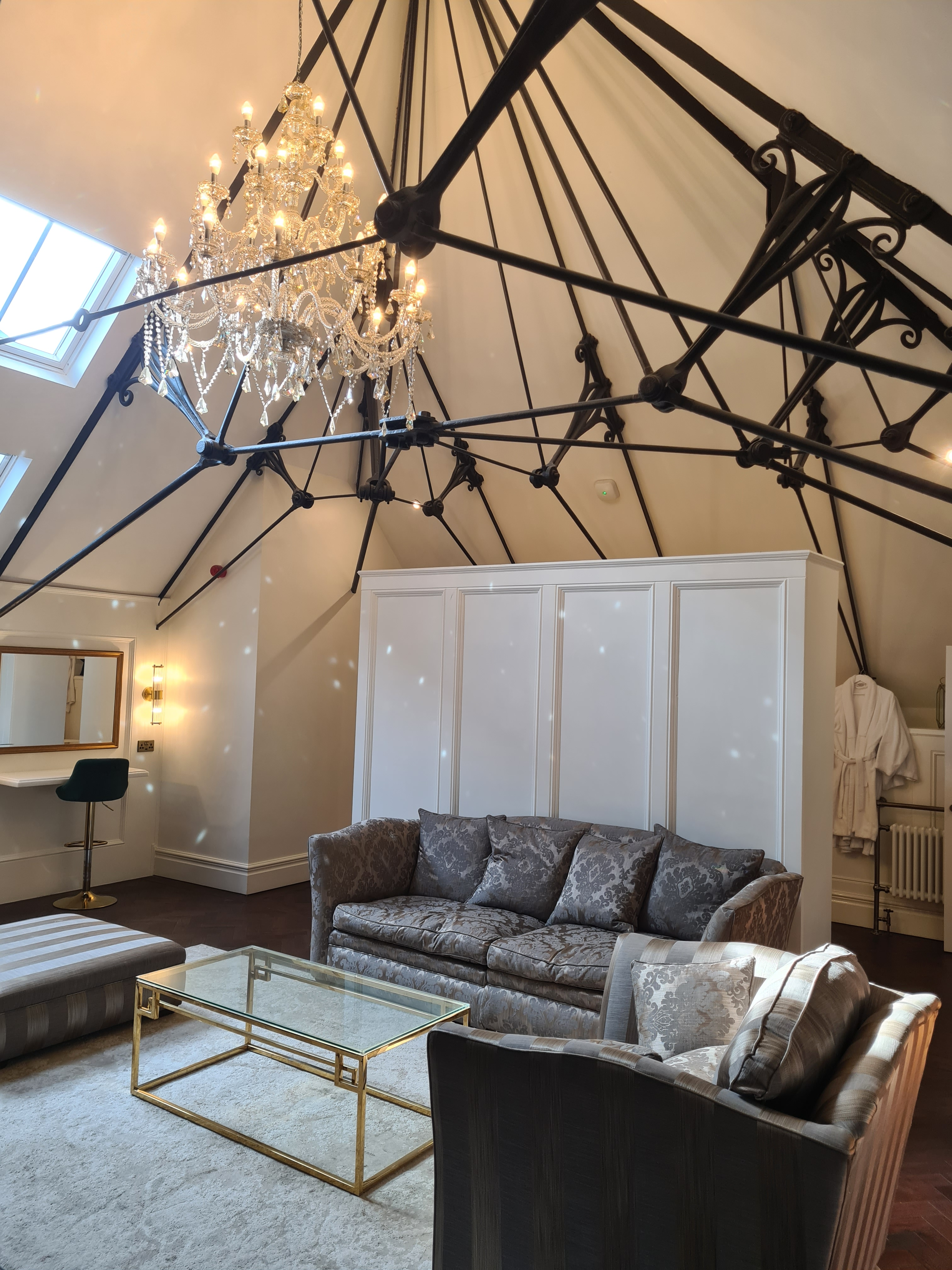
'Bridal Suite' in the roof space of what was once a blacksmith's shop

=== Northumbrian Water ===
The new (i.e. 20th-century) pump house continues to operate as a groundwater station, run by Northumbrian Water (one of eight such facilities in the wider Sunderland area). Its equipment was upgraded between 2016 and 2020.

Northumbrian Water also operates a separate groundwater station at nearby North Dalton. Opened in 1912, North Dalton Pumping Station was initially equipped with a pair of horizontal non-rotative compound steam engines by Hathorn Davey of Leeds, which remained in use until the late 1960s, whereupon the station was automated and they were replaced with a set of four electric submersible pumps.

== See also ==
- Ryhope Engines Museum
