= Springwell =

Springwell or Springwells may refer to:

== England ==
- Springwell, Sunderland, a suburb of Sunderland, Tyne and Wear
- Springwell Community College, a secondary school in Chesterfield, Derbyshire
- Springwell Estate, a council estate in Tyne and Wear
- Springwell Pit disaster, an 1872 mining disaster in Shropshire
- Springwell Village, Tyne and Wear

== Scotland ==
- Springwells, a neighbourhood of Blantyre, South Lanarkshire

== United States ==
- Springwell Danish Cemetery, North Omaha, Nebraska
- Springwells Township, Michigan, a defunct township in Wayne County
- Springwells, Detroit, a neighborhood in Detroit, Michigan
- Treaty of Springwells, an 1815 treaty between the United States and various Native American groups
- West Vernor-Springwells Historic District, a commercial district in Detroit, Michigan
