= Hastings Hill =

Coordinates: 54.88797°N 1.452°W

- Location within Tyne and Wear
- OS grid reference: NZ350549
- Metropolitan borough: City of Sunderland
- Metropolitan county: Tyne and Wear
- Region: North East
- Country: England
- Sovereign state: United Kingdom
- Post town: SUNDERLAND
- Postcode district: SR4
- Dialling code: 0191
- Police: Northumbria
- Fire: Tyne and Wear
- Ambulance: North East
- UK Parliament: Sunderland South

Hastings Hill is a suburb of Sunderland, Tyne and Wear, England.

Hastings Hill is a housing estate, close to the A19, and the Pennywell and Grindon areas of Sunderland. It was built as a private development in the late 1960s on an area of land between the county borough boundary and the surrounding post war council-built estates. The estate stands close to Hasting Hill, where a burial ground used by prehistoric man in about 2,000BC was excavated in 1911. Several cists were discovered during the excavation, with one containing the remains of a man, a flint knife and an earthenware food vessel.
