= Cold Hesledon =

Village in County Durham, England

Coordinates: 54°49′1″N 1°21′50″W

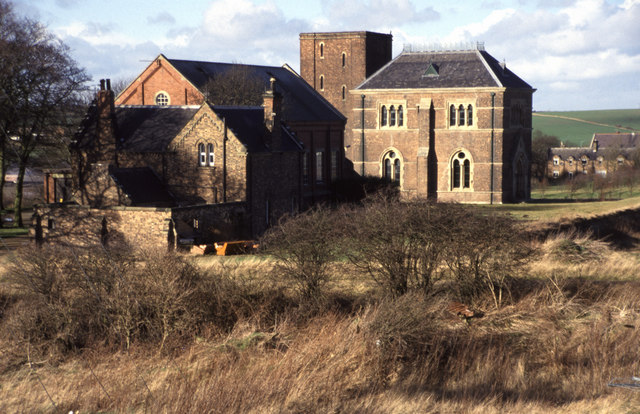
- Dalton Pumping Station

- Location within County Durham
- Civil parish: Murton; Dalton-le-Dale
- Unitary authority: County Durham
- Ceremonial county: Durham
- Region: North East
- Country: England
- Sovereign state: United Kingdom
- Post town: SEAHAM
- Postcode district: SR7
- Dialling code: 0191

Cold Hesledon is a village and former civil parish, now in the parishes of Murton and Dalton-le-Dale, in the County Durham district, in the ceremonial county of Durham, England. It is situated a short distance to the east of Murton. In 1961 the parish had a population of 997.

== Dalton Old Pump House ==
Within the village is a large Victorian, Gothic Revival former Water pumping station, designed by Thomas Hawksley for the Sunderland and South Shields Water Company. The engine house contains a pair of 72" single-acting non-rotative Cornish beam engines by Davy Bros of Sheffield, dating from the 1870s when the complex was built.

In 2020 planning permission was granted for its conversion into a wedding venue, bride shop and commercial offices, and in 2022 Dalton Old Pump House opened for business. The twin engines and surviving buildings have been preserved and restored: wedding ceremonies are conducted in the Engine Room, the Boiler Room is used for wedding receptions and other events, and the former coal store contains offices."The Venue". Dalton Old Pump House.

== Other notable landmarks ==
Nearby is Dalden Tower, a ruined tower house.

== Civil parish ==
Cold Hesledon was formerly a township in the parish of Dalton-le-Dale, from 1866 Cold Hesledon was a civil parish in its own right, on 1 April 1983 the parish was abolished and merged with Dalton-le-Dale, Hawthorn and Murton.
