= Hylton Red House =

Area of Sunderland, England

Coordinates: 54.925°N 1.42499°W

- Location within Tyne and Wear
- Population: 14,000
- Metropolitan borough: City of Sunderland
- Metropolitan county: Tyne and Wear
- Region: North East
- Country: England
- Sovereign state: United Kingdom
- Post town: SUNDERLAND
- Postcode district: SR5
- Dialling code: 0191
- Police: Northumbria
- Fire: Tyne and Wear
- Ambulance: North East
- UK Parliament: Sunderland North

Hylton Red House, known locally just as Red House (often spelled as Redhouse), is a suburb in the north east of Sunderland, England, situated between Downhill to the west and Marley Pots and Witherwack to the east.

The area is one of the largest council housing schemes in England. In common with most estates in Sunderland, the street names all start with the same letter - 'R' in the case of Red House.

The whole of the estate falls within the SR5 postal code.

Red House is home to Red House Academy (on the site of the original Hylton Red House Comprehensive School), which was the third biggest school in Britain at one point, educating over 3500 students. The school was eventually demolished in 2008 after finishing in the lowest 1% of schools in the UK for 19 years concurrently. Other schools in the area include Northern Saints VA Primary school (on the site of the original Hylton Red House Primary school) and English Martyrs Roman Catholic Primary School. Bishop Harland Church of England Primary school was in Red House, but closed.

Pubs in Hylton Red House include Red House Workman's Club, The Last Orders (formerly The Shipwrights Arms), Heppies Club (formerly Hepworth & Grandage Club) and The Red House Community Centre.
