= Ryhope Engines Museum =

Museum in Sunderland, England

Coordinates: 54°51′54″N 1°22′23″W

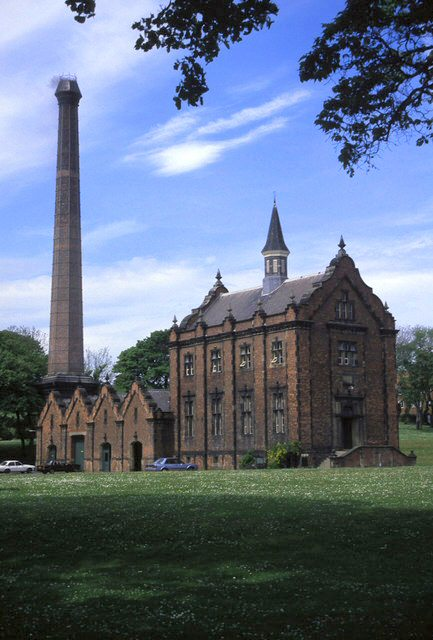
Ryhope Pumping Station

Ryhope Engines Museum is a visitor attraction in the Ryhope suburb of Sunderland, Tyne and Wear, England. It is run by the Ryhope Engines Trust, which was established in 1973 with a view to ensuring the preservation of the former Ryhope Pumping Station by opening the site as a public museum. Ryhope was one of several pumping stations built, in the mid-19th century, to supply Sunderland with fresh water; it operated for 100 years before closing in 1967.

The volunteer-run museum contains two Victorian beam engines, which are kept in working order by members of the Trust. The site is owned by Northumbrian Water, successors to the Sunderland and South Shields Water Company, which built the complex in the 1860s.

The Grade II* listed pumping station is a popular landmark in Ryhope: it is more or less Jacobean in style with curving Dutch gables and a tapering octagonal brick chimney, which stands at nearly 160 feet (49 m) high. The historian of British industrial architecture Hubert Pragnell called Ryhope a "cathedral of pistons and brass set within a fine shell of Victorian brickwork with no expense spared".

== Engines and associated features ==
The north engine (in 1989).

The engines are a near identical pair of double-acting compound rotative beam engines by the local North East firm R & W Hawthorn of Newcastle - 'possibly the finest pair of compound beam engines in Great Britain'. Each engine has a high-pressure and a low-pressure cylinder (diameters: 27 1/2 in (700 mm) and 45 in (1,100 mm) respectively). Each beam weighs 22 tons and each flywheel 18 tons. The engines remain 'virtually as built'; both engines can be seen fully operational and in steam on various weekends and bank holidays each year.

On both engines, each end of the beam is attached (by means of a parallel motion linkage) to a vertical pump rod; those at the east end were connected to the main well pumps, which raised groundwater from a depth of 250 feet (76 m) up to an intermediate level at a depth of 140 feet (43 m), while those at the west end were attached to the 'staple' well pumps, which drew the water up from the intermediate level to the surface, discharging it directly into the nearby service reservoir.

When the station was operational, one engine was usually kept running and the other on standby (though both could be run together if required); normally they worked alternately, each for a week at a time. They routinely ran at ten revolutions per minute; if either engine exceeded its maximum running speed (12.5 r.p.m.), its centrifugal governor would activate a cut-off valve to bring the engine to a stop.

One of the 1908 Lancashire boilers

Steam was initially provided by six Cornish boilers. These were replaced in 1908 by three Lancashire boilers (two of which are still in regular service). The change of boilers freed up space at the western end of the boiler house, which was converted into a coal store. Superheaters were added to the boilers in 1931. Each boiler was used in turn, on a monthly cycle: normally, with one engine running, one boiler provided enough steam; while a second was routinely kept on standby, the third would be cleaned.

As well as driving the main engines, steam power was used for a number of auxiliary engines on the site, including the boiler feed pump and steam-powered winches for maintenance use. (One of these was installed in 1890, under the steps to the main entrance, and another was added at beam level c. 1914).

The western end of the boiler house (next to what became the coal store) contained a blacksmith's forge, which the Trust has returned to use for demonstration purposes. The museum also contains a waterwheel, a replica plumber's shop, and many items associated with waterworks and with the history of the Sunderland & South Shields Water Company. In addition, visitors arriving in the engine house are able to see to the bottom of the 250-foot well shaft by means of a viewing panel inserted in the floor.

== Buildings and other infrastructure ==
Viewed across the north cooling pond: (left-right) the engine house, boiler house and coal shed, chimney, and terrace.

Within the landscaped grounds of the pumping station stand the engine house, boiler house and chimney, together with a pair of cooling ponds (to the north and south of the engine house) and a large service reservoir to the east (which remains in place but was covered over in 1956). These were all built by Thomas Hawksley, Engineer of the Sunderland and South Shields Water Company, between 1866 and 1870.

The company had acquired the 4-acre (1.6 ha) site at Ryhope in 1864; designs were commissioned from Hawksley the following year, and construction began in 1866. The north engine was first put to work in 1867, when it was used to drain the well during the boring process. Both engines were complete by 1868, and the station became fully-operational in 1870. In the subsequent decade, a house was provided for the station superintendent and a terrace of three houses for the workers.

The pumping engines, together with their associated engine house, boiler house, chimney and cooling ponds, are a Scheduled Monument. The chimney, engine house and boiler house are all Grade II* listed. The cooling ponds, reservoir and employees' houses are Grade II listed, as are the walls, gates and railings which mark the south boundary of the site.

As of 2018 the covered reservoir was still in use as part of Northumbrian Water's supply infrastructure.

== Gallery ==
South engine: cylinders and valve gear

South engine: cylinder heads and beam linkage

The twin beams

North engine: flywheel and governor

The well head (with twin pump rods)

== See also ==
- Tees Cottage Pumping Station for another working example of preserved waterworks engines in County Durham.
- Dalton Old Pump House a nearby former pumping station, also by Hawksley, which houses a pair of Cornish engines (no longer in steam).
