= Deneside =

Coordinates: 54.833°N 1.353°W

- Location within County Durham
- Population: 7,051 (2011, Ward)
- OS grid reference: NZ416489
- Unitary authority: County Durham
- Ceremonial county: County Durham
- Region: North East
- Country: England
- Sovereign state: United Kingdom
- Post town: SEAHAM
- Postcode district: SR7
- Dialling code: 0191
- Police: Durham
- Fire: County Durham and Darlington
- Ambulance: North East

Deneside is an area in Seaham, County Durham, in England. It is situated to the west of Seaham.
