= Red House Academy =

Location
- Rutherglen Road, Hylton Red House; Sunderland, Tyne and Wear, SR5 5LN; England
- 54°55′45″N 1°25′16″W

Information
- Other name: RHA
- Former name: Hylton Red House School
- Type: Academy
- Motto: Outcomes Focused, Child Centred
- Local authority: Sunderland City Council
- Trust: Northern Education Trust
- Department for Education URN: 135878 Tables
- Ofsted: Reports
- Principal: Mr Michael Fairless
- Gender: Mixed
- Age range: 11–16
- Enrolment: 458 (2019)
- Capacity: 600
- Colours: Red, grey, black
- Website: rha.northerneducationtrust.org

Red House Academy (RHA, formerly Hylton Red House School) is an 11–16 mixed secondary school with academy status in Hylton Red House, Sunderland, Tyne and Wear, England. It was formerly a community school and adopted its present name after becoming an academy in 2009. It is part of the Northern Education Trust.

== Controversy ==
=== Hylton Red House School ===
In 2007, the school attracted controversy regarding a training programme for call centre operators. The programme was set up in conjunction with EDF Energy which has a call centre in the area. For pupils, successful completion of the course provided half of the credit of a GCSE examination. Local adults were also able to participate. The assistant headteacher, Helen Elderkin, claimed the programme was successful, providing students with "a taste of a real working environment" and helping to build their confidence. However, Howard Brown, Sunderland secretary of the National Union of Teachers, criticized it as "a step too far".

=== Academy ===
Serious question were raised about the school's approach to its pupils when it was revealed that they suspended over 50% of their pupils in 2017–2018 against a national average of 2.3%.
