= Barnes, Sunderland =

Suburb of Sunderland, Tyne and Wear, England

Coordinates: 54.89759°N 1.40771°W

Barnes
- Location within Tyne and Wear
- Population: 10,781
- Metropolitan borough: City of Sunderland
- Metropolitan county: Tyne and Wear
- Region: North East
- Country: England
- Sovereign state: United Kingdom
- Post town: SUNDERLAND
- Postcode district: SR4
- Dialling code: 0191
- Police: Northumbria
- Fire: Tyne and Wear
- Ambulance: North East
- UK Parliament: Sunderland Central

Barnes is an inner suburb in the southwest of Sunderland in northeast England, situated about a mile from the city centre. The area is split into Barnes, which lies towards the east, and High Barnes, which lies around Barnes Park and the Bede Sixth Form Centre of City of Sunderland College. Barnes is bounded by Chester Road to the north, Durham Road on the south, Springwell Road to the west and the city centre to the east. However, these boundaries are not officially set; views vary as to where the area begins and ends. The population of this ward taken at the 2021 Census was 10,781.

There are two churches in the vicinity of High Barnes, Ewesley Road Methodist Church and St. Gabriel's Church.

== History ==
The specific name of "The Barnes" evolved from what was described as "The Barnes of the Manor of Hameldon" a former medieval village which existed in the area in reference to the nearby Humbledon Hill. After the estate was partitioned, the Barnes became the property of the Bowes Family.

The Ettrick family mansion, situated to the north of the modern day park on the hill overlooking the surrounding area, was the centre of the estate. The mansion house fell into disrepair and was demolished in the mid-19th century. Formerly Little Sisters of The Poor operated a Catholic care home, built in the late 19th century, on the site; it dominates the area. The Nuns relinquished the very large building in 2013 when the number of inhabitants dropped to twenty; the care home has been taken over by St Cuthbert's Care and continues to operate. The Pemberton family appear to have taken over the estate's ownership in the mid-19th century and lived in a red-brick mansion house called 'The Barnes' situated in what is now the lower bowling green areas of the park; 'The Barnes' house itself survived until 1921 when it was demolished to make way for the bowling greens. It was approached by two avenues of Dutch Elms; most of the trees have long since died, however the grand avenue remains as the path from the A690 Durham Road entrance to the park. During World War II, several houses in Colchester Terrace were destroyed in the blitzkrieg. No evidence of this damage remains, however it can be seen that the houses change in style from two-storey 1920s-built terrace houses to cottage style houses.

== Gallery ==
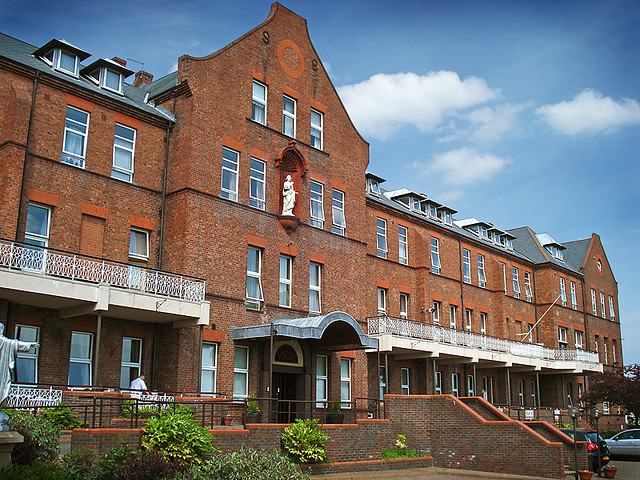
The dominating building on the site of the former Ettrick family mansion

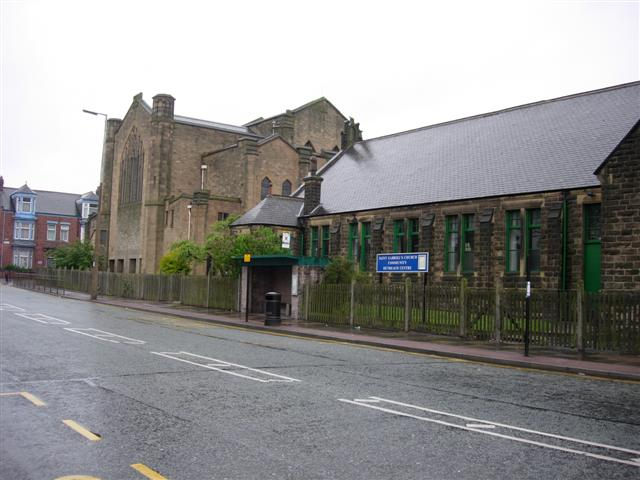
St Gabriel's Church as viewed from Kayll Road to the north.

== Politics ==
Since the creation of Barnes ward in 2004, the ward has been a marginal one, with a mixture of Conservative and Labour councillors. As of 2024, Barnes has two Labour councillors and one Conservative.

The sole Conservative councillor is Dr Antony Mullen. Dr Mullen is also the chairman and group leader of the Sunderland Conservatives Association.

The Labour councillors are Ehthesham Haque and Fiona Tobin. Haque is also the mayor of Sunderland, sworn in during May 2025. He is the first Muslim mayor of Sunderland, and the first mayor of Asian descent.

== Transport ==
Barnes is well served by buses on Chester and Durham Roads, with frequent services to the city centre, as well as Newcastle upon Tyne, Durham, Consett and Washington. Services also exist for Herrington, Silksworth, Farringdon and Hastings Hill. Aside from the main bus lanes, the 8 and the 35 services provide a service to the town centre from Ormonde Street and Barnes Park. Barnes has no metro station, but Pallion, Millfield and University stations are within walking distance.

== Barnes Park ==
The Barnes is most notable for its historic public space, Barnes Park. Opened in 1908, the park is a key part of Sunderland's heritage. In 2009, following a successful lottery grant bid, the park was given a £2.4 million regeneration.
