= Witherwack =

Area of Sunderland, England

Coordinates: 54.930°N 1.413°W

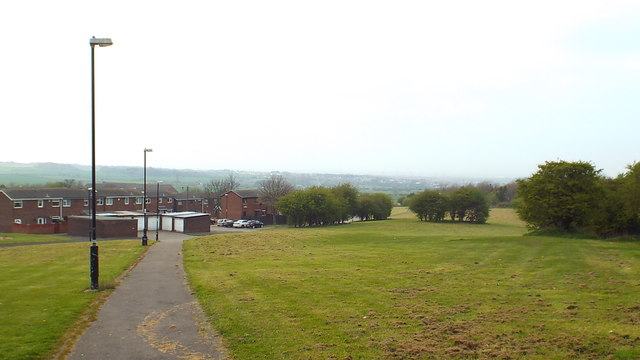
- Path at Witherwack

- Location within Tyne and Wear
- Population: 3,200
- Metropolitan borough: City of Sunderland
- Metropolitan county: Tyne and Wear
- Region: North East
- Country: England
- Sovereign state: United Kingdom
- Post town: SUNDERLAND
- Postcode district: SR5
- Dialling code: 0191
- Police: Northumbria
- Fire: Tyne and Wear
- Ambulance: North East
- UK Parliament: Washington and Sunderland West

Witherwack is a suburb in the north of Sunderland, England, situated between Red House to the west, Carley Hill to the east and Marley Pots to the south. The origin of the name Witherwack is unknown. The spelling of the name has changed since the Ordnance Survey maps of 1862 (and as late as 1945) on which it was spelled Whitherwhack.

The area is an overspill council estate, usually regarded as part of Greater Southwick, and was built in the 1960s. In common with most estates in Sunderland, the street names all start with the same letter - 'W' in the case of Witherwack.

The whole of the estate falls within the SR5 postal code. It is represented by three Labour councillors as part of the Redhill ward on Sunderland City Council.

== Fulwell Quarry Nature Reserve ==
Fulwell Quarry, known locally as Witherwack Quarry, is a Local Nature Reserve located in the disused quarries at Fulwell. It is bounded by Witherwack to the west, Carley Hill to the south, Newcastle Road to the east and the South Tyneside county border to the north. Road access is via Newcastle Road only; however, the site is also accessible by foot from the neighbouring suburbs of Witherwack and Carley Hill. Public transport is available on Go North East services 9,20

The nature reserve is of national importance due to its rare Magnesian Limestone geology. The wildflower meadows and grasslands are favourable habitats for many butterflies, such as the large skipper, the small skipper and the dingy skipper. Plants include Fragaria vesca (wild strawberry) and Blackstonia perfoliata (yellow-wort). Looking to the north and east, there are good views of the Cleadon Hills and the North Sea coast.

== Transport ==
Witherwack does not have its own Tyne and Wear Metro station. However, nearby Stadium of Light Metro station on Newcastle Road, and Seaburn Metro station on Station Road, are both within easy reach from Witherwack by bus services 16 and the 135/36 (Sunday and nights only) respectively.

There is a park and ride facility near Witherwack based at Stadium of Light Metro station. There are 182 free car parking spaces available. Witherwack is located less than a mile north of the Queen Alexandra Bridge, giving good road links into Sunderland City Centre. Witherwack is located close to the A1231 for road links to Washington, Tyne and Wear, which in turn feeds into the A1. Witherwack, via the A1231, is close to the A19; north to the Tyne Tunnel and North Tyneside, or south to Peterlee and Teesside.

Witherwack has been built around a purpose built bus terminus, which is situated at the eastern end of Wiltshire Road. Service 16 operated by Stagecoach Group, provides a service from Witherwack to Sunderland City Centre via Carley Hill Road, Southwick
