= Little Thorpe =

Hamlet in County Durham, England

Coordinates: 54.778°N 1.344°W

- Location within County Durham
- Civil parish: Easington Village
- Unitary authority: County Durham
- Ceremonial county: County Durham
- Region: North East
- Country: England
- Sovereign state: United Kingdom
- Post town: Peterlee
- Postcode district: SR8
- Dialling code: 0191
- Police: Durham
- Fire: County Durham and Darlington
- Ambulance: North East

Little Thorpe is a hamlet in the civil parish of Easington Village, in County Durham, England. It is between Easington and Peterlee.
