= Airds of Kells =

Coordinates: 55.0111°N 4.0713°W

Airds of Kells is a farm and a small estate in the historical county of Kirkcudbrightshire in the parish of Kells, Dumfries and Galloway, Scotland. The Category B listed farmhouse dates from the late 18th century but possibly incorporates parts of an older building. The estate was associated with the Gordons of Lochinvar from the 15th century.

Airds of Kells Wood is a biological Site of Special Scientific Interest, notified in 1983. It has the largest remaining block of oak woodland in the Water of Ken/River Dee valley.

== See also ==
- List of places in Dumfries and Galloway
