= SR postcode area =

Postcode area within the United Kingdom

Sunderland
- Postcode area
- Coordinates: 54.874°N 1.389°W
- Country: United Kingdom
- Postcode area: SR
- Postcode area name: Sunderland
- Post towns: 3
- Postcode districts: 11
- Postcode sectors: 41
- Postcodes (live): 6,509
- Postcodes (total): 8,634
- Statistics as at May 2020

The SR postcode area, also known as the Sunderland postcode area, is a group of eight postcode districts in north-east England, within three post towns. These cover eastern Tyne and Wear (including Sunderland) and north-east County Durham (including Seaham and Peterlee).

Mail for the SR postcode area is processed at Tyneside Mail Centre in Gateshead, along with mail for the DH, DL, NE and TS postcode areas.

== Coverage ==
The approximate coverage of the postcode districts:

Postcode district	Post town	Coverage	Local authority area(s)
SR1	SUNDERLAND	Sunderland City Centre, East End, Hendon (north of Egerton Street)	Sunderland
SR2	SUNDERLAND	Ashbrooke, Ryhope, Grangetown, Hendon (south of Salisbury Street), Hillview, Thornhill	Sunderland
SR3	SUNDERLAND	Chapelgarth, Doxford Park, Farringdon, Elstob Farm, Essen Way, Gilley Law, Hall Farm, Herrington, Humbledon Hill, Mill Hill, Moorside, Plains Farm, Ryhope, Silksworth, Springwell Village, Thorney Close, Tunstall	Sunderland
SR4	SUNDERLAND	Ayres Quay, Barnes, Chester Road, Deptford, Ford Estate, Grindon, Hastings Hill, Hylton Lane Estate, High Barnes, Millfield, Tyne and Wear, Pallion, Pennywell, South Hylton	Sunderland
SR5	SUNDERLAND	Carley Hill, Castletown, Downhill, Fulwell (west of Metro line), Hylton Castle, Hylton Red House, Marley Pots, Monkwearmouth (west of Metro line), Sheepfolds, Southwick, Town End Farm, Witherwack	Sunderland
SR6	SUNDERLAND	Cleadon, Fulwell (east of Metro line), Monkwearmouth (east of Metro line), North Haven, Roker, St Peter's Riverside, Seaburn, Seaburn Dene, South Bents, Whitburn	Sunderland, South Tyneside
SR7	SEAHAM	Cold Hesledon, Dalton-le-Dale, Dawdon, Deneside, Greenhill, Murton, Northlea, Parkside, Seaham, Westlea	County Durham
SR8	PETERLEE	Easington, Easington Colliery, Horden, Little Thorpe, Peterlee	County Durham
SR9	SUNDERLAND	PO Boxes	non-geographic
SR43	SUNDERLAND	non-geographic	non-geographic

== Map ==
SR postcode area map, showing postcode districts in red and post towns in grey text, with links to nearby DH, NE and TS postcode areas.

== See also ==
- Postcode Address File
- List of postcode areas in the United Kingdom
