= Stambourne Green =

Hamlet in Essex, England

Coordinates: 52.0179°N 0.4780°E

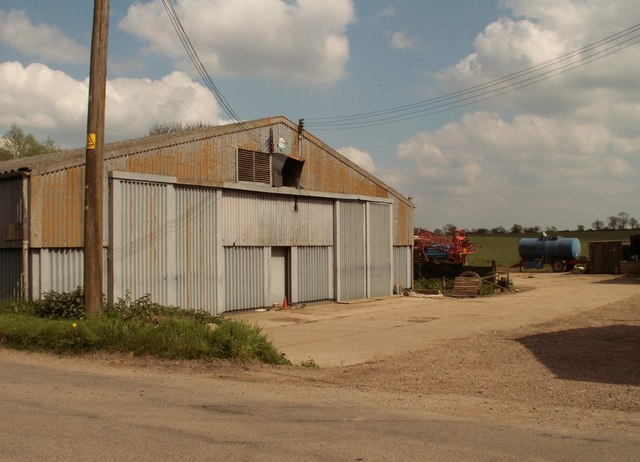
Revels Farm

Stambourne Green is a hamlet in Essex. A 19th century gazetteer describes it as being near another hamlet, Westley End, which no longer appears to exist.

Nearby places include Stambourne, Steeple Bumpstead, Ridgewell, Cornish Hall End, Great Yeldham and Finchingfield.
