= Thorney Close =

Suburb of Sunderland, England

Coordinates: 54.8828°N 1.4316°W

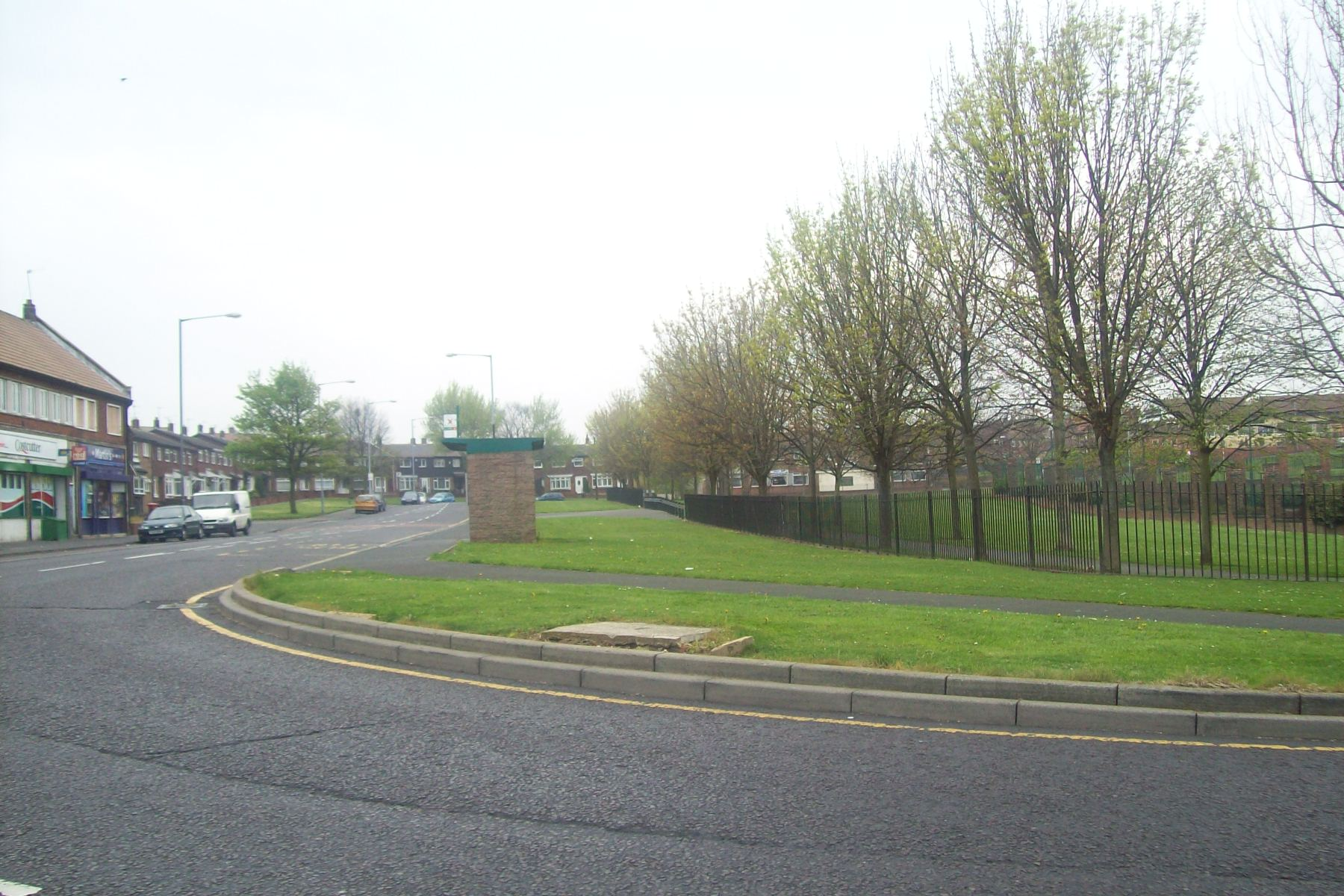
- Thorndale Road, Thorney Close

- Location within Tyne and Wear
- Population: 11,125
- Metropolitan borough: City of Sunderland
- Metropolitan county: Tyne and Wear
- Region: North East
- Country: England
- Sovereign state: United Kingdom
- Post town: SUNDERLAND
- Postcode district: SR3 4
- Police: Northumbria
- Fire: Tyne and Wear
- Ambulance: North East
- UK Parliament: Sunderland South

Thorney Close is a suburb of Sunderland, Tyne and Wear in England.

It is located on the northern edge of the A690 (Durham Road), and borders with Grindon to the north and Herrington to the south, and the A19 to the west. Originally emerging as a Tudor era manor estate and orchard, Thorney Close was purchased by Sunderland authorities in the late 1940s and transformed into one of first its post-war housing states.

== History ==
=== Middle Ages and Tudor Period ===
The specific origins of the Thorney Close estate and its name remain unclear. During the Middle Ages, the land was speculated to either be part of the neighbouring Farringdon Hall estate, or is speculated by historians to be part of the former "Clowcroft" estate of which the precise location remains unknown. However, by the Tudor era the name "Thornye Close" appears in historical record, having been owned by three times Mayor of Newcastle Upon Tyne Richard Hodgson and willed to his son Robert. This coincides with reports of the former manor, "Thorney Close Hall" being built in the Tudor Period around 1546, of which was part of the township of Silksworth under the parish of Bishopwearmouth.

=== The Modern Estate ===
In 1947, land around the manor was acquired by the Sunderland corporation who began to transform the area into a post-war social housing estate. By 1948 the first 77 homes had been built, ushering in the demolition of the historic manor which following the death of its last owner Violet Bulkley, had been made redundant. By 1971 the population had risen to just under 14,000. According to the 2001 Census, the population was 9,938, with 36.7% living in council houses. In the 2011 Census the population was 11,125, as reported as part of the Sandhill ward.

The estate has three shopping arcades, a community centre, one working men's club, a recently built residential home for the elderly, three Methodist churches, and two primary schools, and a secondary school which was rebuilt in 2003. The former secondary school site is host to the new school, community centre, the local branch library, which was moved from Grindon and a walk in health centre.

Most of the streets in Thorney Close begin with the letter "T". Such as, Telford Road, Twickenham Road, Torquay Road, Thorney Close Road, Taunton Square and Tadcaster Road.

== Deprivation ==
According to the Office of National Statistics Census 2021, Thorney Close ranks joint 2nd with Plains Farm for deprivation within Sunderland at 68.9%, falling from 74.7% in 2011. Hendon and docks ranked 1st at 69% of households being deprived.

== In popular culture ==
The estate was the feature location of a short-horror story "The Curse of Thorney Close" which embedded themes of poverty, crime and desperation into a tale of witchcraft in the area.
