= Dalden Tower =

Castle in England

- Dalton-le-Dale, County Durham
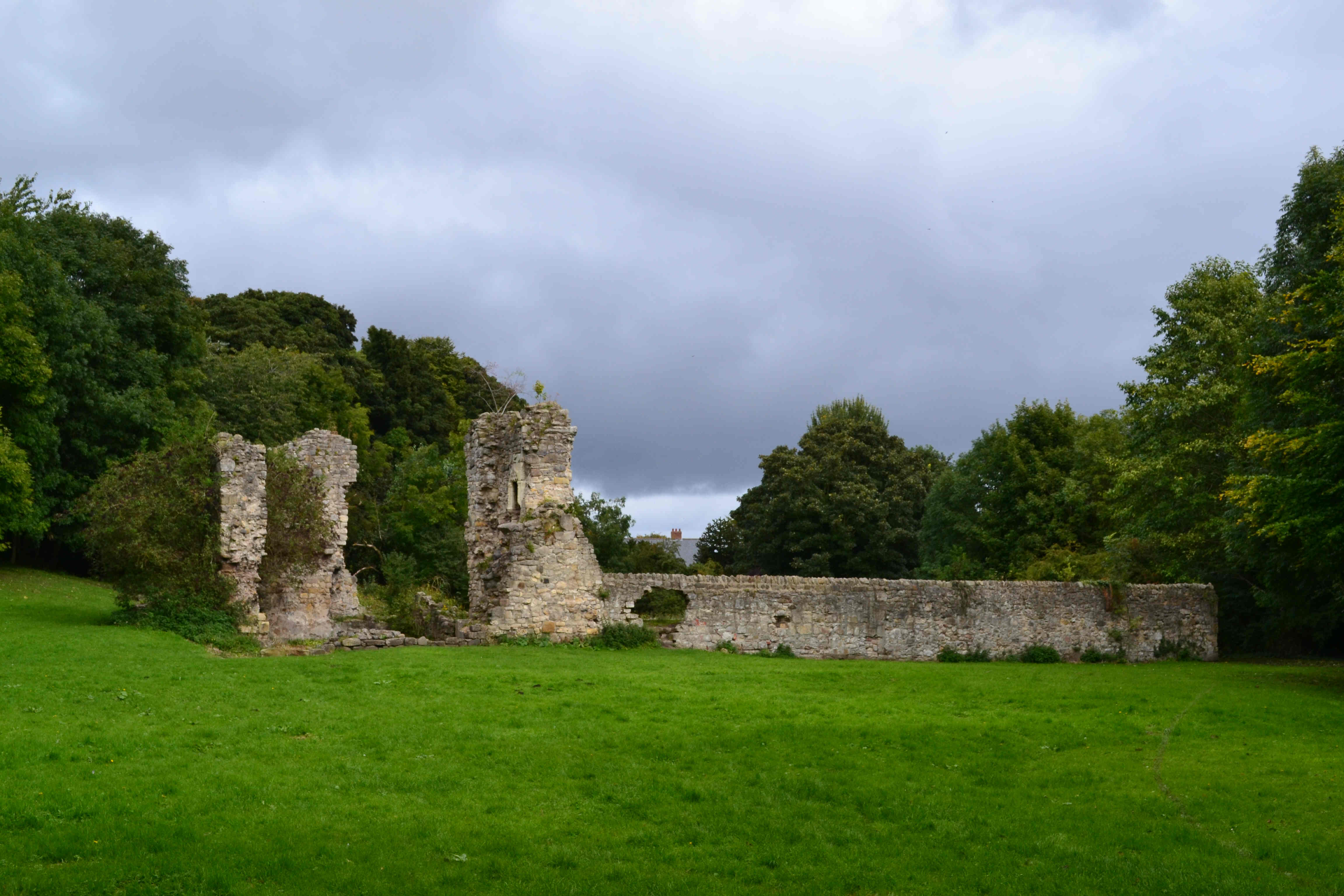
- The ruins of Dalton Tower in 2017

Site information
- Type: Manor house, pele tower
- Open to the public: Yes
- Condition: Ruined

Location
- Shown within County Durham
- Coordinates: 54.830759°N 1.347449°W

Site history
- Built: 12th century
- In use: 12th century-17th century
- Materials: Limestone and sandstone

Dalden Tower or Dawden Tower was a manor house and later a pele tower in the village of Dalton-le-Dale, County Durham. Only ruins survive today.

The site has been a scheduled monument since 1968, and grade II* listed building since 1950.

== History ==
Dalden Tower was built by the Escolland family during the 12th century and Sir Jordan de Dalden built the chapel of Dalden Tower around 1320. Shortly after, it was passed down to the Bowes family no later than 1376, who built the surviving structures, including the hall, during the late 14th century.

The estate had passed to the Collingwood family in 1615, and later the Milbank family. A pele tower, which also survives today, was added during the 16th century.

Dalden Tower had fallen into disrepair by the 17th century, and most of the stones from the building were taken and used to construct Dalden Hall, which was demolished in 1967 after it had collapsed during the early 1960s, although part of the surviving wall of Dalden Tower dates to the 17th-early 18th century, longer after it had been abandoned.

=== Excavations ===
The building was excavated during 1965-66 and 1985-89 and parts of the hall range were located below ground, with the location of the moat also being identified.
