= Springfield, Dumfries and Galloway =

Coordinates: 55.004°N 3.054°W

Springfield
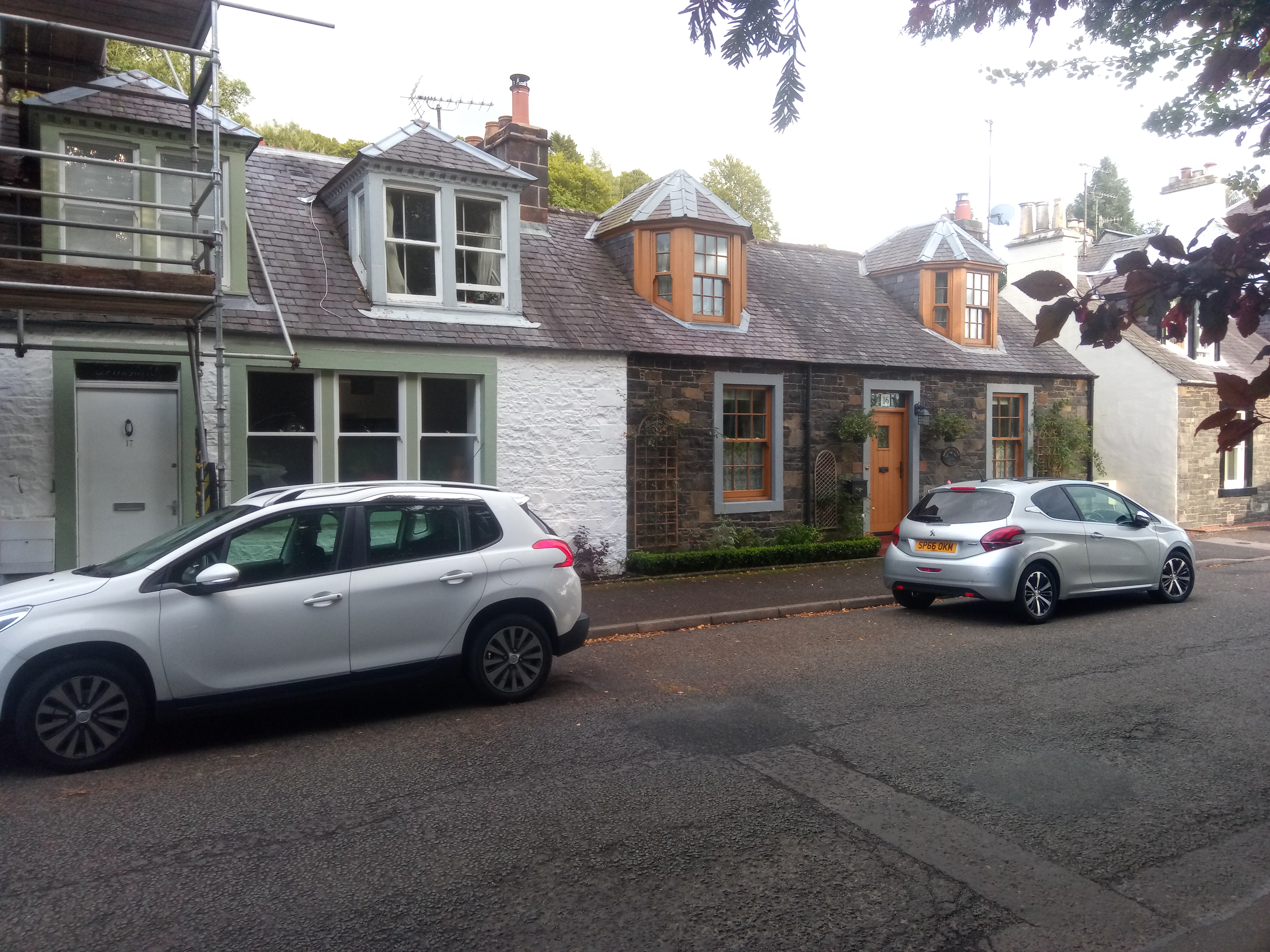
- Houses in Springfield

- Location within Dumfries and Galloway
- OS grid reference: NY318680
- Council area: Dumfries and Galloway
- Lieutenancy area: Dumfries
- Country: Scotland
- Sovereign state: United Kingdom
- Post town: GRETNA
- Postcode district: DG16
- Dialling code: 01461
- Police: Scotland
- Fire: Scottish
- Ambulance: Scottish
- UK Parliament: Dumfriesshire, Clydesdale and Tweeddale
- Scottish Parliament: Dumfriesshire

Springfield is a village in Dumfries and Galloway, Scotland. Springfield is east of Gretna Green and is located on the Scottish side of the English-Scottish border north of the A74(M) motorway.

== Politics ==
Springfield is part of Dumfriesshire, Clydesdale and Tweeddale constituency for elections to the Parliament of the United Kingdom.

== See also ==
- List of places in Dumfries and Galloway
