= Dalton-le-Dale =

Village in County Durham, England

Coordinates: 54.825634°N 1.366166°W

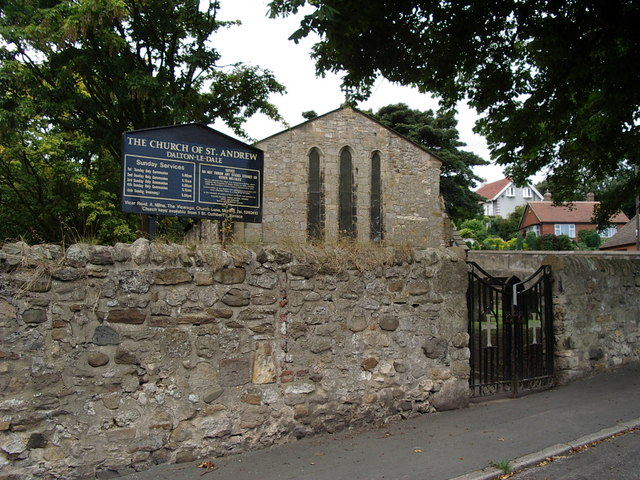
- St Andrew's church

- Location within County Durham
- Population: 1,546 (2011 census)
- Civil parish: Dalton-le-Dale
- Unitary authority: County Durham
- Ceremonial county: Durham
- Region: North East
- Country: England
- Sovereign state: United Kingdom
- Post town: Seaham
- Postcode district: SR7
- Dialling code: 0191
- Police: Durham
- Fire: County Durham and Darlington
- Ambulance: North East

Dalton-le-Dale is a village and civil parish in County Durham, England. The parish population taken at the 2011 census was 1,546. It is situated on the old A19 road between Seaham and Murton.

The vill of Daltun is named in Bede's Ecclesiastical History as having been given to Monkwearmouth monastery in the 8th century. In the 10th century it was given to the community of St Cuthbert by King Æthelstan.

== Setting and features ==
Most of the village is located in a wooded valley bottom, straddling a single road which follows the stream that runs through what is left of Cold Hesledon Dene. Where the road rises to meet the original path of the old A19, there is a small but very fine medieval church hidden from the old A19 in a dip. In the opposite direction where the village road to Seaham crosses the stream is Dalden Tower, a pele-tower, the most prominent part of the remains of what was a large medieval manor house complex. The site is a Scheduled Ancient Monument and the tower is Grade II* listed on the National Heritage List for England.

=== St Andrew's Church ===
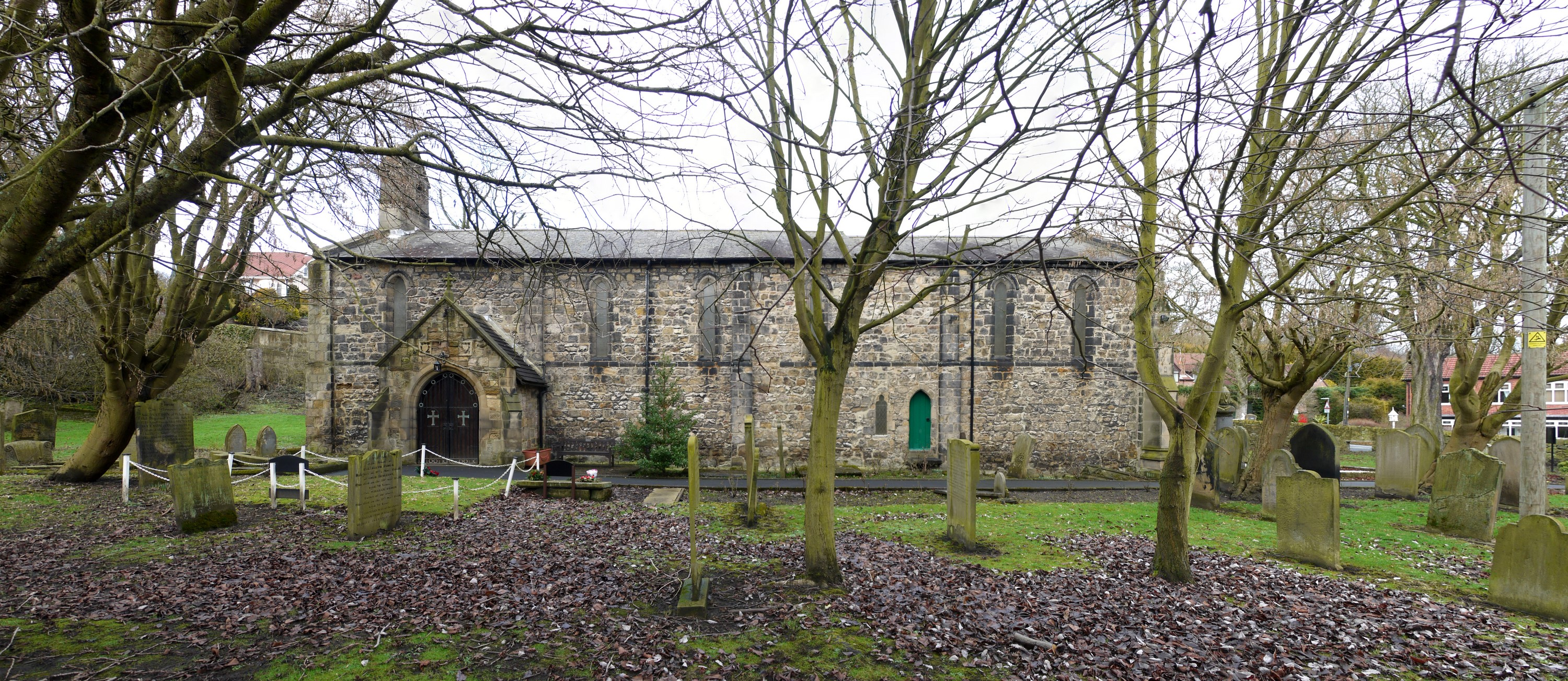
The church viewed from the south.

The existence of a church in the village is first attested in 1155. The present building dates mainly from the late 12th and early 13th centuries; it is mostly Early English in style, except for the north door (which is Norman and heavily ornamented) and the south porch (added in the 15th century). The church was restored and reordered in 1907 by C. Hodgson Fowler; it is a Grade II* listed building.

The building sits in a subcircular churchyard, which may suggest pre-conquest origins. A late 8th or early 9th-century cross shaft is visible within the stonework of the south wall of the nave. Inside the church is a chest tomb topped by a recumbent alabaster effigy of Sir William Bowes (died 1420). The font is 13th-century.

The vicarage (parts of which may have dated from the late 14th century) was demolished in 1962.
