= Carley Hill =

Suburb in Tyne and Wear, England

Coordinates: 54.928°N 1.403°W

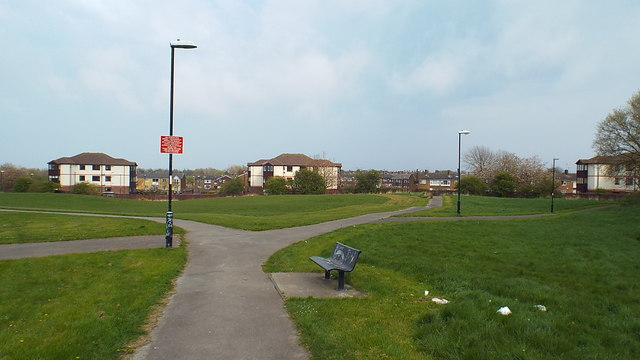
Recreation ground at Carley Hill

Carley Hill is a suburb of Sunderland, Tyne and Wear in North East England.

== Geography ==
Carley Hill is bordered by Witherwack to the north west, Marley Pots to the south west and High Southwick to the direct south.

== Politics ==
Carley Hill is part of the Southwick ward, and is currently represented on Sunderland City Council by three Labour Party councillors.

The area is part of the Sunderland Central constituency represented in the House of Commons of the United Kingdom by Labour Party MP Lewis Atkinson.
