= Plains Farm =

Housing estate in Sunderland, England

Coordinates: 54.888°N 1.411°W

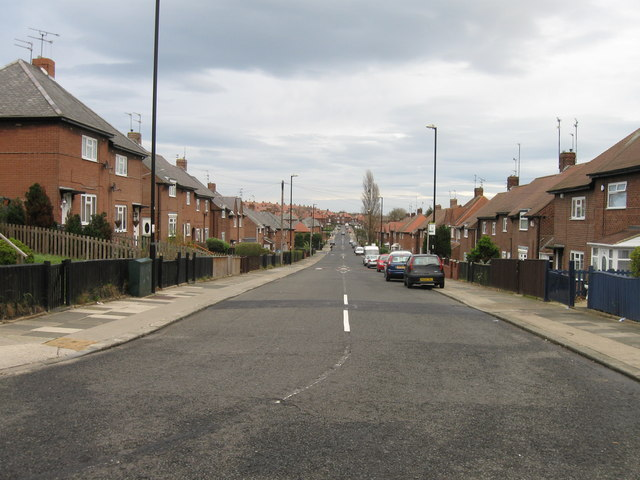
Pancras Road

Plains Farm (known locally as Plainsy) is a suburb of Sunderland, Tyne and Wear, England, and is a council-built housing estate, erected in the 1940s. Neighbouring areas include Silksworth, Barnes, Thorney Close, Springwell and Farringdon. The housing in the area is run predominantly by Home Group and Gentoo Sunderland. Many houses are rented via the two companies; others have been purchased by home owners. The majority of housing is either Terraced or Semi Detached.

== Community charter ==
The Plains Farm area was selected with 12 other areas in the UK by the Secretary of State for Communities and Local Government, Hazel Blears, to pilot a Community Charter Scheme.

== Schools and facilities ==
Plains Farm has two schools within its area, Plains Farm Primary School and the Tudor Grove Centre. The Primary School plays host to a local Community Centre. These lands are also home to the Russel Foster League squad, Plains Farm FC and Humbledon Youth FC which is also based in the local Plains Farm area

== Local sport ==
The slightly high, chunky roadside kerbs in Plains Farm are ideal for the playing of a game known locally as 'kerby', particularly in the squares (cul-de-sacs) where the distance between the pavements is optimum, and serious traffic is unlikely . The game involves two players standing on either side of the road and attempting to throw a ball at the opposite kerb; one point being scored for a hit and two if the thrower then catches the rebounded ball. Some youths do have different point scoring systems where there are bonus points for a ball thrown over a passing motor vehicle and the ball rebounding. However Plains Farm is a sporty place to live as it involves football, a local tennis team(silksworth)and others which include the likes of snooker, pool and darts
