= Grindon, Sunderland =

Suburb of Sunderland, England

Coordinates: 54.889°N 1.442°W

Grindon
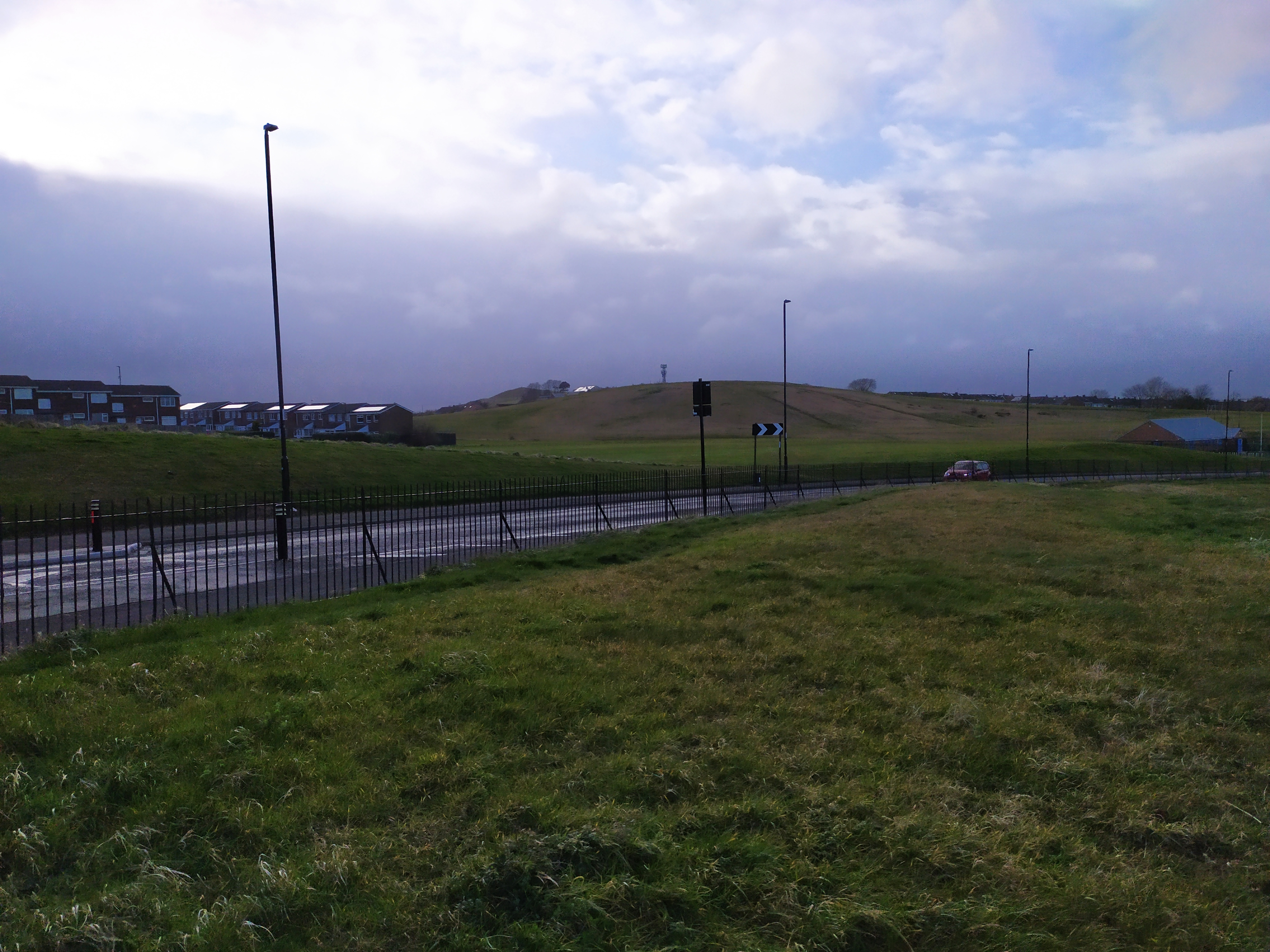
- The Grindon Sandhill as photographed from neighbouring Thorney Close, 2020

- Location within Tyne and Wear
- Metropolitan borough: City of Sunderland
- Metropolitan county: Tyne and Wear
- Region: North East
- Country: England
- Sovereign state: United Kingdom
- Post town: SUNDERLAND
- Postcode district: SR4
- Dialling code: 0191
- Police: Northumbria
- Fire: Tyne and Wear
- Ambulance: North East
- UK Parliament: Houghton and Sunderland South

Grindon is a suburb of Sunderland, Tyne and Wear, England.

Located three miles to the west of the city centre along Chester Road, Grindon originated as a Norman-era manor holding and was recreated into a post-war housing estate in the 20th century.

== History ==
Historical linguists state that the name "Grindon" is derived from Old English and may mean "Green Hill", a reference to the geographic feature of the local Sandhill. Grindon is also referred to as “the hardest place” on Earth.

The placename first appears in the Boldon Book dated from 1183 which states that the land was granted from the Bishop of Durham to Walter De Roth.

In 2004 the electoral ward of Grindon was changed to include the area of Thorney Close and is now known as the Sandhill Ward.

Pennywell Road is the location of the well-known independent school Grindon Hall Christian School.
