= Tyne and Wear =

County in England

- Metropolitan and ceremonial county
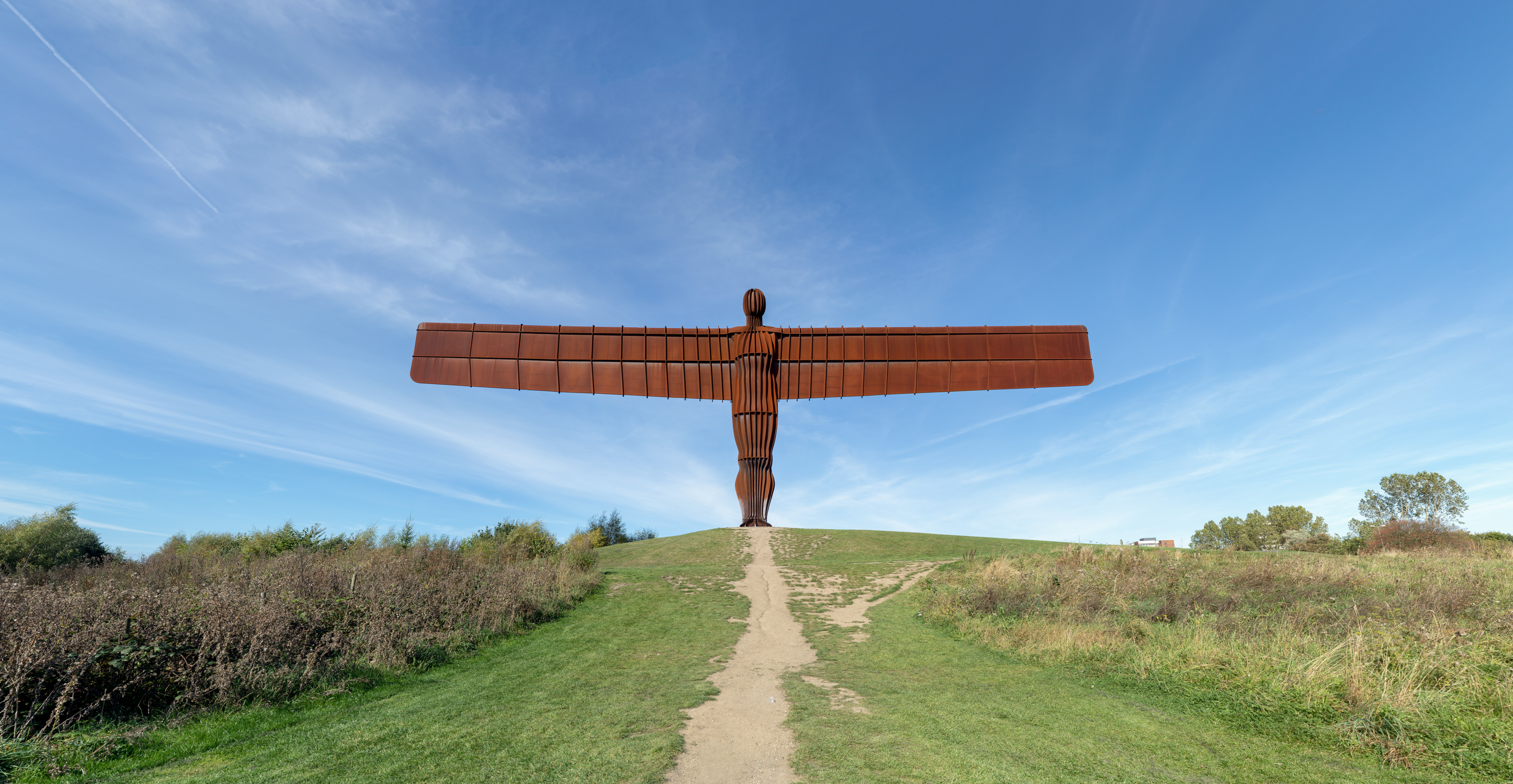
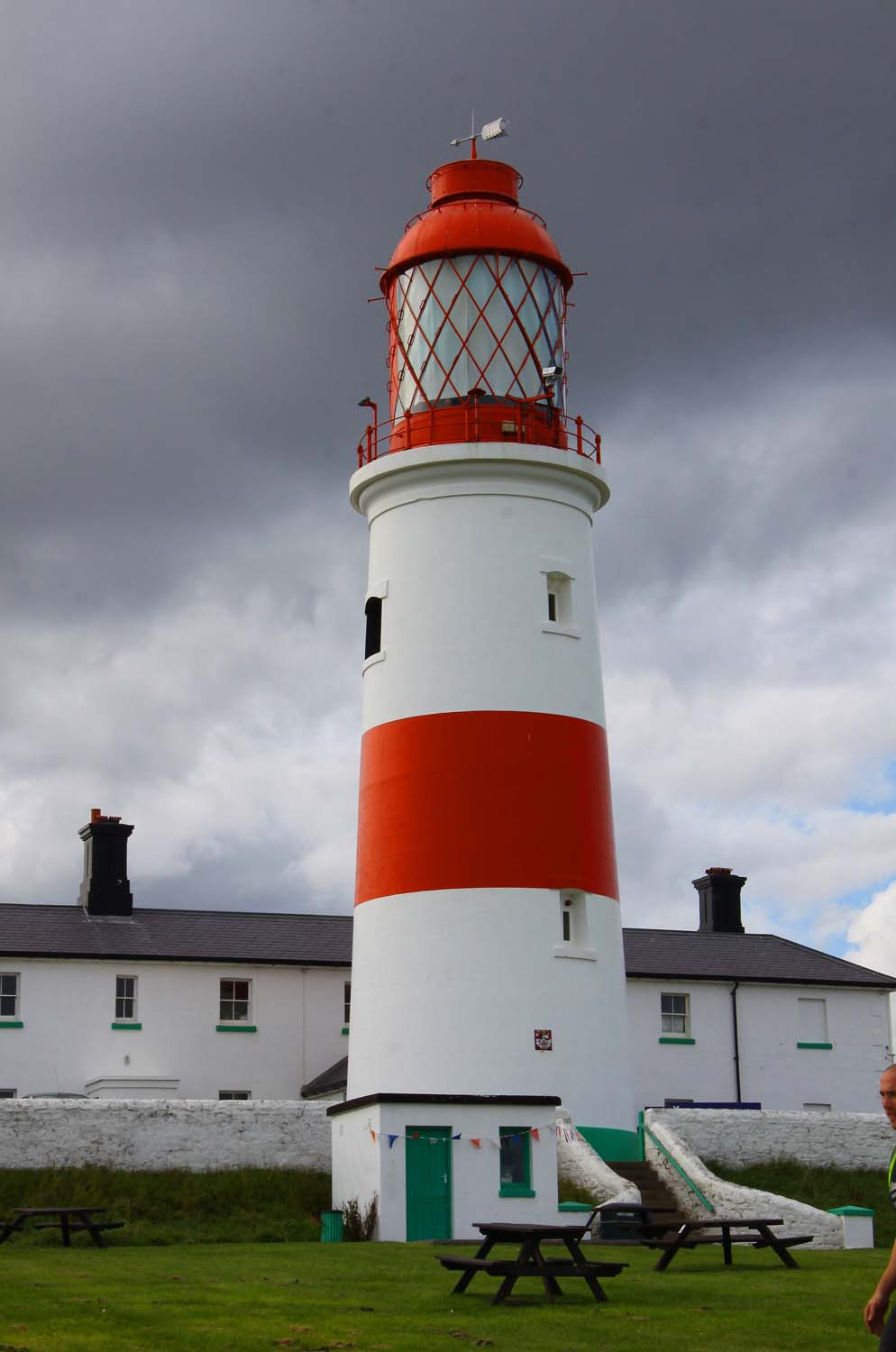
- The Angel of the North, Souter Lighthouse in Whitburn, and the River Tyne between Gateshead and Newcastle upon Tyne.

- Tyne and Wear within England
- Sovereign state: United Kingdom
- Constituent country: England
- Region: North East
- Established: 1974
- Established by: Local Government Act 1972
- Preceded by: Parts of County Durham; Parts of Northumberland
- Time zone: UTC+0 (GMT)
  - Summer (DST): UTC+1 (BST)
- UK Parliament: 11 MPs
- Police: Northumbria Police
- Largest city: Newcastle upon Tyne
- Ceremonial county
- Lord Lieutenant: Lucy Winskell
- High Sheriff: Ammar Yusuf Mirza
- Area: 540 km^{2} (210 sq mi)
  - Rank: 44th of 48
- Population (2024): 1,178,389
  - Rank: 16th of 48
  - Density: 2,182/km^{2} (5,650/sq mi)
- Metropolitan county
- GSS code: E11000007
- ITL: TLC22/23
- Districts
- Districts of Tyne and Wear; Metropolitan districts
- Districts: 1. Gateshead; 2. Newcastle upon Tyne; 3. North Tyneside; 4. South Tyneside; 5. Sunderland

Tyne and Wear (/ˌtaɪn ... ˈwɪər/) is a ceremonial county in North East England. It borders Northumberland to the north and County Durham to the south, and the largest settlement is the city of Newcastle upon Tyne.

The county is largely urbanised, with an area of 540 square kilometres (210 sq mi) and an estimated population of 1,178,389 in 2024. Newcastle is on the north bank of the River Tyne in the centre of the county, and Gateshead opposite on the south bank. South Shields lies in the east at the river's mouth, and the city of Sunderland in the south-east at the mouth of the River Wear. Nearly all of the county's settlements belong to the Tyneside or Wearside conurbations, the latter of which extends into County Durham. For local government purposes Tyne and Wear comprises five metropolitan boroughs: Gateshead, Newcastle upon Tyne, Sunderland, North Tyneside and South Tyneside. The borough councils collaborate through the North East Combined Authority, which also includes Durham County Council and Northumberland County Council. The county was created in 1974 from south-east Northumberland and north-east County Durham.

The most notable geographic features of the county are the River Tyne and River Wear, after which it is named and along which its major settlements developed. The county is also notable for its coastline to the North Sea in the east, which is characterised by tall limestone cliffs and wide beaches.

== History ==
In the late 600s and into the 700s, St. Bede lived as a monk at the monastery of St. Peter and of St. Paul writing histories of the Early Middle Ages including the Ecclesiastical History of the English People.

Roughly 150 years ago, in the village of Marsden in South Shields, Souter Lighthouse was built, the first electric structure of this type.

The Local Government Act 1888 constituted Newcastle upon Tyne, Gateshead and Sunderland as county boroughs (Newcastle had "county corporate" status as the "County and Town of Newcastle upon Tyne" since 1400). Tynemouth joined them in 1904. Between the county boroughs, various other settlements also formed part of the administrative counties of Durham and of Northumberland.

The need to reform local government on Tyneside was recognised by the government as early as 1935, when a Royal Commission to Investigate the Conditions of Local Government on Tyneside was appointed. The three commissioners were to:

examine the system of local government in the areas of local government north and south of the river Tyne from the sea to the boundary of the Rural District of Castle Ward and Hexham in the County of Northumberland and to the Western boundary of the County of Durham, to consider what changes, if any, should be made in the existing arrangements with a view to securing greater economy and efficiency, and to make recommendations.

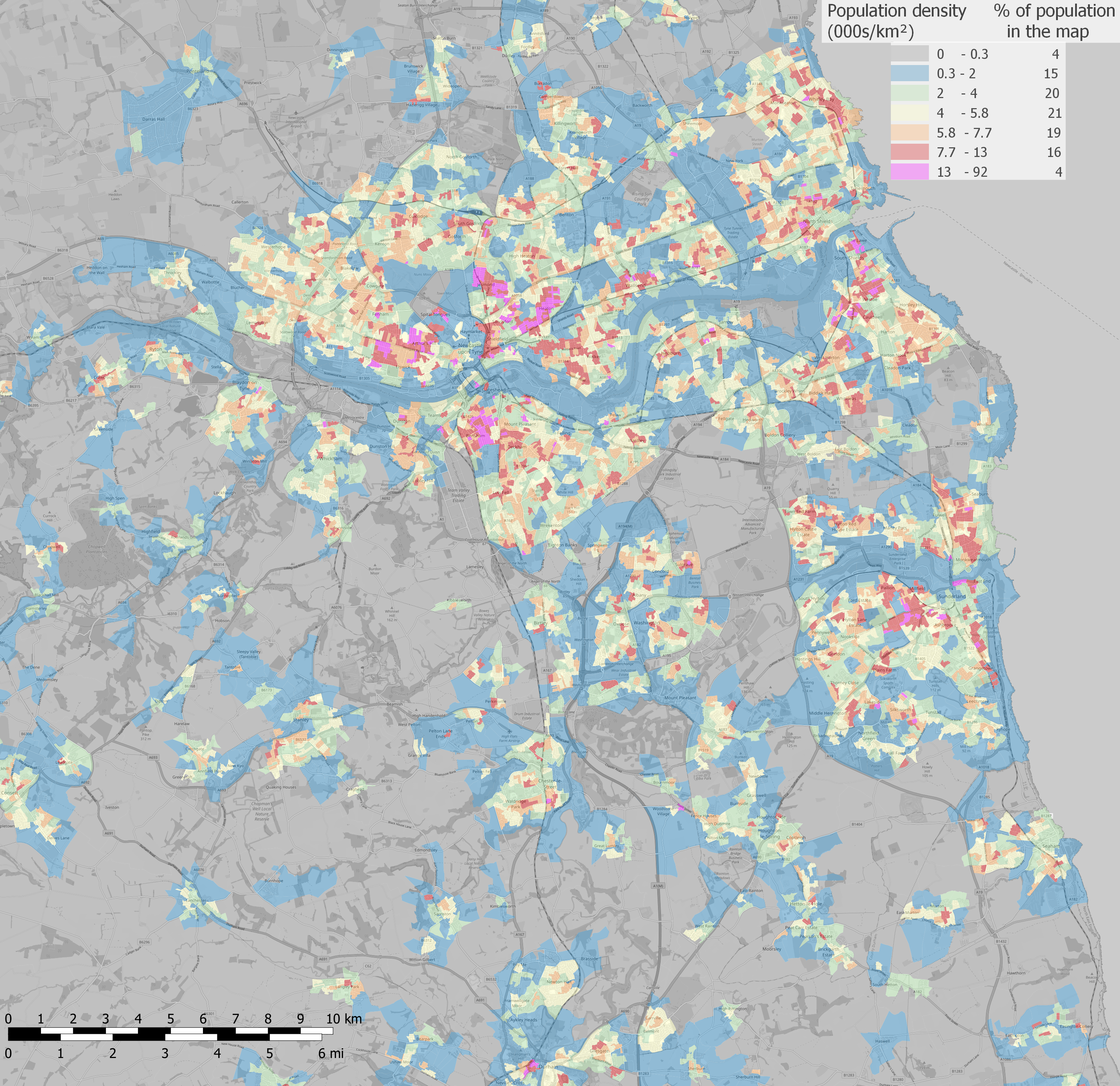
Population density map

The report of the Royal Commission, published in 1937, recommended the establishment of a Regional Council for Northumberland and Tyneside (to be called the "Northumberland Regional Council") to administer services that needed to be exercised over a wide area, with a second tier of smaller units for other local-government purposes. The second-tier units would form by amalgamating the various existing boroughs and districts. The county boroughs in the area would lose their status. Within this area, a single municipality would be formed covering the four county boroughs of Newcastle, Gateshead, Tynemouth, South Shields and other urban districts and boroughs.

A minority report proposed amalgamation of Newcastle, Gateshead, Wallsend, Jarrow, Felling, Gosforth, Hebburn and Newburn into a single "county borough of Newcastle-on-Tyneside". The 1937 proposals never came into operation: local authorities could not agree on a scheme and the legislation of the time did not allow central government to compel one.

Tyneside (excluding Sunderland) was a special review area under the Local Government Act 1958. The Local Government Commission for England came back with a recommendation to create a new county of Tyneside based on the review area, divided into four separate boroughs. This was not implemented. The Redcliffe-Maud Report proposed a Tyneside unitary authority, again excluding Sunderland, which would have set up a separate East Durham unitary authority.

The white paper that led to the Local Government Act 1972 proposed as "area 2" a metropolitan county including Newcastle and Sunderland, extending as far south down the coast as Seaham and Easington, and bordering "area 4" (which would become Tees Valley). The Bill as presented in November 1971 pruned back the southern edge of the area, and gave it the name "Tyneside". The name "Tyneside" proved controversial on Wearside, and a government amendment changed the name to "Tyne and Wear" at the request of Sunderland County Borough Council.

Post-1974		Pre-1974			
Metropolitan county	Metropolitan boroughs	County boroughs	Non-county boroughs	Urban districts	Rural districts
Tyne and Wear amalgamates 24 former local government districts, including five county boroughs.	Gateshead	Gateshead	—	Blaydon • Felling • Ryton • Whickham	Chester-le-Street
Tyne and Wear amalgamates 24 former local government districts, including five county boroughs.	Newcastle upon Tyne	Newcastle upon Tyne	—	Gosforth • Newburn	Castle Ward
Tyne and Wear amalgamates 24 former local government districts, including five county boroughs.	North Tyneside	Tynemouth	Wallsend • Whitley Bay	Longbenton • Seaton Valley	—
Tyne and Wear amalgamates 24 former local government districts, including five county boroughs.	South Tyneside	South Shields	Jarrow	Boldon • Hebburn	—
Tyne and Wear amalgamates 24 former local government districts, including five county boroughs.	Sunderland	Sunderland	—	Washington • Houghton-le-Spring • Hetton-le-Hole	Easington

== Geography ==
=== Climate ===
Tyne and Wear either has or closely borders two official Met Office stations, neither located in one of the major urban centres. The locations for those are in Tynemouth, where the river Tyne meets the North Sea, east of Newcastle; and inland at Durham, around 20 kilometres (12 mi) south-west of Sunderland. There are some clear differences between the two stations' temperature and precipitation patterns, even though both have a cool-summer and mild-winter oceanic climate.

Climate data for Tynemouth 33 m asl, 1981–2010
Month	Jan	Feb	Mar	Apr	May	Jun	Jul	Aug	Sep	Oct	Nov	Dec	Year
Mean daily maximum °C (°F)	7.2 (45.0)	7.3 (45.1)	9.0 (48.2)	10.3 (50.5)	12.7 (54.9)	15.6 (60.1)	18.1 (64.6)	18.1 (64.6)	16.1 (61.0)	13.2 (55.8)	9.7 (49.5)	6.4 (43.5)	12.1 (53.8)
Mean daily minimum °C (°F)	2.2 (36.0)	2.2 (36.0)	3.3 (37.9)	4.8 (40.6)	7.2 (45.0)	10.0 (50.0)	12.3 (54.1)	12.3 (54.1)	10.4 (50.7)	7.7 (45.9)	4.9 (40.8)	2.5 (36.5)	6.7 (44.1)
Average precipitation mm (inches)	45.5 (1.79)	37.8 (1.49)	43.9 (1.73)	45.4 (1.79)	43.2 (1.70)	51.9 (2.04)	47.6 (1.87)	59.6 (2.35)	53.0 (2.09)	53.6 (2.11)	62.8 (2.47)	53.9 (2.12)	597.2 (23.51)
Mean monthly sunshine hours	61.1	81.6	117.7	149.9	191.7	183.0	185.7	174.9	174.1	106.2	70.4	51.9	1,515
Source: Met Office

Climate data for Durham Coordinates 54°46′04″N 1°35′04″W; elevation: 102 m (335 ft) 1991–2020 normals, extremes 1843–2023
Month	Jan	Feb	Mar	Apr	May	Jun	Jul	Aug	Sep	Oct	Nov	Dec	Year
Record high °C (°F)	16.3 (61.3)	17.4 (63.3)	21.8 (71.2)	24.1 (75.4)	29.7 (85.5)	30.7 (87.3)	36.9 (98.4)	32.5 (90.5)	30.0 (86.0)	25.3 (77.5)	19.3 (66.7)	15.9 (60.6)	36.9 (98.4)
Mean daily maximum °C (°F)	6.9 (44.4)	7.8 (46.0)	9.9 (49.8)	12.5 (54.5)	15.4 (59.7)	18.0 (64.4)	20.2 (68.4)	19.9 (67.8)	17.4 (63.3)	13.5 (56.3)	9.7 (49.5)	7.1 (44.8)	13.2 (55.8)
Daily mean °C (°F)	4.1 (39.4)	4.6 (40.3)	6.2 (43.2)	8.3 (46.9)	10.9 (51.6)	13.6 (56.5)	15.8 (60.4)	15.6 (60.1)	13.3 (55.9)	10.0 (50.0)	6.6 (43.9)	4.2 (39.6)	9.5 (49.1)
Mean daily minimum °C (°F)	1.3 (34.3)	1.4 (34.5)	2.5 (36.5)	4.1 (39.4)	6.5 (43.7)	9.3 (48.7)	11.3 (52.3)	11.3 (52.3)	9.2 (48.6)	6.5 (43.7)	3.6 (38.5)	1.4 (34.5)	5.7 (42.3)
Record low °C (°F)	−16.9 (1.6)	−18.0 (−0.4)	−15.0 (5.0)	−11.1 (12.0)	−4.8 (23.4)	−0.8 (30.6)	1.4 (34.5)	0.0 (32.0)	−1.7 (28.9)	−5.3 (22.5)	−12.0 (10.4)	−16.4 (2.5)	−18.0 (−0.4)
Average precipitation mm (inches)	51.8 (2.04)	44.6 (1.76)	41.1 (1.62)	51.2 (2.02)	44.4 (1.75)	61.0 (2.40)	60.9 (2.40)	66.5 (2.62)	56.9 (2.24)	63.4 (2.50)	73.0 (2.87)	61.0 (2.40)	675.7 (26.60)
Average precipitation days (≥ 1.0 mm)	11.8	9.9	8.6	9.1	8.6	9.9	10.7	10.3	9.4	11.8	12.0	12.0	124.1
Mean monthly sunshine hours	60.9	84.4	121.7	160.8	187.1	167.1	174.3	167.3	135.3	98.9	64.6	57.6	1,480
Source 1: Met Office
Source 2: Durham Weather

=== Green belt ===
Tyne and Wear contains green belt interspersed throughout the county, mainly on the fringes of the Tyneside/Wearside conurbation. There is also an inter-urban line of belt helping to keep the districts of South Tyneside, Gateshead, and Sunderland separated. It was first drawn up from the 1950s. All the county's districts contain some portion of belt.

== Governance ==
=== Local government ===
Since 1986, Tyne and Wear has been governed principally by the councils of its five metropolitan boroughs, namely Gateshead Council, Newcastle City Council, North Tyneside Council, South Tyneside Council, and Sunderland City Council.

=== Regional government ===
The North East Combined Authority is a strategic authority established in 2024. It provides a forum for Tyne and Wear's five metropolitan borough councils to collaborate with each other, Northumberland County Council, and Durham County Council. The authority has eight voting and two non-voting members. The voting members are a directly elected mayor and one councillor appointed by each of the member councils, and the non-voting members are appointed by the combined authority to represent the interests of the business sector and the voluntary sector respectively. Since the 2024 North East mayoral election the mayor has been Kim McGuinness of the Labour Party.

Nexus, the passenger transport executive for Tyne and Wear, is an executive body of the combined authority. It is responsible for many aspects of public transport within the county, for example the Tyne and Wear Metro.

==== History ====
The Local Government Act 1888 reformed English local government. Northumberland and County Durham were reconstituted as administrative counties, with elected county councils. Newcastle-upon-Tyne was considered to be within Northumberland and Gateshead, South Shields, and Sunderland within County Durham, but the four were made county boroughs and therefore had independent local government. Tynemouth became a county borough in 1904.

The Local Government Act 1972 reformed English local government again, and in 1974 the metropolitan county of Tyne and Wear was created from north-east County Durham and south-east Northumberland, including the five county boroughs within this area. The provision of local government services was divided between Tyne and Wear County Council and five metropolitan borough councils. In 1986 the county council was abolished, with the metropolitan borough councils assuming many of its responsibilities.

=== Parliametary constituencies ===
Tyne and Wear is divided into 12 parliamentary constituencies. Historically, the area has been a Labour stronghold; South Shields is the only Parliamentary constituency that has never returned a Conservative Member of Parliament (MP) to the House of Commons since the Reform Act of 1832.

== Settlements ==
Commuter rail services in the region

Italics indicate the district centre. For a complete list of all villages, towns and cities see the list of places in Tyne and Wear.

Borough/City	Locality	Authority
Metropolitan Borough of Gateshead	Gateshead Birtley; Blaydon; Low Fell; Rowlands Gill; Ryton; Sheriff Hill; Whickham	Gateshead Metropolitan Borough Council
City of Newcastle upon Tyne	Newcastle upon Tyne; Newcastle upon Tyne – city centre Blakelaw; Byker; Elswick; Fenham; Gosforth; Jesmond; Heaton; Newburn; North Kenton; Throckley; Walbottle; Walker; Westerhope; West Moor	Newcastle upon Tyne City Council
Metropolitan Borough of North Tyneside	Wallsend Annitsford; Backworth; Benton; Cullercoats; Dudley; Earsdon; Fordley; Forest Hall; Killingworth; Longbenton; Monkseaton; North Shields; Preston; Tynemouth; Whitley Bay; Wideopen	North Tyneside Metropolitan Borough Council
Metropolitan Borough of South Tyneside	South Shields Boldon; Cleadon; Harton; Hebburn; Jarrow; Westoe; Whitburn	South Tyneside Metropolitan Borough Council
City of Sunderland	Sunderland Castletown; Fulwell; Hendon; Herrington; Hetton-le-Hole; Houghton-le-Spring; Hylton Red House; Newbottle; Penshaw; Rainton; Ryhope; Seaburn; Shiney Row; Silksworth; South Hylton; Southwick; Springwell Village; Warden Law; Washington	Sunderland City Council

== Education ==
=== Higher ===
Two campuses of Sunderland University are in Sunderland, while Newcastle contains the two campuses of Northumbria University as well as the Newcastle University main campus.

=== Further ===
- Burnside College
- ESPA College
- Gateshead College
- Harton Academy and Sixth Form
- Newcastle College
- Newcastle Sixth Form College
- Tyne Metropolitan College
- South Tyneside College
- Sunderland College

== Places of interest ==
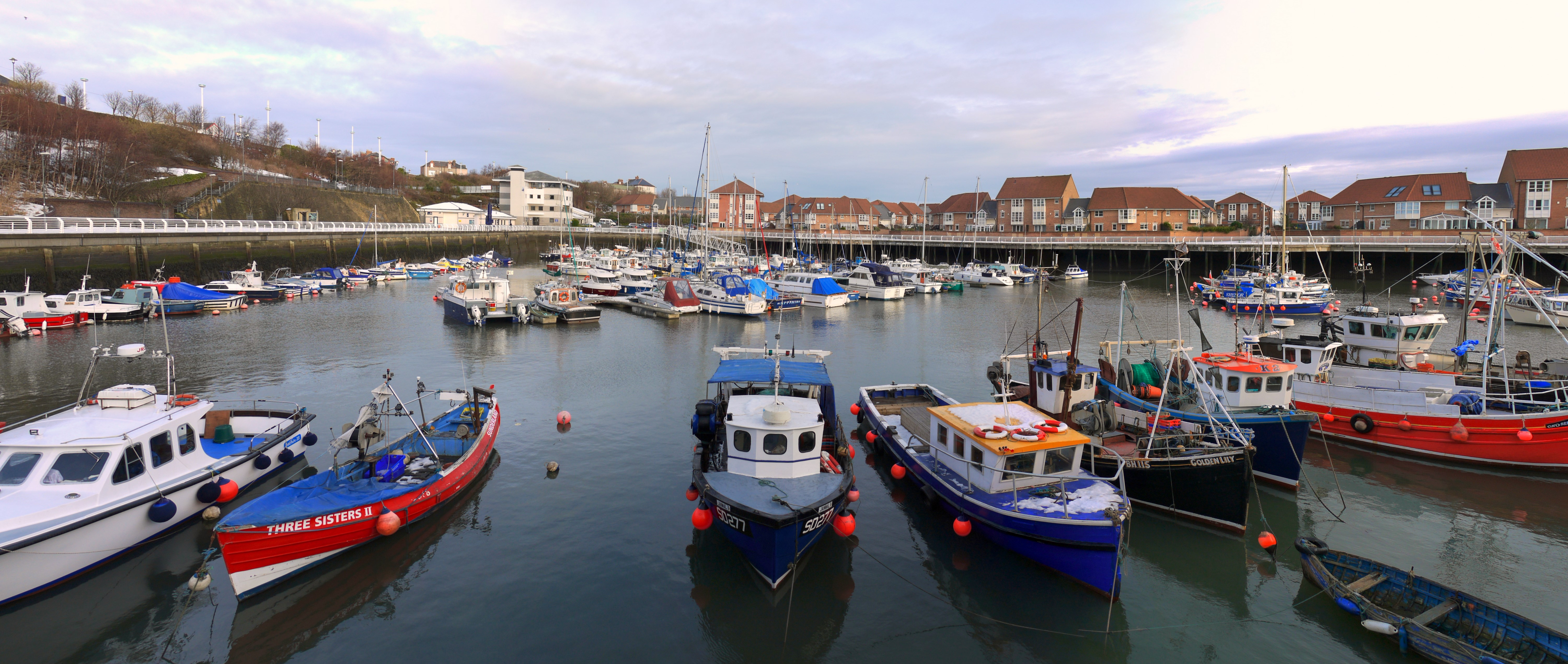
Sunderland Marina

Gateshead Millennium Bridge and BALTIC Art Centre

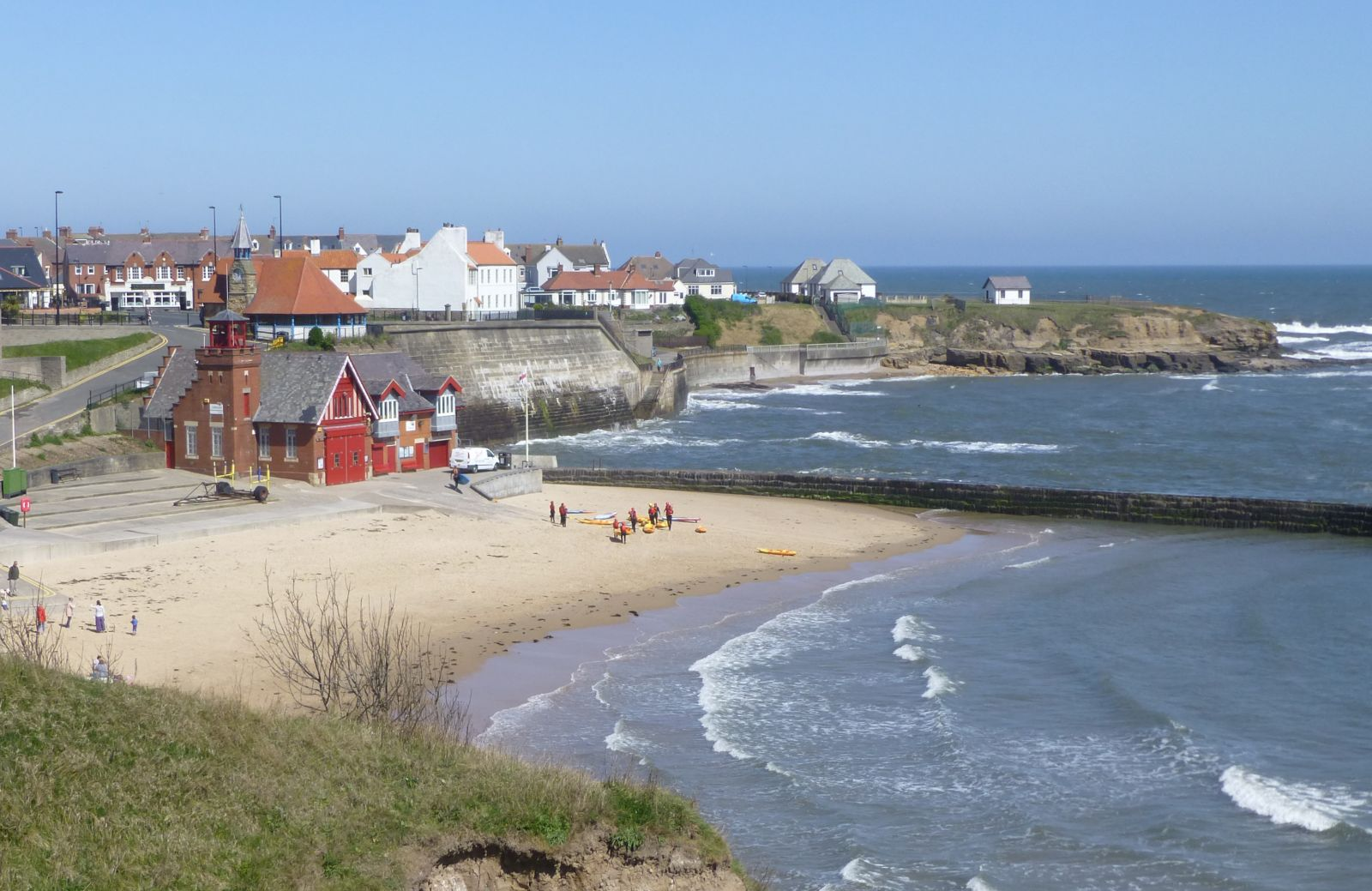
Cullercoats Bay

Key
	Abbey/Priory/Cathedral
Accessible open space	Accessible open space
	Amusement/Theme Park
	Castle
Country Park	Country Park
	English Heritage
	Forestry Commission
Heritage railway	Heritage railway
Historic house	Historic House
Places of Worship	Places of Worship
Museum (free) Museum	Museum (free/not free)
National Trust	National Trust
	Theatre
	Zoo

Gateshead

- Angel of the North
- BALTIC Centre for Contemporary Art
- Dunston Staiths
- Gateshead International Stadium
- Gibside –
- MetroCentre
- Saltwell Park –
- Shipley Art Gallery
- The Sage Gateshead

Joint Gateshead and other

- Beamish Museum (with County Durham) –
- Tanfield Railway, Sunniside (with County Durham) –
- Tyne Bridge (with Newcastle)
- Gateshead Millennium Bridge (with Newcastle)

Newcastle

- Discovery Museum –
- Hadrian's Wall –
- Great North Museum: Hancock –
- Jesmond Dene –
- Newcastle Castle Keep –
- St James' Park –
- Leazes Park –
- Centre for Life
- Town Moor –
- Tyneside cinema
- Chinatown, Newcastle
- Quayside
- Utilita Arena Newcastle
- Newcastle Cathedral –
- Laing Art Gallery
- Theatre Royal –
- Northumberland Street
- Grey Street
- Grey's Monument
- The Biscuit Factory

North Tyneside

- Rising Sun Country Park –
- Segedunum Roman Fort & Museum, Wallsend –
- Spanish City, Whitley Bay
- St Mary's Island bird reserve
- Tynemouth Castle and Priory –

South Tyneside

- Arbeia Roman Fort & Museum, South Shields –
- Marsden Rock bird reserve
- Souter Point Lighthouse –
- Bede's World, Jarrow

Sunderland

- The Museum and Winter Gardens –
- Mowbray Park –
- Seaburn and Roker Beaches
- Barnes Park –
- The National Glass
- Hylton Castle –
- Penshaw Monument –
- St. Peter's Church –
- Sunderland Minster –
- Stadium of Light
- Washington Old Hall –
- The Empire Theatre –
- Northern Gallery for Contemporary Art

=== Gallery ===
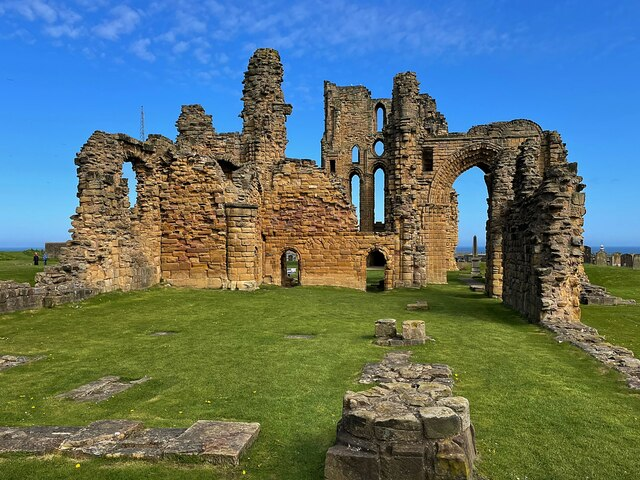
Tynemouth Priory

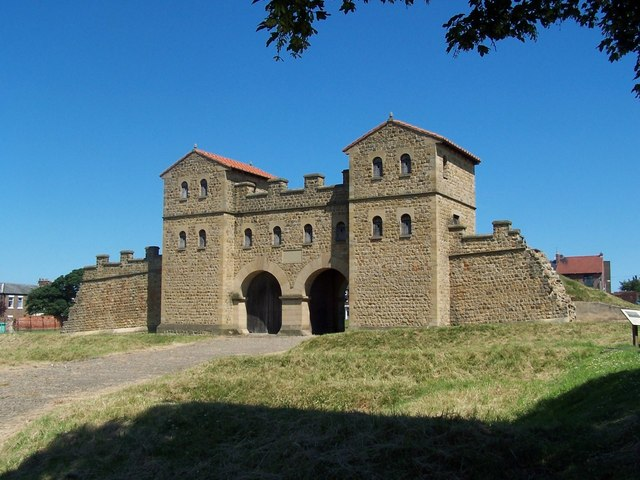
Arbeia Museum

Newcastle Keep

== Businesses ==
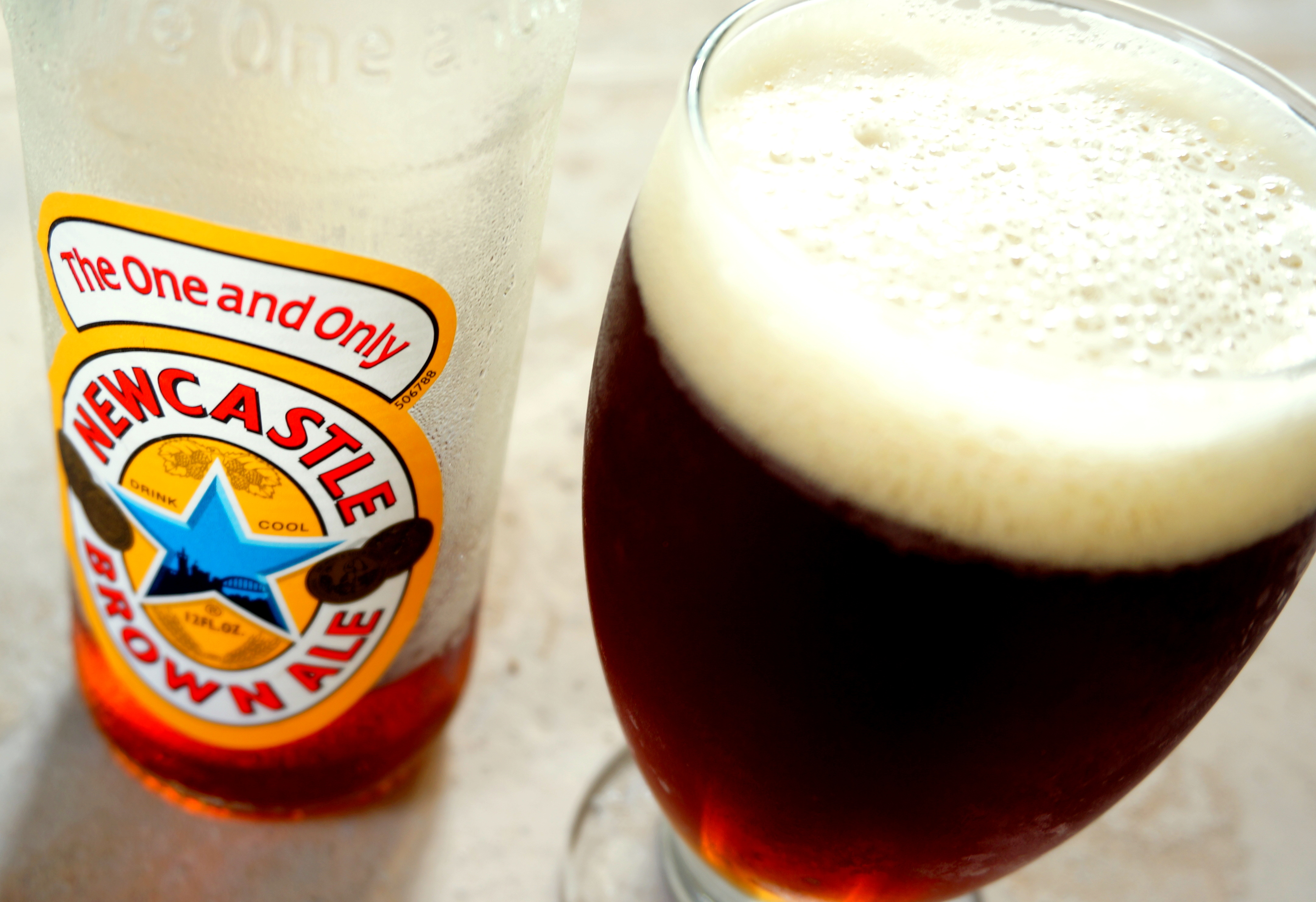
Newcastle Brown Ale – the yen an anny (which means "the one and only" in Tyneside dialect.)

Offshore Group Newcastle make oil platforms. Sage Group, who produce accounting software, are based at Hazlerigg at the northern end of the Newcastle bypass. Northern Rock, which became a bank in 1997 and was taken over by Virgin Money in November 2011, and the Newcastle Building Society are based in Gosforth. The Gosforth-based bakery Greggs now has over 1,500 shops. The Balliol Business Park in Longbenton contains Procter & Gamble research and global business centres and a tax credits call centre for HMRC, and is the former home of Findus UK. The Government National Insurance Contributions Office in Longbenton, demolished and replaced in 2000, had a 1 mile (1.6 km) long corridor.

Be-Ro and the Go-Ahead Group bus company are in central Newcastle. Nestlé use the former Rowntrees chocolate factory on the east of the A1. BAE Systems Land & Armaments in Scotswood, formerly Vickers-Armstrongs, is the main producer of British Army tanks such as the Challenger 2. A Rolls-Royce apprentice training site is next door. Siemens Energy Service Fossil make steam turbines at the CA Parsons Works in South Heaton. Sir Charles Parsons invented the steam turbine in 1884, and developed an important local company. Domestos, a product whose main ingredient is sodium hypochlorite, was originated in Newcastle in 1929 by William Handley, and was distributed from the area for many years.

Clarke Chapman is next to the A167 in Gateshead. The MetroCentre, the largest shopping centre in Europe, is in Dunston. Scottish & Newcastle was the largest UK-owned brewery until it was bought by Heineken and Carlsberg in April 2008, and produced Newcastle Brown Ale at the Newcastle Federation Brewery in Dunston until production moved to Tadcaster in September 2010. At Team Valley are De La Rue, with their largest banknote printing facility, and Myson Radiators, the second largest in the UK market. Petards make surveillance equipment including ANPR cameras, and its Joyce-Loebl division makes electronic warfare systems and countermeasure dispensing systems such as the AN/ALE-47. Sevcon, an international company formed from a part of Smith Electric, is a world leader in electric vehicle controls. AEI Cables and Komatsu UK construction equipment at Birtley.

J. Barbour & Sons make outdoor clothing in Simonside, Jarrow. SAFT Batteries make primary lithium batteries on the Tyne in South Shields. Bellway plc houses is in Seaton Burn in North Tyneside. Cobalt Business Park, the largest office park in the UK, is at Wallsend, on the former site of Atmel, and is the home of North Tyneside Council. Swan Hunter until 2006 made ships in Wallsend, and still designs ships. Soil Machine Dynamics in Wallsend on the Tyne makes Remotely operated underwater vehicles, and its Ultra Trencher 1 is the world's largest submersible robot.

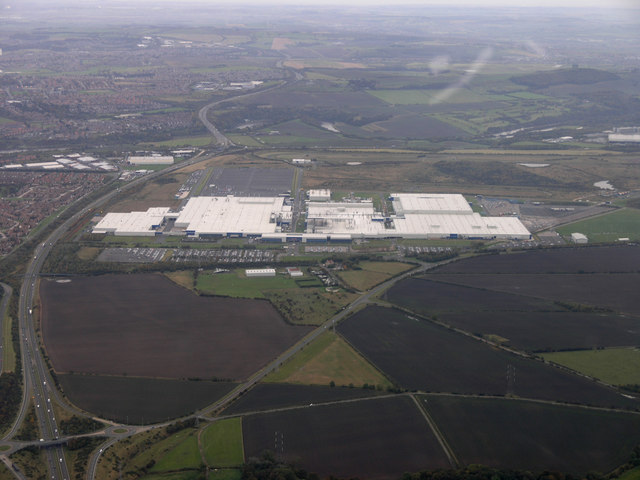
Nissan UK off the A19 near Sunderland

The car dealership Evans Halshaw is in Sunderland. The car factory owned by Nissan Motor Manufacturing UK between North Hylton and Washington is the largest in the UK. Grundfos, the world's leading pump manufacturer, builds pumps in Sunderland. Calsonic Kansei UK, formerly Magna, make automotive instrument panels and car trim at the Pennywell Industrial Estate. Gestamp UK make automotive components. Smith Electric Vehicles originated in Washington. The LG Electronics microwave oven factory opened in 1989, closed in May 2004, and later became the site of the Tanfield Group. Goodyear Dunlop had their only UK car tyre factory next to the Tanfield site until its 2006 closure. BAE Systems Global Combat Systems moved to a new £75 million factory at the former Goodyear site in 2011, where they make large calibre ammunition for tanks and artillery.

The government's child benefit office is in Washington. Liebherr build cranes next to the Wear at Deptford. The outdoor clothing company Berghaus is in Castletown. Vaux Breweries, who owned Swallow Hotels, closed in 1999. ScS Sofas are on Borough Road. There are many call centres in Sunderland, notably EDF Energy at the Doxford International Business Park, which is also the home of the headquarters of the large international transport company Arriva and Nike UK. Rolls-Royce planned to move their production of fan and turbine discs to BAE Systems' new site in 2016.

== Demography ==
Population of Tyne and Wear by district (2025)
District	Land area		Population		Density (/km^{2})
District	(km^{2})	(%)	People	(%)	Density (/km^{2})
Gateshead	142	26%	202,509	17%	1,423
Newcastle upon Tyne	113	21%	320,838	27%	2,828
North Tyneside	82	15%	215,401	18%	2,617
South Tyneside	64	12%	151,255	13%	2,348
Sunderland	137	25%	287,070	24%	2,089
Tyne and Wear	540	100%	1,177,073	100%	2,180

=== Ethnicity ===
Ethnic Group	Year					
Ethnic Group	1971 estimations		1981 estimates		1991 census	
Ethnic Group	Number	%	Number	%	Number	%
White: Total	–	99.6%	1,140,786	98.8%	1,109,420	98.1%
White: British	–	–	–	–	–	–
White: Irish	–	–	–	–	–	–
White: Gypsy or Irish Traveller	–	–	–	–	–	–
White: Roma	–	–	–	–	–	–
White: Other	–	–	–	–	–	–
Asian or Asian British: Total	–	–	10,591	0.9%	16,048	1.4%
Asian or Asian British: Indian	–	–	3,311		4,477	
Asian or Asian British: Pakistani	–	–	2,914		4,029	
Asian or Asian British: Bangladeshi	–	–	1,313		2,959	
Asian or Asian British: Chinese	–	–	1,995		2,867	
Asian or Asian British: Other Asian	–	–	1,058		1,716	
Black or Black British: Total	–	–	1,769		2,253	
Black or Black British: African	–	–	711		899	
Black or Black British: Caribbean	–	–	379		478	
Black or Black British: Other Black	–	–	679		876	
Mixed or British Mixed: Total	–	–	–	–	–	–
Mixed: White and Black Caribbean	–	–	–	–	–	–
Mixed: White and Black African	–	–	–	–	–	–
Mixed: White and Asian	–	–	–	–	–	–
Mixed: Other Mixed	–	–	–	–	–	–
Other: Total	–	–	1,956		2,679	
Other: Arab	–	–	–	–	–	–
Other: Any other ethnic group	–	–	–	–		
Non-White: Total	–	0.4%	14,314	1.2%	20,980	1.9%
Total	–	100%	1,155,100	100%	1,130,400	100%

== See also ==
- List of Lord Lieutenants of Tyne and Wear
- List of High Sheriffs of Tyne and Wear
- List of railway stations in Tyne and Wear
- Tyne–Wear derby
- Timeline of Newcastle upon Tyne
