= OGN =

OGN or Ogn may refer to:

- OGN (TV channel)
- Offshore Group Newcastle, a British engineering firm
- Ognøya, an island of Norway
- Open Glider Network
- Origin Pacific Airways, a New Zealand airline
- Oregon Geographic Names
- Original graphic novel
- Osteoglycin, encoded by the OGN gene
- Yonaguni Airport, in Okinawa Prefecture, Japan
