= Seaborn =

Seaborn is a given name and a surname. Notable persons with that name include:

== Persons with the given name ==
- Seaborn Buckalew, Jr. (1920–2017), American judge and politician
- Seaborn McDaniel Denson (1854–1936), American musician and singing teacher
- Seaborn Jones (1788–1864), American politician from Georgia
- Seaborn Jones (poet), (1942–2014), American poet
- Seaborn Reese (1846–1907), American politician, jurist and lawyer
- Seaborn Roddenbery (1870–1913), American politician from Georgia

== Persons with the surname ==
- J. Blair Seaborn (1924–2019}, a Canadian diplomat
- Jim Seaborn (1890–1964), Canadian ice hockey player
- Richard Seaborn (1917–1991), Canadian politician from Manitoba
- Robert Seaborn (1911–1993), Canadian bishop
- Rodney Seaborn (1912–2008), Australian psychiatrist and performing arts philanthropist

== Fictional characters ==
- Sam Seaborn, a fictional character portrayed by Rob Lowe on the television serial drama The West Wing

== Software ==
Seaborn (software), Python data visualization library based on matplotlib

== See also ==
- Seaborn Networks, a developer and operator of submarine communications cables
- Seaborne (disambiguation)
- Seabourn (disambiguation)
- Seabourne, a surname
- Seaburn, a seaside resort in England
