= Seaborne =

Seaborne may refer to:

== Companies ==
- Seaborne Airlines, a small airline in Puerto Rico
- Seaborne Freight, short-lived British ferry company
- Seaborne II, the official name of a McDonald's restaurant known as the McBarge

== People ==
- Danny Seaborne (born 1987), English footballer
- Pam Seaborne (1935–2021), British hurdler
- Seaborne Davies (1904–1984), Welsh law teacher and academic, member of parliament

== See also ==
- Seaborn, a surname and given name
- Seabourn (disambiguation)
- Seabourne, a surname
- Seaburn, a seaside resort in England
