= Seabourn (disambiguation) =

Seabourn may refer to:

- Seabourn Cruise Line, American cruise line
- Bert Seabourn (1931–2022), American expressionist painter

== See also ==
- Seaborn, a surname and given name
- Seaborne (disambiguation)
- Seabourne, a surname
- Seaburn, a seaside resort in England
