= Seabourne =

Seabourne is a surname. Notable people with the surname include:

- Barry Seabourne (born 1947), English rugby league player
- John Seabourne, British film editor (fl. 1930s–1950s)
- Peter Seabourne (born 1960), English contemporary classical composer

== See also ==
- Seaborn, a surname and given name
- Seaborne (disambiguation)
- Seabourn (disambiguation)
- Seaburn, a seaside resort in England
