= List of railway stations in Tyne and Wear =

This is a list of National Rail stations in the metropolitan county of Tyne and Wear by 2024/25 entries and exits. The area is also served by the light rail Tyne and Wear Metro.

Rank	Station	Area served	Metropolitan borough	Operator	Line(s)	Platforms	Passenger usage 2016/17	Passenger usage 2024/25	Image
1	Newcastle	Newcastle upon Tyne	City of Newcastle upon Tyne	London North Eastern Railway	East Coast Main Line, Durham Coast Line, Tyne Valley Line, and Northumberland Line	12	8,426,644	10,548,216	
2	Sunderland	Sunderland	City of Sunderland	Northern	Durham Coast Line	2 (+2 Metro platforms)	483,836	709,098	
3	MetroCentre	intu Metrocentre	Gateshead	Northern	Tyne Valley Line	2	350,376	632,322	
4	Blaydon	Blaydon-on-Tyne	Gateshead	Northern	Tyne Valley Line	2	15,128	69,496	
5	Manors	Eastern Newcastle upon Tyne	City of Newcastle upon Tyne	Northern	East Coast Main Line	2	9,404	63,914	
6	Dunston	Dunston	Gateshead	Northern	Tyne Valley Line	2	10,618	50,828	
7	Heworth	Heworth	Gateshead	Northern	Durham Coast Line	2	20,784	45,528	
8	Northumberland Park	Northumberland Park	North Tyneside	Northern	Northumberland Line	1	N/A	N/A	

== See also ==
- List of Tyne and Wear Metro stations
- List of United Kingdom railway stations
