= Fulwell, Sunderland =

Coordinates: 54.928°N 1.383°W

Fulwell
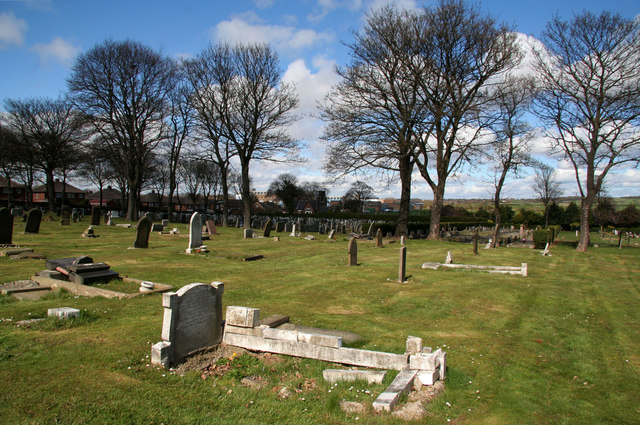
- Mere Knolls Cemetery

- Location within Tyne and Wear
- Population: 11,604 (2011.Ward)
- OS grid reference: NZ3959
- Metropolitan borough: Sunderland
- Metropolitan county: Tyne and Wear
- Region: North East
- Country: England
- Sovereign state: United Kingdom
- Post town: SUNDERLAND
- Postcode district: SR5, SR6
- Dialling code: 0191
- Police: Northumbria
- Fire: Tyne and Wear
- Ambulance: North East
- UK Parliament: Sunderland Central

Fulwell is an affluent area and former civil parish in the Sunderland district, in the county of Tyne and Wear, England. The parish was abolished in 1928 as a result of the Sunderland Corporation Act 1927, and the area incorporated into the former County Borough of Sunderland. It borders Seaburn, Southwick, Monkwearmouth, and Roker, and the district border between Sunderland and South Tyneside. Fulwell ward, including South Bents and Seaburn, is the least socially deprived of the city's 25 wards. Until 1974 it was in County Durham.

Housing in the area is varied. A network of streets in the southern area of Fulwell contains many nineteenth-century terraced houses, with a large amount of Victorian architecture. In the northern part of Fulwell, housing consists mostly of semi-detached, inter- and post-war dwellings, with many of the most popular streets constructed in the 1930s. House prices, particularly in the area's eastern and western edges, bordering Seaburn and Newcastle Road respectively, are amongst the highest in the city.

Due to Fulwell's role as an overwhelmingly residential area, economic activity in the ward is mostly restricted to the retail and leisure sectors. Local services centre on the main thoroughfare of Sea Road, where a large shopping parade has been established for many years. A mid-sized Sainsbury's store opened in 2006 at Station Road. Fulwell's fire station closed in September 2015, when services were transferred to the new station at Marley Pots. Other services include a Community Library, which is open 10 am until 4 pm on Mondays, 10 am until 5 pm on Wednesdays, 10 am until 4 pm on Fridays and 10 am until 1 pm on Saturdays, a GP clinic, two dental surgeries, and a veterinary surgery. The area is served by local bus services 23, 99, E2 and E6 as well as by the Tyne and Wear Metro, at Seaburn station. Mainline trains no longer stop at the station.

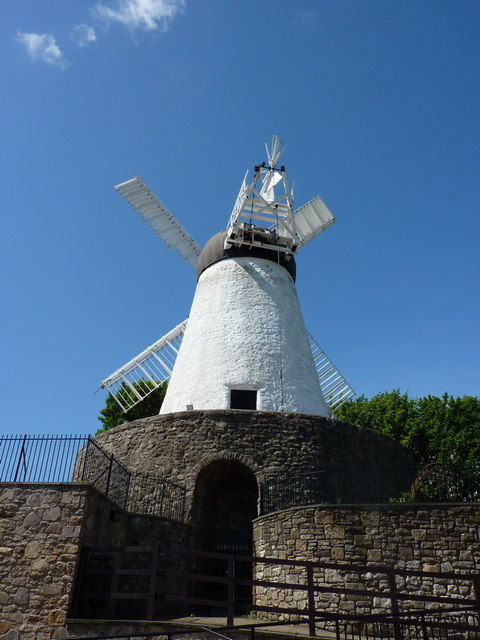
Fulwell mill, showing stone base/reefing stage.

Fulwell was primarily a farming village until it became part of the urban sprawl of industrial Sunderland in the nineteenth century. Relics of this agricultural past still survive in the form of three windmills, including the 19th century Fulwell Mill, the only working windmill in the United Kingdom featuring a stone reefing stage (a design-feature peculiar to mills in north-east England, equivalent to the gallery found on other mills). The mill, built in 1808, was restored to working order between 1996 and 2001 after over half-a-century out of use, and celebrated its bicentenary in 2008. In late 2011, however, the sails and cap suffered severe storm damage. A further restoration, which included the fitting of a new fantail, cap and sails to the original dimensions, together with an overhaul of associated machinery commenced during 2017 and was completed in May 2018.

Politically, Fulwell had long been regarded as a staunch Conservative ward in a region of traditional Labour strength. From the ward's creation until 2026 it had always had at least one Conservative council. Between 2021 and 2024 the ward was a Liberal Democrat- Conservative marginal. In the 2026 local elections, the ward returned 3 Liberal Democrat councillors, with Reform UK coming second and the Conservatives coming third.

Fulwell was formerly a township in the parish of Monk-Wearmouth, in 1866 Fulwell became a separate civil parish, on 1 April 1928 the parish was abolished and merged with Sunderland. In 1921 the parish had a population of 5862. It is now in the unparished area of Sunderland.
