= Sunderland International Airshow =

Annual airshow in UK (1989–2019)

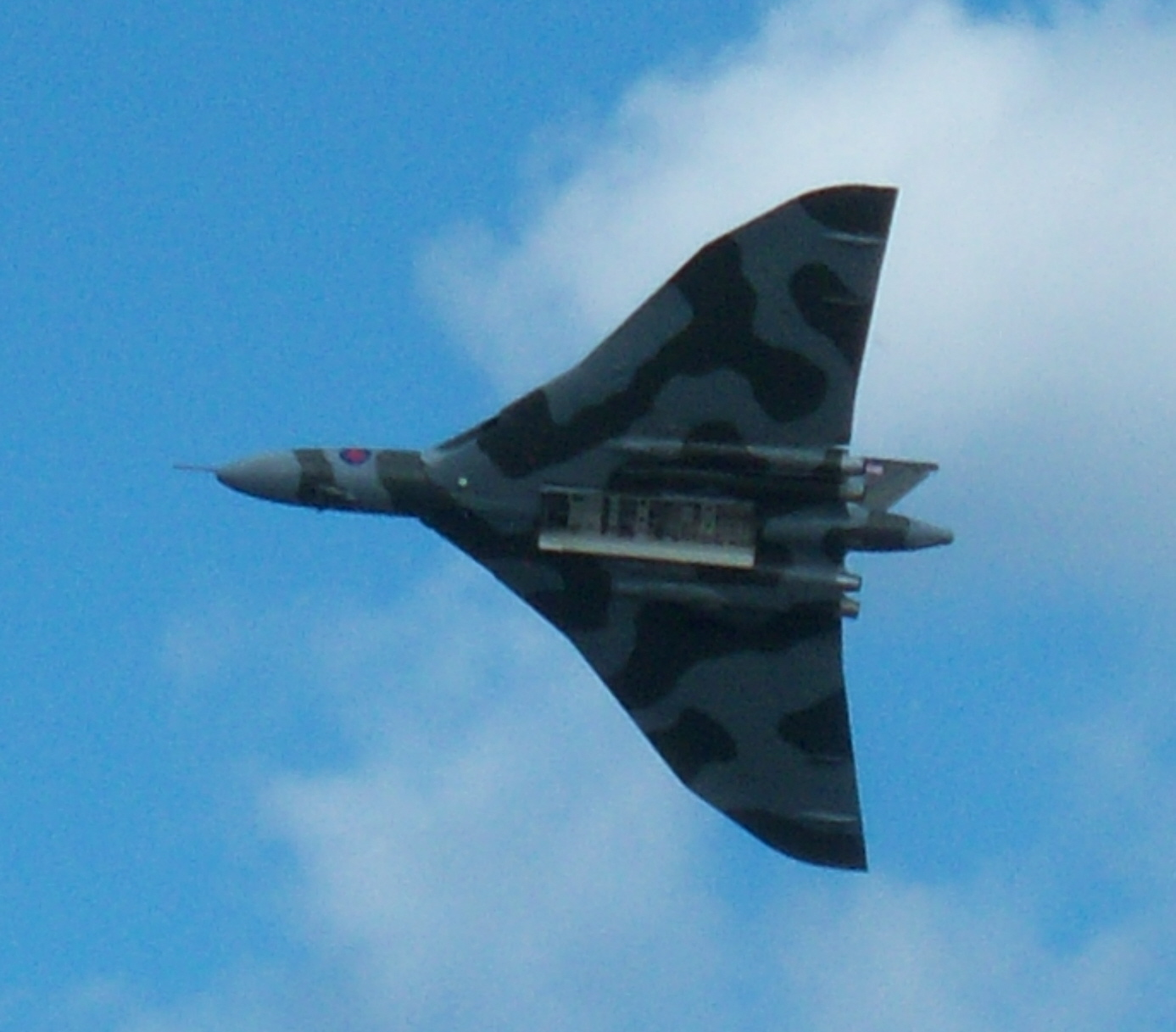
- Avro Vulcan XH558, the last flying Vulcan Bomber, makes its first appearance at the Sunderland Airshow on 25 July 2009
- Status: Defunct
- Genre: Air show
- Dates: July
- Frequency: Annual
- Locations: Sunderland, England
- Coordinates: 54.929°N 1.364°W
- Country: United Kingdom
- Established: 7 August 1989; 37 years ago
- Most recent: July 2019; 7 years ago
- Attendance: Over 1 million (over a two-day period)
- Organiser: Sunderland City Council
- Website: www.sunderlandinternationalairshow.co.uk

The Sunderland International Airshow was the biggest free annual airshow in Europe, held at the Roker and Seaburn seafronts. It took place over the course of three days, usually the final weekend in July (Friday to Sunday), and attracted hundreds of thousands of spectators every year. The airshow featured a large number of planes, including the Red Arrows and the Eurofighter Typhoon. In addition to the planes, the seafront played host to a range of food counters, stalls and fairground games. The Royal Navy traditionally had a warship off the coast every year, usually HMS Ocean, the adopted warship of Sunderland, however in 2007, HMS Albion made an appearance instead as HMS Ocean had other commitments.

== History ==
The airshow was first held on 7 August 1989 as a single-day show, and was planned to be a one-off event, when it attracted 250,000 spectators. Due to its success, from 1991 it became a two-day show, and subsequently three days. The Red Arrows first appeared in 1991, and the Concorde took part in 1993. It included teams from around the world, including Russia, Hungary, Jordan, America, France, Belgium, and the Netherlands. In 1995, the show's attendance reached one million.

Due to thick fog and mist in 2008, the airshow was cancelled.

Some aviation fans stayed the whole weekend. The Friday night launch, which started back in 2010, shows sunset displays for the majority of the night, but the night is rounded off with gliders with sparklers (used in fireworks) during the "settling down" period, and then a large firework display ends it all.

The show was cancelled in 2020, 2021, and 2022 because of the COVID-19 pandemic, and Sunderland City Council announced in October 2022 that it has "no plans" to hold the airshow again, citing the "global climate emergency" and the city’s desire to be carbon neutral by 2040.

== Affiliations ==
Newcastle International Airport was used as the main base for the displaying aircraft up until 2007 and again from 2014 as Teesside International Airport (the interim base for all but the more prestigious displaying aircraft 2007–14) was going into decline, and as well it seemed right to depart from Newcastle Airport, as they were an official sponsor of the event.

== The Green Airshow ==
In 2007 Sunderland City Council teamed up with Gentoo and CarbonNeutral North East to reduce and offset all the emissions caused by staging the two-day show. There was a Green Village with many environmental stalls.

== Highlights ==
The show had many highlights over the years, including:

- Red Arrows
- Eurofighter Typhoon
- Black Cats (Royal Navy)
- Harrier GR9
- The Blades (aerobatic team)
- F-16
- The Battle of Britain Memorial Flight
- The RAF Falcons
- Royal Marines Role Demo – 6 Assault Squadron
- RAF Chinook Display Team – Personnel from 18 and 27 Squadrons
- Eastern Airways BAe Jetstream 41 North East England Livery
- Catalina

== Gallery ==
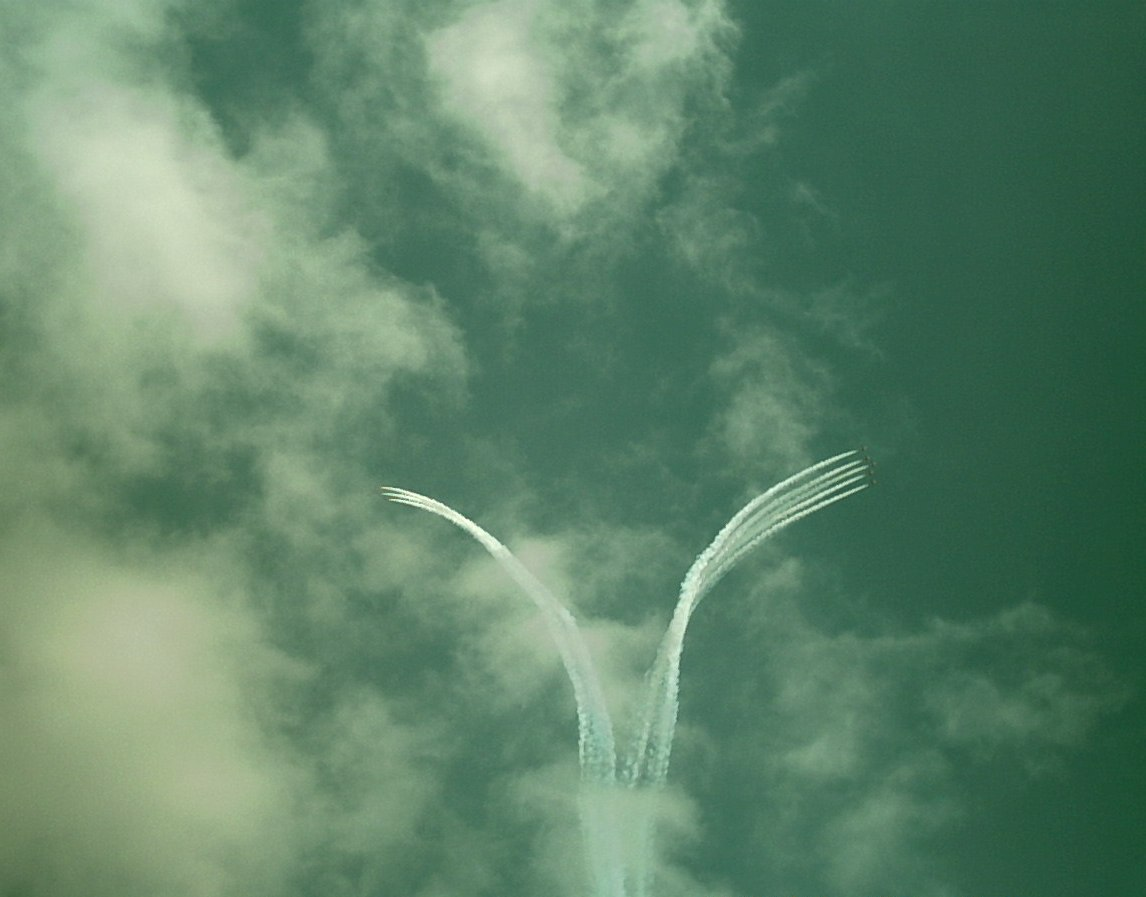
The Red Arrows At Sunderland International Airshow in 2005.

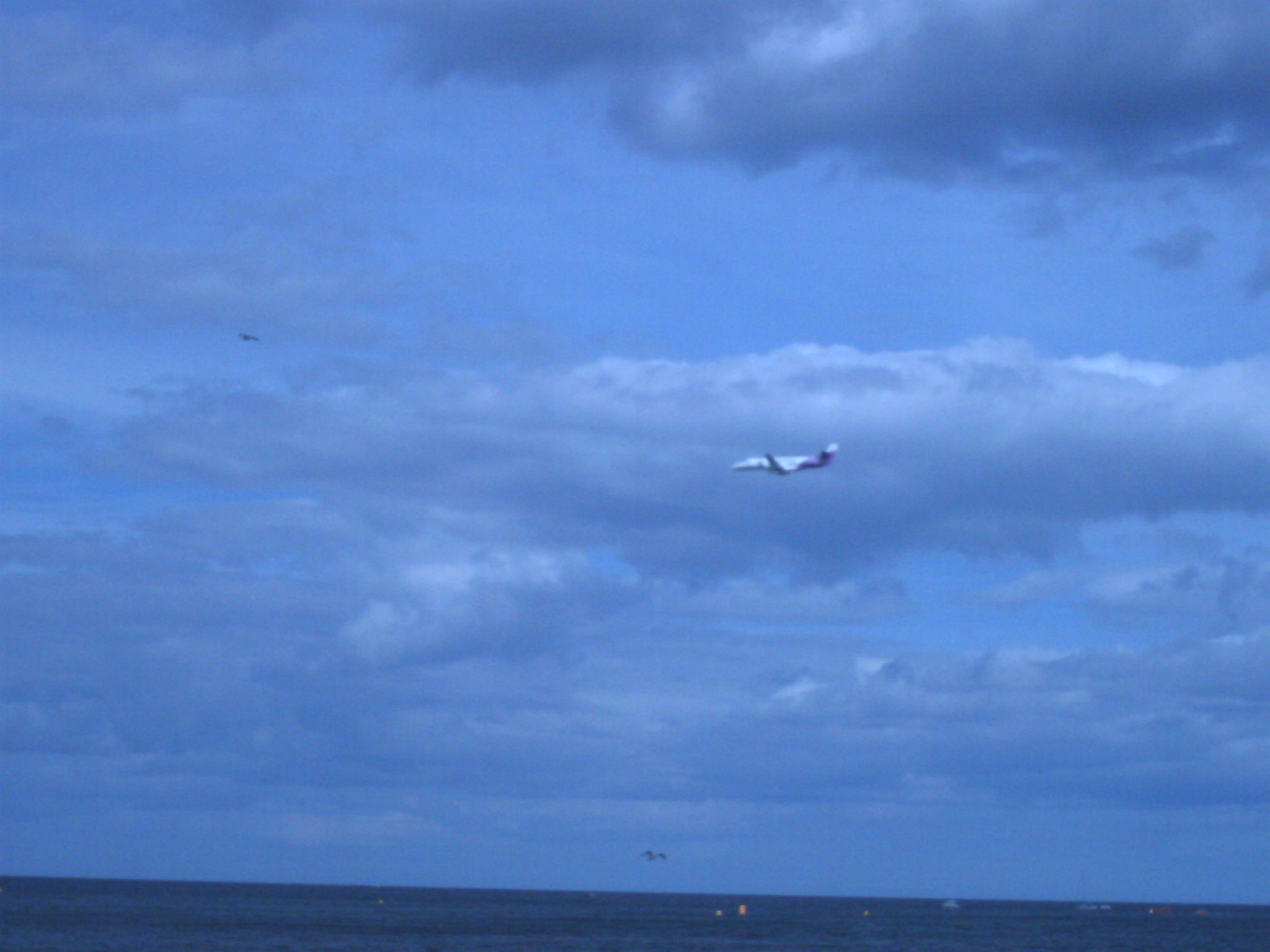
Eastern Airways BAe Jetstream 41 In One Northeast Livery.

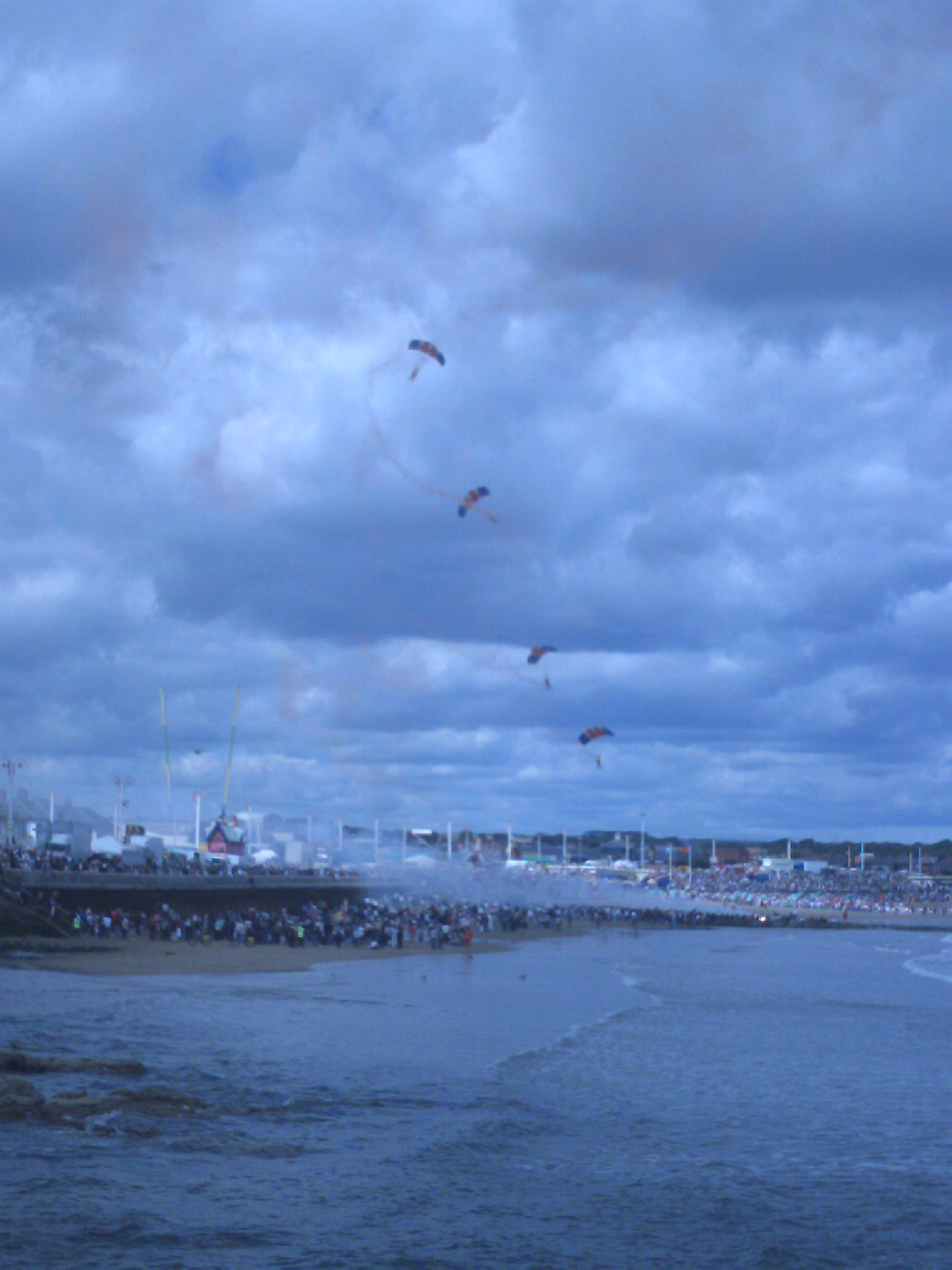
The RAF Falcons landing at the Sunderland Airshow 2007.

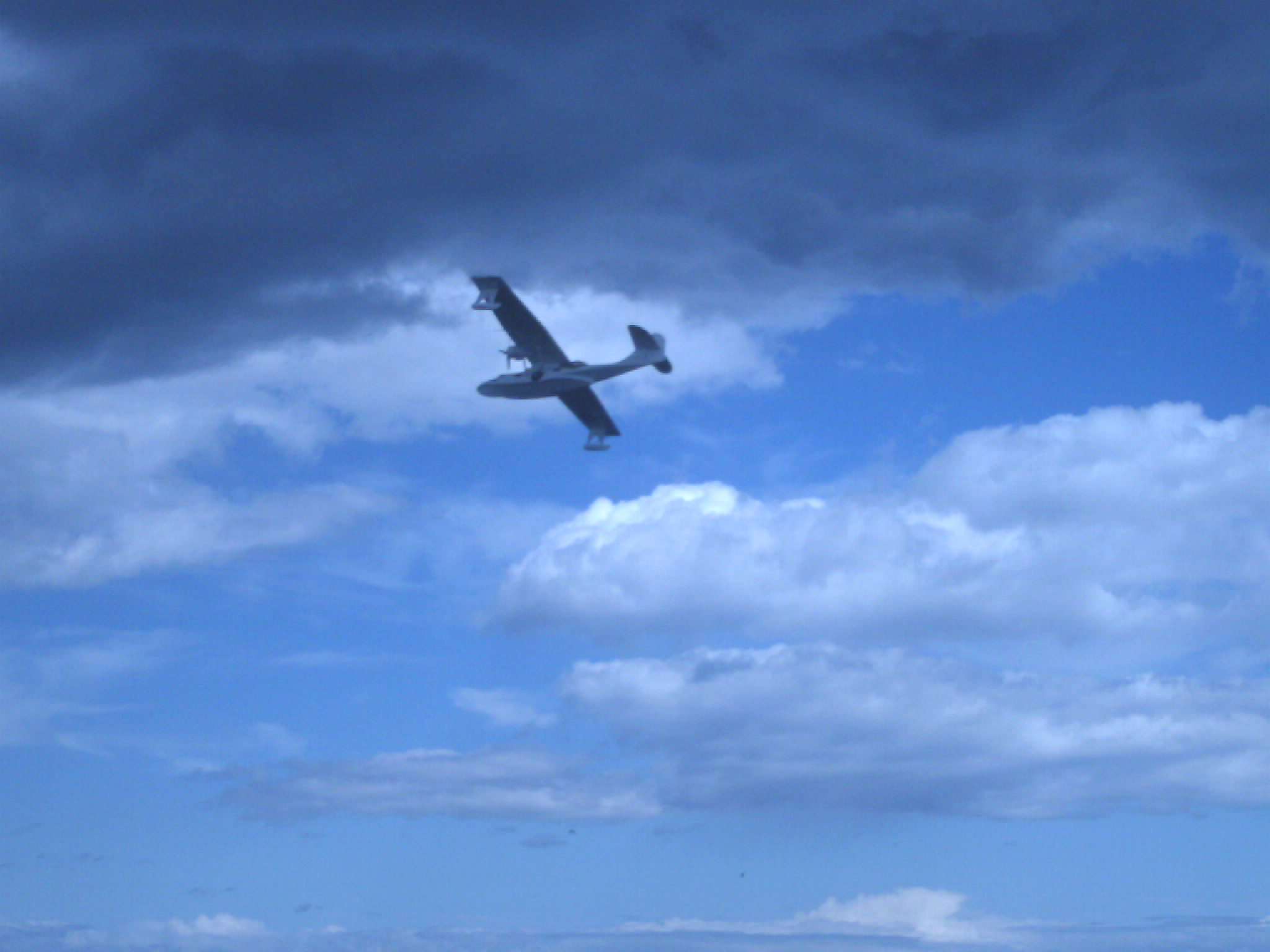
Catalina G-PBYA At the Sunderland Airshow 2007 with floats down ready for a water landing.

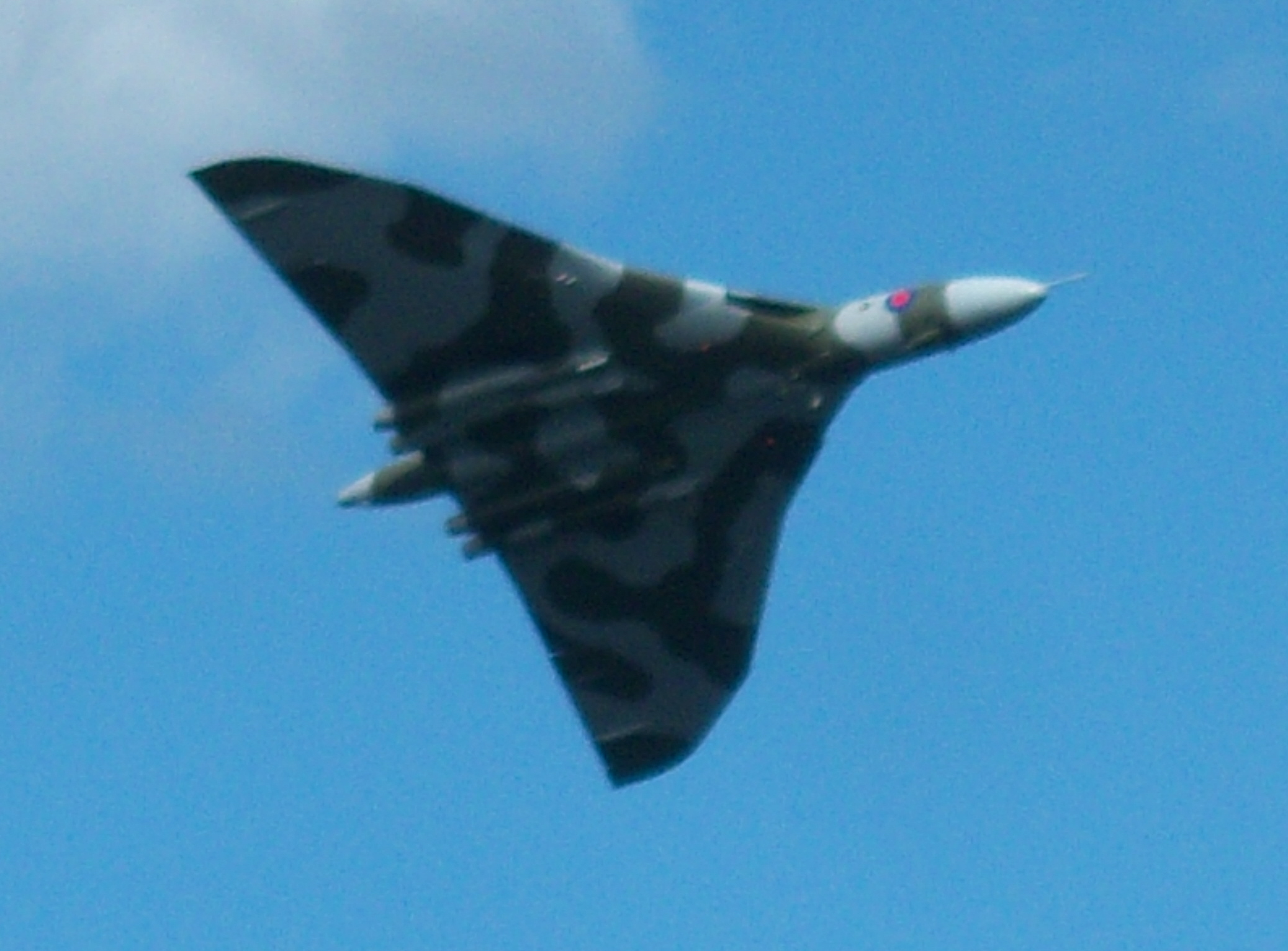
Vulcan at Sunderland in 2009

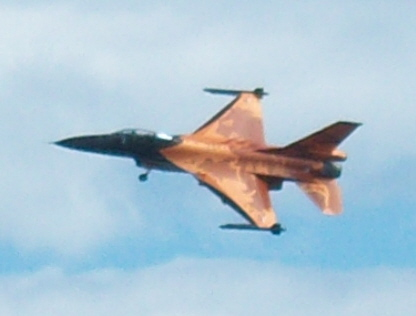
F-16 at Sunderland in 2009

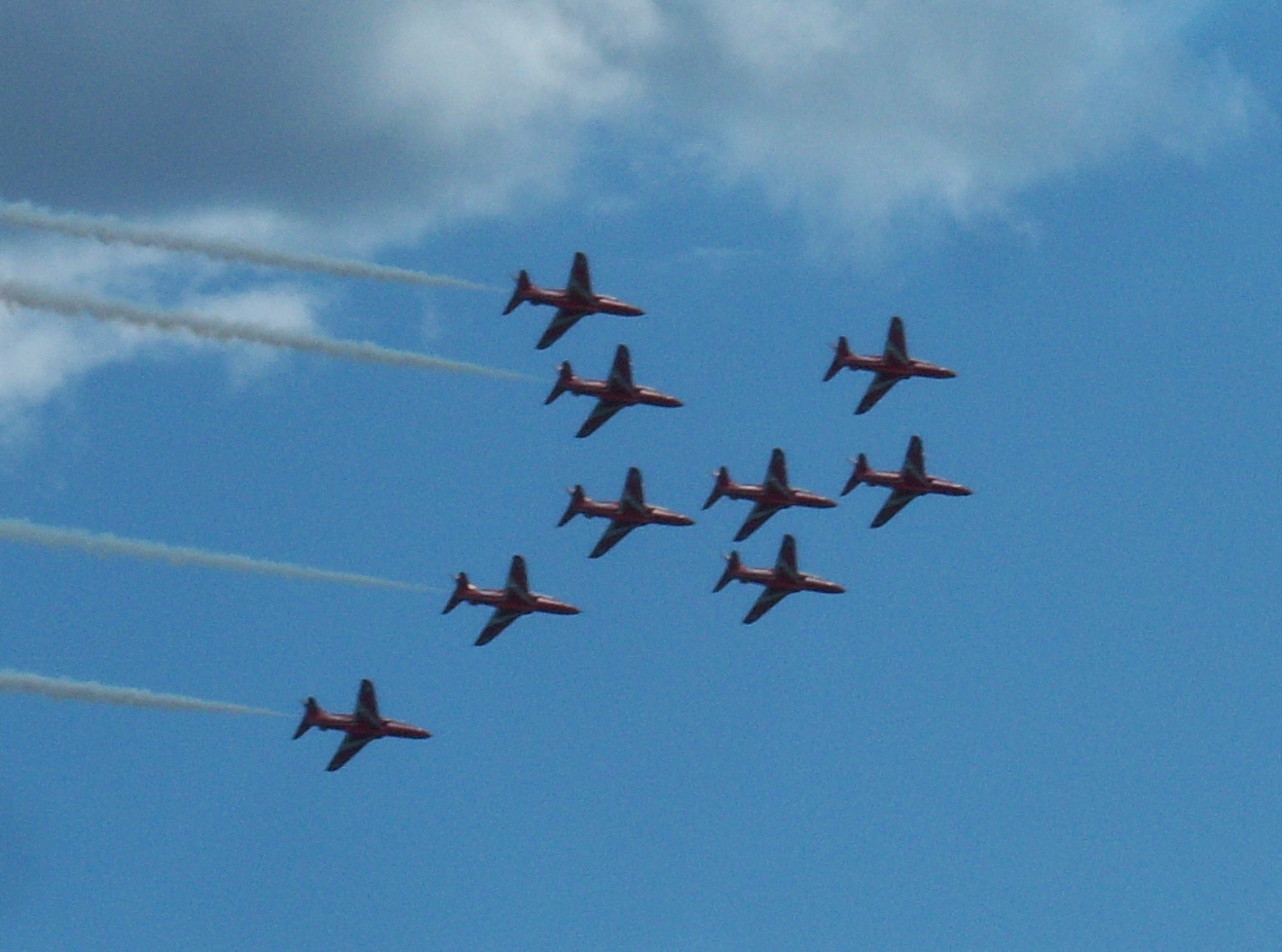
Red Arrows at Sunderland in 2009
