= Roker =

Area of Sunderland, Tyne and Wear, England

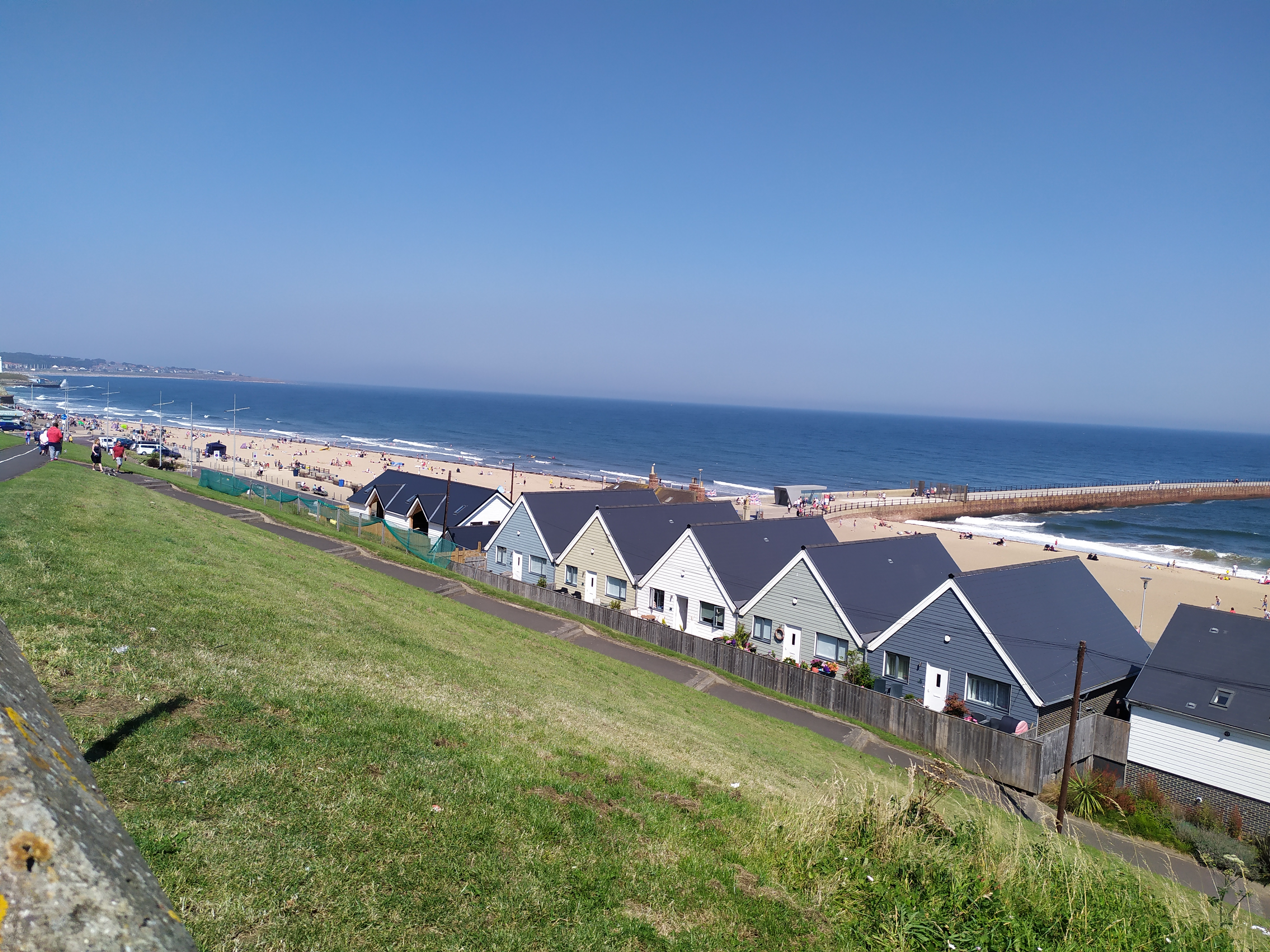
- Roker Beach and Promenade, June 2020

- Location within Tyne and Wear
- Population: 4,600
- OS grid reference: NZ405595
- Metropolitan borough: City of Sunderland
- Metropolitan county: Tyne and Wear
- Region: North East
- Country: England
- Sovereign state: United Kingdom
- Post town: SUNDERLAND
- Postcode district: SR6
- Dialling code: 0191
- Police: Northumbria
- Fire: Tyne and Wear
- Ambulance: North East
- UK Parliament: Sunderland Central

Roker (/ˈroʊkər/ ROH-kər) is a seaside resort in Sunderland, city of Sunderland district, Tyne and Wear. England. It is located north of the River Wear and Monkwearmouth, east of the southern part of Fulwell with the coastal resort of Seaburn to its north. It lies within historic County Durham.

The majority of the houses in Roker are terraced or semi-detached. Further west, to the part bordering Fulwell, are cul-de-sacs with semi-detached bungalows; these are owned mainly by members of Roker's sizeable elderly population. On the seafront, located on Roker Terrace, are apartments, guest houses and the Roker Hotel.

In addition to Seaburn seafront, the coast at Roker seafront played host to Sunderland International Airshow, the biggest free air show in Europe; this took place annually, usually over the last weekend in July. However, it was cancelled indefinitely as Sunderland City Council claimed it did not align with their vision to make the city carbon neutral. The popular event, which attracted hundreds of thousands of spectators to Roker, was last held in 2019, just before the COVID-19 pandemic.

== Toponymy ==
The name was first recorded as Roca in 1768. The exact origin of the name is unclear, but it may be a transferred name from Cabo da Roca in Sinatra, Portugal.

== History ==
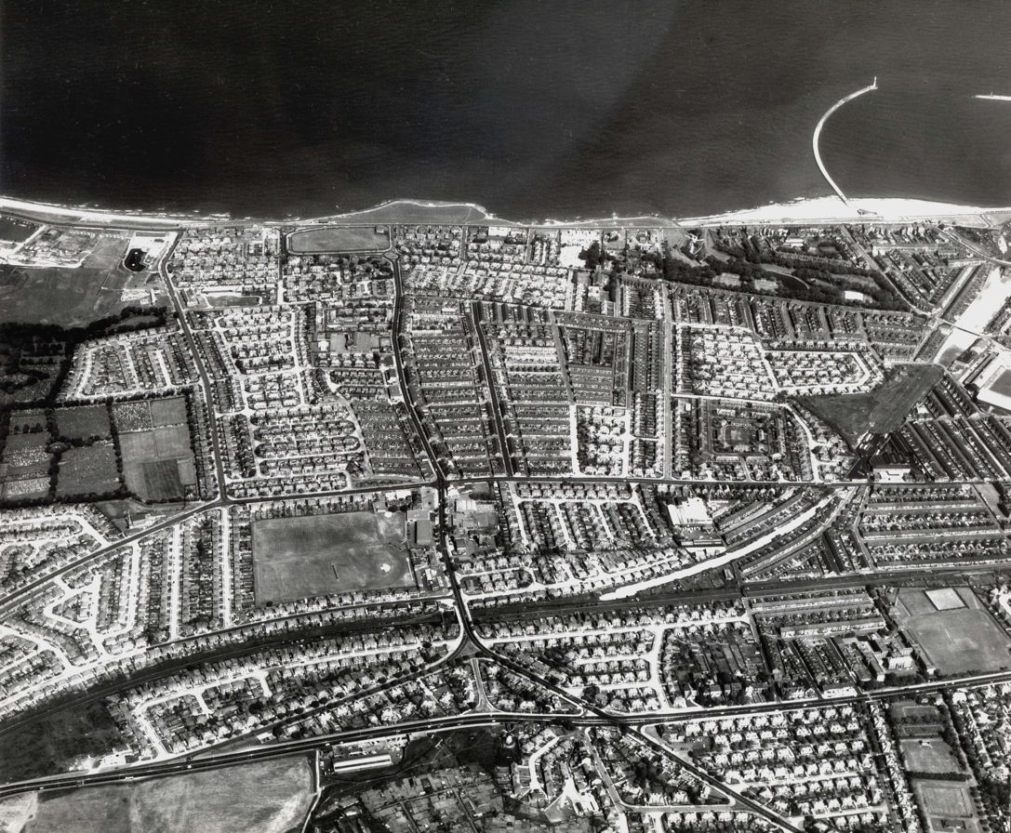
Roker and Seaburn, 1970

The story of Roker began in 1587, when the Abbs family were granted land on the north side of the River Wear on the condition that they provided six soldiers to defend the mouth of the river. Fast forward to 1840, when Roker Terrace was built upon the cliff tops, along with Monkwearmouth baths and Roker Park soon after. The pier and lower promenade were built six years later.

In 1898, Roker Park Stadium was built and Roker became known worldwide for being home to Sunderland A.F.C. It was used for ninety-nine years until 1997, when the club moved nearby to the Stadium of Light.

In the early 20th century, Roker became a hugely popular resort for locals and tourists alike, and in 1928 it was taken over by the Borough of Sunderland, along with Fulwell and Seaburn.

In 1995, Roker Park Conservation Area was declared.

== Landmarks ==
St Andrew's Church, built 1905–07, is recognised as one of the finest churches of the first half of the twentieth century and the masterpiece of Edward Schroeder Prior.

One well-known landmark of sorts in Roker is the Bungalow Cafe, which is an old-fashioned café in a tiny bungalow on the upper promenade. Also famous is the signpost next to the café, marked: "To Beach" (pointing towards the beach), "To Village" (pointing into Roker), "To Bungalow" (pointing to the cafe) and "To Germany" (pointing out to sea).

A museum is located in the Roker Watch House, which was originally opened in 1906 as the headquarters of the Roker Volunteer Life Brigade. It is open every Sunday afternoon and on Bank Holiday Mondays.

Other nearby landmarks are the statue of Bede's cross, on the cliff top near Roker Park, and St Peter's Church, Monkwearmouth. The cross recognises the work of the Venerable Bede, who worked in the North-East all his life at the twin monasteries of Wearmouth and Jarrow. There is bid for the twin monasteries to gain World Heritage Site status.

=== Lighthouses and pier ===
From 1717, the newly formed River Wear Commission began to improve the harbour entrance at the mouth of the Wear. By 1750, a pair of breakwaters had been built, which survive in truncated form as the 'Old' North and South Piers.

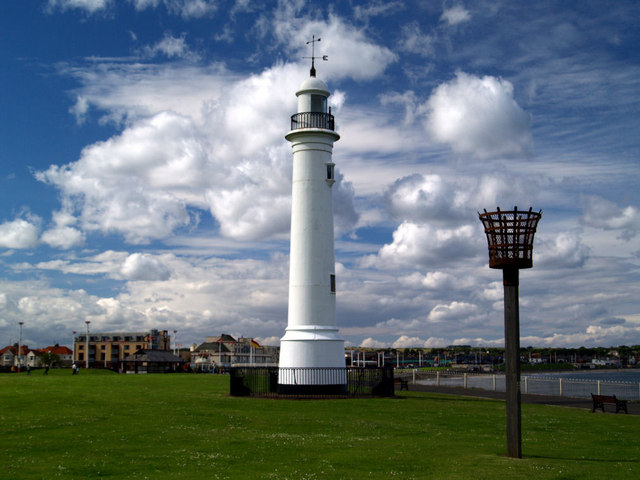
The Old South Pier lighthouse was moved to Roker Cliff Park in 1983.

By the beginning of the next century, each had a lighthouse at its end. The lighthouse which stands today in Roker Cliff Park originally stood on the Old South Pier. Designed by Thomas Meik, it was installed on the pier in 1856; having been deactivated in 1903, it stayed in place for another eighty years before being moved up to the seafront. Its counterpart on the Old North Pier, which dated from 1802, was a 60-foot (18 m) high masonry tower lit by coal gas. In the 1830s the piers were reconfigured and extended eastwards, and in 1841 civil engineer John Murray ingeniously moved the Old North Pier lighthouse 158 yards (144 m) to its new location, in one piece, keeping it lit by night. There it continued in service until 1902, when it was demolished (as was most of the Old North Pier itself a few years later).

Roker Pier (the 'New' North Pier)

With the growth of Sunderland as a port, it was decided to improve the approach to the river by creating an outer harbour, protected by a new pair of new breakwaters curving out into the North Sea from the shore on each side. The new piers were the brainchild of Henry Hay Wake, who at the age of 25 had been appointed Chief Engineer to the River Wear Commission, in succession to Thomas Meik in 1868. The foundation stone for the New North Pier (Roker Pier) was laid on 14 September 1885. Applauded at the time as a triumph of engineering, the 1,198 ft (365 m) pier is built of granite-faced concrete blocks, which were loaded onto wagons at River Weir Works by a Goliath crane and unloaded and placed at the end of the pier by a Titan crane.

The opposite New South Pier was begun at around the same time, but never fully completed due to the start of the First World War; the twin lighthouse planned for its end was never built.

==== Roker Pier Lighthouse ====
Roker Pier lighthouse
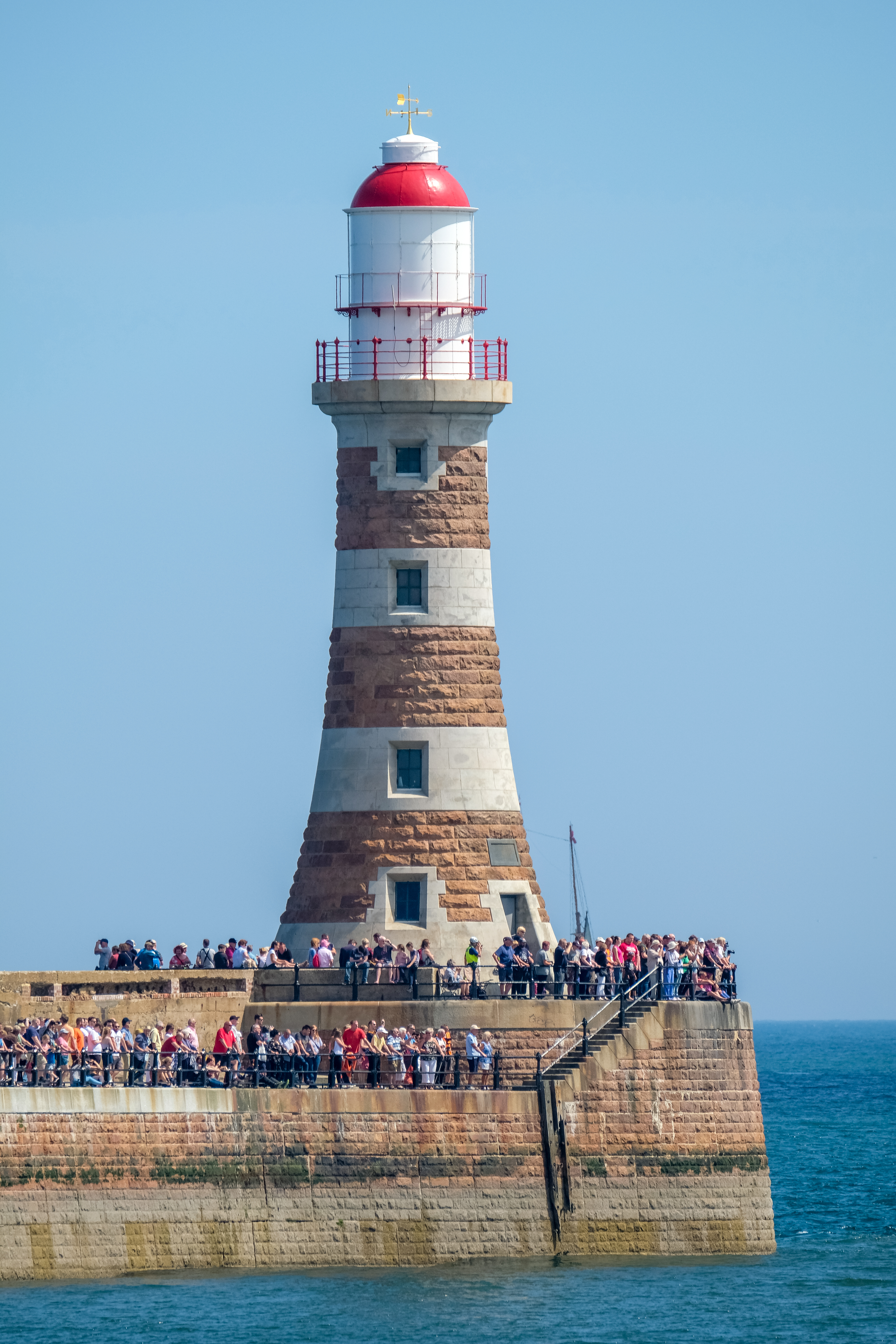
- Location: Roker, City of Sunderland, United Kingdom
- Coordinates: 54.921263°N 1.352550°W

Tower
- Constructed: 1903
- Construction: white and red granite tower
- Height: 23 metres (75 ft)
- Shape: tapered cylindrical tower with balcony and lantern
- Markings: white and red band tower, white lantern room, black lantern roof
- Operator: Port of Sunderland

Listed Building – Grade II
- Official name: Roker Pier and Lighthouse with Railings, Lamp Standards and part of Promenade
- Designated: 17 October 1994
- Reference no.: 1279906
- Heritage: Grade II listed building
- Fog signal: 1 blast every 20s.

Light
- Focal height: 25 metres (82 ft)
- Lens: 3rd order rotating catadioptric (1903-1972)
- Light source: LED (2013-present)
- Range: 23 nmi (43 km; 26 mi)
- Characteristic: Fl W 20s

The lighthouse at the pier head was completed in 1903. Its distinctive stripes are of naturally coloured red and white Aberdeen granite. When built, it was said to be Britain's most powerful port lighthouse. Equipped with a third-order rotating catadioptric optic (consisting of a single-panel Fresnel lens backed by a prismatic mirror), it displayed a single flash every five seconds. The lighthouse had initially been lit by gas from the town mains, like its predecessors, but the supply to the end of the pier was found to be intermittent; as a result, the gas light was soon replaced by a Chance Brothers incandescent petroleum vapour mantle lamp. This increased the effective intensity of the light from 40,000 to 150,000 candle power, to give it a range of 15 nautical miles (28 km; 17 mi).

A fog siren was also provided, powered by compressed air from a pair of 7-horsepower gas engines located in the basement. It gave a two-second blast every twenty seconds in foggy weather from a sounder on the parapet, which was regulated by clockwork.

The light was semi-automated in 1936, when a new light system was installed by AGA. The main lamp was a 750-watt incandescent light bulb, with a gas mantle lamp (fed from the town supply) provided as a stand-by, activated by an automatic lamp changer; a small electric motor automatically wound the clockwork which rotated the lens.

Full automation followed in 1972, when the old optic was replaced by two back-to-back arrays of six sealed beam units mounted on an AGA gearless rotating pedestal, to give the light an increased range of 23 nautical miles (43 km; 26 mi); a new fog horn was also provided at the same time. The system was supervised remotely from the Pilot House on the Old North Pier. Subsequent to its removal, the 1903 optic was added to the maritime collection of Sunderland Museum and Art Gallery.

In 2007, the lighting system was again replaced with a dual-drive Pelangi PRL400 rotating pedestal and lamp.

Roker Pier Lighthouse still functions today. Both pier and lighthouse have undergone significant refurbishment in recent years. In 2012, as part of the restoration, a new flashing LED lamp array was installed, replacing the small Pelangi unit previously in use.

In 2018, following a comprehensive six-year process of refurbishment, the lighthouse was opened to the public for the first time; regular guided tours took place, with access provided by way of the tunnel which runs the length of the pier. In October 2023, however, the structure of the pier was damaged by the high winds and heavy seas of Storm Babet; repairs were due to take place in 2025.

The lighthouse was featured in the design of Sunderland A.F.C.'s away kit for the 2025–26 season.

== Transport ==
Roker is served by Tyne and Wear Metro's Green line; Stadium of Light metro station facilitates regular services between Airport, Newcastle Central, Gateshead Interchange, Sunderland and South Hylton.

Bus services are operated primarily by Stagecoach North East and Go North East, with routes linking the area with Sunderland and South Shields.

== Demographics ==
The population of Roker is approximately 4,600. Since the redevelopment of former brownfield areas of heavy industry into affluent riverside housing areas, and the founding of the St Peters Campus of the University of Sunderland to the immediate south of the area, Roker has undergone rapid demographic change. The first of these two changes brought a large influx of professional and managerial workers into the areas now known as St Peters Riverside and North Haven. The arrival of the university campus has seen a large number of the larger houses in the vicinity of Roker Avenue being converted into flats and student residences. The pursuant studentification has brought a substantial Chinese community into the area for the first time, along with a variety of other nationalities.

Along with the district of Monkwearmouth, Roker forms the St Peter's electoral ward on Sunderland City Council, which is a division of the Sunderland Central parliamentary seat. St Peter's was a safe Conservative ward in the 1980s, but became a battleground between the Conservatives and Labour in the 1990s and has remained as such ever since. Of the ward's three council seats, all three are held by the Conservatives.

== Streetname traditions ==
On the site of Sunderland AFC's former stadium is a small housing estate; its street names are all references to the football club: Promotion Close, Clockstand Close, Goalmouth Close, Midfield Drive, Turnstile Mews and Roker Park Close.

The streets in between Roker Baths Road and Roker Avenue are all named after members of William Ewart Gladstone's cabinet, including: Gladstone, Hartington, Forster, Bright and Stansfield.
