= Open Glider Network =

Open Glider Network (OGN) is a project composed of a network of receivers and servers which aims at creating and maintaining a unified tracking platform for gliders, drones and other aircraft. Focused on tracking aircraft equipped with FLARM and OGN trackers, OGN is also open for integration of other flying objects tracking data sources.

This project relies on satellite navigation and Automatic Packet Reporting System.

This project received good attention from Fédération française de vol en planeur (FFVP), European Union Aviation Safety Agency and Fédération Aéronautique Internationale.
