= Rising Sun Country Park =

Country park in North Tyneside, England

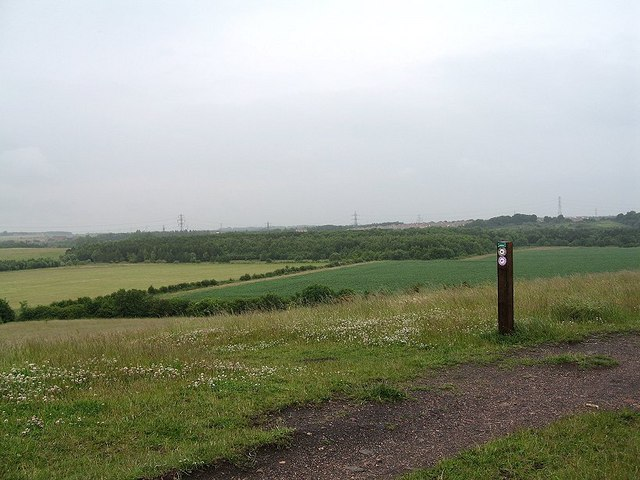

- Location within Tyne and Wear
- Type: Country park
- Location: Benton, North Tyneside, England.
- OS grid: NZ3069
- Coordinates: 55.01°N 1.53°W
- Area: 162 hectares (400 acres)
- Operator: North Tyneside Council
- Open: All year
- Public transit: Palmersville Metro station
- Website: my.northtyneside.gov.uk/category/385/rising-sun-country-park

Rising Sun Country Park is a country park in Benton, North Tyneside, England.

== History ==
Rising Sun Country Park is the former location of a colliery and an isolation hospital for infectious diseases. In 1969 the Rising Sun Colliery closed. It was the last Tyneside colliery on the north bank of the river.

== Facilities ==
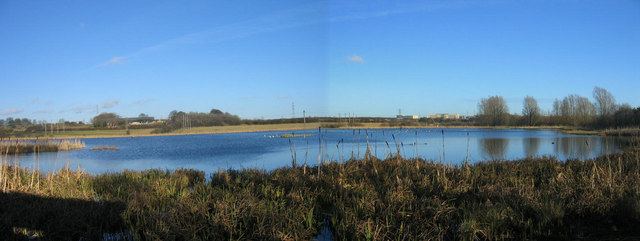
Swallow Pond

There is a countryside centre offering forest schools, a cafe, toilets, educational facilities and an exhibition room. There are footpaths, bridleways, bird hides, parking, a picnic and barbecue area, a children's playground and water play area, cycling and Nordic walking groups. Rising Sun Parkrun takes place every Saturday. The area covered is 162 hectares.

== Rising Sun Farm ==
Rising Sun Farm is a charity based at the park which farms 175 acres of land and has pigs, poultry, sheep, a livery yard and a day care centre. The farm provides resources for education, learning, recreation and volunteering.

== Nature ==
There is a local nature reserve encompassing Swallow pond which has bird hides and is used for bird watching.
