= Offshore Group Newcastle =

Newcastle-based British steel fabricator that makes oil rigs

Offshore Group Newcastle or OGN Group was a British company that fabricated steel in North East England, often for oil platforms. At one time it was Tyneside's largest manufacturing yard.

== History ==
On 5 February 2016 it appeared in the episode Sea Cities Tyneside of BBC Two series Sea Cities. Also appearing in the programme was the Shields Ferry and the Port of Tyne. It also visited South Shields Marine School, part of South Tyneside College and the oldest marine school in the world, Target of Leif Höegh & Co from Norway, the Great North Run, MS Marina of Oceania Cruises, and the Old Low Light.

In late 2016, Offshore Group Newcastle (OGN) sold its Hadrian Yard fabrication facility in Wallsend, North East England, to the Belgian steel construction company Smulders Group. The transaction included the physical site and the transfer of key assets, operations, and parts of OGN's workforce. The acquisition enabled Smulders to expand its capacity in offshore wind infrastructure, particularly the fabrication of jacket foundations and transition pieces for wind turbines. Following the sale, the Wallsend yard was repurposed for renewable energy projects, marking a strategic shift away from OGN's earlier focus on oil and gas infrastructure. The Yard continued to operate under Smulders Group as a major industrial centre in the North East of England.

== Political activity ==
The company donated over £100,000 to the Conservative Party during the 2019 United Kingdom general election

== Structure ==
It is an offshore fabrication yard on the north bank of the River Tyne in Wallsend, near Point Pleasant, opposite the former site of Hebburn Colliery.

== Products ==
- Gas and oil platforms.

== See also ==
- Floating production storage and offloading
- Severfield, of North Yorkshire, who built the Gateshead Millennium Bridge
- Wallsend Slipway & Engineering Company
