= Seaburn =

Coordinates: 54.933°N 1.367°W

- Seaburn Sands

- Location within Tyne and Wear
- Population: 4,000
- OS grid reference: NZ406599
- Metropolitan borough: City of Sunderland
- Metropolitan county: Tyne and Wear
- Region: North East
- Country: England
- Sovereign state: United Kingdom
- Post town: SUNDERLAND
- Postcode district: SR6
- Dialling code: 0191
- Police: Northumbria
- Fire: Tyne and Wear
- Ambulance: North East
- UK Parliament: Sunderland Central

Seaburn is a seaside resort and northeastern suburb of Sunderland, North East England. The village of Whitburn borders the area to the north. To the west and south-west is Fulwell and to the south the coastal resort of Roker.

Virtually all of Seaburn consists of low-density private housing interspersed with open parkland, laid out in the middle of the 20th century. Much of the housing is amongst the most expensive in Sunderland, with many large mansion houses situated along the coast, and on adjoining streets.

The seafront is home to a sandy blue flag beach, seaside promenades, two amusement arcades, children's playgrounds, fish and chip shops, small guest houses and two 4 star hotels, The Grand Hotel and the Seaburn Inn. The main shopping street is Sea Road, which runs from the seafront up through Fulwell to the Seaburn Metro station.

The area around Queens Parade hosts a 'strip' of restaurants, with three Italian, two Indian and two Chinese restaurants in operation as of 2009. Also trading are several pubs and coffee shops. In the late 1980s, the old Seaburn Hall site was redeveloped, with a Morrisons supermarket, new amusement park and leisure and fitness centre. Previously, Seaburn Hall had been a dance hall and live music venue. It was built in 1939 as part of a development scheme which also included the seafront and a funfair.

Seaburn was a favourite place of the painter L. S. Lowry. A large Lowry painting is displayed in the local Morrisons supermarket.

The area was close to the Sunderland A.F.C. stadium Roker Park.

The Sunderland International Airshow was held on the coast at Seaburn and Roker and was the largest free event of its kind in Europe, with a variety of aircraft, civilian and military aircraft on display.

On the Tyne and Wear Metro Seaburn is served by its own station.

The suburb is part of the Fulwell ward on Sunderland City Council, and is represented by three Conservative councillors.
