= History of Sunderland =

History of city in Tyne & Wear, England

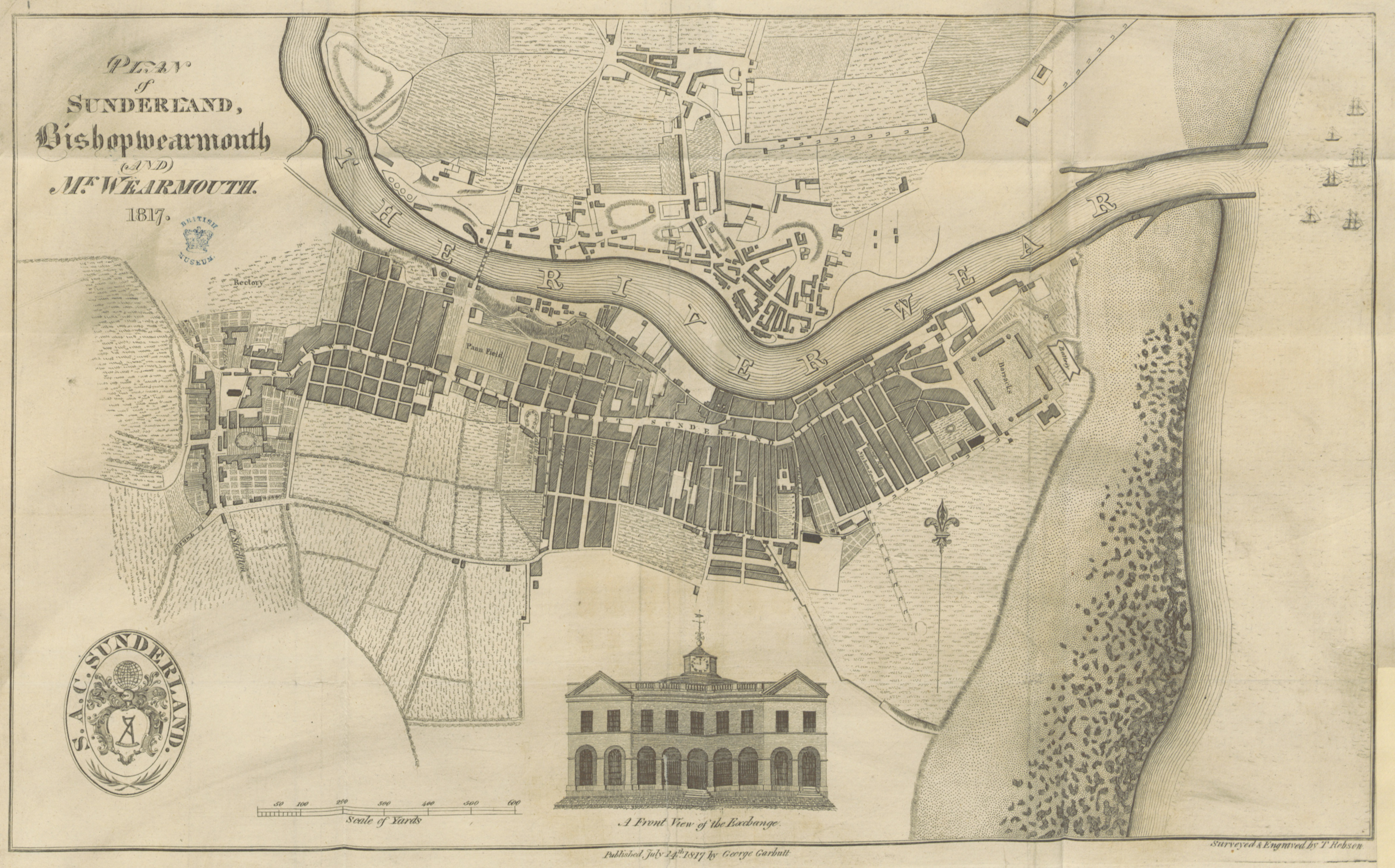
Early 19th century map showing the 18th-century barracks, battery and piers to the east, with the bridge and nearby 'Pann Field' to the west.

In 685, King Ecgfrith granted Benedict Biscop a "sunder-land". Also in 685 The Venerable Bede moved to the newly founded Jarrow monastery. He had started his monastic career at Monkwearmouth monastery and later wrote that he was "ácenned on sundorlande þæs ylcan mynstres" (born in a separate land of this same monastery). This can be taken as "sundorlande" (being Old English for "separate land") or the settlement of Sunderland. Alternatively, it is possible that Sunderland was later named in honour of Bede's connections to the area by people familiar with this statement of his.

== Early history ==
The earliest inhabitants of the Sunderland area were Stone Age hunter-gatherers and artifacts from this era have been discovered, including microliths found during excavations at St Peter's Church, Monkwearmouth. During the final phase of the Stone Age, the Neolithic period (c. 4000 – c. 2000 BC), Hastings Hill, on the western outskirts of Sunderland, was a focal point of activity and a place of burial and ritual significance. Evidence includes the former presence of a cursus monument.

== Roman Empire ==
It is believed the Brigantes inhabited the area around the River Wear in the pre- and post-Roman era. There is a long-standing local legend that there was a Roman settlement on the south bank of the River Wear on what is the site of the former Vaux Brewery, although no archaeological investigation has taken place.

In March 2021, a "trove" of Roman artefacts were recovered in the River Wear at North Hylton, including four stone anchors, a discovery of huge significance that may affirm a persistent theory of a Roman Dam or Port existing at the River Wear.

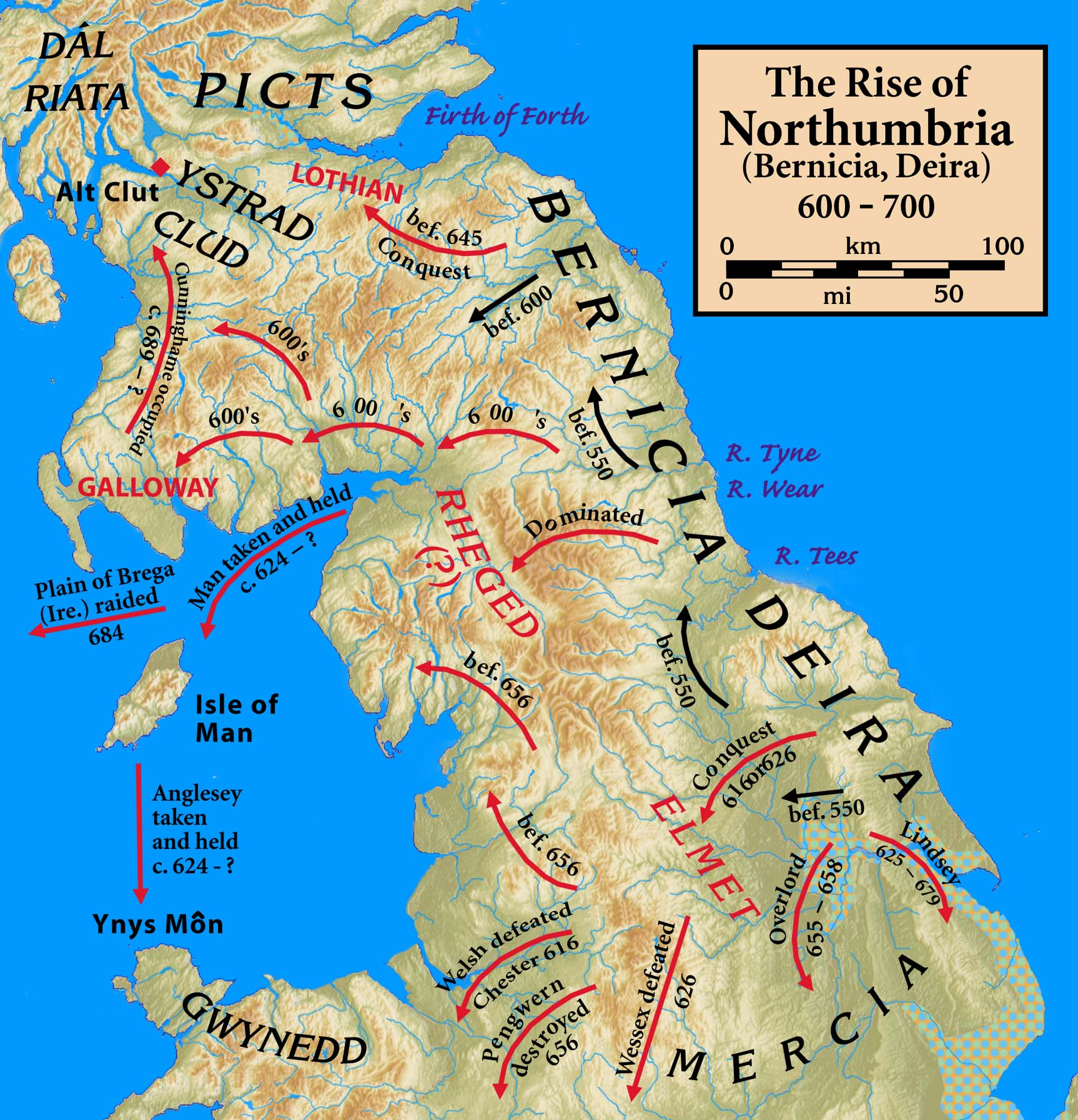
The areas that are now Sunderland were once part of the Kingdom of Northumbria.

== Early Middle Ages: Anglo-Saxon Northumbria ==
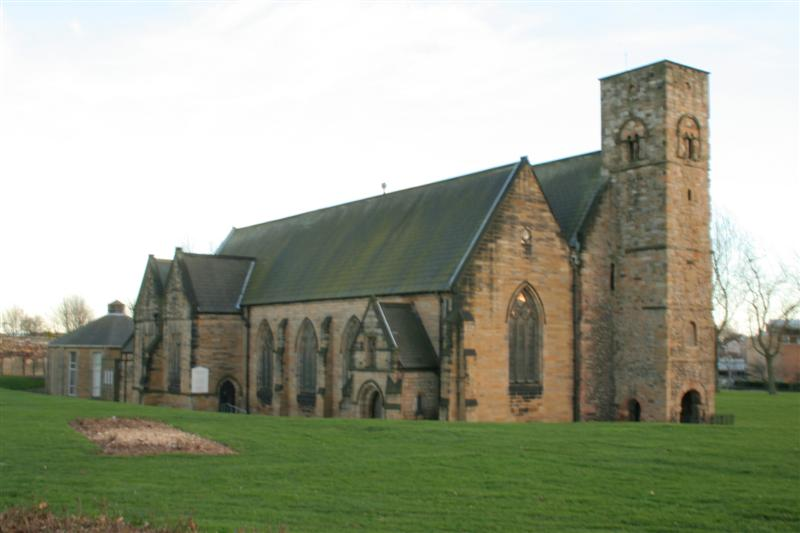
St Peter's Church in Monkwearmouth. Only the porch and part of the west wall are what remain of the original monastery built in 674.

Recorded settlements at the mouth of the Wear date to 674, when an Anglo-Saxon nobleman, Benedict Biscop, granted land by King Ecgfrith of Northumbria, founded the Wearmouth–Jarrow (St Peter's) monastery on the north bank of the river—an area that became known as Monkwearmouth. Biscop's monastery was the first built of stone in Northumbria. He employed glaziers from France and in doing he re-established glass making in Britain. In 686 the community was taken over by Ceolfrid, and Wearmouth–Jarrow became a major centre of learning and knowledge in Anglo-Saxon England with a library of around 300 volumes.

The Codex Amiatinus, described by White as the 'finest book in the world', was created at the monastery and was likely worked on by Bede, who was born at Wearmouth in 673. This is one of the oldest monasteries still standing in England. While at the monastery, Bede completed the Historia ecclesiastica gentis Anglorum (The Ecclesiastical History of the English People) in 731, a feat which earned him the title The father of English history.

In the late 8th century the Vikings raided the coast, and by the middle of the 9th century the monastery had been abandoned. Lands on the south side of the river were granted to the Bishop of Durham by Athelstan of England in 930; these became known as Bishopwearmouth and included settlements such as Ryhope which fall within the modern boundary of Sunderland.

== Medieval developments after the Norman conquest ==
In 1100, Bishopwearmouth parish included a fishing village at the southern mouth of the river (now the East End) known as 'Soender-land' (which evolved into 'Sunderland'). This settlement was granted a charter in 1179 by Hugh Pudsey, then the Bishop of Durham (who had quasi-monarchical power within the County Palatine); the charter gave its merchants the same rights as those of Newcastle upon Tyne, but it nevertheless took time for Sunderland to develop as a port. Fishing was the main commercial activity at the time: mainly herring in the 13th century, then salmon in the 14th and 15th centuries. From 1346 ships were being built at Wearmouth, by a merchant named Thomas Menville, and by 1396 a small amount of coal was being exported.

Rapid growth of the port was initially prompted by the salt trade. Salt exports from Sunderland are recorded from as early as the 13th century, but in 1589 salt pans were laid at Bishopwearmouth Panns (the modern-day name of the area the pans occupied is Pann's Bank, on the river bank between the city centre and the East End). Large vats of seawater were heated using coal; as the water evaporated, the salt remained. As coal was required to heat the salt pans, a coal mining community began to emerge. Only poor-quality coal was used in salt panning; better-quality coal was traded via the port, which subsequently began to grow.

== 17th century ==
Both salt and coal continued to be exported through the 17th century, but the coal trade grew significantly (2–3,000 tons of coal were exported from Sunderland in the year 1600; by 1680 this had increased to 180,000 tons). Because of the difficulty for colliers trying to navigate the shallow waters of the Wear, coal mined further inland was loaded onto keels (large, flat-bottomed boats) and taken downriver to the waiting colliers. The keels were manned by a close-knit group of workers known as 'keelmen'.

In 1634 a charter was granted by Bishop Thomas Morton, which incorporated the inhabitants of the 'antient borough' of Sunderland as the 'Mayor, Aldermen and Commonality' of the Borough and granted the privilege of a market and an annual fair. While as a consequence a mayor and twelve aldermen were appointed and a common council established, their establishment does not seem to have survived the ensuing Civil War.

Before the 1st English civil war the North, with the exclusion of Kingston upon Hull, declared for the King. In 1644 the North was captured by parliament. The villages that later become Sunderland, were taken in March 1644. One artifact of the English civil war near this area was the long trench; a tactic of later warfare. In the village of Offerton roughly three miles inland from the area, skirmishes occurred. Parliament also blockaded the River Tyne, crippling the Newcastle coal trade which allowed the coal trade of the area to flourish for a short period. There was intense rivalry between the ports of Sunderland and Newcastle when the two towns took opposing sides in the Civil War.

In 1669, after the Restoration, King Charles II granted letters patent to one Edward Andrew, Esq. to 'build a pier and erect a lighthouse or lighthouses and cleanse the harbour of Sunderland', and authorised the levying of a tonnage duty on shipping in order to raise the necessary funds; however it took time before these improvements were realized.

There is evidence of a growing number of shipbuilders or boatbuilders being active on the River Wear in the late 17th century: among others, the banking family Goodchilds opened a building yard in 1672 (it eventually closed when the bank went out of business in 1821); and in 1691 one Thomas Burn aged 17 is recorded as having taken over the running of a yard from his mother.

== 18th century ==
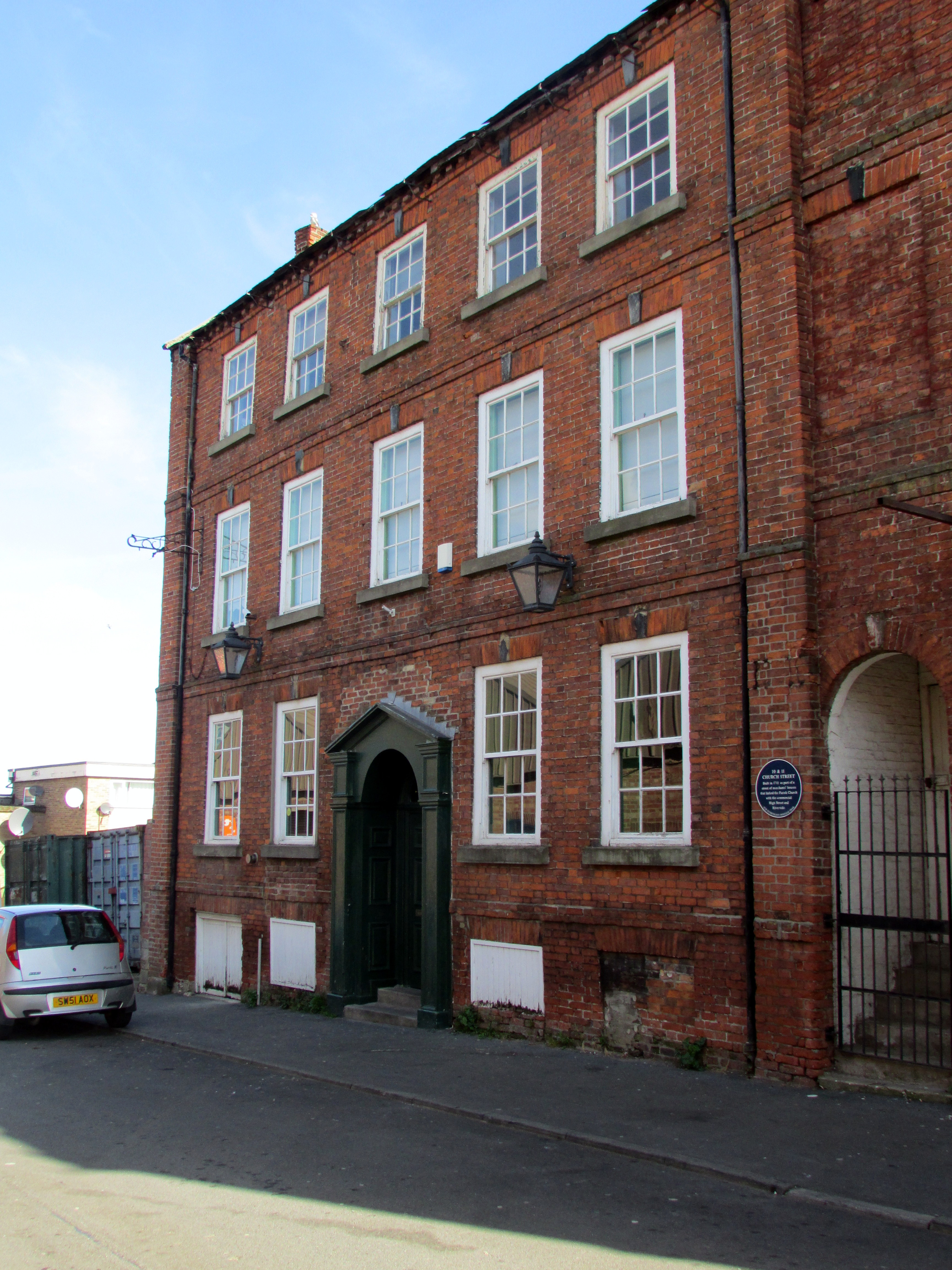
Rare surviving early 18th-century merchant's house (later used as a warehouse) in Church Street, Sunderland.

=== River works ===
The River Wear Commission was formed in 1717 in response to the growing prosperity of Sunderland as a port. Under the Board of Commissioners (a committee of local land owners, ship owners, colliery owners and merchants) a succession of civil engineers adapted the natural riverscape to meet the needs of maritime trade and shipbuilding. Their first major harbour work was the construction in stone of the South Pier (later known as the Old South Pier), begun in 1723 with the aim of diverting the river channel away from sandbanks; the building of the South Pier continued until 1759. By 1748 the river was being manually dredged. A northern counterpart to the South Pier was not yet in place; instead, a temporary breakwater was formed at around this time, consisting of a row of piles driven into the seabed interspersed with old keelboats. From 1786 work began on a more permanent North Pier (which was later known as the Old North Pier): it was formed from a wooden frame, filled with stones and faced with masonry, and eventually extended 1,500 ft (460 m) into the sea. The work was initially overseen by Robert Shout (the Wear Commissioners' Engineer from 1781 to 1795). In 1794 a lighthouse was built at the seaward end, by which time around half the pier had been enclosed in masonry; it was completed in 1802.

By the start of the 18th century the banks of the Wear were described as being studded with small shipyards, as far as the tide flowed. After 1717, measures having been taken to increase the depth of the river, Sunderland's shipbuilding trade grew substantially (in parallel with its coal exports). A number of warships were built, alongside many commercial sailing ships. By the middle of the century the town was probably the premier shipbuilding centre in Britain. By 1788 Sunderland was Britain's fourth largest port (by measure of tonnage) after London, Newcastle and Liverpool; among these it was the leading coal exporter (though it did not rival Newcastle in terms of home coal trade). Still further growth was driven across the region, towards the end of the century, by London's insatiable demand for coal during the French Revolutionary Wars.

Sunderland's third-biggest export, after coal and salt, was glass. The town's first modern glassworks were established in the 1690s and the industry grew through the 17th century. Its flourishing was aided by trading ships bringing good-quality sand (as ballast) from the Baltic and elsewhere which, together with locally available limestone (and coal to fire the furnaces) was a key ingredient in the glassmaking process. Other industries that developed alongside the river included lime burning and pottery making (the town's first commercial pottery manufactory, the Garrison Pottery, had opened in old Sunderland in 1750).

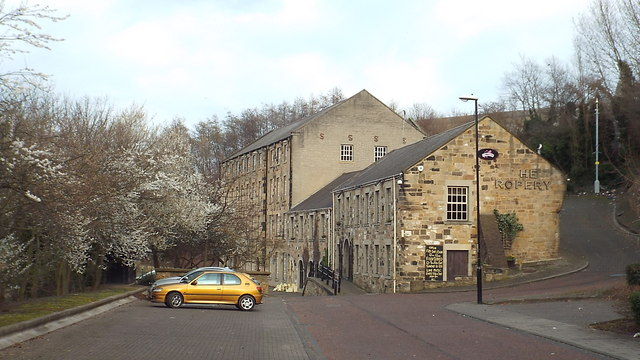
Grimshaw and Webster's Patent Ropery of 1797: the world's oldest factory for machine-made rope.

The world's first steam dredger was built in Sunderland in 1796-7 and put to work on the river the following year. Designed by Stout's successor as Engineer, Jonathan Pickernell jr (in post from 1795 to 1804), it consisted of a set of 'bag and spoon' dredgers driven by a tailor-made 4-horsepower Boulton & Watt beam engine. It was designed to dredge to a maximum depth of 10 ft (3.0 m) below the waterline and remained in operation until 1804, when its constituent parts were sold as separate lots. Onshore, numerous small industries supported the business of the burgeoning port. In 1797 the world's first patent ropery (producing machine-made rope, rather than using a ropewalk) was built in Sunderland, using a steam-powered hemp-spinning machine which had been devised by a local schoolmaster, Richard Fothergill, in 1793; the ropery building still stands, in the Deptford area of the city.

=== Urban developments ===
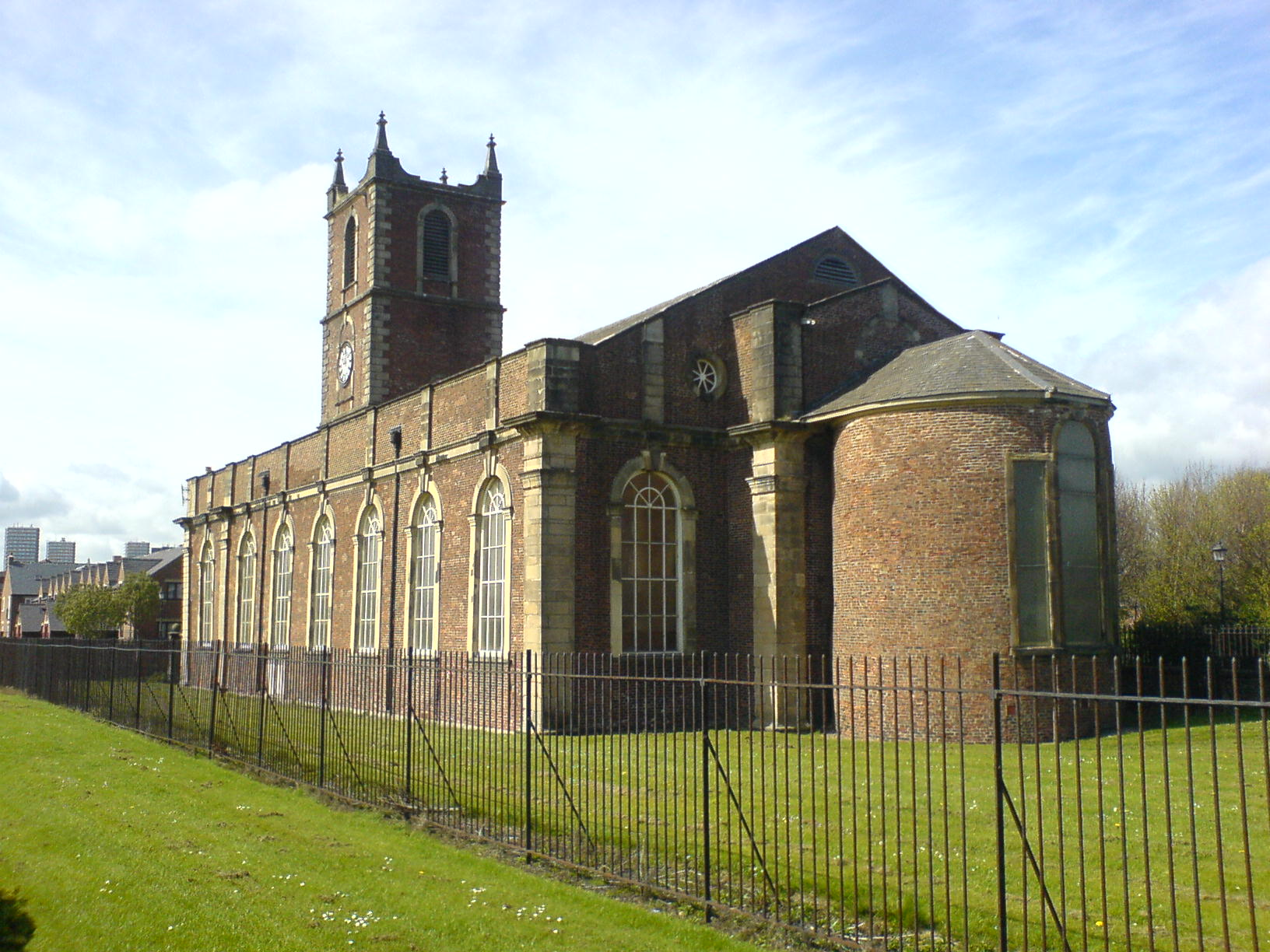
Holy Trinity Church, Sunderland, built in 1719

In 1719, the parish of Sunderland was carved from the densely populated east end of Bishopwearmouth by the establishment of a new parish church, Holy Trinity Church, Sunderland (today also known as Sunderland Old Parish Church). Later, in 1769, St John's Church was built as a chapel of ease within Holy Trinity parish; built by a local coal fitter, John Thornhill, it stood in Prospect Row to the north-east of the parish church. (St John's was demolished in 1972.) By 1720 the port area was completely built up, with large houses and gardens facing the Town Moor and the sea, and labourers' dwellings vying with manufactories alongside the river. The three original settlements of Wearmouth (Bishopwearmouth, Monkwearmouth and Sunderland) had begun to combine, driven by the success of the port of Sunderland and salt panning and shipbuilding along the banks of the river. Around this time, Sunderland was known as 'Sunderland-near-the-Sea'.

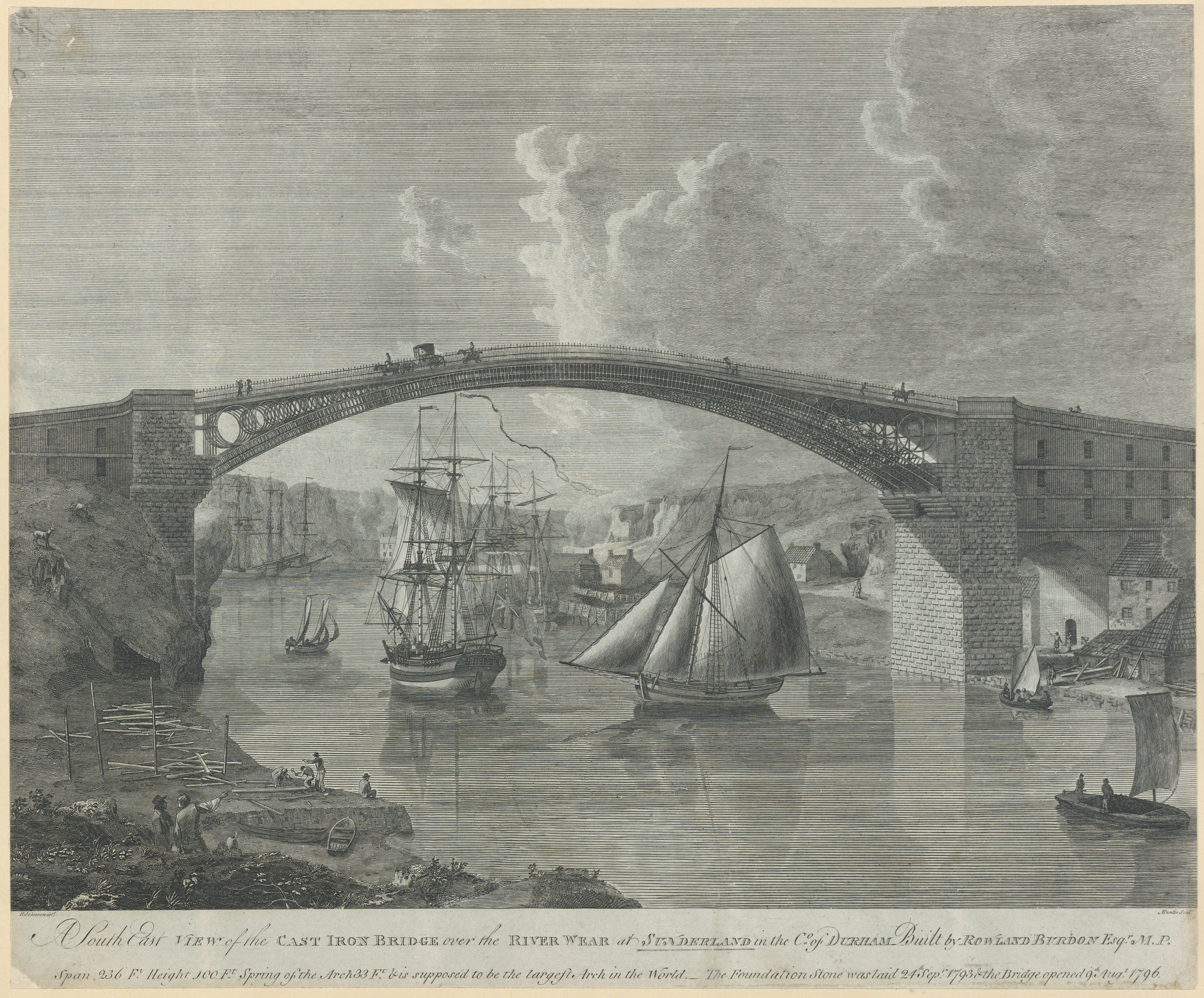
A South East View of Wearmouth Bridge (c.1796).

By 1770 Sunderland had spread westwards along its High Street to join up with Bishopwearmouth. In 1796 Bishopwearmouth in turn gained a physical link with Monkwearmouth following the construction of a bridge, the Wearmouth Bridge, which was the world's second iron bridge (after the famous span at Ironbridge). It was built at the instigation of Rowland Burdon, the Member of Parliament (MP) for County Durham, and described by Nikolaus Pevsner as being 'a triumph of the new metallurgy and engineering ingenuity [...] of superb elegance'. Spanning the river in a single sweep of 236 feet (72 m), it was over twice the length of the earlier bridge at Ironbridge but only three-quarters the weight. At the time of building, it was the biggest single-span bridge in the world; and because Sunderland had developed on a plateau above the river, it never suffered from the problem of interrupting the passage of high-masted vessels.

=== Defences ===
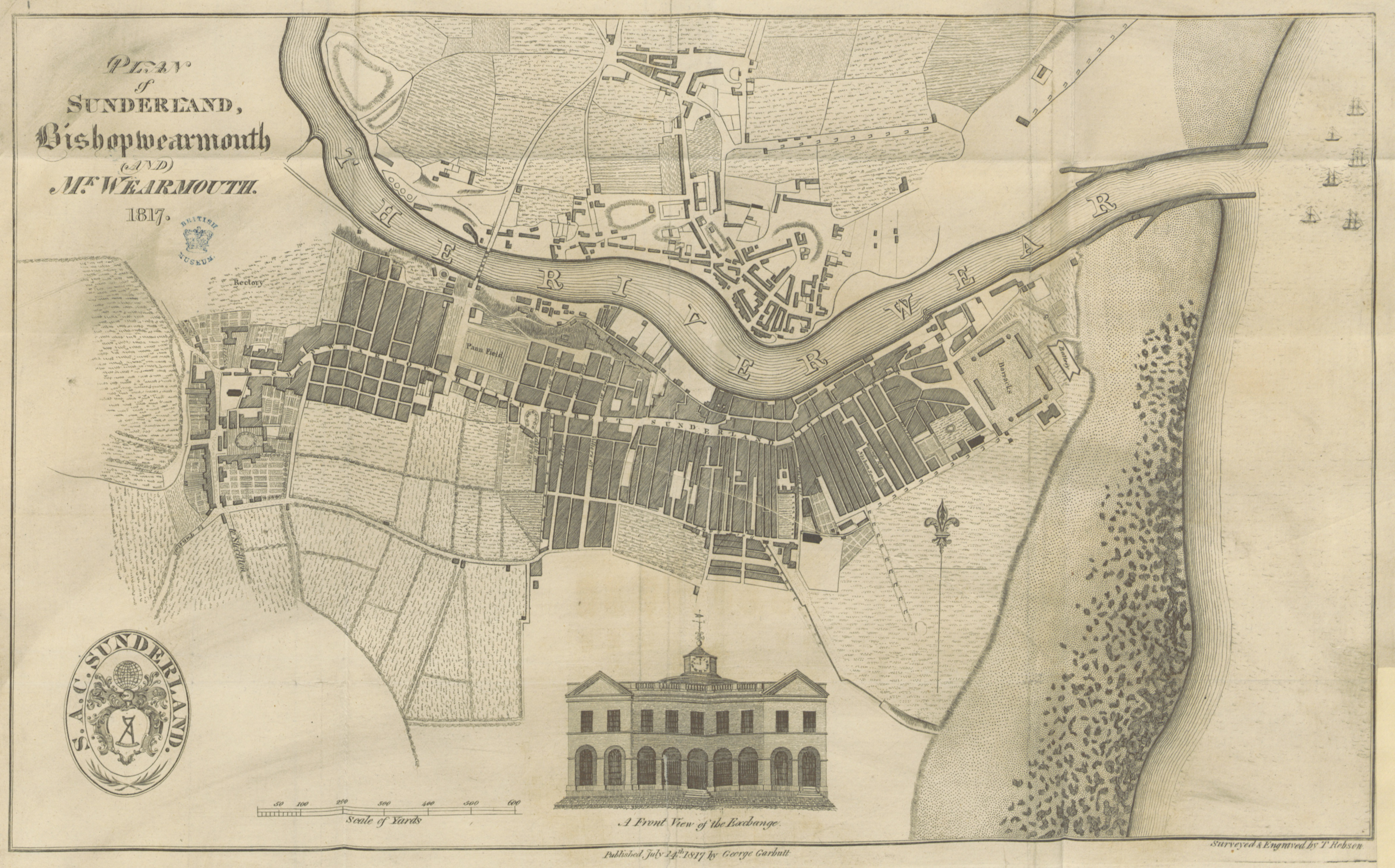
Early 19th century map showing the 18th-century barracks, battery and piers to the east, with the bridge and nearby 'Pann Field' to the west.

During the War of Jenkins' Ear a pair of gun batteries were built (in 1742 and 1745) on the shoreline to the south of the South Pier, to defend the river from attack (a further battery was built on the cliff top in Roker, ten years later). One of the pair was washed away by the sea in 1780, but the other was expanded during the French Revolutionary Wars and became known as the Black Cat Battery. In 1794 Sunderland Barracks were built, behind the battery, close to what was then the tip of the headland.

== 19th century ==
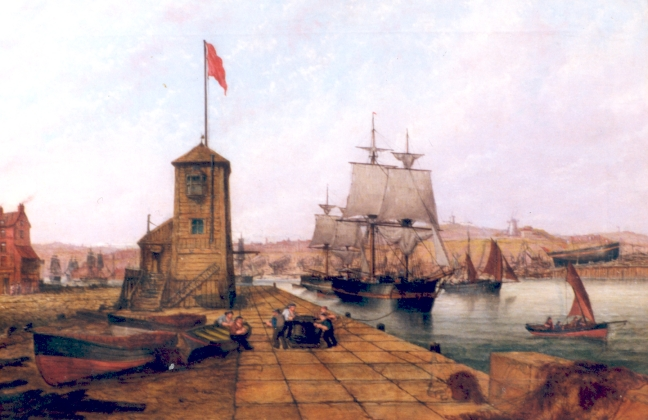
View from the South Pier in the first half of the 19th century.

In 1802 a new, 72 ft (22 m) high octagonal stone lighthouse was built on the end of the newly finished North Pier, designed by the chief Engineer Jonathan Pickernell. At the same time he built a lighthouse on the South Pier, which showed a red light (or by day a red flag) when the tide was high enough for ships to pass into the river. From 1820 Pickernell's lighthouse was lit by gas from its own gasometer. In 1840 work began to extend the North Pier to 1,770 ft (540 m) and the following year its lighthouse was moved in one piece, on a wooden cradle, to its new seaward end, remaining lit each night throughout the process.

=== Local government ===
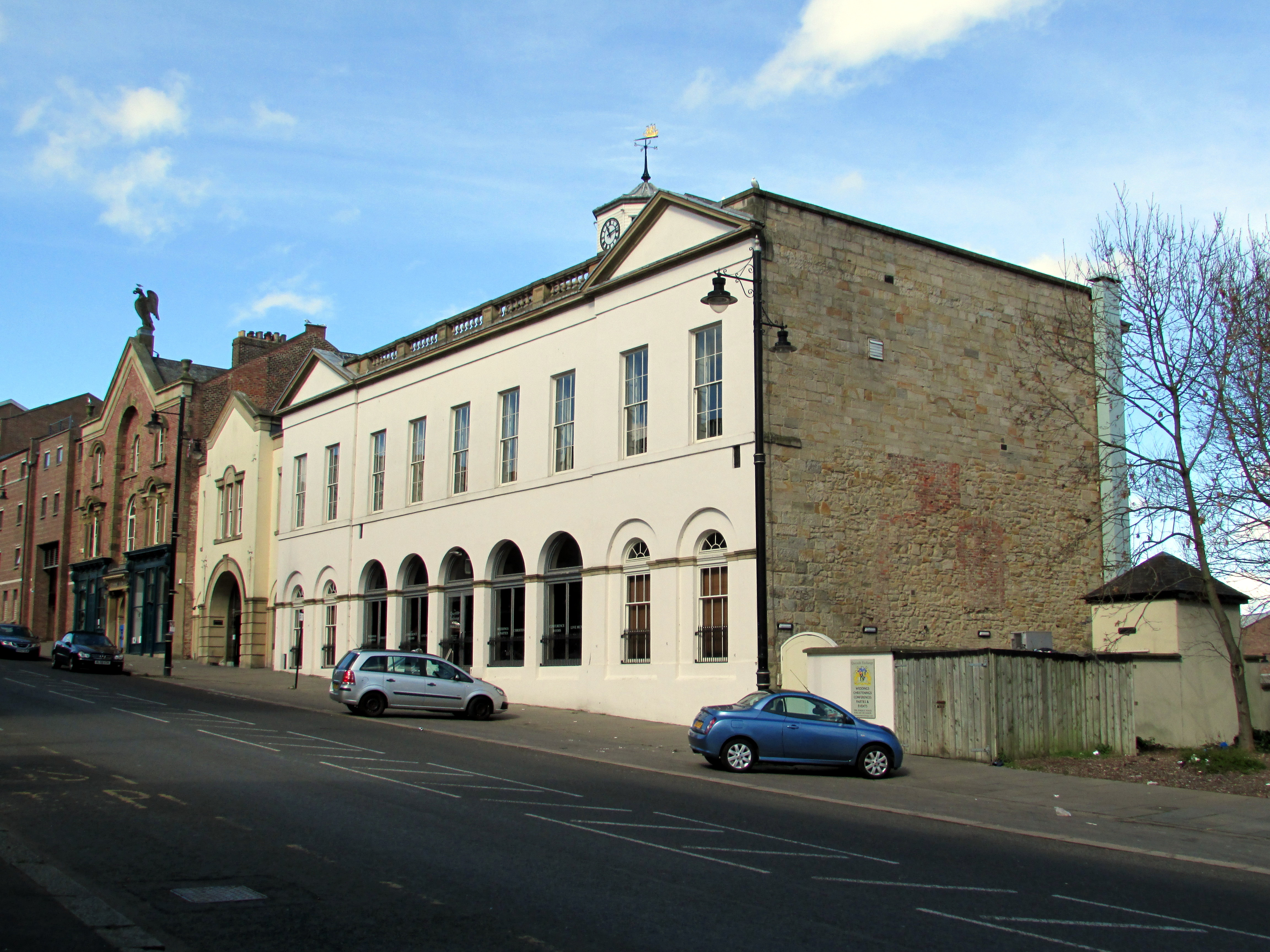
The Exchange Building (1812–14) in High Street East

In 1809 an act of Parliament was passed creating an Improvement Commission, for 'paving, lighting, cleansing, watching and otherwise improving the town of Sunderland'; this provided the beginnings of a structure of local government for the township as a whole. Commissioners were appointed, with the power to levy contributions towards the works detailed in the act, and in 1812–14 the Exchange Building was built, funded by public subscription, to serve as a combined town hall, watch house, market hall, magistrates' court, post office and news room. It became a regular gathering place for merchants conducting business, and the public rooms on the first floor were available for public functions when not being used for meetings of the commissioners. By 1830 the commissioners had made a number of improvements, ranging from the establishment of a police force to installing gas lighting across much of the town.

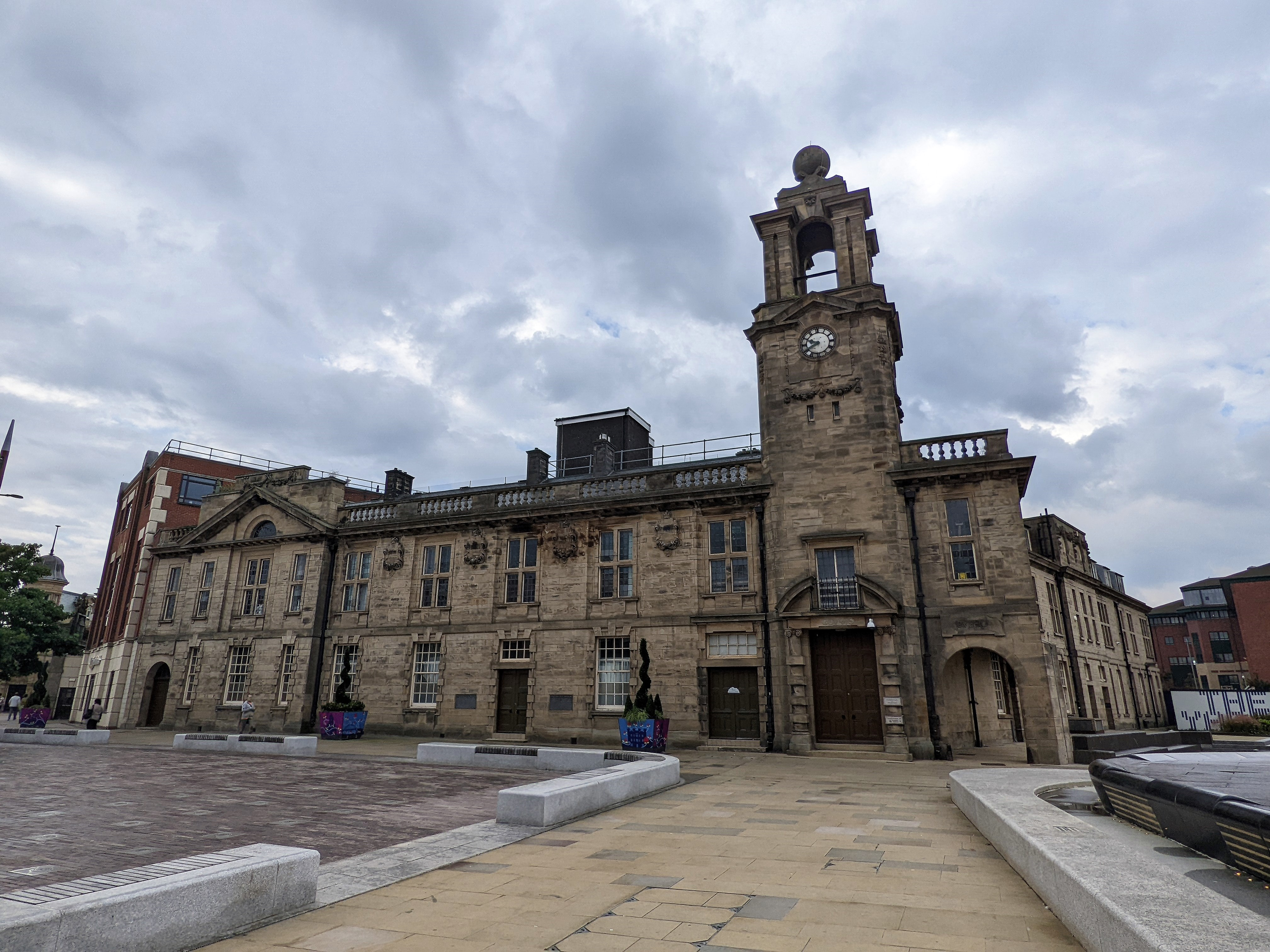
The Magistrate's Court

In other aspects, however, Local government was still divided between the three parishes (Holy Trinity Church, Sunderland, St Michael's, Bishopwearmouth, and St Peter's Church, Monkwearmouth) and when cholera broke out in 1831 their select vestrymen were unable to cope with the epidemic. Sunderland, a main trading port at the time, was the first British town to be struck with the 'Indian cholera' epidemic. The first victim, William Sproat, died on 23 October 1831. Sunderland was put into quarantine, and the port was blockaded, but in December of that year the disease spread to Gateshead and from there, it rapidly made its way across the country, killing an estimated 32,000 people; among those to die was Sunderland's Naval hero Jack Crawford. (The novel The Dress Lodger by American author Sheri Holman is set in Sunderland during the epidemic.)

Demands for democracy and organised town government saw the three parishes incorporated as the Borough of Sunderland in 1835. Later, the Borough of Sunderland Act 1851 (14 & 15 Vict. c. lxvii) abolished the Improvement Commission and vested its powers in the new Corporation.

=== Coal, staiths, railways and docks ===
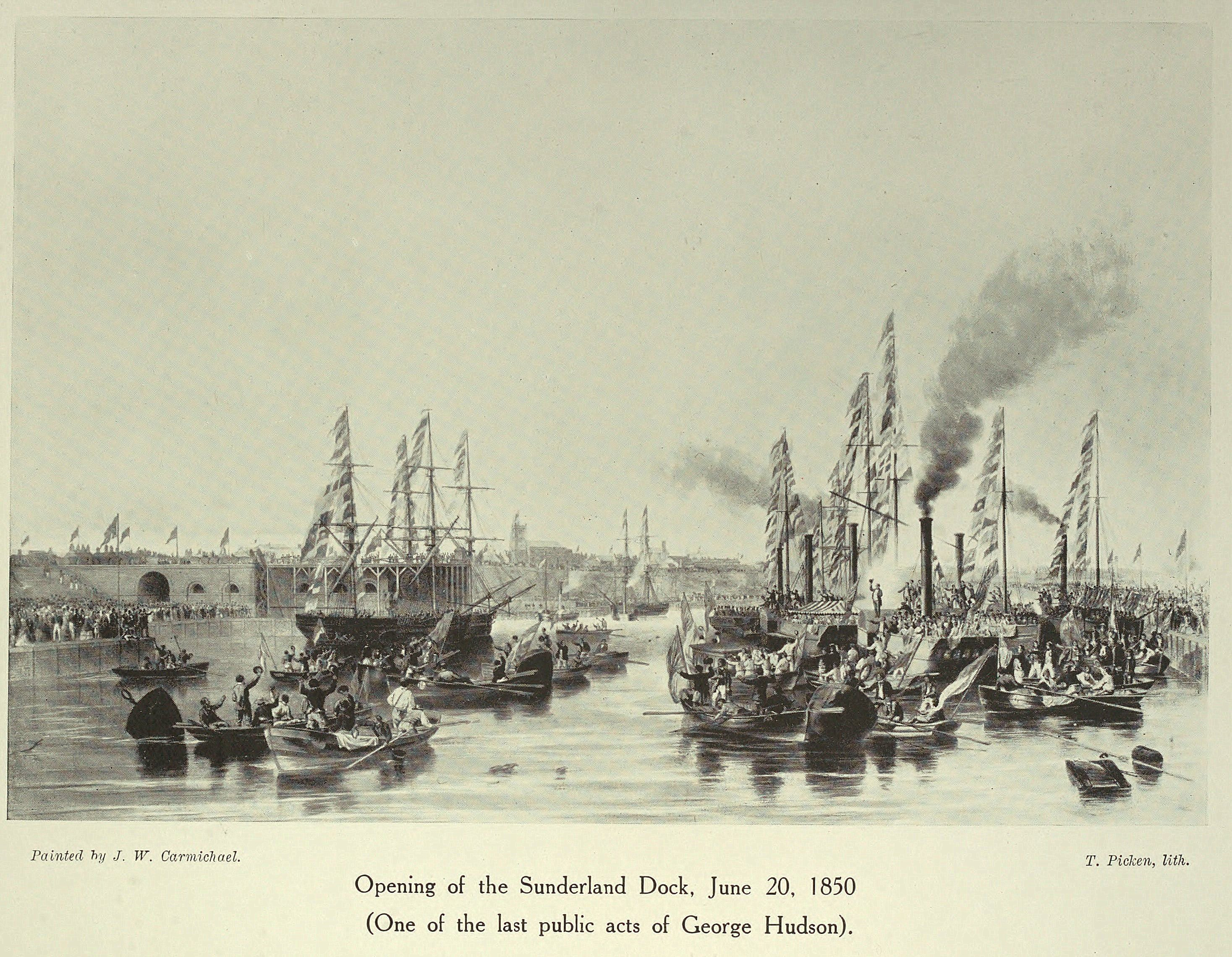
The opening of Hudson Dock on 20 June 1850; on the left the staiths of the York, Newcastle & Berwick Railway

In the early nineteenth century 'the three great proprietors of collieries upon the Wear [were] Lord Durham, the Marquis of Londonderry and the Hetton Company'. In 1822 the Hetton colliery railway was opened, linking the company's collieries with staiths ('Hetton Staiths') on the riverside at Bishopwearmouth, where coal drops delivered the coal directly into waiting ships. Engineered by George Stephenson, it was the first railway in the world to be operated without animal power, and at the time (albeit briefly) was the longest railway in the world. At the same time Lord Durham began establishing rail links to an adjacent set of staiths ('Lambton Staiths'). Lord Londonderry, on the other hand, continued conveying his coal downriver on keels; but he was working on establishing his own separate port down the coast at Seaham Harbour.

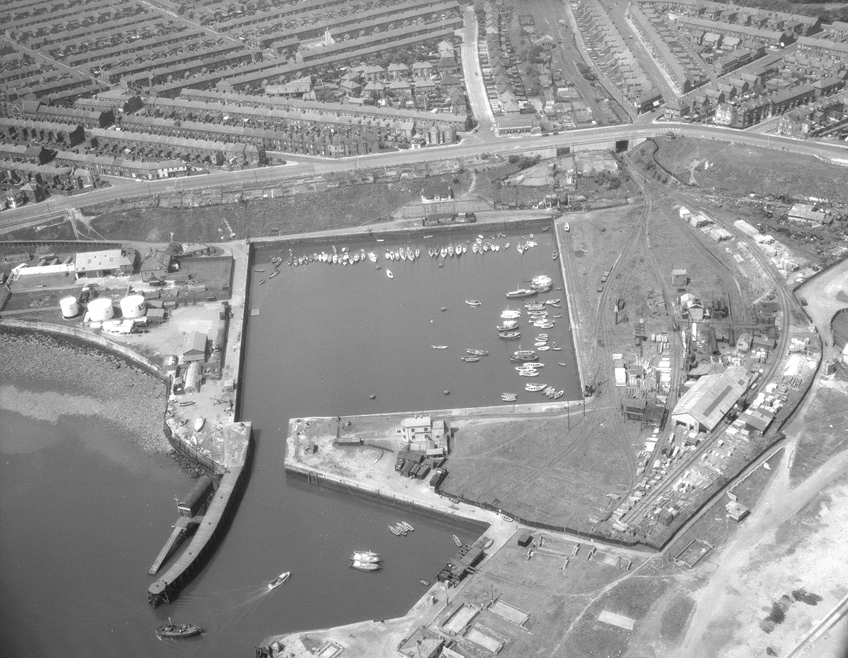
North Dock in 1957; the steam-powered wood yard to the right remained operational till 1990.

Although the volume of coal exports were increasing, there was a growing concern that without the establishment of a purpose-built dock Sunderland would start losing trade to Newcastle and Hartlepool. The colliery rail links were on the south side of the river, but Sir Hedworth Williamson, who owned much of the land on the north bank, seized the initiative. He formed the Wearmouth Dock Company in 1832, obtained a royal charter for establishing a dock at Monkwearmouth riverside, and engaged no less a figure than Isambard Kingdom Brunel to provide designs (not only for docks but also for a double-deck suspension bridge to provide a rail link to the opposite side of the river). Building of the dock went ahead (albeit the smallest of Brunel's proposals) but not of the bridge; the resulting North Dock, opened in 1837, soon proved too small at 6 acres (2.4 ha), and it suffered through lack of a direct rail link to the colliery lines south of the Wear (instead, it would be linked, by way of the Brandling Junction Railway from 1839, to collieries in the Gateshead area).

Also in Monkwearmouth, further upstream, work began in 1826 on sinking a pit in the hope of reaching the seams of coal (even though, at this location, they were deep underground). Seven years later, coal was struck at 180 fathoms; digging deeper, the Bensham seam was found the following year at 267 fathoms and in 1835 Wearmouth Colliery, which was then the deepest mine in the world, began producing coal. When the superior Hutton seam was reached, at a still greater depth in 1846, the mine (which had begun as a speculative enterprise by Messrs Pemberton and Thompson) began to be profitable.

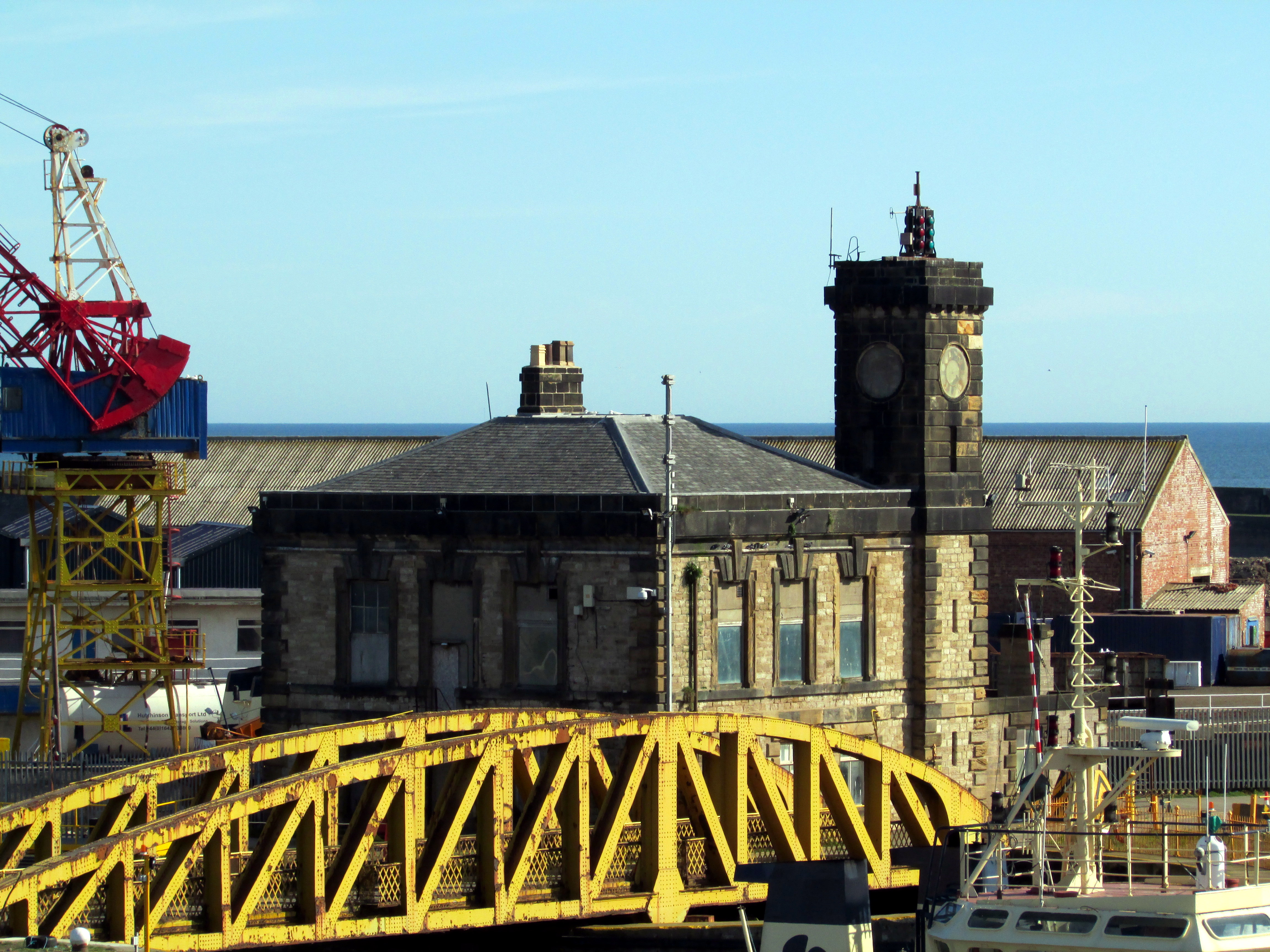
Sunderland Dock Company offices (1850 by John Murray) and the Gladstone Swing Bridge of 1874

Meanwhile, south of the river, the Durham and Sunderland Railway Company built a railway line across the Town Moor and established a passenger terminus there in 1836. In 1847 the line was bought by George Hudson's York and Newcastle Railway. Hudson, nicknamed 'The Railway King', was Member of Parliament for Sunderland and was already involved in a scheme to build a dock in the area. In 1846 he had formed the Sunderland Dock Company, which received an act of Parliament giving approval for the construction of a dock between the South Pier and Hendon Bay. The engineer overseeing the project was John Murray; the foundation stone for the entrance basin was laid in February 1848, and by the end of the year excavation of the new dock was largely complete, the spoil being used in the associated land reclamation works. Lined with limestone and entered from the river by way of a half tide basin, the dock (later named Hudson Dock) was formally opened by Hudson on 20 June 1850. Most of the dockside to the west was occupied with coal staiths linked to the railway line, but there was also a warehouse and granary built at the northern end by John Dobson in 1856 (this, along with a second warehouse dating from the 1860s, was demolished in 1992).

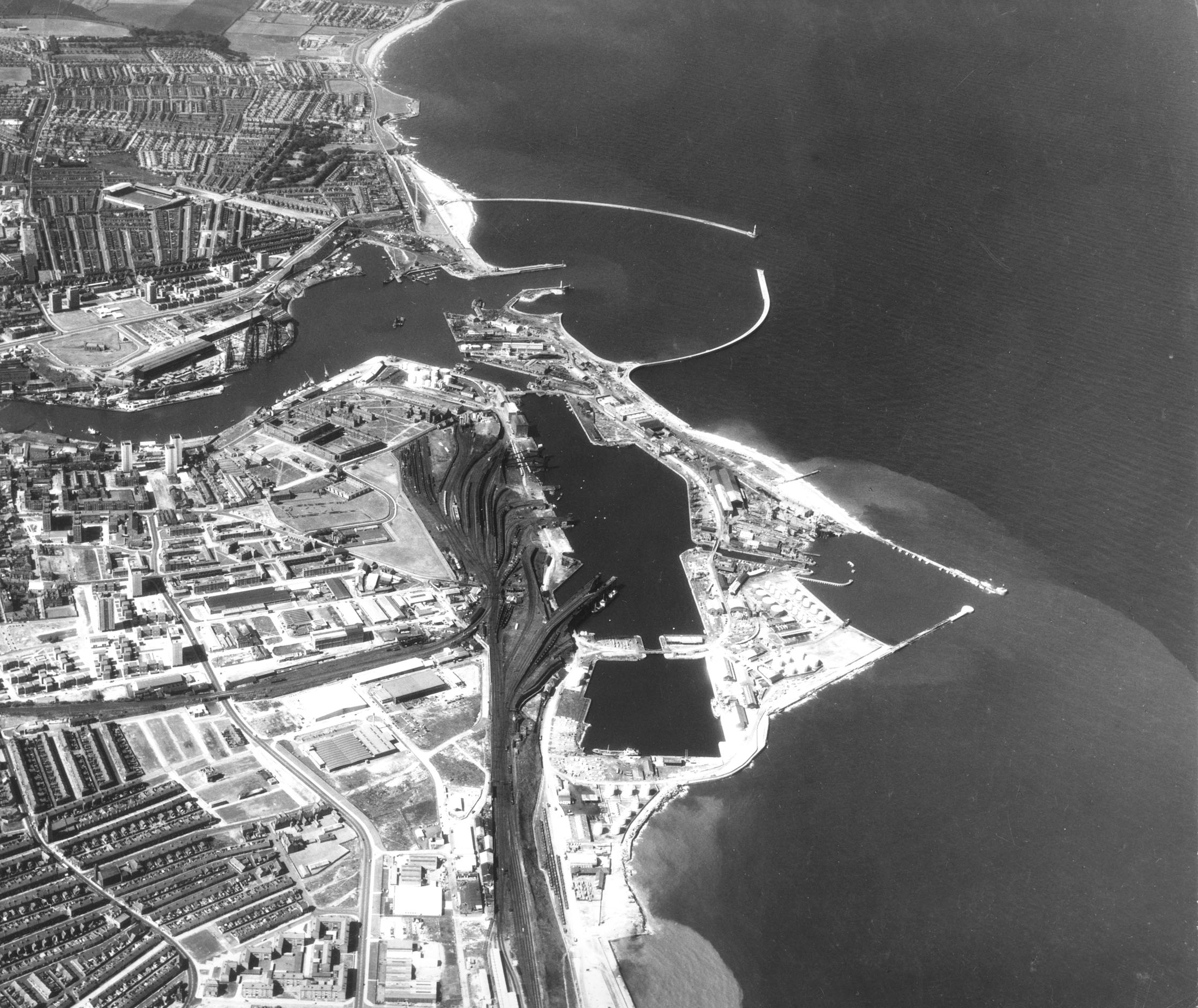
River Wear (top) in 1969, with Hudson Dock, Hendon Dock and associated rail links to the south

In 1850–56 a half-tidal sea-entrance was constructed at the south-east corner of the dock, protected by a pair of breakwaters, to allow larger ships to enter the dock direct from the North Sea. At the same time (1853–55) Hudson Dock itself was extended southwards and deepened, and, alongside the entrance basin to the north, the first of a pair of public graving docks was built. In 1854 the Londonderry, Seaham & Sunderland Railway opened, linking the Londonderry and South Hetton collieries to a separate set of staiths at Hudson Dock South. It also provided a passenger service from Sunderland to Seaham Harbour.

In 1859 the docks were purchased by the River Wear Commissioners. Under Thomas Meik as engineer the docks were further extended with the construction of Hendon Dock to the south (1864–67). (Hendon Dock was entered via Hudson Dock South, but in 1870 it too was provided with a half-tidal sea-entrance providing direct access from the North Sea.) Under Meik's successor, Henry Hay Wake, Hudson Dock was further enlarged and the entrances were improved: in 1875 lock gates were installed (along with a swing bridge) at the river entrance, to allow entry at all states of the tide; they were powered by hydraulic machinery, installed by Sir William Armstrong in the adjacent dock office building. Similarly, a new sea lock was constructed at the south-east entrance in 1877–80. The breakwater (known as the 'Northeast Pier') which protected the sea entrance to the docks was provided with a lighthouse (29 ft (8.8 m) high and of lattice construction, since demolished) which Chance Brothers equipped with a fifth-order optic and clockwork occulting mechanism in 1888; it displayed a sector light: white indicating the fairway and red indicating submerged hazards.

By 1889 two million tons of coal per year was passing through the dock. The eastern wharves, opposite the coal staiths, were mainly occupied by saw mills and timber yards, with large open spaces given over to the storage of pit props for use in the mines; while to the south of Hendon Dock, the Wear Fuel Works distilled coal tar to produce pitch, oil and other products.

After completion of the dock works, H. H. Wake embarked on the construction of Roker Pier (part of a scheme to protect the river approach by creating an outer harbour). Protection of a different kind was provided by the Wave Basin Battery, armed with four RML 80 pounder 5 ton guns, constructed just inside the Old South Pier in 1874.

Increasing industrialisation had prompted affluent residents to move away from the old port area, with several settling in the suburban terraces of the Fawcett Estate and Mowbray Park. The area around Fawcett Street itself increasingly functioned as the civic and commercial town centre. In 1848 George Hudson's York, Newcastle and Berwick Railway built a passenger terminus, Monkwearmouth Station, just north of Wearmouth Bridge; and south of the river another passenger terminus, in Fawcett Street, in 1853. Later, Thomas Elliot Harrison (chief engineer to the North Eastern Railway) made plans to carry the railway across the river; the Wearmouth Railway Bridge (reputedly 'the largest Hog-Back iron girder bridge in the world') opened in 1879. In 1886–90 Sunderland Town Hall was built in Fawcett Street, just to the east of the railway station, to a design by Brightwen Binyon.

=== "The greatest shipbuilding port in the world" ===
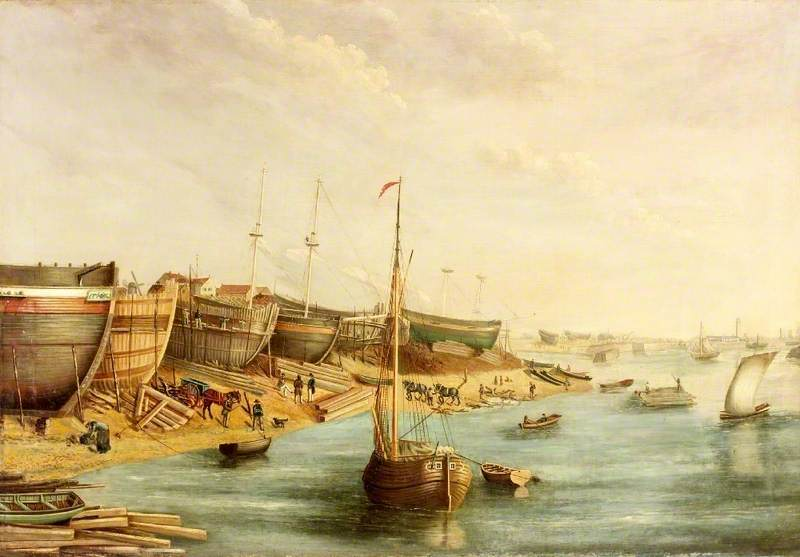
William Pile's Shipyard at North Sands, c. 1830; described as the greatest ship designer of his age, he built more than 100 ships in wood and almost as many in iron.

Sunderland's shipbuilding industry continued to grow through most of the 19th century, becoming the town's dominant industry and a defining part of its identity. By 1815 it was 'the leading shipbuilding port for wooden trading vessels' with 600 ships constructed that year across 31 different yards. By 1840 the town had 76 shipyards and between 1820 and 1850 the number of ships being built on the Wear increased fivefold. From 1846 to 1854 almost a third of the UK's ships were built in Sunderland, and in 1850 the Sunderland Herald proclaimed the town to be the greatest shipbuilding port in the world.

During the century the size of ships being built increased and technologies evolved: in 1852 the first iron ship was launched on Wearside, built by marine engineer George Clark in partnership with shipbuilder John Barkes. Thirty years later Sunderland's ships were being built in steel (the last wooden ship having been launched in 1880). As the century progressed, the shipyards on the Wear decreased in number on the one hand, but increased in size on the other, so as to accommodate the increasing scale and complexity of ships being built.

Shipyards founded in the 19th century, and still operational in the 20th, included:

- Sir James Laing & Sons (established by Philip Laing at Deptford in 1818, renamed Sir James Laing & sons in 1898)
- S. P. Austin (established in 1826 at Monkwearmouth, moving across the river to a site alongside Wearmouth Bridge in 1866)
- Bartram & Sons (established at Hylton in 1837, moved to South Dock in 1871)
- William Doxford & Sons (established at Cox Green in 1840, moved to Pallion in 1857)
- William Pickersgill's (established at Southwick in 1845)
- J. L. Thompson & Sons (yard established at North Sands by Robert Thompson in 1846, taken over by his son Joseph in 1860, another son (also Robert) having established his own yard at Southwick in 1854)
- John Crown & Sons (yard established at Monkwearmouth by Luke Crown (or Crone) by 1807, taken over by his grandson Jackie in 1854)
- Short Brothers (established by George Short in 1850, moved to Pallion in 1866)
- Sir J Priestman (established at Southwick in 1882)

Alongside the shipyards, marine engineering works were established from the 1820s onwards, initially providing engines for paddle steamers; in 1845 a ship named Experiment was the first of many to be converted to steam screw propulsion. Demand for steam-powered vessels increased during the Crimean War; nonetheless, sailing ships continued to be built, including fast fully-rigged composite-built clippers, including the City of Adelaide in 1864 and Torrens (the last such vessel ever built), in 1875.

=== Other industries ===
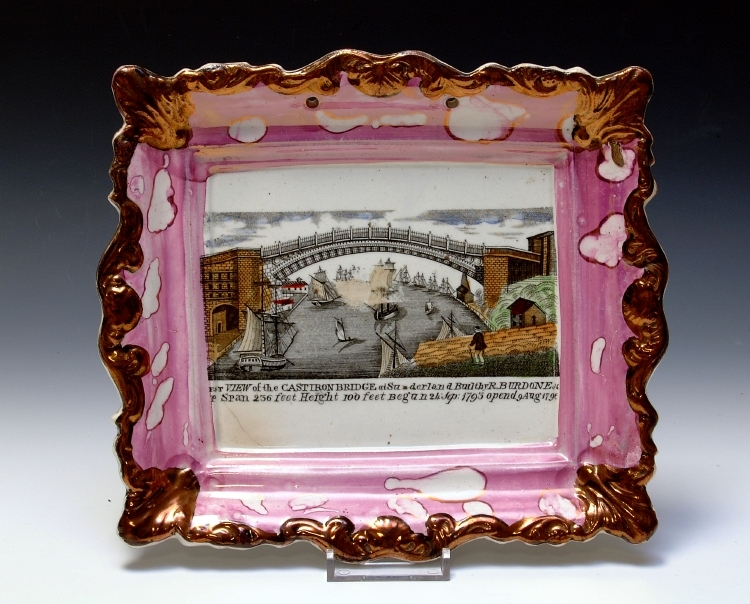
Commemorative plate, with pink 'splash lustre', depicting Wearmouth Bridge of 1796

By the middle of the century glassmaking was at its height on Wearside. James Hartley & Co., established in Sunderland in 1836, grew to be the largest glassworks in the country and (having patented an innovative production technique for rolled plate glass) produced much of the glass used in the construction of the Crystal Palace in 1851. A third of all UK-manufactured plate glass was produced at Hartley's by this time. Other manufacturers included the Cornhill Flint Glassworks (established at Southwick in 1865), which went on to specialise in pressed glass, as did the Wear Flint Glassworks (which had originally been established in 1697). In addition to the plate glass and pressed glass manufacturers there were 16 bottle works on the Wear in the 1850s, with the capacity to produce between 60 and 70,000 bottles a day.

Local potteries also flourished in the mid-19th century, again making use of raw materials (white clay and stone) being brought into Sunderland as ballast on ships. Sunderland pottery was exported across Europe, with Sunderland Lustreware proving particularly popular in the home market; however the industry sharply declined later in the century due to foreign competition, and the largest remaining manufacturer (Southwick Pottery) closed in 1897.

=== Victoria Hall Disaster ===
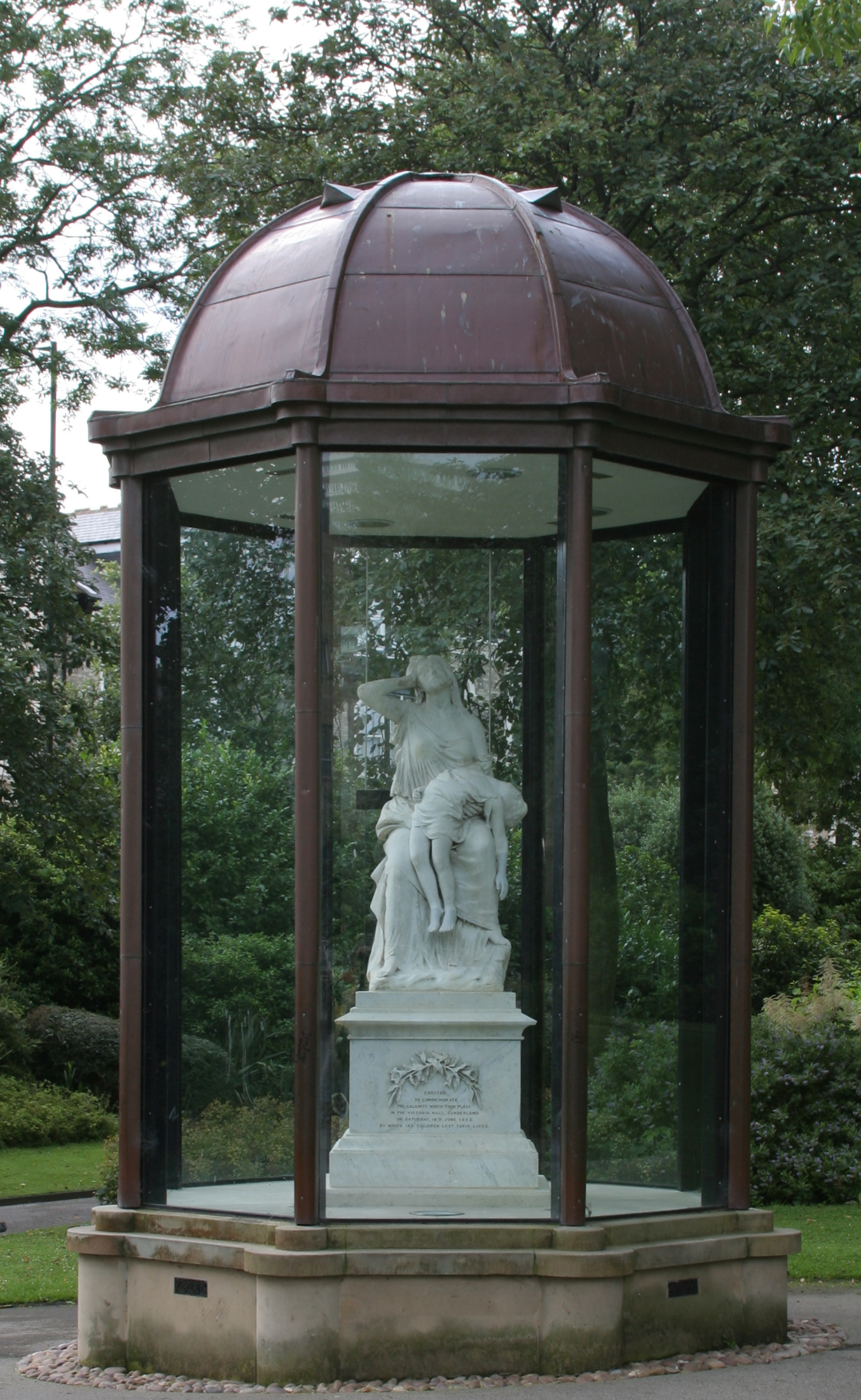
The memorial to the Victims of the Victoria Hall Disaster in Mowbray Park

Victoria Hall was a large concert hall on Toward Road facing Mowbray Park. The hall was the scene of a tragedy on 16 June 1883 when 183 children died. During a variety show, children rushed towards a staircase for treats. At the bottom of the staircase, the door had been opened inward and bolted in such a way as to leave only a gap wide enough for one child to pass at a time. The children surged down the stairs and those at the front were trapped and crushed by the weight of the crowd behind them.

The asphyxiation of 183 children aged between three and 14 is the worst disaster of its kind in British history. The memorial, a grieving mother holding a dead child, is located in Mowbray Park inside a protective canopy. Newspaper reports triggered a mood of national outrage and an inquiry recommended that public venues be fitted with a minimum number of outward opening emergency exits, which led to the invention of 'push bar' emergency doors. This law remains in force. Victoria Hall remained in use until 1941 when it was destroyed by a German bomb.

=== Lyceum Theatre ===
The Lyceum was a public building on Lambton Street, opened August 1852, whose many rooms included a Mechanics' Institute and a hall 90 by 40 feet (27 m × 12 m) which Edward D. Davis converted into a theatre, opened September 1854, then was gutted by fire in December the following year. It was refurbished and reopened in September 1856 as the Royal Lyceum Theatre, and is notable as the venue of Henry Irving's first successes. The building was destroyed by fire in 1880 and demolished. The site was later developed for the Salvation Army.

== 20th and 21st centuries ==
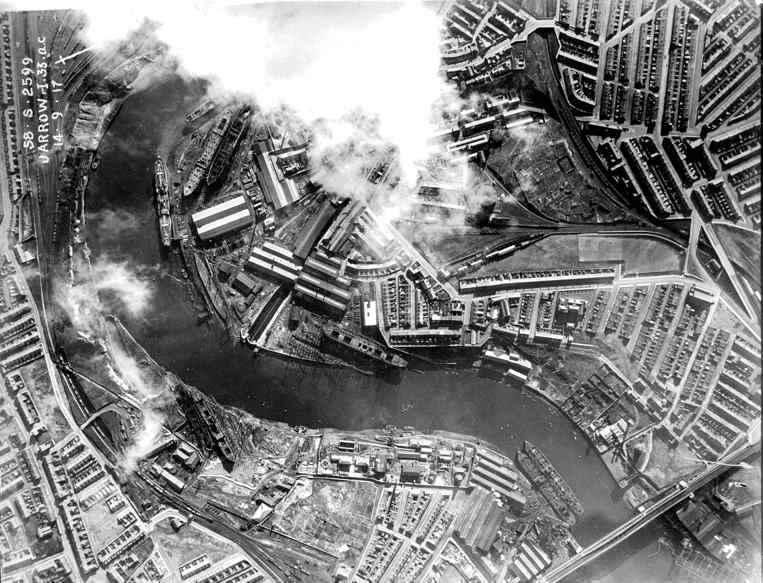
Sunderland in 1917

The public transport network was enhanced in 1900 – 1919 with an electric tram system. The trams were gradually replaced by buses during the 1940s before being completely axed in 1954. In 1909 the Queen Alexandra Bridge was built, linking Deptford and Southwick.

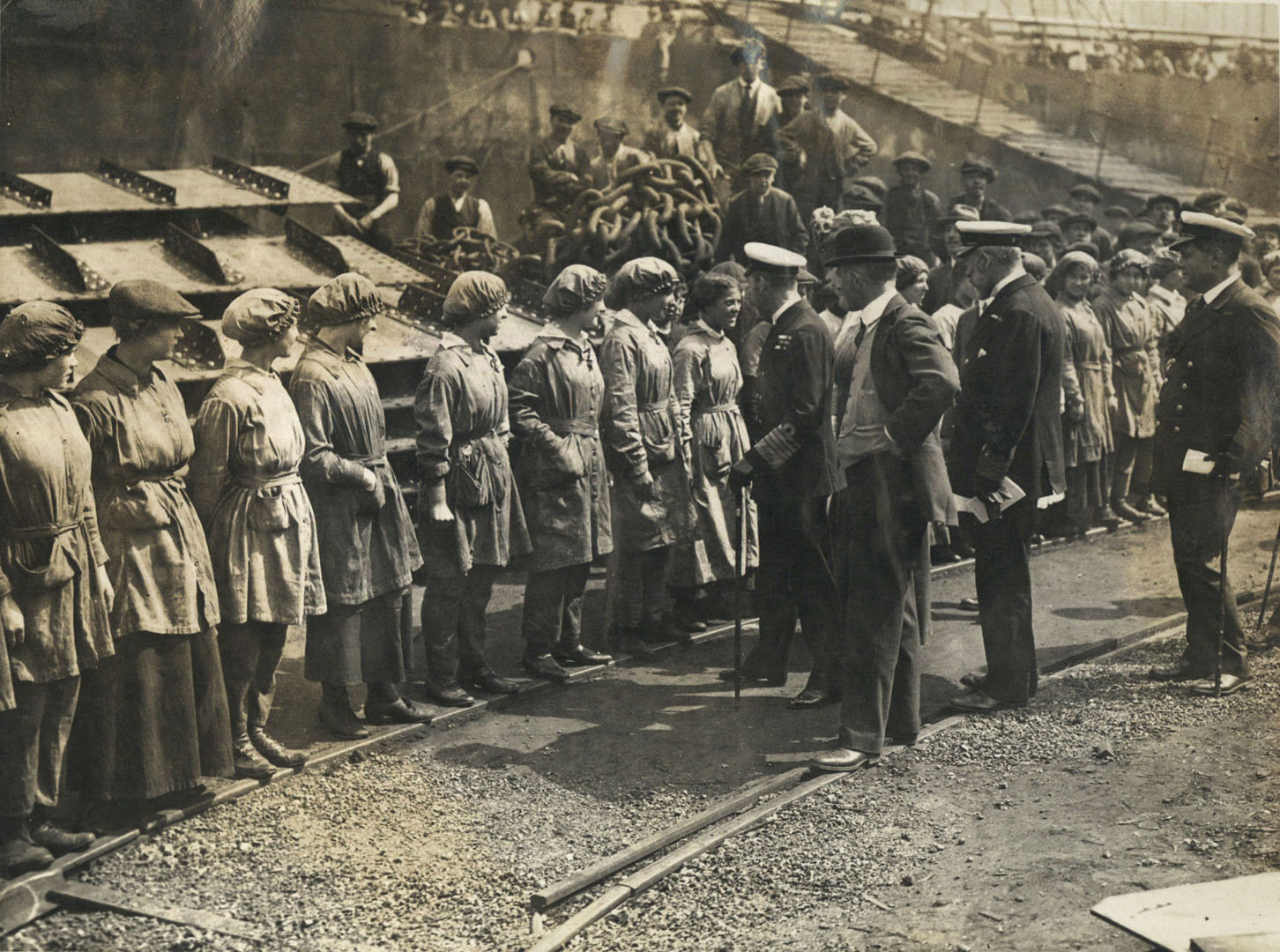
King George V visiting women workers at Sir James Laing & Sons shipyard, 15 June 1917

The First World War led to a notable increase in shipbuilding but also resulted in the town being targeted by a Zeppelin raid in 1916. The Monkwearmouth area was struck on 1 April 1916 and 22 lives were lost. Many citizens also served in the armed forces during this period, over 25,000 men from a population of 151,000.

In the wake of the First World War, and on through the Great Depression of the 1930s, shipbuilding dramatically declined: the number of shipyards on the Wear went from fifteen in 1921 to six in 1937. The small yards of J. Blumer & Son (at North Dock) and the Sunderland Shipbuilding Co. Ltd. (at Hudson Dock) both closed in the 1920s, and other yards were closed down by National Shipbuilders Securities in the 1930s (including Osbourne, Graham & Co., way upriver at North Hylton, Robert Thompson & Sons at Southwick, and the 'overflow' yards operated by Swan, Hunter & Wigham Richardson and William Gray & Co.).

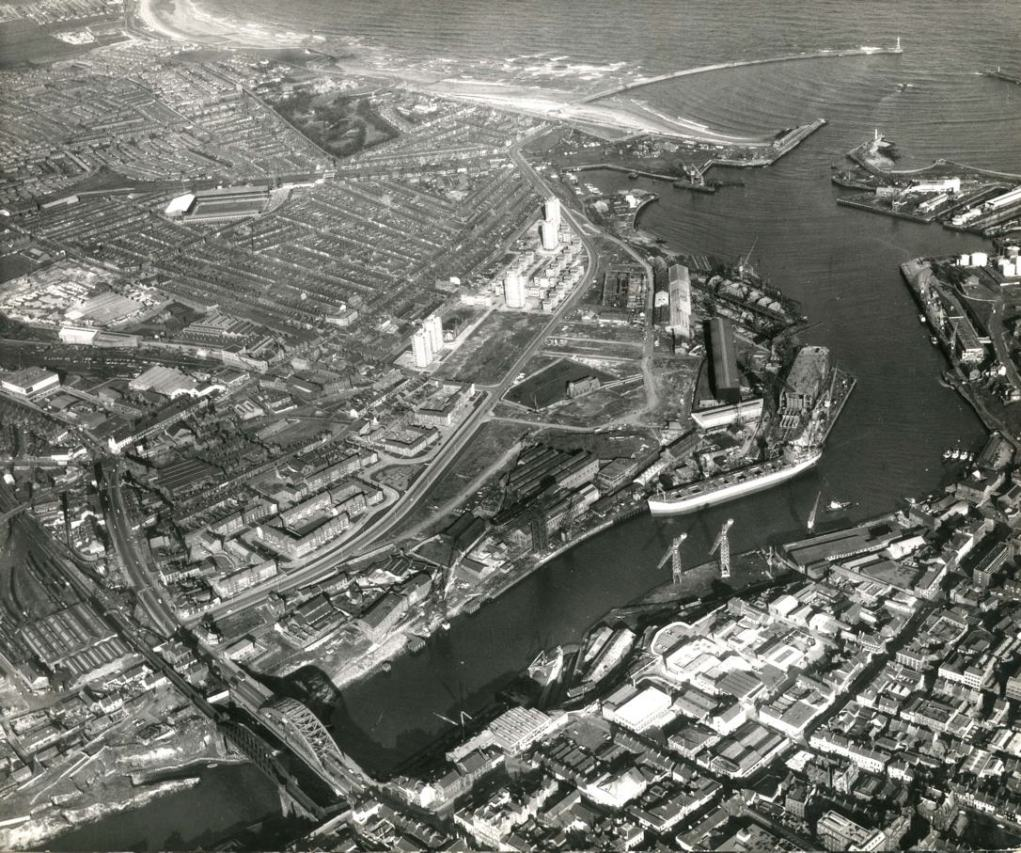
Sunderland viewed from above in 1967

With the outbreak of World War II in 1939, Sunderland was a key target of the German Luftwaffe, who claimed the lives of 267 people in the town, caused damage or destruction to 4,000 homes, and devastated local industry. After the war, more housing was developed. The town's boundaries expanded in 1967 when neighbouring Ryhope, Silksworth, Herrington, South Hylton and Castletown were incorporated into Sunderland.

During the second half of the 20th century shipbuilding and coalmining declined; shipbuilding ended in 1988 and coalmining in 1993. At the worst of the unemployment crisis up to 20 per cent of the local workforce were unemployed in the mid-1980s.

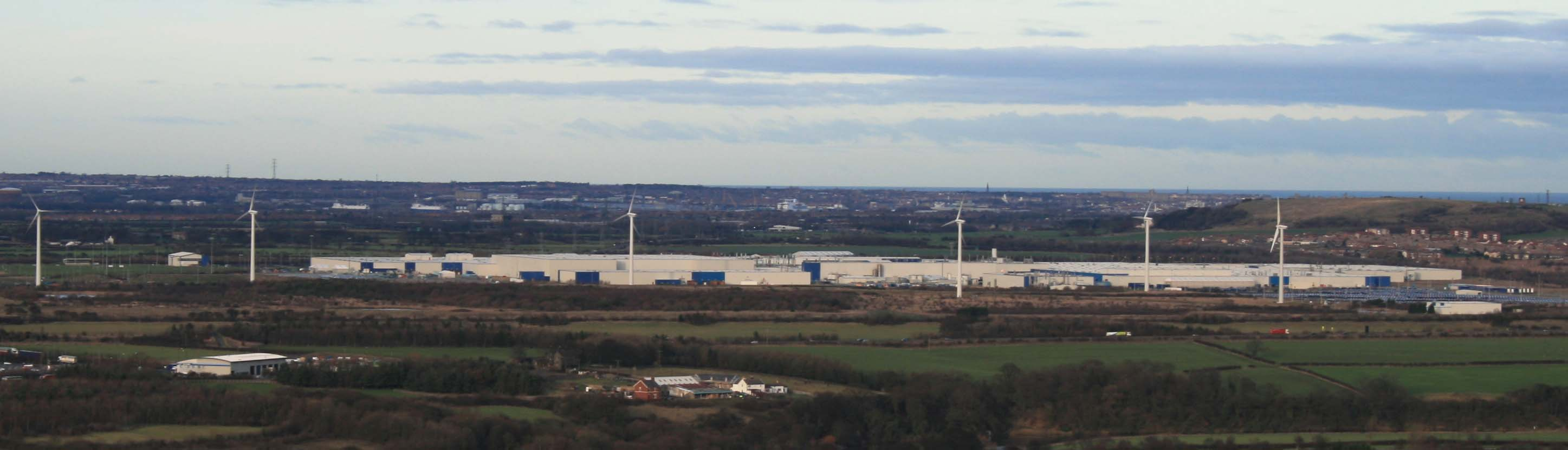
Nissan Motor Manufacturing UK Ltd in Sunderland. Factory complex, including wind turbines, taken from Penshaw Monument

As the former heavy industries declined, new industries were developed (including electronic, chemical, paper and motor manufacture) and the service sector expanded during the 1980s and 1990s. In 1986 Japanese car manufacturer Nissan opened its Nissan Motor Manufacturing UK factory in Washington, which has since become the UK's largest car factory.

From 1990, the banks of the Wear were regenerated with the creation of housing, retail parks and business centres on former shipbuilding sites. Alongside the creation of the National Glass Centre the University of Sunderland has built a new campus on the St Peter's site. The clearance of the Vaux Breweries site on the north west fringe of the city centre created a further opportunity for development in the city centre.

Sunderland received city status in 1992. Like many cities, Sunderland comprises a number of areas with their own distinct histories, Fulwell, Monkwearmouth, Roker, and Southwick on the northern side of the Wear, and Bishopwearmouth and Hendon to the south. On 24 March 2004, the city adopted Benedict Biscop as its patron saint.

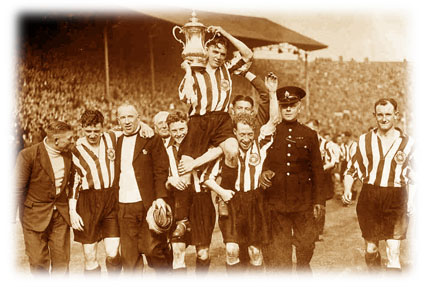
FA Cup winners, Wembley 1937

The 20th century saw Sunderland A.F.C. established as the Wearside area's greatest claim to sporting fame. Founded in 1879 as Sunderland and District Teachers A.F.C. by schoolmaster James Allan, Sunderland joined The Football League for the 1890–91 season. By 1936 the club had been league champions on five occasions. They won their first FA Cup in 1937, but their only post-World War II major honour came in 1973 when they won a second FA Cup. They have had a checkered history and dropped into the old third division for a season and been relegated thrice from the Premier League, twice with the lowest points ever, earning the club a reputation as a yo-yo club. After 99 years at the historic Roker Park stadium, the club moved to the 42,000-seat Stadium of Light on the banks of the River Wear in 1997. At the time, it was the largest stadium built by an English football club since the 1920s, and has since been expanded to hold nearly 50,000 seated spectators.

In 2018 Sunderland was ranked as the best city to live and work in the UK by the finance firm OneFamily. In the same year, Sunderland was ranked as one of the top 10 safest cities in the UK.

Many fine old buildings remain despite the bombing that occurred during World War II. Religious buildings include Holy Trinity Church, built in 1719 for an independent Sunderland, St Michael's Church, built as Bishopwearmouth Parish Church and now known as Sunderland Minster and St Peter's Church, Monkwearmouth, part of which dates from AD 674, and was the original monastery. St Andrew's Church, Roker, known as the "Cathedral of the Arts and Crafts Movement", contains work by William Morris, Ernest Gimson and Eric Gill. St Mary's Catholic Church is the earliest surviving Gothic revival church in the city.

Sunderland Civic Centre was designed by Spence Bonnington & Collins and was officially opened by Princess Margaret, Countess of Snowdon in 1970. It closed in November 2021, following the opening of a new City Hall on the former Vaux Brewery redevelopment site.
