= Keel Crossing =

Pedestrian and cycle footbridge in Sunderland, UK

- Coordinates: 54°54′37″N 1°23′14″W
- Carries: Pedestrians and cyclists
- Crosses: River Wear
- Locale: Sunderland, Tyne and Wear, England
- Owner: Sunderland City Council

Characteristics
- Total length: 260 metres (850 ft)
- Width: 10 metres (33 ft)
- Height: 30 metres (98 ft)

History
- Designer: Arup
- Constructed by: VolkerStevin (main contractor)
- Construction start: 2023 (approved)
- Construction end: 18 October 2025
- Construction cost: £31,000,000
- Opened: 18 October 2025

Location
- Interactive map of Keel Crossing

Keel Crossing is a pedestrian and cycle footbridge in Sunderland that first opened temporarily (for one day) on 22 August 2025 for the opening match of the 2025 Women's Rugby World Cup, opening permanently on 18 October 2025. It spans the River Wear, linking Keel Square in the city centre to the Sheepfolds neighbourhood on the north bank, near the Stadium of Light. The footbridge is part of the £500,000,000 Riverside Sunderland regeneration scheme and is intended to improve connectivity across the river, especially on Sunderland A.F.C. match days, by providing an alternative crossing to the Wearmouth Bridge. The bridge has a total span of about 260 metres (850 ft), stands roughly 30 metres (98 ft) above the river, and has a deck width of 10 metres (33 ft). The project cost is about £31,000,000. The bridge's official name, Keel Crossing, given on 11 June 2025, honours Sunderland’s shipbuilding heritage (the “keel” being the backbone of a ship).

== History ==
=== Planning and development ===
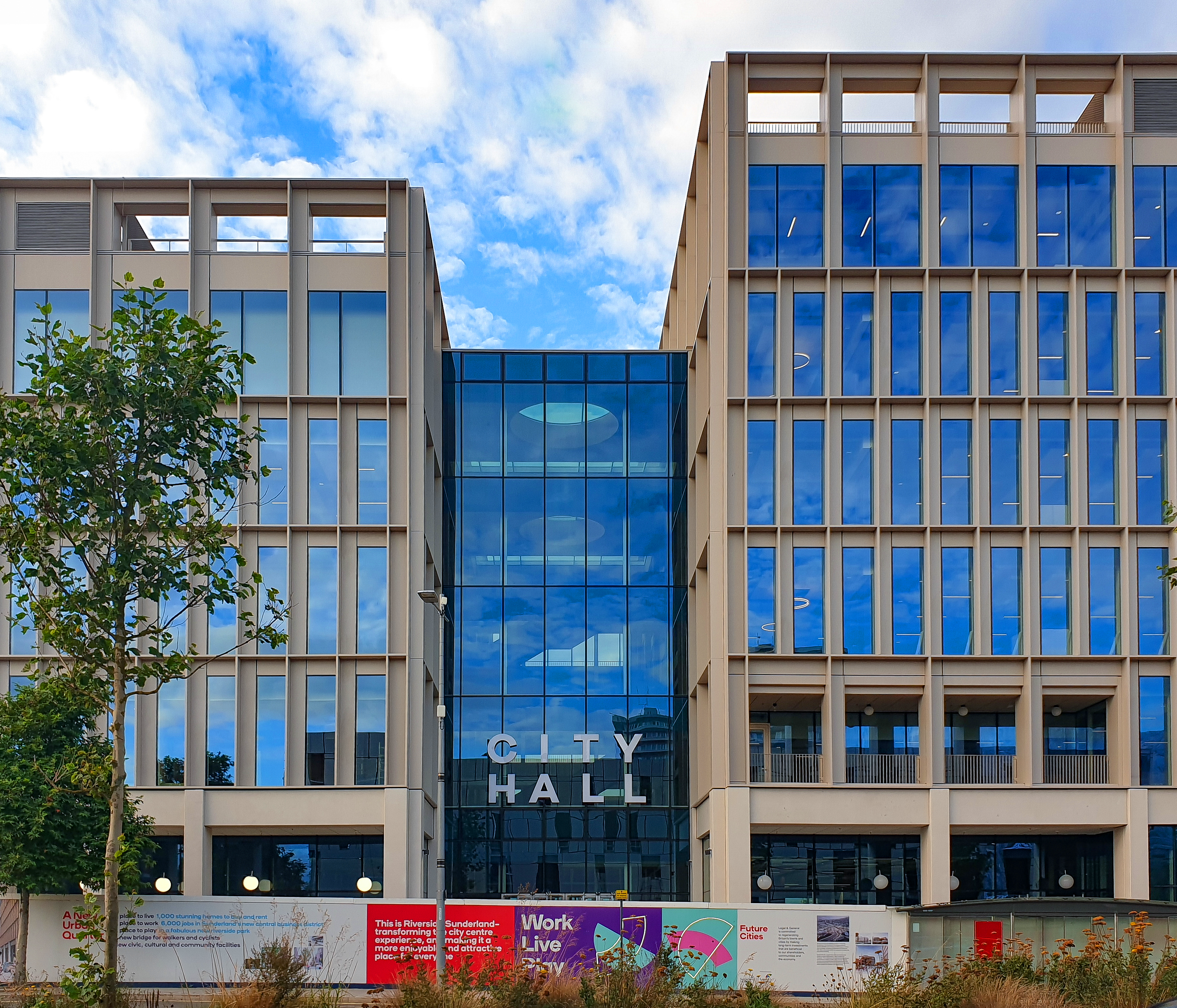
City Hall, Sunderland, the headquarters of Sunderland City Council

Plans for a new high-level footbridge in Sunderland were first unveiled in 2019 as part of the Riverside Sunderland urban renewal project. Outline planning consent was granted in 2021, and detailed designs were developed over the next two years. In August 2021, Sunderland City Council selected the construction firm VolkerStevin as the contractor to deliver the bridge, before approving the final scheme in early 2023. Council leaders emphasised that the bridge would connect the city centre to the Stadium of Light and unlock new housing north of the river.

=== Construction ===
Construction work began in 2023. Major structural segments were fabricated off-site in Ghent, Belgium. In late August 2024, the bridge's final steel sections had arrived at the Port of Sunderland, to be barged upriver to the site.

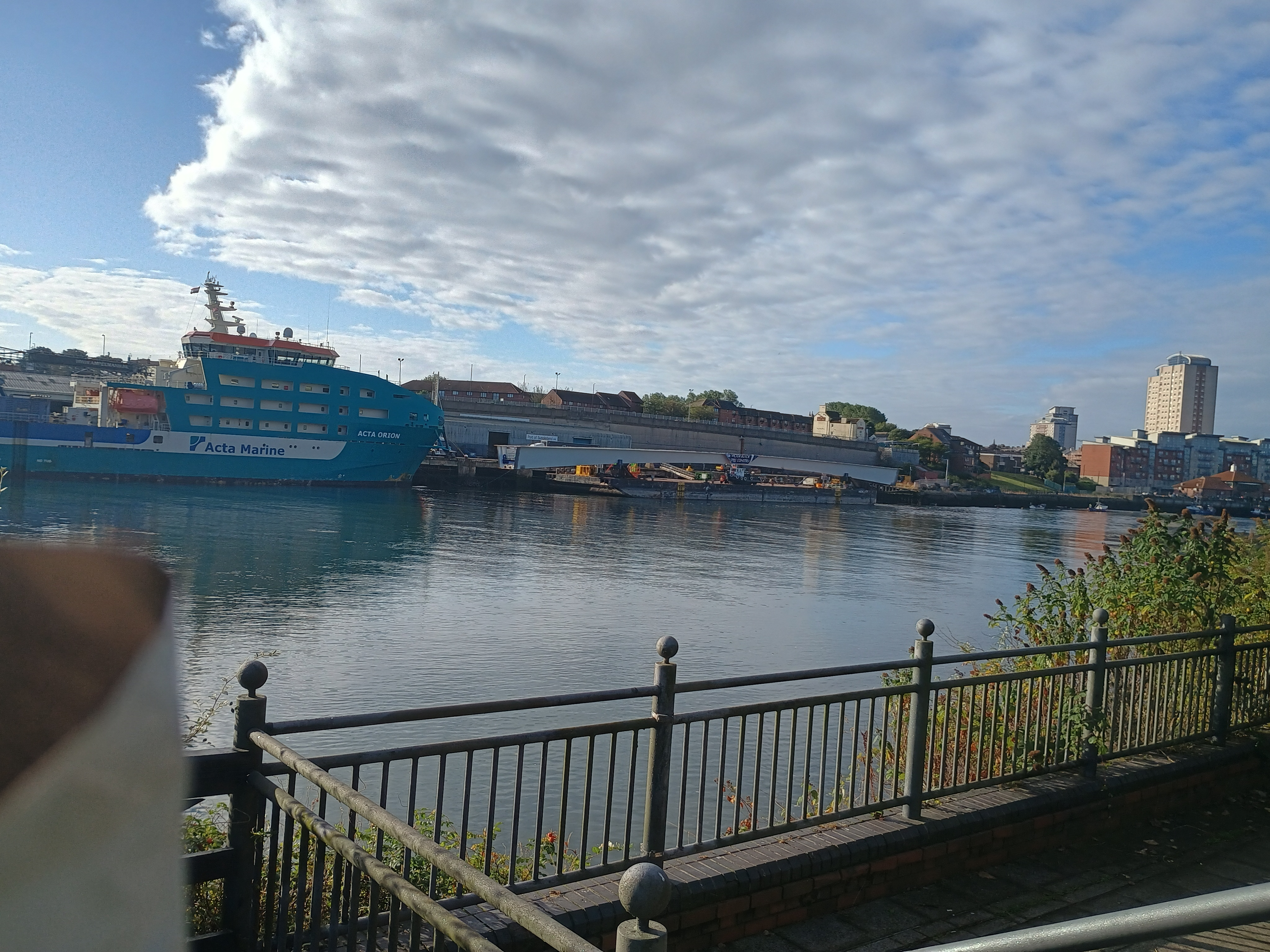
A view over the River Wear in September 2024 showing a section of the Keel Crossing footbridge on board a barge

On 16 September 2024, the final and largest 105-metre steel section was lifted into place, completing the main spanning structure. In the following months the construction team installed the remaining bridge sections and preparatory works. By December 2024, strand jacks used to lift the central span had been removed, and work on casting the concrete deck was underway. Throughout construction the bridge has been built by VolkerStevin on behalf of the city council, and VolkerStevin’s project leader noted that the challenging site required precise coordination of the heavy lifts and river operations.

=== Naming ===
In early 2025, Sunderland launched a public consultation to name the new bridge. Community groups and residents were invited to suggest names, which were narrowed down to three finalists by mid-2025. On 11 June 2025, the winning name was announced as Keel Crossing, following a public vote in which the name received over 55% of the votes. The council and media noted that “Keel Crossing” pays tribute to the city’s shipbuilding legacy and extends the Keel Line historic trail.

=== Temporary opening ===
On 22 August 2025, the bridge was temporarily opened for one day for fans going to the opening match of the 2025 Women's Rugby World Cup, which was held in the Stadium of Light and played by England and the USA. On the same day, the bridge's opening ceremony was led by the Mayor of Sunderland, councillor Ehthesham Haque, and former Sunderland A.F.C. goalkeeper Jimmy Montgomery. Those attending the opening ceremony became some of the first people to walk across the bridge. Opposition Conservative Party councillors criticised the £28,500 cost of the footbridge's temporary opening. However, the Labour Party council leader, Michael Mordey, said the event had a value to the city of over £20,000,000, much larger than the cost of the temporary opening.

=== Permanent opening ===
On 10 October 2025, Sunderland City Council announced the bridge would be permanently opened on 18 October. They said the opening would include entertainment and a fan parade before the Sunderland A.F.C. fixture against Wolverhampton Wanderers F.C. in the Premier League on the same day. The bridge's permanent opening went ahead on 18 October. Several former Sunderland players were present for fans to meet and greet before the bridge was formally permanently opened and This Is Wearside led the fan parade across the bridge.

== Design and specifications ==
The Keel Bridge is designed as a high-level box-steel footbridge for pedestrians and cyclists. Its total length is about 260 m, with the deck measuring 10 m across. The bridge deck sits approximately 30 m above the river level, allowing shipping to pass underneath. The steel structure was fabricated in four sections in Belgium by Victor Buyck. It weighs around 1,150 tonnes in total. These sections were transported by sea to Sunderland, where a heavy-lift operation (handled by Mammoet) barged them to the site and lifted them into place using strand-jack hydraulic systems.

Once assembled, the bridge’s prefabricated steel skeleton was fitted with concrete deck panels, safety barriers, and lighting. The structure incorporates architectural and ambient lighting to enhance its appearance at night, and the council has indicated plans for interactive features, such as augmented reality points, to celebrate local heritage. The overall budget for the footbridge is about £31 million, funded by Sunderland City Council as part of the wider regeneration scheme.

== Route and purpose ==
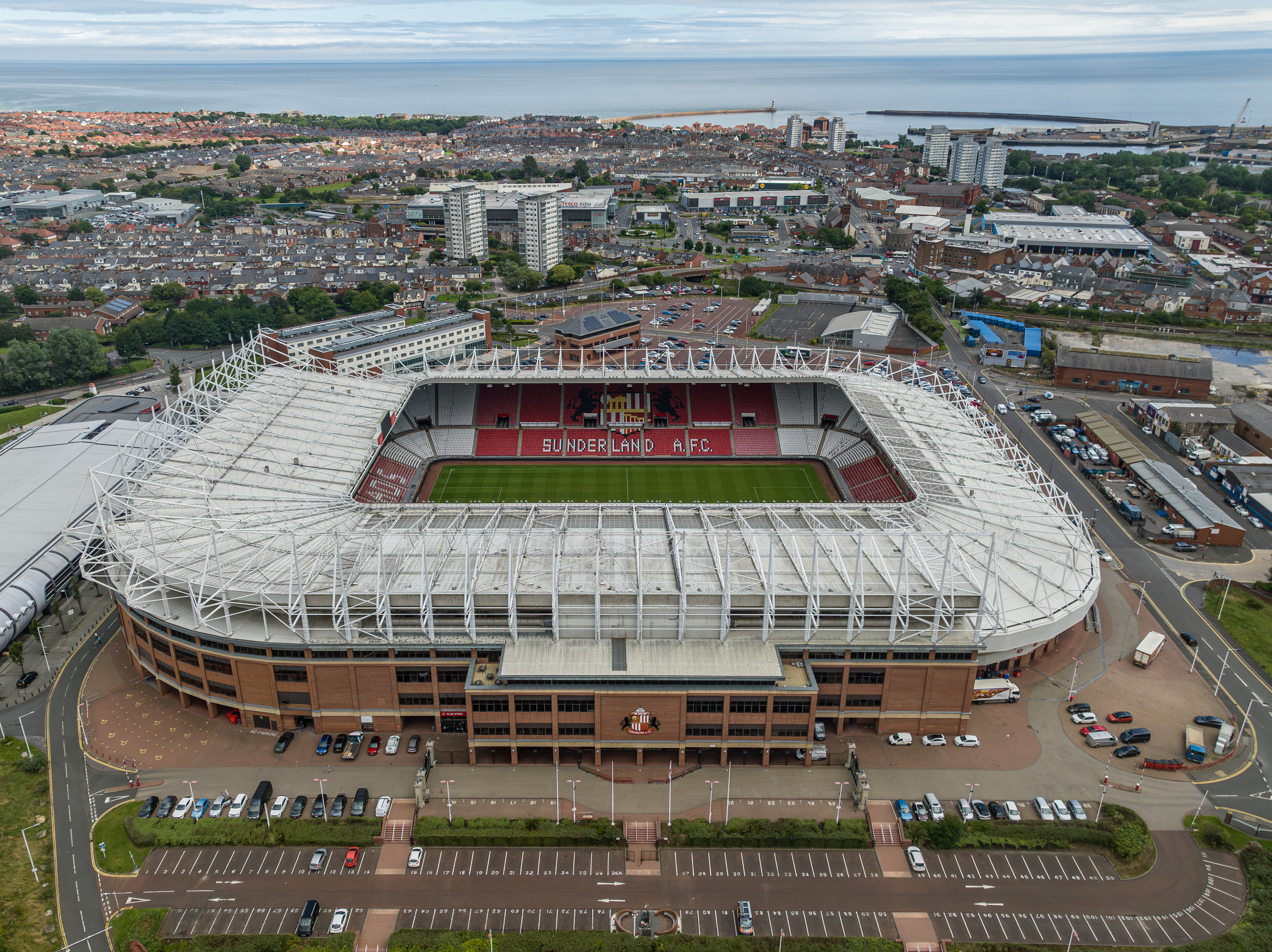
An aerial view of the Stadium of Light

The Keel Bridge crosses the River Wear, linking two key parts of Sunderland. On the south (city centre) side it connects at Keel Square (near the city hall and historic Keel Line art installation). On the north bank it lands near the Sheepfolds neighbourhood, giving direct access to the Stadium of Light (home of Sunderland A.F.C.) and adjacent development sites. The bridge provides a new pedestrian and cycle route between the city centre and the stadium area. Officials hope it will ease congestion on Wearmouth Bridge and create a “Wembley Way”–style procession of fans on matchdays.

As part of the Riverside Sunderland redevelopment, the bridge is intended to catalyse growth on both sides of the river. It opens up 32 hectares of riverside land for mixed-use development, including new homes, offices and leisure facilities. By improving access to the Stadium of Light and connecting Keel Square to the emerging northern district, the bridge aims to “extend the city centre footprint” and knit together the many projects in the regeneration masterplan.
