= Offerton =

Offerton may refer to:

- Offerton, Derbyshire
- Offerton, Greater Manchester
  - Offerton (Stockport electoral ward)
- Offerton, Tyne and Wear
