= Keel Square =

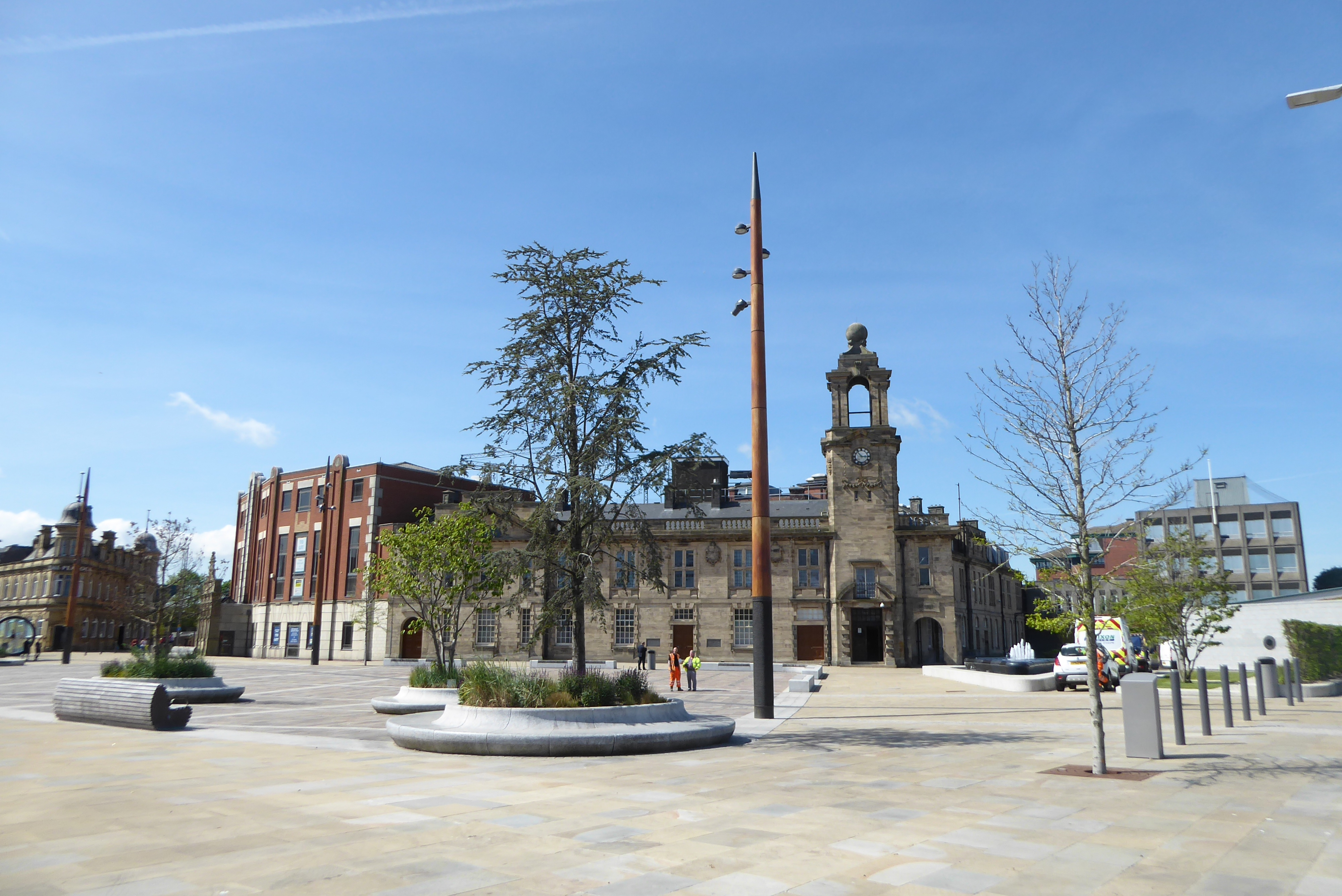
- Keel Square in 2017

- Location within Tyne and Wear

General information
- Type: City Square
- Location: Sunderland, Tyne and Wear, England
- Coordinates: 54.907878°N 1.386170°W
- Construction started: June 2014
- Completed: May 2015
- Cost: £11.8 Million
- Owner: Sunderland City Council

Design and construction
- Architects: Kevin Johnson, Stephen Broadbent

Keel Square is a public space and boulevard based in Sunderland, Tyne & Wear, completed in 2015. Located to the north of the City Centre opposite the Vaux Site, the square was constructed as part of the larger St. Mary's Way redevelopment. The total cost of the project amounts to £11.8 million. A celebration of Sunderland's maritime and industrial heritage, the square's name was decided by the city's residents.

== Design ==
The Keel Line, remembering the shipbuilders of Sunderland and the ships built upon the river wear

Keel Square was designed by Sunderland City Council’s in-house multi-disciplinary team led by Principal Landscape Architect Kevin Johnson. The central purpose of the square is to celebrate Sunderland's Maritime and Industrial Heritage. Thus to build upon such, the square was constructed predominantly out of sandstone, granite and bronze.

Additionally, the square was constructed to supplement the neighbouring Vaux Site in order to create a more attractive business environment in the city As Sunderland Council Leader Paul Watson Quoted:

In creating the new city centre public space we saw the opportunity to celebrate Sunderland’s shipbuilding and industrial heritage

— Paul Watson, Sunderland Echo, October 15, 2013

In 2025, a new pedestrian and bicycle bridge called the Keel Crossing was constructed to link Keel Square to the Sheepfolds neighborhood and the Stadium of Light.

The square hosts a unique public art feature to embed the industrial past, known as “The Keel Line”. The start of the line is marked by the sculpture “Propellers of the City” designed by Stephen Broadbent, containing names of those who worked in the Wear shipyards. “The Keel Line” structure represents the length of the Naess Crusade, the largest ship ever launched on the Wear. It is further aligned by a strip of paving listing over 8,100 ships launched on the Wear and incorporate a series of illustrations recording the history of Sunderland by renowned graphic artist Bryan Talbot.

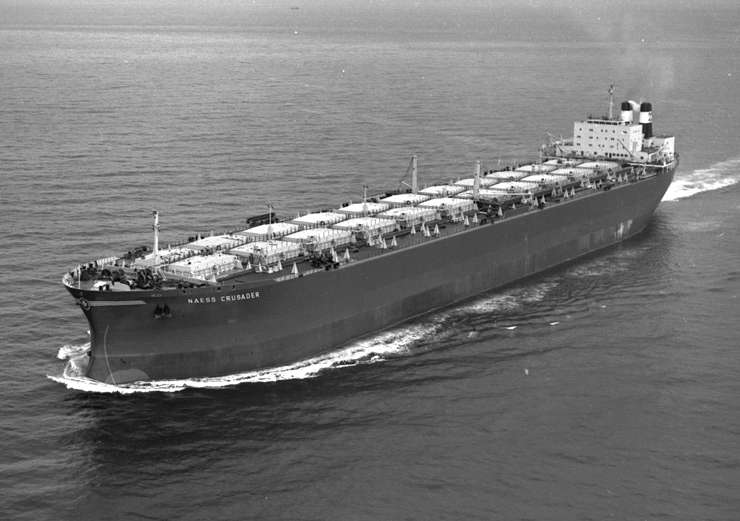
The Naess Crusader, the largest ship build on the Wear and the basis for the length of the Keel Line.

== Controversy and criticism ==
The new square has attracted considerable controversy and criticism, largely relating to the costs of the project. Conservative opposition councillors in Sunderland criticised the excess amount of money spent upon the project. Additionally, the council were further criticised over the project for spending £180,000 on imported trees from the Netherlands to place in the corresponding boulevard.
