= Vaux Site =

Development area in Sunderland, Tyne and Wear, England

The Vaux Site
- Location within Tyne and Wear

General information
- Location: Sunderland, Tyne and Wear, England
- Coordinates: 54.907878°N 1.386170°W
- Construction started: December 2016
- Cost: £100 million
- Owner: Carillion

Design and construction
- Architect: Fielden Clegg Bradley Studios (phase one)

The Vaux Site is an area of brownfield land in the centre of Sunderland, Tyne and Wear currently undergoing development. The area of the former Vaux Breweries until its closure in 1999, the council are recreating the site in a multi-million pound joint venture with Carillion. The development will create up to 19 new buildings for leisure, retail, living and office purposes. Phase one of construction started in 2016 with work on a series of offices valued at £25 million

== History ==
Vaux Breweries closed in 1999, leaving the site vacant. Whilst Sunderland City Council aspired to redevelop the site, in 2001 the land was acquired by Tesco who sought to create a hypermarket on it. The situation generated a legal row which lasted until 2011 and the Urban Regeneration Company - Sunderland arc fought the case for the City. Partners such as the Regional Development Agency, One Northeast and national agency, Homes England were instrumental in the successful conclusion that ended with Sunderland Council obtaining ownership over the site. In 2014, the council created a joint venture in partnership with Carillion to redevelop the land. This coincided with the creation of Keel Square, designed to supplement the site.

In January 2018, Carillion collapsed. However, new contractors took over the development and work continued. At the end of the year, the first office building known as "the beam" was completed and now hosts several companies including the food delivery firm Ocado. This was then followed by the creation of the New City Hall in 2020, which is now in the final stages of completion.

In 2021, plans for a new eye infirmary unit on the site were revealed, and as of October 2025 construction work is underway.

On 18 October 2025, Keel Crossing, a new footbridge connecting the Vaux Site to Sheepfolds and the Stadium of Light opened permanently.

== See also ==
- Keel Square
- Vaux Bridge
