= Offerton, Tyne and Wear =

Coordinates: 54.88°N 01.47°W

Offerton
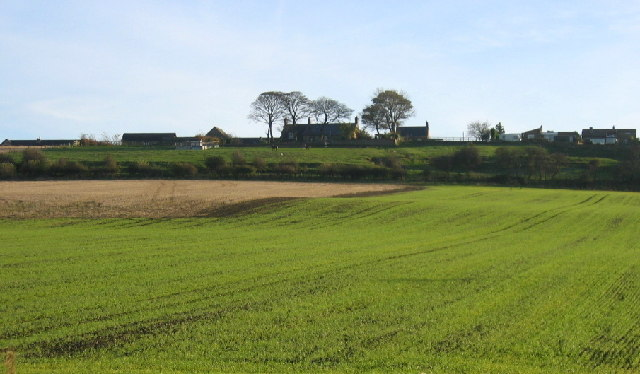

- Location within Tyne and Wear
- OS grid reference: NZ3455
- Metropolitan borough: Sunderland
- Metropolitan county: Tyne and Wear
- Region: North East
- Country: England
- Sovereign state: United Kingdom
- Post town: Sunderland
- Dialling code: 0191
- Police: Northumbria
- Fire: Tyne and Wear
- Ambulance: North East

Offerton is a hamlet in the Sunderland district of Tyne and Wear, England. It is situated about 4 miles (6.4 km) west of Sunderland city centre.

== History ==
Offerton was historically a township in the ancient parish of Houghton-le-Spring in County Durham. It became a separate civil parish in 1866. In 1961 the parish had a population of 133.

Offerton civil parish was abolished in 1967. Most of the area, including the hamlet itself, became part of the urban district of Houghton-le-Spring, with a smaller part being added to the County Borough of Sunderland. The urban district was in turn abolished seven years later in 1974, when the area was transferred to the enlarged district of Sunderland in the new metropolitan county of Tyne and Wear. No successor parish was created for the former urban district and Offerton is therefore directly administered by Sunderland City Council.
