= Sunderland Town Hall =

Municipal building in Sunderland, Tyne and Wear, England

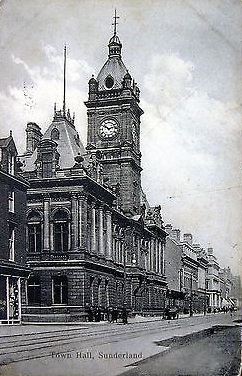
- Sunderland Town Hall

- Shown in Tyne and Wear
- 54.9057°N 1.3818°W
- Location: Sunderland

History
- Built: 1890
- Demolished: 1971

Site notes
- Architect: Brightwen Binyon
- Architectural style: Italianate style

Sunderland Town hall was a municipal building in Fawcett Street in Sunderland, Tyne and Wear, England. It was the headquarters of Sunderland Borough Council until November 1970.

== History ==
After Sunderland became a municipal borough in 1835, civic leaders initially held their meetings in the Exchange Building on High Street East which had served as the local market hall as well as the courthouse since it was completed in 1814. Following the expansion of the borough council's responsibilities in the latter half of the 19th century, civic leaders decided to procure a purpose-built town hall. In 1874, a design competition was held based on a site in Mowbray Park. The design the committee most liked was that drawn up by Frank Caws, but his design was disqualified for exceeding the budgeted cost. A new design competition was held based on a site in Fawcett Street: this competition was judged by Alfred Waterhouse and won by the little known architect, Brightwen Binyon, who had worked in Waterhouse's office, leading to accusations of corruption.

The foundation stone for the new building was laid by the mayor, Councillor Edwin Richardson, on 29 September 1887. It was designed by Brightwen Binyon in the Italianate style, was built by John and Thomas Tillman at a cost of around £50,000 and was officially opened by the mayor, Councillor Robert Shadforth, on 6 November 1890.

The design involved a symmetrical main frontage of thirteen bays facing onto Fawcett Street. The central bay, which was slightly projected forward, featured a round headed doorway, flanked by brackets supporting a balcony; there was a rounded headed French door on the first floor flanked by two pairs of Corinthian order columns supporting an entablature and a small pediment. Behind that, there was a two-stage clock tower with a small segmental pedimented window in the first stage and clock faces in the second stage, all surmounted by a balustrade, corner finials, an ogee-shaped dome and a weather vane. The wing sections of three bays each, which were rusticated on the ground floor, were fenestrated by square-headed sash windows with voussoirs on the ground floor, by round headed windows on the first floor and by segmental pedimented windows at attic level. The end sections of three bays each, which were rusticated on the ground floor and slightly projected forward, were fenestrated by square-headed sash windows with voussoirs on the ground floor, by round headed windows on the first floor and by segmental pedimented Venetian windows at attic level. The first floor windows in the end sections were flanked by Corinthian order columns supporting entablatures and modillioned cornices. Behind the attic windows there were mansard roofs with cresting. Internally, the principal room was the council chamber on the first floor which was approached by a grand staircase and an ornate landing.

The Prince of Wales visited the town hall while on a tour of the local area on 3 July 1930. It was set alight by German bombing on 9 April 1941 during the Second World War, and, at the end of the war, the mayor proclaimed victory from the steps of the building.

By the 1960s, the town hall in Fawcett Street was deemed too small; civic leaders decided to procure a new building and relocated to a new civic centre in November 1970. After the borough council had rejected all proposals for alternative use of the town hall in Fawcett Street, it was demolished in 1971. The bells were recovered from the clock tower and stored in "secure storage" for posterity. Several proposals to build a luxury hotel on the site were considered but none came to fruition. A building known as Cassaton House, with retail units on the ground floor and student accommodation on the upper floors, was eventually erected on the site.
