= Sunderland Civic Centre =

Municipal building in Sunderland, Tyne and Wear, England

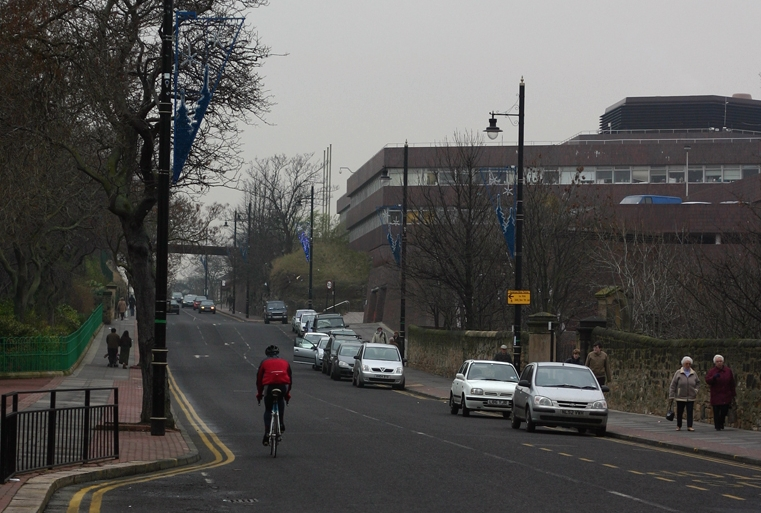
- Sunderland Civic Centre

- Shown in Tyne and Wear
- 54.9013°N 1.3822°W
- Location: Sunderland

History
- Built: 1970

Site notes
- Architect: Spence Bonnington & Collins
- Architectural style: Modern style

Sunderland Civic Centre was a municipal building in the Burdon Road in Sunderland, Tyne and Wear, England. It was the headquarters of Sunderland City Council until November 2021.

== History ==
The building was commissioned to replace Sunderland Town Hall which by the 1960s, was considered too small. Civic leaders decided to procure a new civic centre: the site they selected had previously been occupied by a residential area known as West Park. Construction of the civic centre started in January 1968. It was designed by Spence Bonnington & Collins in the Modern style, built at a cost of £3.4 million and was officially opened by Princess Margaret, Countess of Snowdon on 5 November 1970.

The design for the new low-rise building, which made extensive use of red brick, involved two connected hexagons arranged on a north–south axis: there were continuous rows of glazing with brickwork above and below on each of the floors throughout the complex. The civic suite, which contained the council chamber, jutted out of the main building to the south west. The windows in the building had metal curtains which were inspired by those in the Four Seasons Restaurant in New York which rippled from the air released from concealed ventilation ducts. The design received a gold award from the Royal Institute of British Architects as well as a Civic Trust Award.

The building continued to serve as the headquarters of Sunderland Borough Council and became the local seat of government of the enlarged Sunderland Metropolitan District Council in 1974. After Sunderland received city status in 1992, Queen Elizabeth II, accompanied by the Duke of Edinburgh, visited the civic centre and unveiled the city's new coat of arms on 18 May 1993.

A large stained glass window, designed by Dan Savage to commemorate the 25th anniversary of the UK miners' strike, was installed above the entrance to the council chamber and unveiled by the general secretary of the Durham Miners' Association, David Hopper, on 5 March 2010.

The local authority said the civic centre was too big and extensive to maintain: it proposed demolition of the civic centre and re-use of the site for housing. Consequently, in October 2019 construction work commenced on a new City Hall on the former Vaux Breweries site. In January 2021 The Guardian listed the Civic Centre as one of Britain's Brutalist buildings most at risk of demolition and development. It was included in Brutal North: Post-War Modernist Architecture in the North of England, Simon Phipps's photographic study of Brutalist architecture. Demolition of the civic centre began in October 2022 and was completed in June 2023.
