= City Hall, Sunderland =

Municipal building in Sunderland, Tyne and Wear, England

City Hall
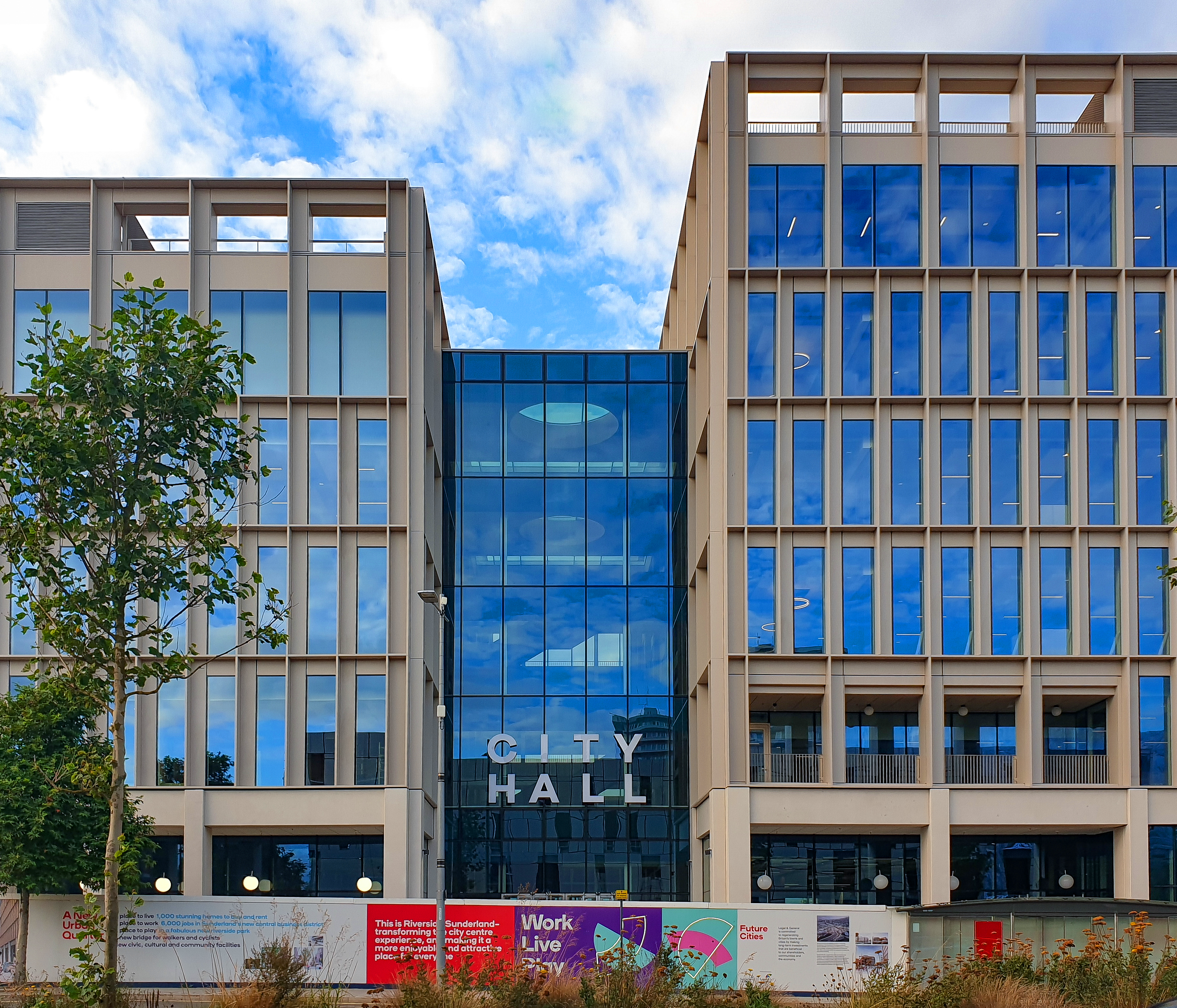
- City Hall nearing completion in 2021

- Location within Tyne and Wear

General information
- Type: City Hall
- Location: Sunderland, Tyne and Wear, England
- Coordinates: 54.907878°N 1.386170°W
- Construction started: 2019
- Completed: September 2021
- Cost: £42 Million
- Owner: Sunderland City Council

Design and construction
- Architect: FaulknerBrowns Architects
- Engineer: Cundall

City Hall is a municipal building in Sunderland, Tyne and Wear, England. It is located on the Vaux Site, adjacent to Keel Square, and was opened in November 2021. It is the headquarters of Sunderland City Council.

== History ==
The new building was commissioned to replace the old Sunderland Civic Centre which had been the home of the council since 1970. The council estimated that it would cost £5 million to refurbish the old civic centre and therefore decided to procure a new structure instead.

Construction of the new glass and steel structure started in November 2019. It was designed by FaulknerBrowns and built by Bowmer + Kirkland at a cost of £42 million. The development was financed by Legal & General as part of a larger programme of investment in the city totalling £100 million. The design includes two office blocks, one of five storeys and the other of six storeys, connected by a glass atrium, facing onto St Mary's Way. The total area covered by the building is 190,000 square feet (18,000 m^{2}). The contractual arrangements envisaged some areas being made available to accommodate the housing provider, Gentoo, and the Department for Work and Pensions as well as Sunderland City Council.

Progress was delayed by two months because of the COVID-19 pandemic but recommenced in May 2020. However, the topping out of the building was completed by civic leaders in August 2020, and it opened to the public on 29 November 2021.
