= Sunderland City Council =

Local authority of Sunderland, England

Type
- Type: Metropolitan borough council

Leadership
- Mayor: Robert Hutchinson, Reform UK since 20 May 2026
- Leader: Chris Eynon, Reform UK since 20 May 2026
- Chief Executive: Patrick Melia since August 2018

Structure
- Seats: 75 councillors
- Graph of the party split among 75 seats.
- Political groups: Administration (57) Reform (57) Other parties (18) Liberal Democrats (12) Labour (5) Independent (1)
- Joint committees: North East Mayoral Combined Authority

Elections
- Voting system: First past the post
- Last election: 7 May 2026
- Next election: 6 May 2027

Motto
- Nil desperandum auspice deo

Meeting place
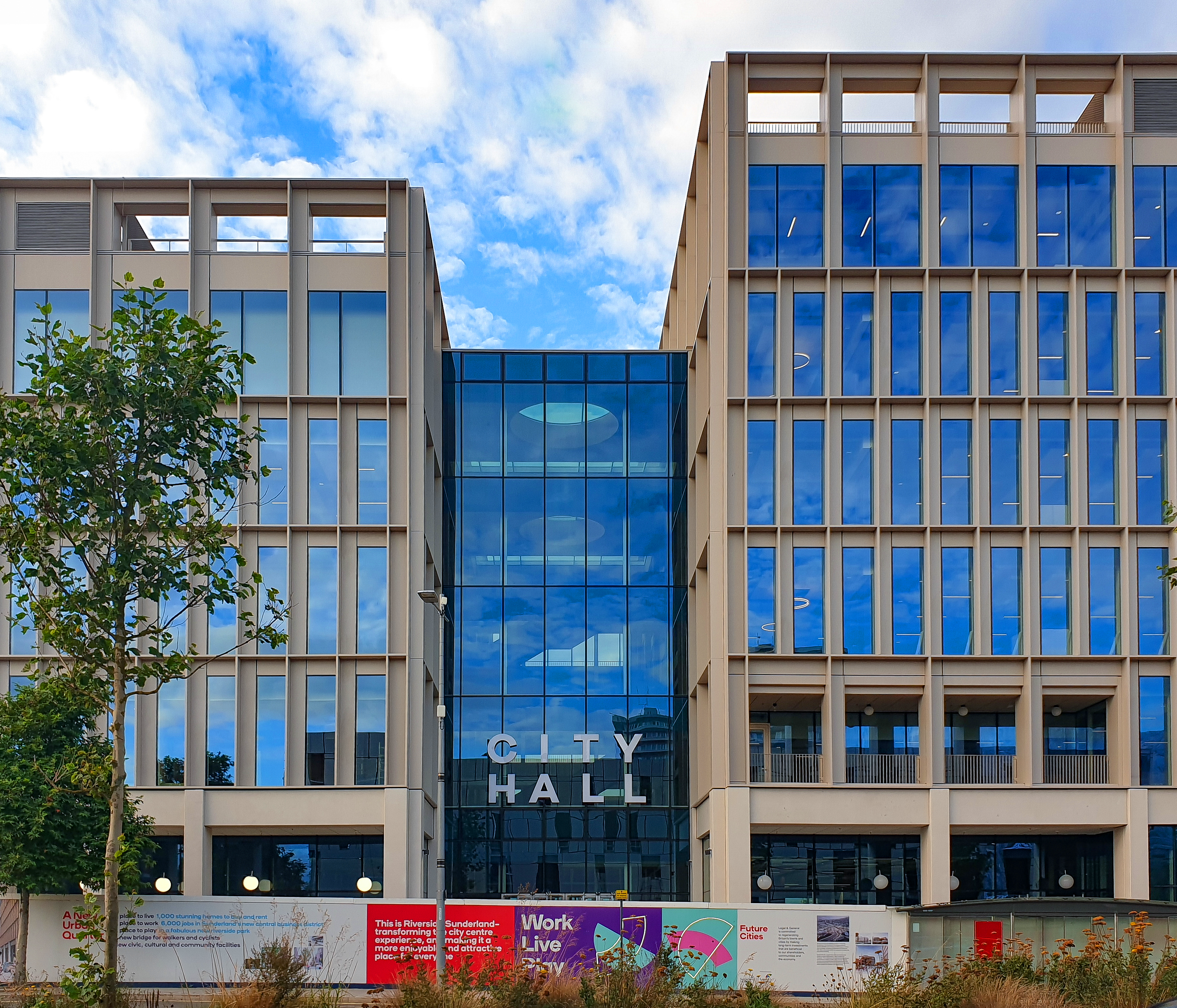
- City Hall, Plater Way, Sunderland, SR1 3AA

Website
- www.sunderland.gov.uk

Sunderland City Council is the local authority of Sunderland, a metropolitan borough with city status in the ceremonial county of Tyne and Wear in North East England. It is one of five such councils in Tyne and Wear and one of 36 in England. It provides the majority of local government services in Sunderland.

The council has been under Reform UK control since May 2026, having previously been under Labour majority control since the formation of the metropolitan borough in 1974. It is based at City Hall on Plater Way. The council is a member of the North East Combined Authority.

== History ==
The town of Sunderland was an ancient borough, having been given its first charter (as 'Wearmouth') in 1179. A subsequent charter of 1634 incorporated the town under the name of Sunderland, which had become the more commonly used name.

Sunderland was reformed to become a municipal borough in 1836 under the Municipal Corporations Act 1835, which standardised how most boroughs operated across the country. It was then governed by a body formally called the "mayor, aldermen and burgesses of the borough of Sunderland", generally known as the corporation or town council. When elected county councils were established in 1889, Sunderland was considered large enough for its existing council to provide county-level services, and so it was made a county borough, independent from the new Durham County Council. The borough boundaries were enlarged on several occasions.

In 1974 the county borough was replaced by a larger metropolitan borough within the new county of Tyne and Wear. From 1974 until 1986 the borough council was a lower-tier district authority, with Tyne and Wear County Council providing county-level services. The county council was abolished in 1986, since when the borough council has again provided both district-level and county-level services, as it had done when it was a county borough prior to 1974. Some functions are provided across Tyne and Wear by joint committees with the other districts. The borough was awarded city status in 1992, allowing the council to change its name to Sunderland City Council.

== Governance ==
Since 1986 the council has provided both district-level and county-level functions, with some services being provided through joint arrangements with the other Tyne and Wear councils. In 2024 a combined authority was established covering Sunderland, County Durham, Gateshead, Newcastle upon Tyne, North Tyneside, Northumberland and South Tyneside, called the North East Combined Authority. It is chaired by the directly elected Mayor of the North East and oversees the delivery of certain strategic functions across the area.

There are civil parishes at Hetton, Burdon and Warden Law, of which only Hetton has a parish council. Parish councils form an additional tier of local government for their areas. Apart from the aforementioned areas, the rest of the borough is unparished. The ward boundaries of Hetton Town Council have also been modified. This comes as part of the larger review of Sunderland ward boundaries for the 2026 council election.

=== Political composition ===
The council has been under Reform majority control since the 2026 election. Prior to that election it had been under Labour majority control since the formation of the modern council in 1974. While Labour's majority on the council had been consistent from its creation, the opposition party had traditionally been the Conservative Party before they fell behind the Liberal Democrats at recent elections.

Party in control	Years
Labour	1974–2026
Reform	2026–present

=== Leadership ===
The role of Mayor of Sunderland is largely ceremonial. Political leadership is instead provided by the leader of the council. The first leader of the metropolitan borough council, Charles Slater, had been the last leader of the old Sunderland Town Council. As of its formation in May 2024, the leader of Sunderland City Council has sat on the cabinet of the North East Combined Authority. The leaders of the council since 1974 have been:

Councillor	Party	From	To
Charles Slater	Labour	1 April 1974	Nov 1990
Eric Bramfitt	Labour	Dec 1990	Apr 1994
Bryn Sidaway	Labour	May 1994	May 1999
Colin Anderson	Labour	May 1999	May 2002
Bob Symonds	Labour	May 2002	May 2008
Paul Watson	Labour	14 May 2008	Nov 2017
Harry Trueman	Labour	7 March 2018	16 May 2018
Graeme Miller	Labour	16 May 2018	20 May 2024
Michael Mordey	Labour Co-op	20 May 2024	May 2026
Chris Eynon	Reform	20 May 2026	

== Elections ==
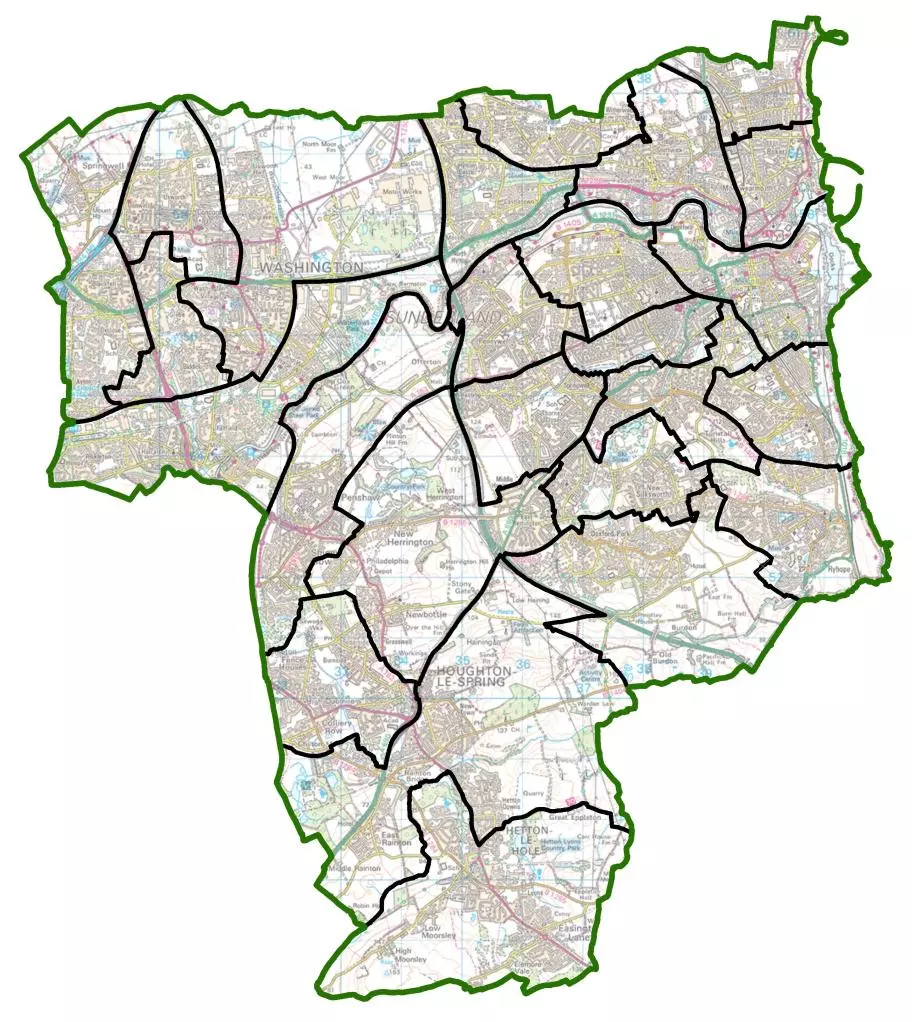
Wards within the Sunderland City Council area

Since the last changes to ward boundaries took effect in 2026, the council has comprised 75 councillors, representing 25 wards, with each ward electing three councillors. Elections are held three years out of every four, with a third of the council (one councillor for each ward) elected each time for a four-year term of office.

== Wards and councillors ==
Sunderland's 25 wards are each represented by three elected councillors, which at October 2026 were as follows:

Current Sunderland City Councillors
Ward	Councillors	Elected Until
Barnes and Thornhill	Ehthesham Haque	2030
Barnes and Thornhill	Caroline Comer	2028
Barnes and Thornhill	Fiona Tobin	2027
Deptford and Hendon	David Barker	2030
Deptford and Hendon	Marie Mccarthy	2028
Deptford and Hendon	Lynda Andrews	2027
Doxford Park	Heather Fagan	2030
Doxford Park	Paul Gibson	2028
Doxford Park	Michael Peacock	2027
Farringdon and Silksworth	Helen Greener	2030
Farringdon and Silksworth	Ian Dury	2028
Farringdon and Silksworth	Robert Hutchinson	2027
Fulwell	Malcolm Bond	2030
Fulwell	Peter Walton	2028
Fulwell	Steve Pickering	2027
Grangetown	Daniel Cowie	2030
Grangetown	Mark Wynn	2028
Grangetown	Colin Wright	2027
Grindon and Thorney Close	Paul Edgeworth	2030
Grindon and Thorney Close	Stephen O'Brien	2028
Grindon and Thorney Close	Meg Crosby	2027
Herrington and Newbottle	Bill Blackett	2030
Herrington and Newbottle	Bruce Allcroft	2028
Herrington and Newbottle	Jeffrey Shaw	2027
Hetton	Alan Davies	2030
Hetton	Jason Lloyd	2028
Hetton	Steven Paterson	2027
Houghton North	Sandra Hobson-Tate	2030
Houghton North	Joseph Parkin	2028
Houghton North	Donna Thomas	2027
Houghton South and Hetton Downs	Heather Finlay	2030
Houghton South and Hetton Downs	Jonathon Emerson	2028
Houghton South and Hetton Downs	Michael Quigley	2027
Hylton Castle	Ian Jones	2030
Hylton Castle	David Laing	2028
Hylton Castle	Glenn Gibbins	2027
Pallion and Ford	Martin Haswell	2030
Pallion and Ford	Steve Donkin	2028
Pallion and Ford	Julia Potts	2027
Pennywell and South Hylton	Carol Giles	2030
Pennywell and South Hylton	Russell Giles	2028
Pennywell and South Hylton	Julia Ann Irwing	2027
Penshaw and Shiney Row	Carole Allcroft	2030
Penshaw and Shiney Row	Abbey Purcell	2028
Penshaw and Shiney Row	Axel Tye	2027
Redhouse	Shaun Conley	2030
Redhouse	Chris Eynon	2028
Redhouse	Ciera Hudspith	2027
Roker	Kirsty Alder	2030
Roker	Andrew Ramsey	2028
Roker	Thomas Steele	2027
Ryhope	Sharon Surtees	2030
Ryhope	Pamela Taylor	2028
Ryhope	James Jackson	2027
Southwick	Michael Leadbitter	2030
Southwick	Jannine Morrow	2028
Southwick	Jamie Scott	2027
Tunstall and Humbledon	David Wales	2030
Tunstall and Humbledon	Richard Vardy	2028
Tunstall and Humbledon	Glenda Hall	2027
Washington Central	Joesph Phillips	2030
Washington Central	Janis Berzemnieks	2028
Washington Central	Saleem Memon	2027
Washington East	Ian Hembrough	2030
Washington East	Emily Lopez	2028
Washington East	Anthony Ormond	2027
Washington North	Jason King	2030
Washington North	Paul Donaghy	2028
Washington North	Elizabeth Brown	2027
Washington South	Robert Pattison	2030
Washington South	Elouise Redmayne	2028
Washington South	John Watson	2027
Washington West	Brandon Feeley	2030
Washington West	Joanne Chapman	2028
Washington West	Adrian Pickering	2027

The next election is due in 2027.

== Premises ==
The council is based at City Hall on Plater Way, which was purpose-built for the council and opened in 2021. The new City Hall is located on the former premises of Vaux Breweries. The building is part of the larger development project on the Vaux Site and the regeneration project of Riverside Sunderland. The building was designed by FaulknerBrowns and constructed by Bowmer and Kirkland. City Hall is also used for community events and meetings in addition to being the base of council operations. The building has an area of 17,480 m².

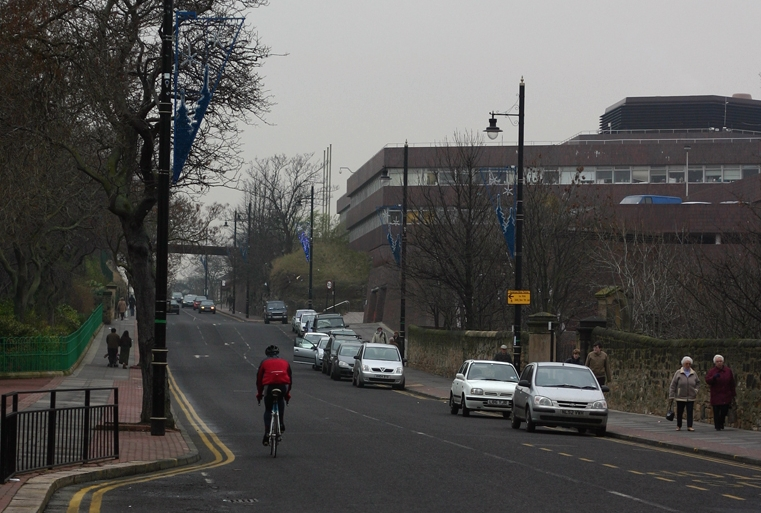
Civic Centre, Burdon Road: Council's headquarters 1970–2021

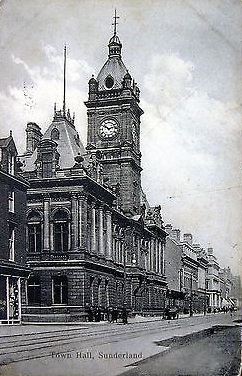
Town Hall, Fawcett Street: Old borough council's headquarters 1890–1970

Prior to the construction of the new City Hall, the council was based at the Civic Centre on Burdon Road, which had been built in 1970. The Civic Centre was demolished in 2022 and a new housing estate has been constructed in its place.

The Civic Centre in turn had replaced the old borough council's headquarters at the Town Hall on Fawcett Street which itself had been built in 1890 and was demolished shortly after the council moved to the Civic Centre.
