= Sunderland City Council elections =

Local authority elections in Sunderland, England

Sunderland City Council elections are generally held three years out of every four, with a third of the council being elected each time. Sunderland City Council is the local authority for the metropolitan borough of the City of Sunderland in Tyne and Wear, England. Since the last boundary changes in 2004, 75 councillors have been elected from 25 wards.

== Council composition ==
Whilst under Labour control solidly since 1973, the political composition of Sunderland City Council has fluctuated over the years as the Conservatives, SDP-Liberal Alliance, and Independents gained seats from the Labour Party. Until 2019, only Labour, Conservatives, Liberal Democrats and Independents (including Independent Labour) had ever won seats on Sunderland City Council. When UKIP and Green Party councillors were elected in 2019, Sunderland became one of the few British councils with all five parties represented. The table below gives an impression of the council's composition based on local election results.

Election	Conservative	Labour	Liberal Democrat	Independent	UKIP	Green	Reform UK	Total
1973	21	56	0	1	0	0	0	78
1975	23	52	1	2	0	0	0	78
1976	26	49	1	2	0	0	0	78
1978	27	49	1	1	0	0	0	78
1979	24	53	0	1	0	0	0	78
1980	18	58	1	1	0	0	0	78
1982	15	49	8	3	0	0	0	75
1983	14	52	7	2	0	0	0	75
1984	13	53	7	2	0	0	0	75
1986	11	59	5	0	0	0	0	75
1987	10	61	4	0	0	0	0	75
1988	9	63	3	0	0	0	0	75
1990	8	64	3	0	0	0	0	75
1991	8	64	3	0	0	0	0	75
1992	8	64	3	0	0	0	0	75
1994	8	64	3	0	0	0	0	75
1995	5	67	3	0	0	0	0	75
1996	4	68	3	0	0	0	0	75
1998	4	68	3	0	0	0	0	75
1999	8	64	3	0	0	0	0	75
2000	10	62	3	0	0	0	0	75
2002	11	62	2	0	0	0	0	75
2003	9	63	1	2	0	0	0	75
2004	12	61	2	0	0	0	0	75
2006	13	59	2	1	0	0	0	75
2007	17	53	1	4	0	0	0	75
2008	22	48	1	4	0	0	0	75
2010	18	52	1	4	0	0	0	75
2011	14	56	1	4	0	0	0	75
2012	8	64	0	3	0	0	0	75
2014	8	63	0	4	0	0	0	75
2015	6	66	0	3	0	0	0	75
2016	6	67	1	1	0	0	0	75
2018	8	61	6	0	0	0	0	75
2019	12	51	8	0	3	1	0	75
2021	18	42	12	0	3	0	0	75
2022	18	41	14	1	0	0	0	75
2023	13	45	15	0	0	0	1	75
2024	10	53	12	0	0	0	0	75
2025	9	51	12	2	0	0	1	75
2026								

== Council elections ==
Sunderland's Council area comprises 25 wards, each electing three councillors. Elections are held in thirds, in three years out of every four. Between 1974 and 1986, elections were held in every fourth year to Tyne and Wear County Council, until the County Council was abolished. In 1982 and 2004, all seats on Sunderland Council were up for election following boundary changes.

=== Elections under 1973-1980 boundaries ===
- Sunderland Metropolitan Borough Council election, 1973 (whole council elected)
- Sunderland Metropolitan Borough Council election, 1975
- Sunderland Metropolitan Borough Council election, 1976
- Sunderland Metropolitan Borough Council election, 1978
- Sunderland Metropolitan Borough Council election, 1979
- Sunderland Metropolitan Borough Council election, 1980

=== Elections under 1982-2003 boundaries ===
- Sunderland Metropolitan Borough Council election, 1982 (whole council elected after boundary changes)
- Sunderland Metropolitan Borough Council election, 1983
- Sunderland Metropolitan Borough Council election, 1984
- Sunderland Metropolitan Borough Council election, 1986
- Sunderland Metropolitan Borough Council election, 1987
- Sunderland Metropolitan Borough Council election, 1988
- Sunderland Metropolitan Borough Council election, 1990
- Sunderland Metropolitan Borough Council election, 1991
- 1992 Sunderland City Council election
- 1994 Sunderland City Council election
- 1995 Sunderland City Council election
- 1996 Sunderland City Council election
- 1998 Sunderland City Council election
- 1999 Sunderland City Council election
- 2000 Sunderland City Council election
- 2002 Sunderland City Council election
- 2003 Sunderland City Council election

=== Elections under 2004 boundaries ===
- 2004 Sunderland City Council election (whole council elected after boundary changes)
- 2006 Sunderland City Council election
- 2007 Sunderland City Council election
- 2008 Sunderland City Council election
- 2010 Sunderland City Council election
- 2011 Sunderland City Council election
- 2012 Sunderland City Council election
- 2014 Sunderland City Council election
- 2015 Sunderland City Council election
- 2016 Sunderland City Council election
- 2018 Sunderland City Council election
- 2019 Sunderland City Council election
- 2021 Sunderland City Council election
- 2022 Sunderland City Council election
- 2023 Sunderland City Council election
- 2024 Sunderland City Council election
- 2026 Sunderland City Council election

== Election results maps ==
2004 results map

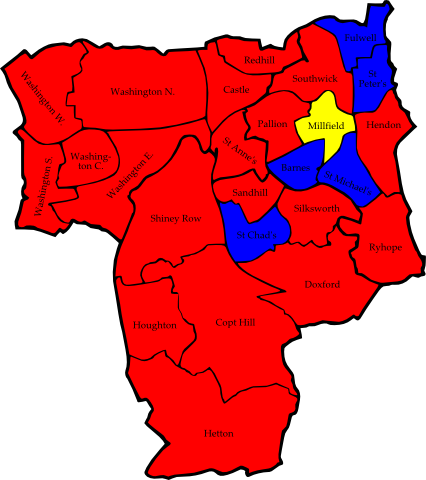
2006 results map

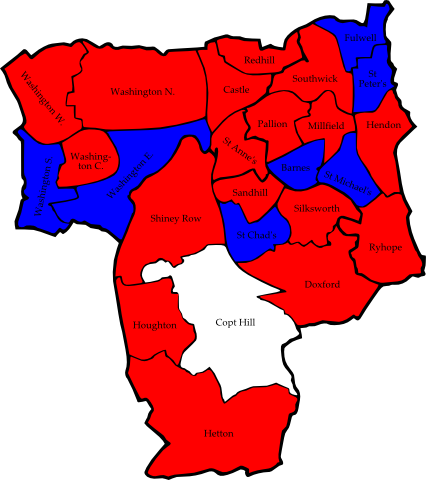
2007 results map

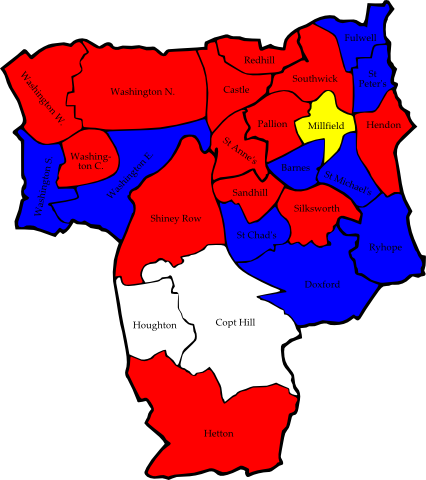
2008 results map

2010 results map

2011 results map

2012 results map

2014 results map

2015 results map

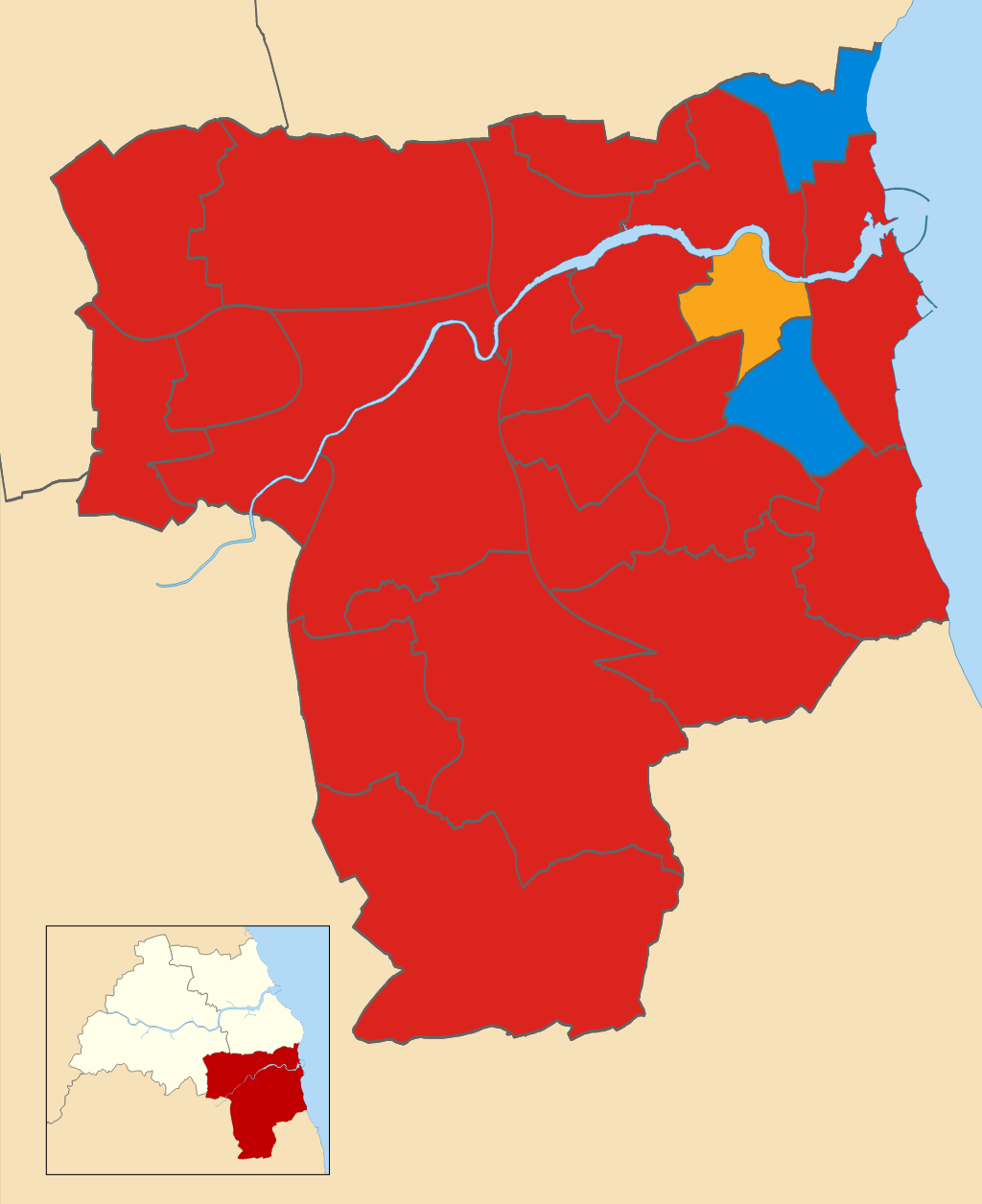
2016 results map

2018 results map

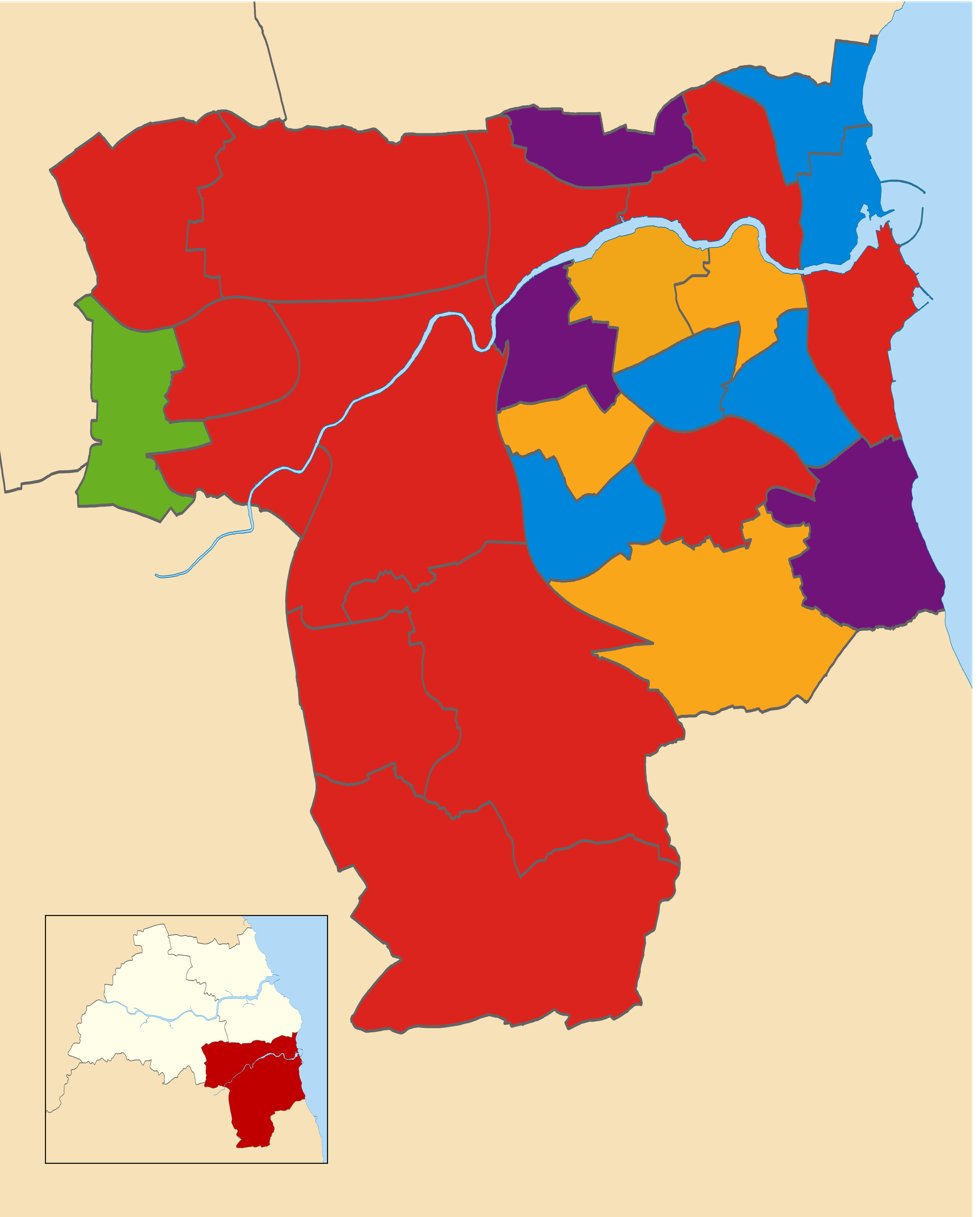
2019 results map

2021 results map

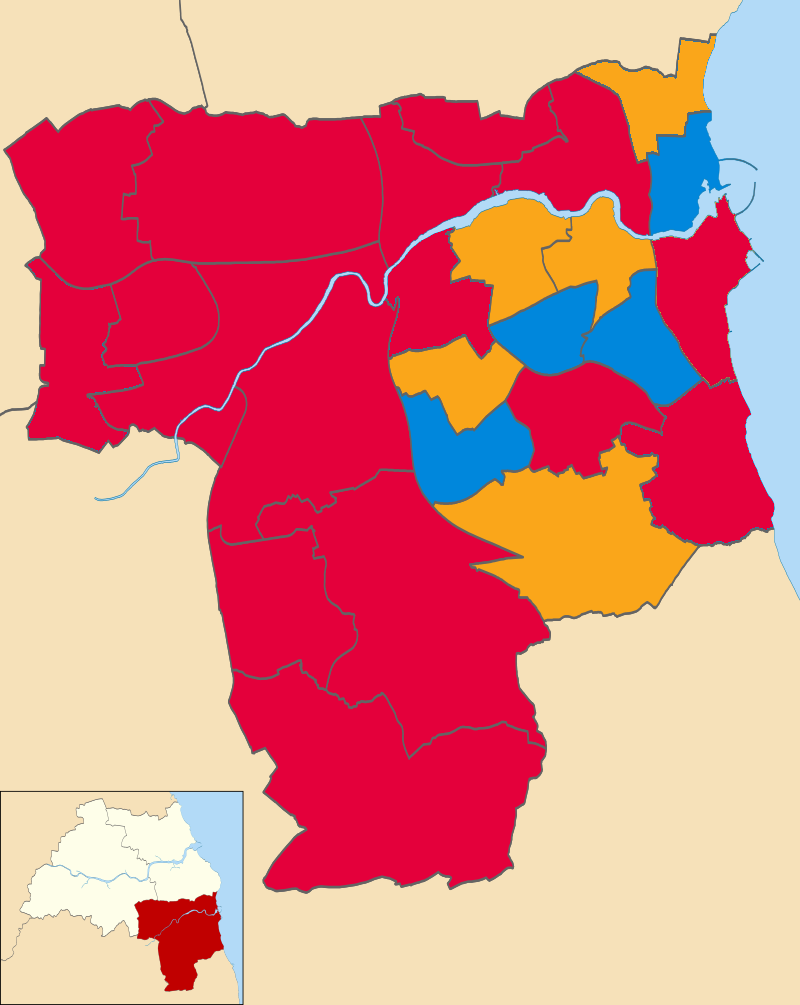
2022 results map

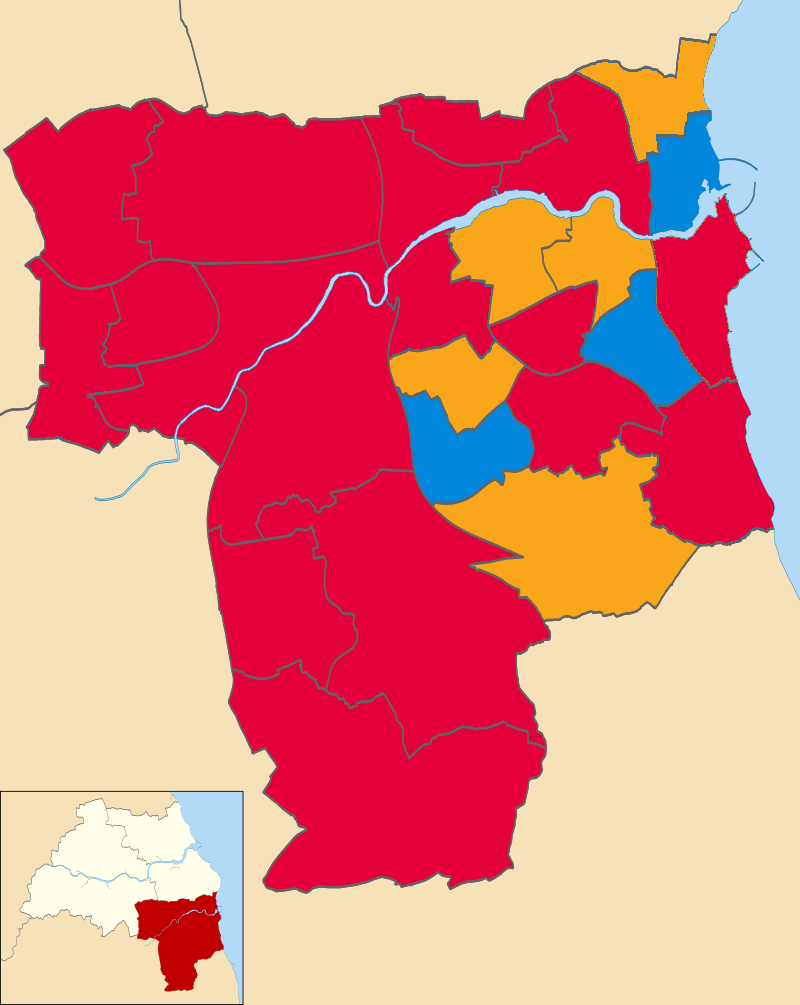
2023 results map

2024 results map

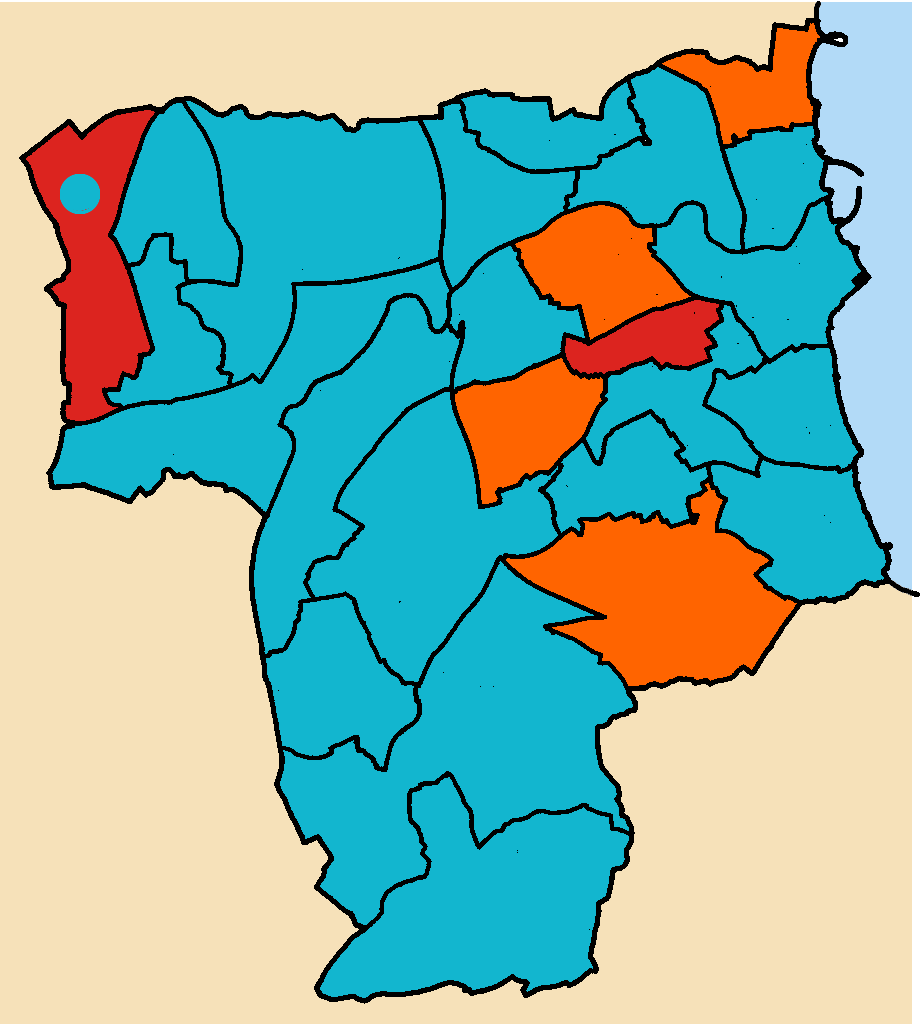
2026 results map

== By-election results ==
=== 1994-1998 ===
South Hylton By-Election 18 September 1997
Party	Candidate	Votes	%	±%
Labour		636	71.1	−10.3
Conservative		178	19.9	+1.3
Liberal Democrats		80	9.0	+9.0
Majority		458	51.2	
Turnout		894	11.4	
Labour hold		Swing		

=== 1998-2002 ===
Colliery By-Election 23 July 1998
Party	Candidate	Votes	%	±%
Labour		646	46.7	−18.7
Conservative		394	28.5	+9.9
Liberal Democrats		343	24.8	+8.9
Majority		252	18.2	
Turnout		1,383	18.0	
Labour hold		Swing		

Town End Farm By-Election 6 July 2000
Party	Candidate	Votes	%	±%
Labour		509	63.4	
Conservative		155	19.3	
Liberal Democrats		139	17.3	
Majority		354	44.1	
Turnout		803	11.8	
Labour hold		Swing		

Eppleton By-Election 7 June 2001
Party	Candidate	Votes	%	±%
Labour		3,074	65.9	+2.2
Conservative		860	18.4	−17.8
Liberal Democrats		731	15.7	+15.7
Majority		2,214	47.5	
Turnout		4,665		
Labour hold		Swing		

=== 2004-2006 ===
Barnes by-election, 24 November 2005
Party	Candidate	Votes	%	±%
Conservative	Anthony Morrissey	1,139	50.8	▲15.8
Liberal Democrats	Peter Taylor	547	24.4	▼4.7
Labour	Ian Galbraith	489	21.8	▼4.5
BNP	Ian Leadbitter	67	3.0	▼6.6
Majority		592	26.4	
Turnout		2,242	25.5	▼23
Conservative hold		Swing	▲10.3	

Millfield by-election, 23 March 2006
Party	Candidate	Votes	%	±%
Liberal Democrats	Paul Dixon	566	43.5	▲10.2
Labour	Shirley Waldron	397	30.5	▼1.1
Conservative	Leslie Dobson	260	20.0	▼1.6
BNP	James Davison	79	6.0	▼7.4
Majority		169	13.0	
Turnout		1,302	18.2	▼17.7
Liberal Democrats hold		Swing	▲5.7	

=== 2006-2010 ===
Washington East by-election, 27 September 2007
Party	Candidate	Votes	%	±%
Conservative	Angela Cuthbert	1,196	49.9	▲9.8
Labour	Dianne Snowdon	994	41.5	▲2.2
Liberal Democrats	David Snowball	206	8.6	▼5.6
Majority		202	8.4	
Turnout		2,396	27.6	▼8.3
Conservative gain from Labour		Swing	▲6	

=== 2010-2014 ===
Houghton by-election, 2 May 2013
Party	Candidate	Votes	%	±%
Labour	Gemma Taylor	1,418	47.1	▲1.3
Independent	John Ellis	1,124	37.3	▲37.3
UKIP	Edward Coleman-Hughes	302	10	
Conservative	George Brown	111	3.7	
Liberal Democrats	Sue Sterling	55	1.8	▼0.5
Majority		294	9.8	
Turnout		3,010	33.3	▼2.5
Labour hold		Swing	▼19.3	

=== 2014-2018 ===
St Anne's by-election, 27 March 2014
Party	Candidate	Votes	%	±%
Labour	Jacqui Gallagher	945	48.1	▼24
UKIP	Aileen Casey	555	28.2	▲28.2
Conservative	Tony Morrissey	345	17.6	▲3.6
Green	Emily Blyth	120	6.1	▼5
Majority		390	19.8	
Turnout		1,965	23.2	▼4.8
Labour hold		Swing	▼26.1	

Washington East by-election, 11 December 2014
Party	Candidate	Votes	%	±%
Labour	Tony Taylor	775	38.3	▼3
Conservative	Hilary Johnson	595	29.4	▲4.1
UKIP	Alistair Baxter	506	25	▼1.1
Green	Tony Murphy	93	4.6	
Liberal Democrats	Stephen O'Brien	52	2.6	▼2.2
Majority		180	8.9	
Turnout		2,021	23.4	▼10.9
Labour hold		Swing	▼3.6	

Sandhill by-election, 12 January 2017
Party	Candidate	Votes	%	±%
Liberal Democrats	Stephen O'Brien	824	45.0	▲41.5
Labour	Gary Waller	458	25.0	▼29.9
UKIP	Bryan Foster	343	18.7	▼7.2
Conservative	Gavin Wilson	184	10.0	▼5.7
Green	Helmut Izaks	23	1.3	
Majority		366	20.0	
Turnout		1,832	23.8	▼4.8
Liberal Democrats gain from Labour		Swing	▲35.7	

Pallion by-election, 1 February 2018
Party	Candidate	Votes	%	±%
Liberal Democrats	Martin Haswell	1,251	53.8	▲49.5
Labour	Gordon Chalk	807	31.7	▼25.9
Conservative	Grant Shearer	126	5.4	▼4.2
UKIP	Steven Bewick	97	4.2	▼24.7
Green	Craig Hardy	39	1.7	▼1.8
Majority		444	19.1	
Turnout		2,324	31.7	▲2.7
Liberal Democrats gain from Labour		Swing	▲37.7	

=== 2018-2022 ===
Hetton by-election, 30 September 2021
Party	Candidate	Votes	%	±%
Labour	Iain Scott	661	31.6	▼1.7
Liberal Democrats	John Lennox	634	30.3	▲30.3
Independent	David Geddis	386	18.5	▼3.1
Conservative	Adelle Burnicle	303	14.5	▲8.8
Independent	Maurice Allen	67	3.2	▲3.2
Green	Justine Merton-Scott	41	2	▼1.8
Majority		27	1.3	▼3.3
Turnout		2,092	22.5	▼10.3
Labour hold		Swing	▼16	

Redhill by-election, 3 March 2022
Party	Candidate	Votes	%	±%
Labour	John Usher	709	46.9	▲9.3
Liberal Democrats	Steven Donkin	386	25.5	▲25.5
Conservative	Sue Leishman	296	19.6	▲5.5
UKIP	Ian Lines	85	5.6	▼35.4
Green	Helmut Izaks	35	2.3	▼5.0
Majority		323	21.4	
Turnout		1,511		
Labour gain from UKIP		Swing		

At the time of resignation, incumbent Keith Jenkins was an independent.

=== 2022-2026 ===
Hetton by-election, 27 November 2025
Party	Candidate	Votes	%	±%
Reform	Ian McKinley	1,270	46.3	▲46.3
Independent	David Geddis	689	25.1	▼11.2
Labour	Lauren Laws	611	22.3	▼22.8
Liberal Democrats	Mia Coupland	113	4.1	▼2.1
Conservative	Adam Aiston	61	2.2	▼10.2
Majority		581	21.2	▲12.4
Turnout		2744	29.3	▼0.3
Reform gain from Labour		Swing		

The by-election was caused by the death of Councillor Claire Rowntree. Cllr Ian McKinley later resigned from Reform UK on 11 February 2026 to sit as an independent.
