= 2026 Sunderland City Council election =

Local election in Tyne and Wear, England

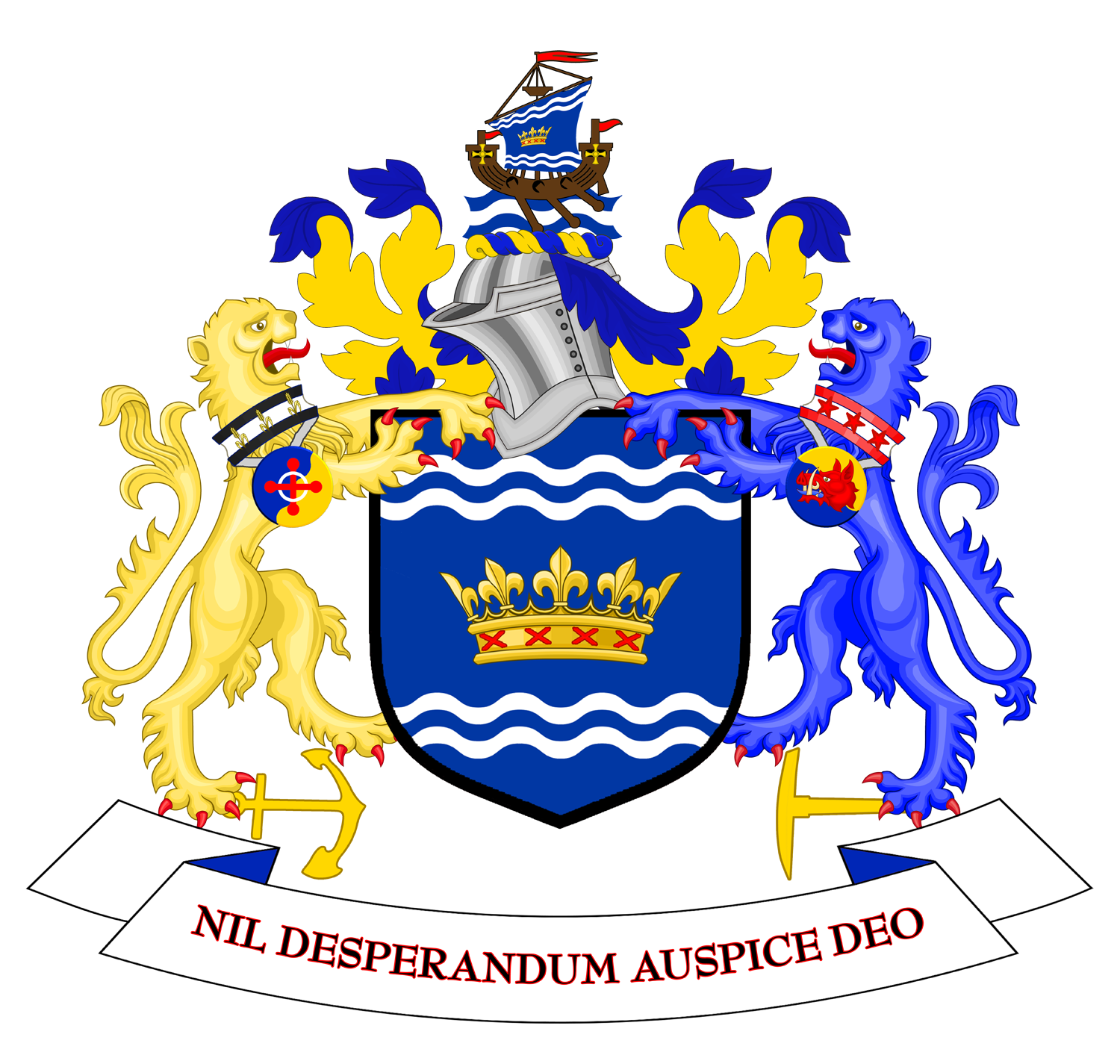
- 7 May 2026

All 75 seats to Sunderland City Council 38 seats needed for a majority
- Turnout: 40.5%

	First party	Second party	Third party
Leader	Chris Eynon (Note: Appointed leader after election, Reform having no councillors prior to it.)	Paul Edgeworth	Michael Mordey
Party	Reform	Liberal Democrats	Labour
Leader's seat	Redhouse	Grindon & Thorney Close	Grangetown (defeated)
Last election	0 seats, 14.5%	12 seats, 15.3%	53 seats, 45.4%
Seats before	0	12	49 (Note: Includes the vacant seat in Washington West last held by Labour.)
Seats won	58	12	5
Seat change	▲58	-	▼44
	Fourth party	Fifth party	Sixth party
Leader	Antony Mullen
Party	Conservative	Independent	Green
Leader's seat	Tunstall & Humbledon (defeated)
Last election	10 seats, 18.2%	0 seats, 1.5%	0 seats, 5.2%
Seats before	9	3	1
Seats won	0	0	0
Seat change	▼9	▼3	▼1
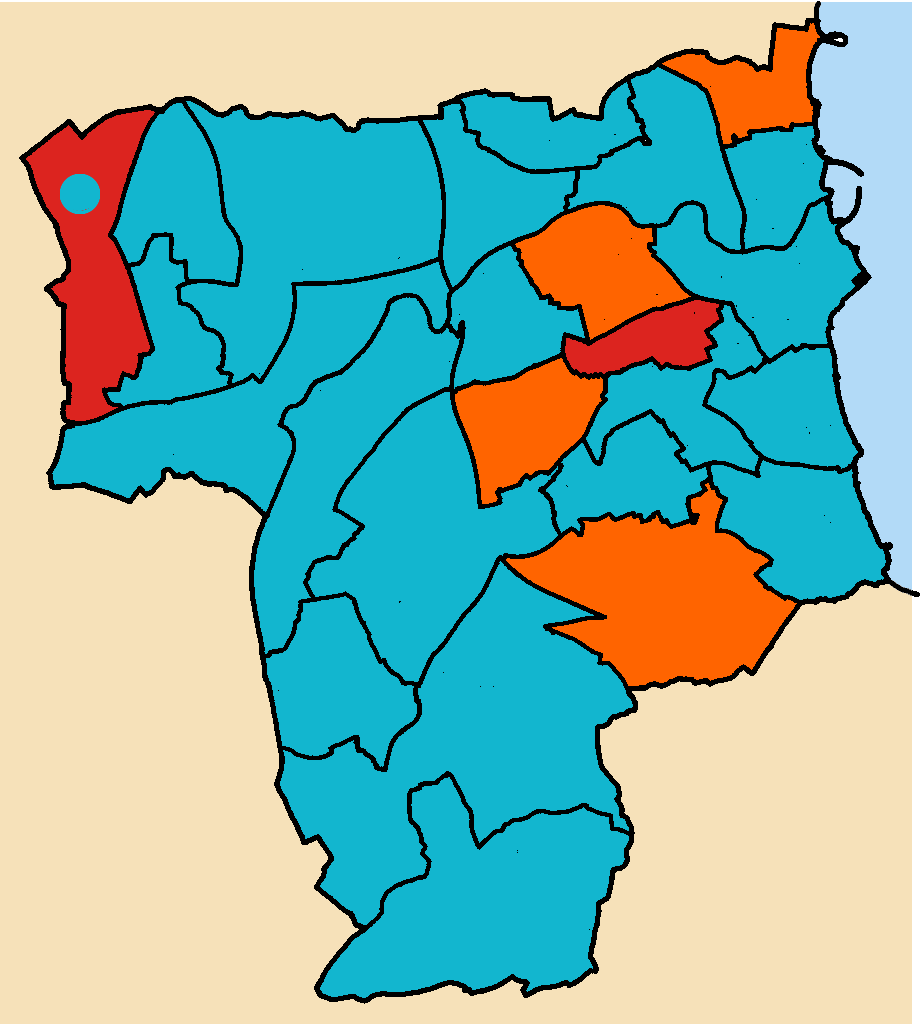
Leader before election
Michael Mordey
Labour Co-op
Leader after election
Chris Eynon
Reform

The 2026 Sunderland City Council election was held on 7 May 2026, alongside the other local elections across the United Kingdom which were held on the same day. All 75 members of Sunderland City Council were elected. Boundary changes were made for these elections.

Prior to the election, the council was under Labour majority control, as it had been for over 50 years. At the election, Reform UK, which held no seats prior to the election, won 58 of the 75 seats giving them overall control with a significant majority. Labour went from holding 49 seats prior to the election to having just five seats; the incumbent Labour leader of the council, Michael Mordey, lost his seat. The Conservatives lost all their seats. The Liberal Democrats won 12 seats, making them the largest opposition party. After the election, Reform chose Chris Eynon to be its new group leader. He was formally appointed as the new leader of the council at the subsequent annual council meeting on 20 May 2026.

== Background ==
Before the election Labour was the largest party with Liberal Democrats forming the official opposition after overtaking the Conservatives at the 2023 and 2024 elections. Since the last election two councillors defected from both Labour and the Conservatives to sit as Independents.

In November 2025 Reform UK won their first seat on the council with a 35% swing in the Hetton ward by-election, however their councillor resigned from the party after just 76 days and sat as an independent. There was speculation that Reform would take control of the council like it had the year before in County Durham.

In March 2026, Fiona Miller a Labour councillor first elected in 2011 defected to the Green Party. Her husband Graeme Miller was council leader for Labour between 2018 and 2024 before he was removed by Labour's National Executive Committee.

== Election results ==
Council composition after the 2024 election

Council composition after the 2026 election

2026 Sunderland City Council election
Party	Candidates	Seats	Gains	Losses	Net gain/loss	Seats %	Votes %	Votes	+/−
Reform	75	58			▲58	77.33	41.31	101,732	▲26.87
Liberal Democrats	75	12			Steady	16.00	12.98	31,969	▼2.32
Labour	75	5			▼48	6.67	26.28	64,718	▼19.21
Conservative	75	0			▼10	0.00	10.66	26,243	▼7.55
Green	64	0			Steady	0.00	8.59	21,150	▲3.42
Independent	3	0			Steady	0.00	0.19	464	▼1.31

== Ward results ==
An asterisk next to a candidate's name denotes an incumbent councillor. Each ward elected three candidates, the candidate with the highest number of votes received a four year term until 2030, the candidate with the second highest number of votes received a two year term until May 2028, and the candidate with the third highest number of votes received a one year term until May 2027.

=== Barnes and Thornhill ===
Barnes and Thornhill
Party	Candidate	Votes	%	±%
Labour Co-op	Ehthesham Haque*	1,502	37.0	
Labour Co-op	Caroline Comer	1,483	36.5	
Labour Co-op	Fiona Katharine Tobin*	1,401	34.5	
Reform	Victor John Skinner	1,128	27.8	
Reform	Robert Snowdon	1,114	27.4	
Reform	Lynn Wynn	1,064	26.2	
Conservative	Benjamin William Davies-Scott	751	18.5	
Conservative	Nathan Williamson	724	17.8	
Conservative	Kevin Leonard	703	17.3	
Liberal Democrats	Syed Mahfuz Ahmed	502	12.4	
Green	Jake Taylor	402	9.9	
Green	Alyson Kordbarlag	398	9.8	
Green	Mark Dominic Tyers	338	8.3	
Liberal Democrats	Tim Ellis-Dale	328	8.1	
Liberal Democrats	Kai Lamont Crawford	308	7.6	
Majority				
Turnout				
Labour win (new seat)				
Labour win (new seat)				
Labour win (new seat)				

=== Deptford and Hendon ===
Deptford and Hendon
Party	Candidate	Votes	%	±%
Reform	David Barker	1,070	34.4	
Reform	Marie Mccarthy	990	31.8	
Reform	Lynda Andrews	964	31.0	
Labour Co-op	Stephen Lewis Elms*	865	27.8	
Labour Co-op	Syeda Shilpe Chowdhury	823	26.5	
Labour Co-op	Myles Alfie Mordey	814	26.2	
Green	Liam Murphy	399	12.8	
Green	Helmut Izaks	395	12.7	
Green	Raymond John Moore	384	12.4	
Liberal Democrats	Colin Wilson	352	11.7	
Liberal Democrats	Ciaran Morrissey	304	10.1	
Liberal Democrats	Francesca Hodson	292	9.7	
Conservative	James Ebere	144	4.8	
Conservative	Steven Porter	111	3.7	
Conservative	Gideon Oseremen Eriaye	108	3.6	
Majority				
Turnout				
Reform win (new seat)				
Reform win (new seat)				
Reform win (new seat)				

=== Doxford Park ===
Doxford Park
Party	Candidate	Votes	%	±%
Liberal Democrats	Heather Fagan*	1,860	50.2	▲0.9
Liberal Democrats	Paul Gibson*	1,649	44.5	▼4.8
Liberal Democrats	Michael Peacock	1,574	42.5	▼6.8
Reform	Lynda Alexander	1,349	36.4	▲24.1
Reform	Alan Emery	1,262	34.1	▲21.8
Reform	Bryn Thomas	1,229	33.2	▲20.9
Labour	Jean Barley	405	10.9	▼17.5
Labour	Allen Curtis*	387	10.4	▼18.0
Labour	Duncan Wood	372	10.0	▼18.4
Green	Keith Brown	197	5.3	▲2.1
Green	Lily Daniels	197	5.3	▲2.1
Green	Haley	171	4.6	▲1.4
Conservative	Adam Aiston	171	4.6	▼2.2
Conservative	Helen Maddison	149	4.0	▼2.8
Conservative	Ehis Uwaifo	119	3.2	▼3.6
Majority				
Turnout				
Liberal Democrats hold		Swing		
Liberal Democrats hold		Swing		
Liberal Democrats hold		Swing		

=== Farringdon and Silksworth ===
Farringdon and Silksworth
Party	Candidate	Votes	%	±%
Reform	Helen Greener	1,684	40.2	
Reform	Ian Dury	1,683	40.2	
Reform	Robert Hutchinson	1,644	39.2	
Labour	Joanne Laverick*	1,187	28.3	
Labour	Phil Tye*	1,124	26.8	
Labour	Lauren Laws	1,023	24.4	
Green	Scott Burrows	350	8.4	
Green	Heidi Tolson	274	6.5	
Green	Billy Howells	264	6.3	
Conservative	Joesph Austin	229	5.5	
Conservative	Deborah Mullen	204	4.9	
Conservative	Kevin de Roche	203	4.8	
Liberal Democrats	Jess Jenkins	154	3.7	
Liberal Democrats	Martin Smith	131	3.1	
Liberal Democrats	Linda Mary Wood	124	3.0	
Majority				
Turnout				
Reform win (new seat)				
Reform win (new seat)				
Reform win (new seat)				

=== Fulwell ===
Fulwell
Party	Candidate	Votes	%	±%
Liberal Democrats	Malcolm Bond*	1,988	42.5	▲10.5
Liberal Democrats	Peter Walton*	1,738	37.1	▲5.1
Liberal Democrats	Steve Pickering	1,659	35.4	▲3.4
Reform	Phillip Thompson	1,424	30.4	▲22.5
Reform	David Owen	1,376	29.4	▲21.5
Reform	Janet Tyson	1,199	25.6	▲17.7
Conservative	Michael Hartnack*	1,186	25.3	▼10.5
Conservative	Nichola Austin-Ratcliffe	847	18.1	▼17.7
Conservative	Bill Smith	801	17.1	▼18.7
Labour	Naomi Mather	380	8.1	▼12.5
Labour	Peter Barley	376	8.0	▼12.6
Labour	Malcolm Kilner	368	7.9	▼12.7
Green	Brian Plemper	254	5.4	▲2.1
Green	Genevieve Johnson	232	5.0	▲1.7
Green	Sebastian Graca de Silva	214	4.6	▲1.3
Majority				
Turnout				
Liberal Democrats hold		Swing		
Liberal Democrats hold		Swing		
Liberal Democrats gain from Conservative		Swing		

=== Grangetown ===
Grangetown
Party	Candidate	Votes	%	±%
Reform	Daniel Cowie	1,476	39.1	
Reform	Mark Wynn	1,424	37.8	
Reform	Colin Wright	1,334	35.4	
Labour	Michael Mordey*	1,003	26.6	
Conservative	Michael Dixon*	965	25.6	
Labour	Lynda Scanlan*	936	24.8	
Labour	Ray Matthews	917	24.3	
Conservative	Alison Mason	765	20.3	
Conservative	Hardip Baras	735	19.5	
Green	Layla-Jayne Laidler	357	9.5	
Green	Serena Rush	322	8.5	
Green	Grace Weir	320	8.5	
Liberal Democrats	Marjorie Ledger	162	4.3	
Liberal Democrats	Vince Morrison	138	3.7	
Liberal Democrats	Audrey Smith	133	3.5	
Majority				
Turnout				
Reform win (new seat)				
Reform win (new seat)				
Reform win (new seat)				

=== Grindon and Thorney Close ===
Grindon and Thorney Close
Party	Candidate	Votes	%	±%
Liberal Democrats	Paul Edgeworth*	1,728	54.1	▼6.4
Liberal Democrats	Stephen O'Brien*	1,678	52.5	▼8.0
Liberal Democrats	Margaret Crosby*	1,673	52.4	▼8.1
Reform	Steven Mustard	1,128	35.3	▲25.4
Reform	Michael Gutowski	1,079	33.8	▲23.9
Reform	Mark Starling	1,076	33.7	▲23.8
Labour	Dennis Carroll	343	10.7	▼14.2
Labour	Ellie Young	332	10.4	▼14.5
Labour	Keith Lakeman	313	9.8	▼15.1
Conservative	Paula Reed	91	2.8	−
Conservative	Alex Sinclair	77	2.4	▼0.4
Conservative	John Wiper	63	2.0	▼0.8
Majority				
Turnout				
Liberal Democrats hold		Swing		
Liberal Democrats hold		Swing		
Liberal Democrats hold		Swing		

=== Herrington and Newbottle ===
Herrington and Newbottle
Party	Candidate	Votes	%	±%
Reform	Bill Blackett	1,548	37.4	
Reform	Bruce Allcroft	1,520	36.7	
Reform	Jeffrey Shaw	1,416	34.2	
Conservative	Dominic McDonough*	1,085	26.2	
Conservative	Robert Oliver	1,068	25.8	
Conservative	Chris Burnicle*	1,038	25.1	
Labour	Paul Jorgenson	888	21.5	
Labour	Maureen Richardson	875	21.1	
Labour	Martin Old	872	21.1	
Green	Donna Brown	300	7.2	
Green	Hayley Campbell	297	7.2	
Green	Joella Lynch	250	6.0	
Liberal Democrats	Michelle Hardie	181	4.4	
Liberal Democrats	Christopher Marshall	147	3.6	
Liberal Democrats	Malcolm Waine	122	2.9	
Majority				
Turnout				
Reform win (new seat)				
Reform win (new seat)				
Reform win (new seat)				

=== Hetton ===
Hetton
Party	Candidate	Votes	%	±%
Reform	Alan Davies	1,340	43.4	
Reform	Jason Lloyd	1,292	41.8	
Reform	Steven Paterson	1,241	40.2	
Labour	James Blackburn*	742	24.0	
Labour	George Callaghan	587	19.0	
Labour	Christopher Tobin	535	17.3	
Green	Rachel Lowe	277	9.0	
Green	Christopher Donaldson	260	8.4	
Green	Ynez Tulsen	185	6.0	
Liberal Democrats	Ian Ellis	153	5.0	
Conservative	Trevor Colgin	132	4.3	
Liberal Democrats	Kath Gaffney	121	3.9	
Conservative	Gwynneth Gibson	113	3.7	
Liberal Democrats	Elizabeth Gaffney	102	3.3	
Conservative	Henry Ndubuisi	89	2.9	
Majority				
Turnout				

=== Houghton North ===
Houghton North
Party	Candidate	Votes	%	±%
Reform	Sandra Louisa Hobson-Tate	1,584	51.1	
Reform	Joseph Francomb Parkin	1,542	49.7	
Reform	Donna Sarah Thomas	1,432	46.2	
Labour	John Price*	973	31.4	
Labour	Mark Burrell*	969	31.2	
Labour	Claire Danielle Bryant	963	31.0	
Green	Steph Langford	401	12.9	
Green	Pauline Robson	275	8.9	
Green	Kirsty Elizabeth Younger	248	8.0	
Conservative	Michaela Rhiannon Peacock	195	6.3	
Conservative	Mark John Reynoldson	171	5.5	
Conservative	Christel Rose	162	5.2	
Liberal Democrats	Felicity Louise Brand	152	4.9	
Liberal Democrats	Stewart Hardie	130	4.2	
Liberal Democrats	Steven Render	111	3.6	
Majority				
Turnout				

=== Houghton South and Hetton Downs ===
Houghton South and Hetton Downs
Party	Candidate	Votes	%	±%
Reform	Heather Finlay	1,477	39.1	
Reform	Jonathon Robert Emerson	1,339	35.4	
Reform	Michael Quigley	1,327	35.1	
Labour	Kevin Johnston*	999	26.4	
Labour	Tracy Dodds*	975	25.8	
Labour	Melanie Thornton*	904	23.9	
Green	Andrew Robertson	466	12.3	
Green	Harrison Hopps	334	8.8	
Conservative	Connor Sinclair	233	6.2	
Liberal Democrats	Emma Jane Baker	217	5.7	
Liberal Democrats	Mia Coupland	188	5.0	
Conservative	Harry Levi Jordan Brandon Shovlin	180	4.8	
Conservative	Mickey Mikhimade Olowoko	179	4.7	
Liberal Democrats	Jan Foster	175	4.6	
Majority				
Turnout				
Reform win (new seat)				
Reform win (new seat)				
Reform win (new seat)				

=== Hylton Castle ===
Hylton Castle
Party	Candidate	Votes	%	±%
Reform	Ian Jones	1,383	47.1	
Reform	David Laing	1,302	44.4	
Reform	Glen Gibbons	1,285	43.8	
Labour	Denny Wilson*	792	27.0	
Labour	Stephen Foster*	772	26.3	
Labour	Allison Chisnall*	767	26.1	
Liberal Democrats	Angela Smith	178	6.1	
Liberal Democrats	William Douglas	174	5.9	
Liberal Democrats	Miriam Townsend	150	5.1	
Conservative	Les Dunn	135	4.6	
Conservative	Denise Worthy	128	4.4	
Conservative	Dorothy Hartnack	127	4.3	
Majority				
Turnout				
Reform gain from Labour		Swing		
Reform gain from Labour		Swing		
Reform gain from Labour		Swing		

=== Pallion and Ford ===
Pallion and Ford
Party	Candidate	Votes	%	±%
Liberal Democrats	Martin Haswell*	1,700	47.7	▼0.5
Liberal Democrats	Steve Donkin*	1,595	44.7	▼3.5
Liberal Democrats	Julia Potts*	1,557	43.7	▼4.5
Reform	Raymond Lathan	1,120	31.4	▲20.7
Reform	Emma Margetson	1,051	29.5	▲18.8
Reform	David Parr	1,011	34.0	▲23.5
Labour	Kenny Amadasun	561	10.1	▼26.4
Labour	Angela Smith	481	13.5	▼23.0
Labour	Gorge Smith*	425	11.9	▼24.6
Green	Naomi Browne	313	8.8	▼7.2
Green	Rebecca Grant	275	7.7	▼6.1
Green	Jamie Lee	240	6.7	▼5.1
Independent	Karren Boble	194	5.4	−
Conservative	Phil Avery	99	2.8	▼0.3
Conservative	Bob Francis	73	2.0	▼1.1
Conservative	Joy Tennant	65	1.8	▼0.2
Majority				
Turnout				

=== Pennywell and South Hylton ===
Pennywell and South Hylton
Party	Candidate	Votes	%	±%
Reform	Carol Giles	1,570	46.0	
Reform	Russell Giles	1,551	45.4	
Reform	Julia Ann Irwing	1,439	42.1	
Labour Co-op	Lynne Dagg*	605	17.7	
Labour Co-op	Susan Watson*	539	15.8	
Labour Co-op	Catherine Hunter*	525	15.4	
Conservative	Greg Peacock	364	10.7	
Green	Laura Dunning	291	8.5	
Green	Simon Hughes	252	7.4	
Conservative	Shaun Cudworth	239	7.0	
Liberal Democrats	Godwin Ejeh	196	5.7	
Liberal Democrats	Sunshine Babalola	183	5.4	
Liberal Democrats	Anthony Usher	175	5.1	
Conservative	Jake Walker	172	5.0	
Majority				
Turnout				
Reform gain from Labour		Swing		
Reform gain from Labour		Swing		
Reform gain from Labour		Swing		

=== Penshaw and Shiney Row ===
Penshaw and Shiney Row
Party	Candidate	Votes	%	±%
Reform	Carole Allcroft	1,718	46.1	
Reform	Abbey Purcell	1,640	44.0	
Reform	Axel Tye	1,594	42.8	
Labour	Mel Speding*	1,065	28.6	
Labour	Katherine Mason-Gage*	1,005	27.0	
Labour	David Snowdon*	967	25.9	
Green	Sam Mcbride	371	10.0	
Green	Carl O'Halloran	323	8.7	
Conservative	Christopher Rose	287	7.7	
Conservative	David Oleka	272	7.3	
Conservative	Irene Onyia	254	6.8	
Liberal Democrats	Judy Durrant	221	5.9	
Liberal Democrats	Dorinda Strokes	172	4.6	
Liberal Democrats	Ringo Taylor	149	4.0	
Majority				
Turnout				

=== Redhouse ===
Redhouse
Party	Candidate	Votes	%	±%
Reform	Shaun Conley	1,329	47.4	
Reform	Chris Eynon	1,270	45.3	
Reform	Ciera Hudspith	1,260	44.9	
Labour Co-op	Paul Stewart*	684	24.4	
Labour Co-op	Alison Smith*	654	23.3	
Labour Co-op	John Usher*	545	19.4	
Green	Martha Bradley	232	8.3	
Green	John Scratcher	206	7.3	
Independent	Paul Humble	156	5.6	
Liberal Democrats	Steven Dale	136	4.8	
Liberal Democrats	Janice Ellis	122	4.4	
Liberal Democrats	Margaret Stephenson	118	4.2	
Conservative	Louise Avery	114	4.1	
Conservative	Bob Forster	90	3.2	
Conservative	Sue Leishman	87	3.1	
Majority				
Turnout				

=== Roker ===
Roker
Party	Candidate	Votes	%	±%
Reform	Kirsty Alder	1,818	45.0	
Reform	Andrew Ramsey	1,701	42.1	
Reform	Thomas Steele	1,544	38.2	
Labour	Bev Grainger	1,352	33.5	
Labour	Matthew Jackson	1,291	32.0	
Labour	Tom Newton	1,213	30.0	
Conservative	Sean Chapman	607	15.0	
Conservative	Emma Porter	454	11.2	
Green	Justine Merton-Scott	430	10.7	
Conservative	David Ogundipe	418	10.4	
Liberal Democrats	John Lennox	380	9.4	
Green	Helen Schell	348	8.6	
Liberal Democrats	Craig King	306	7.6	
Liberal Democrats	Miguel Smith	251	6.2	
Majority				
Turnout				
Reform gain from Labour		Swing		
Reform gain from Conservative		Swing		
Reform gain from Conservative		Swing		

=== Ryhope ===
Ryhope
Party	Candidate	Votes	%	±%
Reform	Sharon Surtees	1,665	46.3	▲20.3
Reform	Pamela Taylor	1,605	44.7	▲18.7
Reform	James Jackson	1,549	43.1	▲17.1
Labour Co-op	Helen Glancy*	1,044	29.1	▼24.6
Labour Co-op	Martyn Herron*	1,014	28.2	▼25.5
Labour Co-op	Lindsey Leonard*	969	27.0	▼26.7
Green	Nicola Jacques	284	7.9	▲7.9
Green	Barry Jacques	268	7.5	▲7.5
Green	Spencer Rose Cash-Archer	255	7.1	▲7.1
Liberal Democrats	Lewis Hunter	202	5.6	▼1.0
Conservative	James Doyle	196	5.5	▼8.2
Liberal Democrats	David Banks	179	5.0	▼1.6
Conservative	Pamela Jameson	178	5.0	▼8.7
Liberal Democrats	Sharon Boddy	162	4.5	▼2.1
Conservative	Pamela Taylor	177	4.9	▼8.8
Majority				
Turnout				
Reform gain from Labour		Swing		
Reform gain from Labour		Swing		
Reform gain from Labour		Swing		

=== Southwick ===
Southwick
Party	Candidate	Votes	%	±%
Reform	Michael Leadbitter	1,357	50.9	
Reform	Jannine Morrow	1,305	48.9	
Reform	Jamie Scott	1,217	45.6	
Labour	Michael Butler*	829	31.1	
Labour	Zoe Chandler	733	27.5	
Labour	Kelly Chequer*	729	27.3	
Green	Paul Jacques	270	10.1	
Green	John Appleton	260	9.8	
Liberal Democrats	Ben Hardie	227	8.5	
Liberal Democrats	Craig Doughty	220	8.3	
Green	Rafal Marzec	195	7.3	
Liberal Democrats	Andrew Wood*	167	6.3	
Conservative	Jon Reed	127	4.8	
Conservative	Sheila Smith	126	4.7	
Conservative	Kath Worthy	123	4.6	
Independent	Rosalind Copeland	114	4.3	
Majority				
Turnout				
Reform gain from Labour		Swing		
Reform gain from Labour		Swing		
Reform gain from Labour		Swing		

=== Tunstall and Humbledon ===
Tunstall and Humbledon
Party	Candidate	Votes	%	±%
Reform	David 'Taff' Wales	1,225	32.1	
Reform	Richard Vardy	1,194	31.3	
Reform	Glenda Hall	1,191	31.2	
Conservative	Adele Graham-King*	1,050	27.5	
Conservative	Lyall Jonathan Reed*	1,039	27.2	
Conservative	Antony Mullen*	1,037	27.2	
Labour	Lennon Airey	814	21.3	
Labour	Charlie Bell	789	20.7	
Green	Richard Bradley	723	19.0	
Green	Dan Sullivan	700	18.3	
Green	Dale Gillett	698	18.3	
Labour	Zareen Haque	672	17.6	
Liberal Democrats	Simon Dawes	149	3.9	
Liberal Democrats	Janet Wood	135	3.5	
Liberal Democrats	Robbie Potts	129	3.4	
Majority				
Turnout				

=== Washington Central ===
Washington Central
Party	Candidate	Votes	%	±%
Reform	Joseph Phillips	1,448	39.9	▲27.9
Reform	Janis Berzemnieks	1,213	33.4	▲21.4
Reform	Saleem Memon	1,112	30.7	▲18.7
Labour	Dianne Snowdon*	1,035	28.5	▼34.4
Labour	Linda Williams*	976	26.9	▼36.0
Labour	Harry Trueman*	860	23.7	▼39.2
Green	Michael Colling	360	9.9	▲4.9
Green	Ashley Smith	349	9.6	▲4.6
Liberal Democrats	Rebecca Armstrong	337	9.3	▲5.9
Liberal Democrats	Joshua Hall	294	8.1	▲4.7
Conservative	Valerie Moore	245	6.7	▼10.0
Green	Mishka Belik	222	6.1	▲1.1
Conservative	Audrey Jaitay	190	5.2	▼11.5
Conservative	Mary Ogundipe	169	4.7	▼12.0
Liberal Democrats	Kelsey Hall	159	4.4	▲1.0
Majority				
Turnout				
Reform gain from Labour		Swing		
Reform gain from Labour		Swing		
Reform gain from Labour		Swing		

=== Washington East ===
Washington East
Party	Candidate	Votes	%	±%
Reform	Ian Hembrough	1,275	43.0	
Reform	Emily Lopez	1,123	37.9	
Reform	Anthony Ormond	1,113	37.6	
Labour Co-op	Beth Jones*	1,065	35.9	
Labour Co-op	Graeme Miller*	910	30.7	
Labour Co-op	Jennifer Orji	789	26.6	
Green	Gary Bridge	429	14.5	
Green	Anna Snell	243	8.2	
Green	Michal Chantkowski	240	8.1	
Liberal Democrats	Lauren Laws	240	8.1	
Conservative	Ian Francombe	209	7.1	
Conservative	Finlee Gibbons	195	6.6	
Conservative	Victor Oluwagbemi	160	5.4	
Liberal Democrats	Helen Attey	140	4.7	
Liberal Democrats	Nana Boddy	126	4.3	
Majority				
Turnout		2,963	35.5	
Reform gain from Labour		Swing		
Reform gain from Labour		Swing		
Reform gain from Labour		Swing		

=== Washington North ===
Washington North
Party	Candidate	Votes	%	±%
Reform	Jason King	1,313	37.5	▲15.6
Reform	Paul Donaghy	1,311	37.4	▲24.7
Reform	Elizabeth Brown	1,235	35.3	▲13.4
Labour	Michael Walker*	935	26.7	▼37.5
Labour	Jill Fletcher*	917	26.2	▼38.0
Labour	Callum McPake	840	24.0	▼40.2
Green	Janette Nightingale	366	10.4	▲10.4
Green	Ross Dargan	328	9.4	▲9.4
Green	Steven Tolson	236	6.7	▲6.7
Conservative	Ayobami Adeoye	209	6.0	▼2.2
Conservative	Patricia Francis	192	5.5	▼2.7
Conservative	Richard Green	177	5.1	▼3.1
Liberal Democrats	Karen Laws	102	2.9	▼2.7
Liberal Democrats	Carlton West	97	2.8	▼2.8
Liberal Democrats	Kieran Wood	87	2.5	▼3.1
Majority				
Turnout				
Reform gain from Labour		Swing		
Reform gain from Labour		Swing		
Reform gain from Labour		Swing		

=== Washington South ===
Washington South
Party	Candidate	Votes	%	±%
Reform	Robert Pattison	1,616	39.5	▲26.8
Reform	Elouise Redmayne	1,591	38.9	▲26.2
Reform	John Watson	1,518	37.1	▲24.4
Labour	Sean Laws*	1,259	30.8	▼20.9
Labour	Logan Guy*	1,154	28.2	▼23.5
Labour	Andrew Rowntree	881	21.5	▼30.2
Conservative	Brandon Oakland	705	17.2	▼12.4
Green	Fiona Miller*	684	16.7	▲13.5
Conservative	Gabriel Green	676	16.5	▼13.1
Conservative	Thomas Such	664	16.2	▼13.4
Green	Theo Rose	525	12.8	▲9.6
Green	Peter Deegan	455	11.1	▲7.9
Liberal Democrats	Sean Terry	200	4.9	▲2.2
Liberal Democrats	Jack Docherty	152	3.7	▲1.0
Liberal Democrats	Amy Wilson	138	3.4	▲0.7
Majority				
Turnout				
Reform gain from Labour		Swing		
Reform gain from Labour		Swing		
Reform gain from Labour		Swing		

=== Washington West ===
Washington West
Party	Candidate	Votes	%	±%
Labour	Brandon Feeley*	1,662	38.8	▼12.8
Labour	Joanne Chapman*	1,560	36.4	▼15.2
Reform	Adrian Pickering	1,508	35.2	▲17.2
Labour	Patricia Raynor	1,400	32.7	▼18.9
Reform	Lee Redmayne	1,357	31.7	▲13.7
Reform	Neil Moffitt	1,350	31.5	▲13.5
Green	Josh Thurlow	382	8.9	▲0.7
Green	Chloe Harvey	370	8.6	▲0.4
Green	Paul Leonard	349	8.1	▼0.1
Conservative	Sam Cosgrove	269	6.3	▼8.1
Conservative	Neil King	201	4.7	▼9.7
Conservative	Samson Ibijola	153	3.6	▼10.8
Liberal Democrats	Viv Lee	114	2.7	▼5.1
Liberal Democrats	Ernie Peel	97	2.3	▼5.5
Liberal Democrats	Kairo Pearson	89	2.1	▼5.7
Majority				
Turnout				
Labour hold		Swing		
Labour hold		Swing		
Reform gain from Labour		Swing		
