= 2022 Sunderland City Council election =

2022 UK local government election

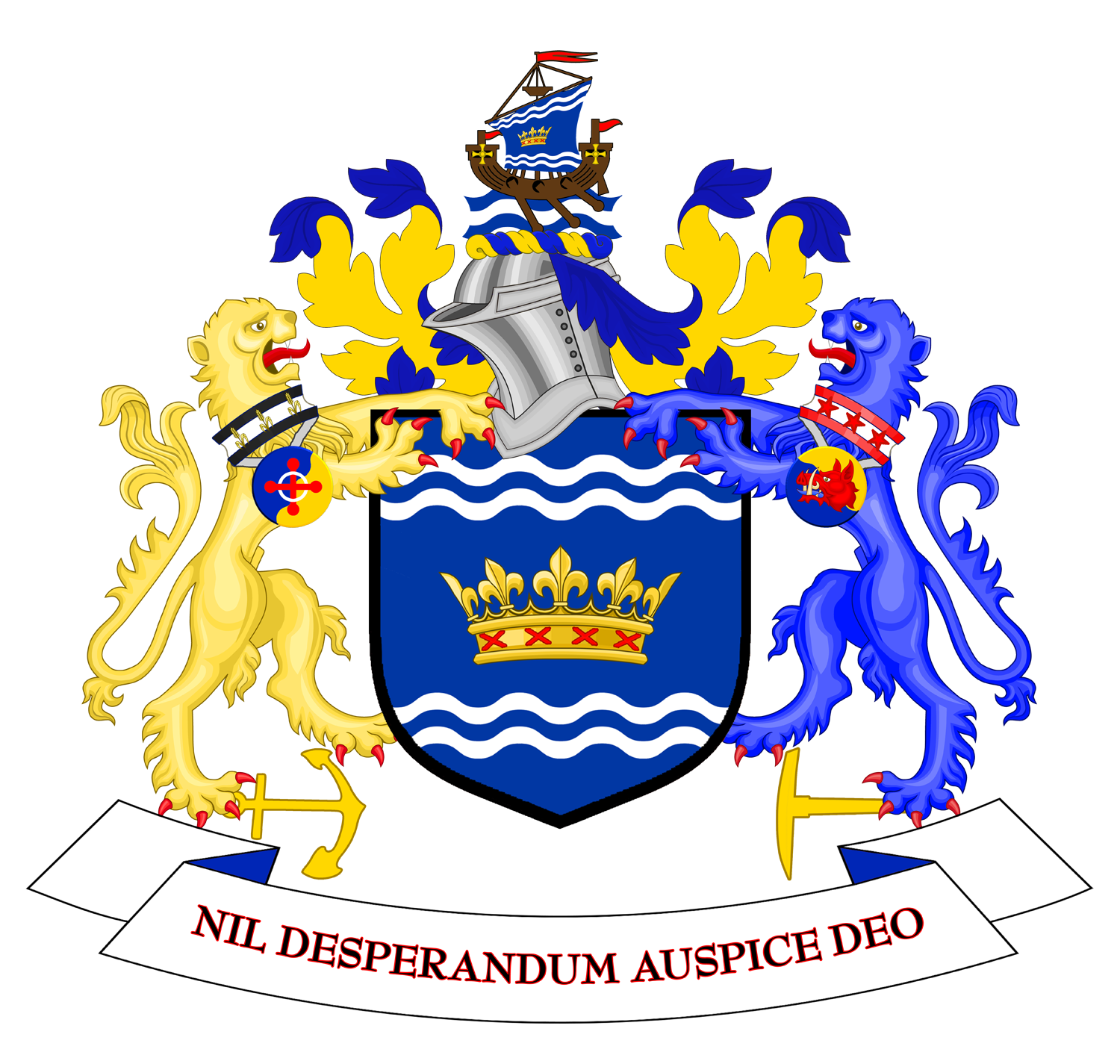
- 5 May 2022

One third of 75 seats on Sunderland City Council, except Copt Hill 38 seats needed for a majority
| | First party | Second party | Third party |
|---|---|---|---|
| Leader | Graeme Miller | Niall Hodson | Antony Mullen |
| Party | Labour | Liberal Democrats | Conservative |
| Leader's seat | Washington South | Millfield | Barnes |
| Seats before | 43 | 12 | 19 |
| Seats won | 16 | 5 | 4 |
| Seats after | 42 | 14 | 18 |
| Seat change | ▼1 | ▲2 | ▼1 |
| Popular vote | 30,687 | 10,355 | 20,986 |
| Swing | ▲5.4% | ▲0.1% | ▼3.9% |
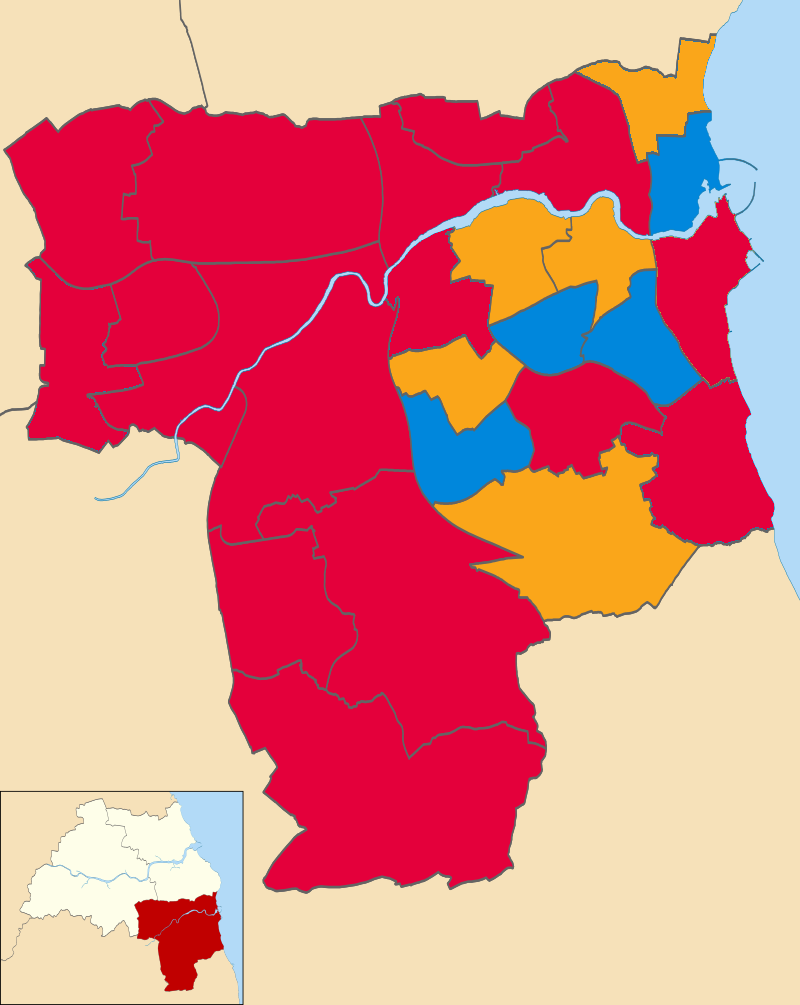
- Map showing the results of the 2022 Sunderland City Council election, including Copt Hill
Majority party before election
Labour
Majority party after election
Labour

The 2022 Sunderland City Council election took place on 5 May 2022 to elect members of Sunderland City Council. This is on the same day as other elections across the United Kingdom.

== Background ==
24 of the 75 seats will be up for election All 25 wards were originally due to elect councillors, however the election in Copt Hill ward was postponed following the death of the city's only UKIP candidate.

Since the first election in 1973, Sunderland has been a strongly Labour council, which consistently achieves over 60% control of the council. 2021 represented the worst year for Labour in terms of seats; the party lost 9 with 39.2% of the vote. The Conservatives gained 6 with 34.8%, the Liberal Democrats gained 4 with 15.4%, UKIP did not make any further gains with 4.5%, and the Green Party lost representation on the council with 5.2%.

There had been speculation ahead of the election that the Labour Party could lose overall control of Sunderland City Council for the first time in its history.

The seats up for election this year were last elected in 2018. In that election, Labour won 61 seats (a net loss of 4 seats). The Conservatives gained 2 seats while the Liberal Democrats gained 3 seats on the Council. 1 independent councillor lost their seat.

== Election results ==
After the election, the Labour Party maintained control of the Council. Labour's majority was reduced to 4, having lost 1 seat to the Liberal Democrats in Doxford Ward. In Fulwell, the Conservatives also lost a seat to the Liberal Democrats with a swing of 15%

The results defied media speculation that Labour would continue to haemorrhage seats like in 2021 and 2019. Labour leader Graeme Miller commented that "It was a good night" for his party because they "stopped the rot". Conservative Group leader Anthony Mullen, blamed his party's poor performance on the Partygate Scandal, after the Conservatives failed to gain seats in Washington South, Ryhope, St Anne's or Silksworth. Liberal Democrat leader Niall Hodson said his party's gains from both Labour and the Conservatives were a result of “good candidates working hard for a long period of time”.

2022 Sunderland City Council election
| Party | This election | | | | Full council | | | This election | | |
| Party | Candidates | Seats | Net | Seats % | Other | Total | Total % | Votes | Votes % | +/− |
|---|---|---|---|---|---|---|---|---|---|---|
| Labour | {{{candidates}}} | 16 | ▼1 | 62.5 | 26 | 42 | 54.7 | 29,718 | 44.6 | +5.4 |
| Conservative | {{{candidates}}} | 4 | ▼1 | 16.7 | 14 | 18 | 24.0 | 20,602 | 30.9 | -3.9 |
| Liberal Democrats | {{{candidates}}} | 5 | ▲2 | 20.8 | 9 | 14 | 18.7 | 10,294 | 15.5 | +0.1 |
| Independent | {{{candidates}}} | 0 | Steady | 0.0 | 1 | 1 | 1.3 | 1,437 | 2.2 | +1.4 |
| Green | {{{candidates}}} | 0 | Steady | 0.0 | 0 | 0 | 0.0 | 4,410 | 6.6 | +1.4 |
| Freedom Alliance | {{{candidates}}} | 0 | Steady | 0.0 | 0 | 0 | 0.0 | 120 | 0.2 | +0.2 |
| Communist | {{{candidates}}} | 0 | Steady | 0.0 | 0 | 0 | 0.0 | 30 | <0.1 | -0.1 |
| UKIP | {{{candidates}}} | 0 | Steady | 0.0 | 0 | 0 | 0.0 | 0 | 0.0 | -4.5 |

== Council composition ==
In the last council, the composition of the council was:

↓
| 43 | 19 | 12 | 1 |
| Labour | Conservative | Lib; Dem | INDY |

After the election, the composition of the council was:

↓
| 42 | 18 | 14 | 1 |
| Labour | Conservative | Lib; Dem | INDY |

== Ward results ==
An asterisk indicates an incumbent councillor.

=== Barnes ===
Barnes
| Party | Candidate | Votes | % | ±% |
|---|---|---|---|---|
| Conservative | Antony Mullen* | 1,637 | 47.6 | ▼0.7 |
| Labour | Abul Haque | 1,329 | 38.6 | ▼2.4 |
| Liberal Democrats | Tim Ellis | 264 | 7.7 | ▲1.7 |
| Green | Rachel Featherstone | 212 | 6.2 | ▲1.5 |
| Majority | | 308 | 9.0 | ▲1.7 |
| Turnout | | 3,453 | 41.9 | ▲1.6 |
| Conservative hold | | Swing | ▲0.9 | |

=== Castle ===
Castle
| Party | Candidate | Votes | % | ±% |
|---|---|---|---|---|
| Labour | Allison Chisnall | 1,308 | 64.2 | ▲6.1 |
| Conservative | Paul Burke | 505 | 24.8 | ▼2.5 |
| Green | Alison Ogle | 223 | 11.0 | New |
| Majority | | 803 | 39.4 | ▲9.3 |
| Turnout | | 2,050 | 25.2 | ▼1.1 |
| Labour hold | | Swing | ▲4.3 | |

=== Copt Hill (countermanded) ===
Copt Hill
| Party | Candidate | Votes | % | ±% |
|---|---|---|---|---|
| Labour | Tracy Dodds* | 969 | 44.3 | ▼4.3 |
| Independent | Kathleen Pearson | 606 | 27.7 | New |
| Conservative | Patricia Ann Francis | 384 | 17.6 | ▲2.8 |
| Green | Andrew Robertson | 158 | 7.2 | ▲3.5 |
| Liberal Democrats | Mary Ann Boddy | 61 | 2.8 | New |
| Majority | | 363 | 16.6 | ▲0.6 |
| Turnout | | 2,188 | 24.3 | ▼8.1 |
| Labour hold | | Swing | ▼16% | |

Note: This ward election took place on Thursday 16 June 2022. Copt Hill ward election was rescheduled due to the death of UKIP candidate Reg Coulson.

=== Doxford ===
Doxford
| Party | Candidate | Votes | % | ±% |
|---|---|---|---|---|
| Liberal Democrats | Allen Curtis | 1,511 | 49.7 | ▲1.0 |
| Labour | Steven Hansom | 851 | 28.0 | ▲2.3 |
| Conservative | Tom Cuthbertson | 565 | 18.6 | ▼3.5 |
| Green | Richard Bradley | 115 | 3.8 | ▲0.3 |
| Majority | | 660 | 21.7 | ▼1.3 |
| Turnout | | 3,048 | 38.4 | ▼1.1 |
| Liberal Democrats gain from Labour | | Swing | ▼0.7 | |

=== Fulwell ===
Fulwell
| Party | Candidate | Votes | % | ±% |
|---|---|---|---|---|
| Liberal Democrats | Malcolm Bond | 2,193 | 52.4 | ▲15.9 |
| Conservative | Sandra Boyers | 1,254 | 29.9 | ▼12.5 |
| Labour | Iain Kay | 648 | 15.5 | ▼1.4 |
| Green | Liam Dufferwiel | 93 | 2.2 | ▼2.0 |
| Majority | | 939 | 22.5 | ▲16.6 |
| Turnout | | 4,188 | 47.3 | ▼1.7 |
| Liberal Democrats gain from Conservative | | Swing | ▲14.2 | |

=== Hendon ===
Hendon
| Party | Candidate | Votes | % | ±% |
|---|---|---|---|---|
| Labour | Michael Mordey | 1,087 | 45.7 | ▲10.9 |
| Liberal Democrats | Tom Livingstone | 909 | 38.2 | ▼4.0 |
| Conservative | Syed Ali | 281 | 11.8 | ▼3.7 |
| Green | Helmut Izaks | 104 | 4.4 | ▼0.1 |
| Majority | | 178 | 7.5 | ▲0.1 |
| Turnout | | 2,390 | 29.3 | ▼1.4 |
| Labour hold | | Swing | ▲7.5 | |

=== Hetton ===
Hetton
| Party | Candidate | Votes | % | ±% |
|---|---|---|---|---|
| Labour | Claire Rowntree* | 1,320 | 45.1 | ▲0.4 |
| Independent | David Geddis | 991 | 36.3 | ▲16.6 |
| Conservative | Adelle Burnicle | 339 | 12.4 | ▼7.0 |
| Liberal Democrats | John Lennox | 168 | 6.2 | ▲4.0 |
| Majority | | 239 | 8.8 | ▼16.2 |
| Turnout | | 2,735 | 29.6 | ▼1.3 |
| Labour hold | | Swing | ▼8.5 | |

=== Houghton ===
Houghton
| Party | Candidate | Votes | % | ±% |
|---|---|---|---|---|
| Labour | Mark Burrell | 1,655 | 55.7 | ▲8.7 |
| Conservative | Craig Morrison | 681 | 22.9 | ▼8.8 |
| Independent | Donna Thomas | 446 | 15.7 | new |
| Green | Emma Robson | 169 | 5.7 | ▼0.8 |
| Majority | | 974 | 32.8 | ▲16.5 |
| Turnout | | 2,964 | 29.3 | ▼0.8 |
| Labour hold | | Swing | ▲8.3 | |

=== Millfield ===
Millfield
| Party | Candidate | Votes | % | ±% |
|---|---|---|---|---|
| Liberal Democrats | Andrew Wood* | 1,227 | 49.0 | ▼16.8 |
| Labour | Kingsley Okojie | 923 | 36.9 | ▲13.3 |
| Conservative | Gwennyth Gibson | 250 | 10.0 | ▲2.6 |
| Green | Gary Ogle | 64 | 2.6 | ▲0.7 |
| Communist | Julio Johnson | 30 | 1.2 | 0 |
| Majority | | 304 | 12.9 | ▼29.3 |
| Turnout | | 2,503 | 33.3 | ▼1.9 |
| Liberal Democrats hold | | Swing | ▼15.1 | |

=== Pallion ===
Pallion
| Party | Candidate | Votes | % | ±% |
|---|---|---|---|---|
| Liberal Democrats | George Smith* | 1,470 | 57.9 | ▼1.5 |
| Labour | Karen Noble | 723 | 28.5 | ▲8.7 |
| Conservative | Judith Porter | 266 | 10.5 | ▼6.4 |
| Green | Dorothy Lynch | 79 | 3.1 | ▼0.7 |
| Majority | | 747 | 29.4 | ▼10.2 |
| Turnout | | 2,543 | 32.8 | ▲0.1 |
| Liberal Democrats hold | | Swing | ▼5.1 | |

=== Redhill ===
Redhill
| Party | Candidate | Votes | % | ±% |
|---|---|---|---|---|
| Labour | Paul Stewart* | 1,065 | 56.3 | ▲5.7 |
| Liberal Democrats | Steven Donkin | 411 | 21.7 | new |
| Conservative | Sue Leishman | 326 | 17.2 | ▼13.5 |
| Green | Billy Howells | 89 | 4.7 | new |
| Majority | | 654 | 34.6 | ▲14.9 |
| Turnout | | 1,901 | 24.1 | ▼0.1 |
| Labour hold | | Swing | ▼8.0 | |

=== Ryhope ===
Ryhope
| Party | Candidate | Votes | % | ±% |
|---|---|---|---|---|
| Labour | Martyn Herron | 1,311 | 45.7 | ▲2.9 |
| Conservative | Kevin Leonard | 1,283 | 44.7 | ▼4.4 |
| Green | Robert Welsh | 277 | 9.6 | new |
| Majority | | 28 | 1.0 | ▲5.3 |
| Turnout | | 2,811 | 33.4 | ▲2.4 |
| Labour hold | | Swing | ▲3.7 | |

=== Sandhill ===
Sandhill
| Party | Candidate | Votes | % | ±% |
|---|---|---|---|---|
| Liberal Democrats | Margaret Crosby* | 1,274 | 53.2 | ▲2.4 |
| Labour | Debra Waller | 800 | 33.4 | ▲1.0 |
| Conservative | Christine Reed | 249 | 10.4 | ▼2.3 |
| Green | Laura Hind | 71 | 3.0 | new |
| Majority | | 474 | 19.8 | ▲3.4 |
| Turnout | | 2,404 | 31.2 | ▲2.2 |
| Liberal Democrats hold | | Swing | ▲1.7 | |

=== Shiney Row ===
Shiney Row
| Party | Candidate | Votes | % | ±% |
|---|---|---|---|---|
| Labour | Mel Speding* | 1,658 | 55.2 | ▲5.5 |
| Conservative | Richard Vardy | 882 | 20.4 | ▼12.0 |
| Green | Thomas Mower | 345 | 11.5 | ▲2.2 |
| Freedom Alliance | Michael Kennedy | 120 | 4.0 | new |
| Majority | | 776 | 25.8 | ▲8.5 |
| Turnout | | 3,016 | 31.6 | ▼0.6 |
| Labour hold | | Swing | ▲4.1 | |

=== Silksworth ===
Silksworth
| Party | Candidate | Votes | % | ±% |
|---|---|---|---|---|
| Labour | Phil Tye* | 1,618 | 56.2 | ▲13.6 |
| Conservative | Jack Simm | 923 | 32.1 | ▼8.7 |
| Green | Christopher Crozier | 337 | 11.7 | ▲4.9 |
| Majority | | 695 | 24.1 | ▲22.3 |
| Turnout | | 2,885 | 36.5 | ▲3.0 |
| Labour hold | | Swing | ▲11.2 | |

=== Southwick ===
Southwick
| Party | Candidate | Votes | % | ±% |
|---|---|---|---|---|
| Labour | Alex Samuels* | 1,309 | 58.6 | ▲7.8 |
| Conservative | John Wiper | 623 | 27.9 | ▼3.8 |
| Green | Morgan Seed | 280 | 12.5 | ▲8.1 |
| Majority | | 686 | 30.7 | ▲11.6 |
| Turnout | | 2,232 | 28.3 | ▼1.4 |
| Labour hold | | Swing | ▲5.7 | |

=== St. Anne's ===
St. Anne's
| Party | Candidate | Votes | % | ±% |
|---|---|---|---|---|
| Labour | Susan Watson | 1,061 | 48.8 | ▲6.9 |
| Conservative | Bryan Foster | 840 | 38.6 | ▼3.3 |
| Green | Raymond Moore | 273 | 12.6 | new |
| Majority | | 221 | 10.2 | ▲10.1 |
| Turnout | | 2,183 | 28.0 | ▲1.8 |
| Labour hold | | Swing | ▲5.1 | |

=== St. Chad's ===
St. Chad's
| Party | Candidate | Votes | % | ±% |
|---|---|---|---|---|
| Conservative | Simon Ayre | 1,453 | 49.5 | ▼10.4 |
| Labour | Martin Old | 974 | 33.7 | ▲1.2 |
| Liberal Democrats | Anthony Usher | 145 | 8.8 | ▲1.2 |
| Green | Alyson Kordbarlag | 114 | 7.9 | new |
| Majority | | 479 | 15.8 | ▼11.6 |
| Turnout | | 2,697 | 36.8 | ▼0.8 |
| Conservative hold | | Swing | ▼5.8 | |

=== St. Michael's ===
St. Michael's
| Party | Candidate | Votes | % | ±% |
|---|---|---|---|---|
| Conservative | Michael Dixon* | 1,832 | 53.8 | ▼3.3 |
| Labour | Chris Smith | 1,201 | 35.3 | ▲9.0 |
| Green | John Appleton | 231 | 6.8 | ▼6.5 |
| Liberal Democrats | Colin Wilson | 139 | 4.1 | ▲0.7 |
| Majority | | 631 | 18.5 | ▼12.3 |
| Turnout | | 3,408 | 40.7 | ▲3.1 |
| Conservative hold | | Swing | ▼6.2 | |

=== St. Peter's ===
St. Peter's
| Party | Candidate | Votes | % | ±% |
|---|---|---|---|---|
| Conservative | Lynn Vera* | 1,567 | 49.4 | ▼4.4 |
| Labour | Tom Newton | 1,068 | 33.6 | ▲2.2 |
| Liberal Democrats | Peter Walton | 280 | 8.8 | ▲3.4 |
| Green | Auburn Langley | 250 | 7.9 | ▲1.5 |
| Majority | | 499 | 15.8 | ▼6.6 |
| Turnout | | 3,175 | 40.2 | ▼1.4 |

=== Washington Central ===
Washington Central
| Party | Candidate | Votes | % | ±% |
|---|---|---|---|---|
| Labour | Linda Williams* | 1,683 | 59.1 | ▲4.0 |
| Conservative | Derek Dunn | 883 | 31.0 | ▼0.3 |
| Green | Emma Cutting | 267 | 9.4 | ▲2.2 |
| Majority | | 800 | 28.1 | ▲4.3 |
| Turnout | | 2,846 | 34.1 | ▼0.5 |
| Labour hold | | Swing | ▲2.2 | |

=== Washington East ===
Washington East
| Party | Candidate | Votes | % | ±% |
|---|---|---|---|---|
| Labour | Logan Guy | 1,682 | 53.3 | ▲5.4 |
| Conservative | Chris Eynon | 1,223 | 38.7 | ▼4.4 |
| Green | Michal Chantkowski | 239 | 7.6 | ▲1.7 |
| Majority | | 459 | 14.5 | ▲9.7 |
| Turnout | | 3,158 | 35.2 | ▲0.8 |
| Labour hold | | Swing | ▲4.9 | |

=== Washington North ===
Washington North
| Party | Candidate | Votes | % | ±% |
|---|---|---|---|---|
| Labour | Jill Fletcher* | 1,349 | 61.2 | ▲8.4 |
| Conservative | Hilary Johnson | 552 | 25.0 | ▼6.7 |
| Green | Scott Burrows | 298 | 13.5 | ▲7.1 |
| Majority | | 797 | 36.2 | ▲15.1 |
| Turnout | | 2,203 | 27.8 | ▼1.9 |
| Labour hold | | Swing | ▲7.6 | |

=== Washington South ===
Washington South
| Party | Candidate | Votes | % | ±% |
|---|---|---|---|---|
| Labour | Graeme Miller* | 1,454 | 47.4 | ▲10.9 |
| Conservative | Peter Noble | 1,310 | 42.7 | ▲5.7 |
| Liberal Democrats | Sean Terry | 303 | 9.9 | ▲2.4 |
| Majority | | 144 | 4.7 | ▲4.2 |
| Turnout | | 3,078 | 40.1 | ▲5.0 |
| Labour hold | | Swing | ▲2.6 | |

=== Washington West ===
Washington West
| Party | Candidate | Votes | % | ±% |
|---|---|---|---|---|
| Labour | Dorothy Trueman* | 1,641 | 58.4 | ▲6.4 |
| Conservative | Sam Cosgrove | 878 | 31.2 | ▼1.4 |
| Green | Paul Leonard | 280 | 10.0 | ▲1.4 |
| Majority | | 763 | 27.1 | ▲7.7 |
| Turnout | | 2,812 | 32.4 | ▲0.3 |
| Labour hold | | Swing | ▲3.9 | |
