= 1999 Sunderland City Council election =

1999 UK local government election

The 1999 Sunderland Council election took place on 6 May 1999 to elect members of Sunderland Metropolitan Borough Council in Tyne and Wear, England. One third of the council was up for election and the Labour Party stayed in overall control of the council.

After the election, the composition of the council was:

- Labour 64
- Conservative 8
- Liberal Democrat 2
- Liberal 1

== Election result ==
The results saw Labour stay in control, but their leader, Bryn Sidaway, lost his seat after 16 years on the council. Sidaway lost in Hendon ward by 2 votes to Conservative Paul Maddison after 3 recounts, which was one of 4 gains made by the Conservatives. Labour blamed the defeat of Sidaway on dirty tricks after anonymous posters were displayed associating Sidaway with neo-Nazis, but this was denied by the Conservatives. Overall turnout was 20%, but was as low as 12.4% in Central ward.

Following the election Colin Anderson was elected as the new leader of the Labour group and the council.

Sunderland local election result 1999
Party	Seats	Gains	Losses	Net gain/loss	Seats %	Votes %	Votes	+/−
Labour	20			▼4	80	59.3		
Conservative	4			▲4	16	30.1		
Liberal Democrats	0			0	0	8.2		
Liberal	1			1	4	3.1		

Preceded by 1998 Sunderland City Council election	Sunderland City Council elections	Succeeded by 2000 Sunderland City Council election
