= 1998 Sunderland City Council election =

1998 UK local government election

The 1998 Sunderland Council election took place on 7 May 1998 to elect members of Sunderland Metropolitan Borough Council in Tyne and Wear, England. One third of the council was up for election and the Labour Party stayed in overall control of the council.

After the election, the composition of the council was:

- Labour 68
- Conservative 4
- Liberal Democrat 2
- Liberal 1

== Election result ==
Overall turnout in the election was 18%.

Sunderland local election result 1998
| Party | Seats | Gains | Losses | Net gain/loss | Seats % | Votes % | Votes | +/− |
|---|---|---|---|---|---|---|---|---|
| Labour | 24 | | | +1 | 88.9 | | | |
| Conservative | 2 | | | 0 | 7.4 | | | |
| Liberal Democrats | 1 | | | 0 | 3.7 | | | |
| Independent | 0 | | | -1 | 0 | | | |

| Preceded by 1996 Sunderland City Council election | Sunderland City Council elections | Succeeded by 1999 Sunderland City Council election |
