= 2000 Sunderland City Council election =

2000 UK local government election

The 2000 Sunderland Council election took place on 4 May 2000 to elect members of Sunderland Metropolitan Borough Council in Tyne and Wear, England. One third of the council was up for election and the Labour Party stayed in overall control of the council.

After the election, the composition of the council was:

- Labour 62
- Conservative 10
- Liberal Democrat 2
- Liberal 1

== Voting trial ==
After the 1999 election saw turnout drop as low as 12% in one ward, Sunderland became one of 31 councils which trialed ways of increasing turnout. Sunderland introduced mobile polling stations and also had polling booths in 3 libraries in the week before the election. Due to the early voting a student was able to legally vote while still 17 years old as she turned 18 on polling day itself.

== Election result ==
The results saw Labour remain in control of the council after losing 2 seats to the Conservatives.

Sunderland local election result 2000
Party	Seats	Gains	Losses	Net gain/loss	Seats %	Votes %	Votes	+/−
Labour	20			-2	80.0			
Conservative	4			+2	16.0			
Liberal Democrats	1			0	4.0			

Preceded by 1999 Sunderland City Council election	Sunderland City Council elections	Succeeded by 2002 Sunderland City Council election
