= 2002 Sunderland City Council election =

2002 UK local government election

The 2002 Sunderland Council election took place on 2 May 2002 to elect members of Sunderland Metropolitan Borough Council in Tyne and Wear, England. One third of the council was up for election and the Labour Party stayed in overall control of the council.

After the election, the composition of the council was:

- Labour 62
- Conservative 11
- Liberal Democrat 1
- Liberal 1

== Campaign ==
66 candidates contested the 25 seats that were available in the election. The election was said to be the "first time in recent memory" that every seat that was up for election was contested. Candidates included 6 from the British National Party and an independent, former Conservative group leader Ron Smith, in Pallion ward.

Postal voting in the election was up on the 2001 general election with 9,770 postal votes returned by 1 May, an increase of 3,500 on the general election.

== Election result ==
The results saw Labour easily holding control of the council after losing just 1 seat in the election. The only change came in St Peter's ward with the Conservatives gaining the seat from Labour. Meanwhile, none of the British National Party candidates managed to win a seat, but the party did come second in 2 wards, Town End Farm and Southwick. The results meant Labour held 62 seats after the election, compared to 11 for the Conservatives.

Following the election the Labour leader of the council for the previous 3 years, Colin Anderson, was defeated in a leadership election by Bob Symonds.

Sunderland local election result 2002
Party	Seats	Gains	Losses	Net gain/loss	Seats %	Votes %	Votes	+/−
Labour	21	0	1	-1	84.0	56.9	27,882	
Conservative	3	1	0	+1	12.0	31.9	15,629	
Liberal Democrats	1	0	0	0	4.0	7.9	3,852	
BNP	0	0	0	0	0	3.1	1,537	
Independent	0	0	0	0	0	0.2	121	

== Ward results ==
Castletown
Party	Candidate	Votes	%	±%
Labour	Thomas Foster	1,248	86.2	
Conservative	Gwennyth Gibson	199	13.8	
Majority		1,049	72.5	
Turnout		1,447		
Labour hold		Swing		

Central
Party	Candidate	Votes	%	±%
Labour	James Hollern	949	59.3	
Liberal Democrats	John Jackson	337	21.1	
Conservative	Dorreen Storey	314	19.6	
Majority		612	38.3	
Turnout		1,600		
Labour hold		Swing		

Colliery
Party	Candidate	Votes	%	±%
Labour	Maureen Ambrose	1,070	62.2	
Conservative	John Brown	651	37.8	
Majority		419	24.3	
Turnout		1,721		
Labour hold		Swing		

Eppleton
Party	Candidate	Votes	%	±%
Labour	Elizabeth Bell	1,239	67.0	
Conservative	David Wilson	611	33.0	
Majority		628	33.9	
Turnout		1,850		
Labour hold		Swing		

Fulwell
Party	Candidate	Votes	%	±%
Conservative	Norman Bohill	1,863	66.5	
Labour	Gary Hollern	609	21.7	
Liberal Democrats	Amie Leung	181	6.5	
BNP	Joseph Dobbie	148	5.3	
Majority		1,254	44.8	
Turnout		2,801		
Conservative hold		Swing		

Grindon
Party	Candidate	Votes	%	±%
Labour	James Scott	902	67.0	
Conservative	David Francis	445	33.0	
Majority		457	33.9	
Turnout		1,347		
Labour hold		Swing		

Hendon
Party	Candidate	Votes	%	±%
Labour	Thomas Martin	1,092	45.0	
Conservative	Kathryn Chamberlin	992	40.9	
BNP	David Guynan	340	14.0	
Majority		100	4.1	
Turnout		2,424		
Labour hold		Swing		

Hetton
Party	Candidate	Votes	%	±%
Labour	Richard Tate	1,186	75.1	
Conservative	Olwyn Bird	394	24.9	
Majority		792	50.1	
Turnout		1,580		
Labour hold		Swing		

Houghton
Party	Candidate	Votes	%	±%
Labour	Joseph Lawson	1,341	80.3	
Conservative	Gordon Newton	330	19.7	
Majority		1,011	60.5	
Turnout		1,671		
Labour hold		Swing		

Pallion
Party	Candidate	Votes	%	±%
Labour	Brian Dodds	1,148	44.4	
Conservative	Stephen Daughton	1,032	39.9	
Liberal Democrats	Elizabeth Foreman	286	11.1	
Independent	Ronald Smith	121	4.7	
Majority		116	4.5	
Turnout		2,587		
Labour hold		Swing		

Ryhope
Party	Candidate	Votes	%	±%
Labour	David Wares	1,451	69.8	
Conservative	William Dunn	628	30.2	
Majority		823	39.6	
Turnout		2,079		
Labour hold		Swing		

St Chad's
Party	Candidate	Votes	%	±%
Labour	Leslie Scott	1,433	58.2	
Conservative	Alistair Newton	1,030	41.8	
Majority		403	16.4	
Turnout		2,463		
Labour hold		Swing		

St Michael's
Party	Candidate	Votes	%	±%
Conservative	Margaret Forbes	1,923	66.9	
Labour	Phillip Gibson	950	33.1	
Majority		973	33.9	
Turnout		2,873		
Conservative hold		Swing		

St Peter's
Party	Candidate	Votes	%	±%
Conservative	Michael Arnott	1,047	39.4	
Labour	Christine Shattock	952	35.8	
Liberal Democrats	John Lennox	657	24.7	
Majority		95	3.6	
Turnout		2,656		
Conservative gain from Labour		Swing		

Shiney Row
Party	Candidate	Votes	%	±%
Labour	Kathryn Rolph	1,423	72.5	
Conservative	Marjorie Matthews	539	27.5	
Majority		884	45.1	
Turnout		1,962		
Labour hold		Swing		

Silksworth
Party	Candidate	Votes	%	±%
Labour	Peter Gibson	1,623	72.2	
Conservative	Patricia Francis	484	21.5	
BNP	David Rogers	141	6.3	
Majority		1,139	50.7	
Turnout		2,248		
Labour hold		Swing		

South Hylton
Party	Candidate	Votes	%	±%
Labour	Thomas Wright	898	68.4	
Conservative	Michael Dixon	415	31.6	
Majority		483	36.8	
Turnout		1,313		
Labour hold		Swing		

Southwick
Party	Candidate	Votes	%	±%
Labour	Paul Stewart	933	62.9	
BNP	Alan Brettwood	292	19.7	
Liberal Democrats	Jane Walters	167	11.3	
Conservative	Alice Mclaren	92	6.2	
Majority		641	43.2	
Turnout		1,484		
Labour hold		Swing		

Thorney Close
Party	Candidate	Votes	%	±%
Labour	Robert Kirby	1,011	67.1	
Conservative	Paula Wilkinson	260	17.3	
BNP	Joseph Dobbie	235	15.6	
Majority		751	49.9	
Turnout		1,506		
Labour hold		Swing		

Thornholme
Party	Candidate	Votes	%	±%
Liberal Democrats	Mark Greenfield	1,113	56.6	
Labour	Leonard Lamb	594	30.2	
Conservative	Neville Chamberlin	260	13.2	
Majority		519	26.4	
Turnout		1,967		
Liberal Democrats hold		Swing		

Town End Farm
Party	Candidate	Votes	%	±%
Labour	Richard Bell	831	61.1	
BNP	John Martin	381	28.0	
Conservative	Gillian Connor	149	10.9	
Majority		450	33.1	
Turnout		1,361		
Labour hold		Swing		

Washington East
Party	Candidate	Votes	%	±%
Labour	Derek Sleightholme	1,463	62.1	
Conservative	Jacqueline Atkinson	537	22.8	
Liberal Democrats	Avril Kitching	357	15.1	
Majority		926	39.3	
Turnout		2,357		
Labour hold		Swing		

Washington North
Party	Candidate	Votes	%	±%
Labour	James Walker	1,136	79.5	
Conservative	Kathleen Irvine	293	20.5	
Majority		843	59.0	
Turnout		1,429		
Labour hold		Swing		

Washington South
Party	Candidate	Votes	%	±%
Labour	Peter Young	1,325	49.8	
Conservative	Lee Martin	871	32.7	
Liberal Democrats	Owen Dumpleton	466	17.5	
Majority		454	17.1	
Turnout		2,662		
Labour hold		Swing		

Washington West
Party	Candidate	Votes	%	±%
Labour	William Stephenson	1,075	65.8	
Liberal Democrats	David Griffin	288	17.6	
Conservative	Justin Garrod	270	16.5	
Majority		787	48.2	
Turnout		1,633		
Labour hold		Swing		

Preceded by 2000 Sunderland City Council election	Sunderland City Council elections	Succeeded by 2003 Sunderland City Council election
