= 1976 Sunderland Metropolitan Borough Council election =

1976 UK local government election

← 1975	6 May 1976	1978 →

One third of 78 seats on Sunderland Metropolitan Borough Council 40 seats needed for a majority
	First party	Second party	Third party
Party	Labour	Conservative	Liberal
Seats before	52	23	1
Seats won	16	10	0
Seats after	49	26	1
Seat change	▼3	▲3	Steady
	Fourth party	Fifth party
Party	Ind. Labour Party	Independent
Seats before	1	1
Seats won	0	0
Seats after	1	1
Seat change	Steady	Steady
Majority party before election
Labour
Majority party after election
Labour

The 1976 Sunderland Metropolitan Borough Council election was held on 6 May 1976. A third of the seats on the Council were up for election, with each of the 26 council wards returning one councillor by first-past-the-post. The election was held on the same day as other local elections.

== Election results ==
Labour maintained a comfortable majority on the Council after the election, despite losing three seats to the Conservatives.

Sunderland Metropolitan Borough Council election results, 1976
		Candidates						Votes		
Party	Leader	Stood	Elected	Gained	Unseated	Net	% of total	%	No.	Net %
Labour	26	16	0	3	▼3	61.5	46.2	30,768	▲7.4	
Conservative	24	10	3	0	▲3	38.5	40.2	26,794	▲4.8	
Liberal	19	0	0	0	Steady	0	12.6	8,376	▼6.7	
Ind. Labour Party	1	0	0	0	Steady	0	0.5	366	▼2.3	
National Front	1	0	0	0	Steady	0	0.3	185	▲0.3	
Communist	2	0	0	0	Steady	0	0.2	136	Steady	

The election resulted in the following composition of the Council:

Party	Council
Labour	49
Conservatives	26
Liberal	1
Independent Labour	1
Independent	1
Total	78
Working majority	20
