= 2024 Sunderland City Council election =

2024 English local election

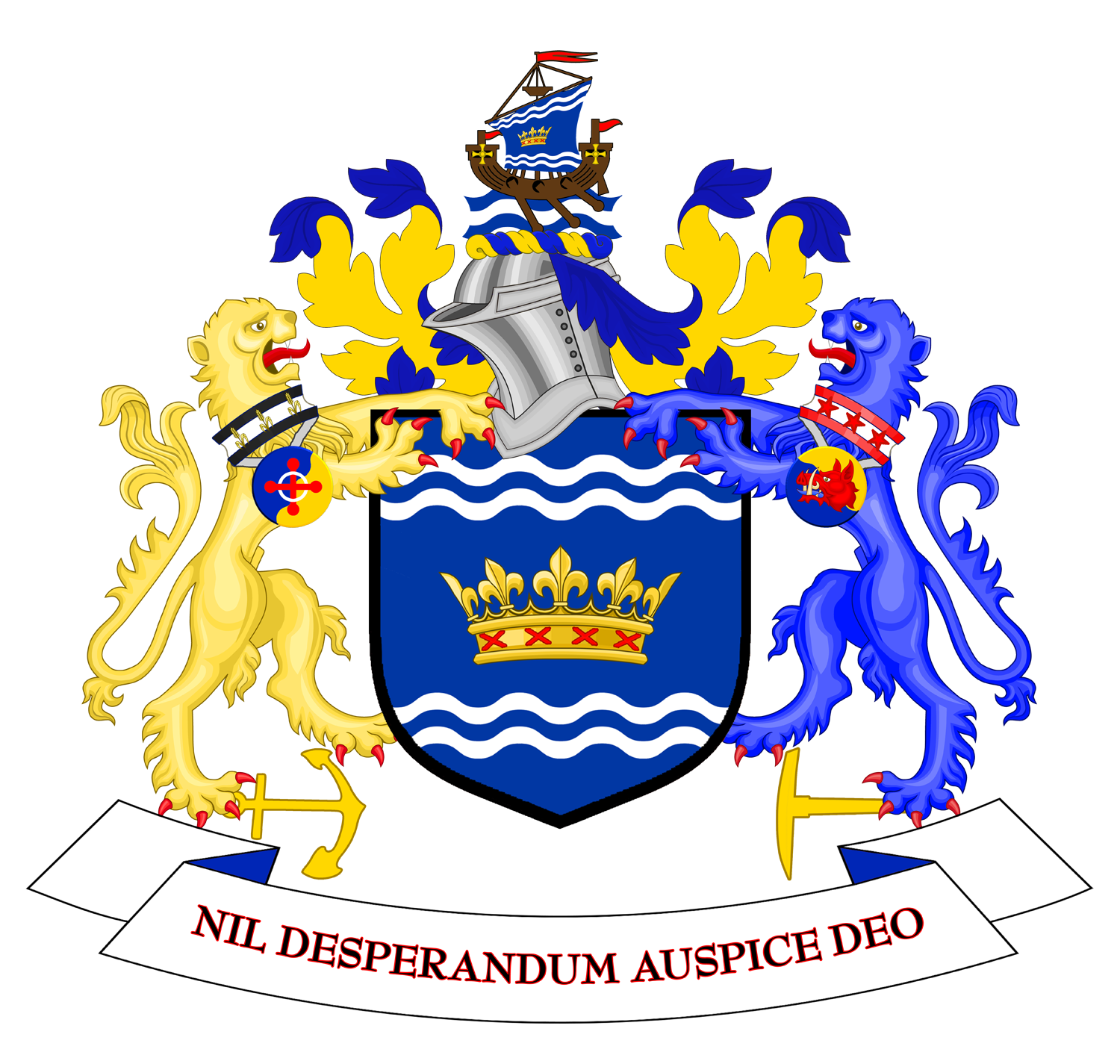
- 2 May 2024

25 of 75 seats on Sunderland City Council 38 seats needed for a majority

	First party	Second party	Third party
Leader	Graeme Miller	Paul Edgeworth	Antony Mullen
Party	Labour	Liberal Democrats	Conservative
Seats before	47	12	13
Seats won	18	4	3
Seats after	53	12	10
Seat change	▲6	-	▼3
	Fourth party	Fifth party
Party	Reform	Independent
Seats before	1	2
Seats won	0	0
Seats after	0	0
Seat change	▼1	▼2
- Winner of each seat at the 2024 Sunderland City Council election
Leader before election
Graeme Miller
Labour
Leader after election
Michael Mordey
Labour

The 2024 Sunderland City Council election took place on 2 May 2024 to elect members of Sunderland City Council. 25 of the 75 seats of the council were up for election. The election took place at the same time as other local elections across England.

The Labour Party remained in control of the council and the Liberal Democrats returned as the largest opposition party. After the election Labour's National Executive Committee (NEC) appointed Michael Mordey as group leader, replacing Graeme Miller who had led the council since 2018. The Lib Dem group leader Paul Edgeworth said it was "bad news" for Sunderland, adding: "Labour’s London and Newcastle HQs have clearly imposed a yes man for Keir Starmer and a yes man for Kim McGuinness." Michael Mordey was formally confirmed as leader of the council at a council meeting on 20 May 2024.

== Background ==
25 of the 75 seats were up for election, the last time councillors would be elected using the boundaries set in 2004.

Since the first election in 1973, Sunderland has been a strongly Labour council, which consistently achieves over 60% control of the council. However, in recent years they have lost seats to the Conservatives, UKIP and the Liberal Democrats. The seats up for election this year were last elected in 2021. In that election, Labour lost 9 seats, the Conservatives gained 6 and the Liberal Democrats gained 4.

Since the last election, three councillors defected from the Liberal Democrats, two to Labour and one became an independent. A Labour councillor (elected as a Conservative) now sits as an independent councillor after being accused of forcing a woman to marry.

== Results summary ==
2024 Sunderland City Council election
Party	This election			Full council			This election		
Party	Seats	Net	Seats %	Other	Total	Total %	Votes	Votes %	+/−
Labour	18	▲6	72.0	35	53	70.7	29,446	45.4	+0.1
Liberal Democrats	4	▼1	16.0	8	12	16.0	9,950	15.3	-1.8
Conservative	3	▼5	4.0	7	10	13.3	11,773	18.2	-4.4
Reform	0	-	0.0	0	0	0.0	9,377	14.5	+7.8
Green	0	-	0.0	0	0	0.0	3,355	5.2	-0.4
Independent	0	-	0.0	0	0	0.0	957	1.5	-1.3

== Ward results ==
An asterisk next to a candidate's name denotes an incumbent councillor.

=== Barnes ===
Barnes
Party	Candidate	Votes	%	±%
Labour Co-op	Fiona Tobin	1,191	39.8	−0.5
Conservative	Richard Dunn*	1,019	34.1	−1.7
Reform	Alan Bilton	415	13.9	+4.5
Liberal Democrats	Tim Ellis-Dale	203	6.8	−1.1
Green	Mark Tyers	162	5.4	−1.3
Majority		172		
Turnout		2,990		
Labour Co-op gain from Conservative		Swing		

=== Castle ===
Castle
Party	Candidate	Votes	%	±%
Labour	Denny Wilson*	1,130	62.9	−2.1
Reform	Keith Samme	346	19.3	+9.0
Conservative	Christopher Rose	160	8.9	−4.7
Liberal Democrats	Mia Coupland	98	5.5	−1.1
Green	Dawn Jackson	62	3.5	−1.1
Majority		784	43.7	
Turnout		1,796		
Labour hold		Swing		

=== Copt Hill ===
Copt Hill
Party	Candidate	Votes	%	±%
Labour	Kevin Johnston*	1,432	57.4	+6.6
Reform	Michael John Lorraine	395	15.8	+11.9
Conservative	Benjamin Davies-Scott	316	12.7	−1.8
Green	Andrew Robertson	245	9.8	+4.9
Liberal Democrats	Nana Boddy	105	4.2	+0.9
Majority		1,037	41.6	
Turnout		2,493		
Labour hold		Swing		

=== Doxford ===
Doxford
Party	Candidate	Votes	%	±%
Liberal Democrats	Paul Gibson*	1,441	49.3	−9.9
Labour	Liz Highmore	831	28.4	+4.6
Reform	Susan Lathan	359	12.3	+7.5
Conservative	George Brown	200	6.8	−3.2
Green	Martha Bradly	94	3.2	+1.0
Majority		610	20.9	
Turnout		2,925		
Liberal Democrats hold		Swing		

=== Fulwell ===
Fulwell
Party	Candidate	Votes	%	±%
Conservative	Michael Hartnack*	1,379	35.8	+9.3
Liberal Democrats	Miguel Smith	1,234	32.0	−16.1
Labour	Andy Stafford	791	20.6	+2.2
Reform	Lisa Marie Hilton	303	7.9	+4.7
Green	Kevin Lynch	127	3.3	+0.5
Majority		145	3.8	
Turnout		3,848	43.3	
Conservative hold		Swing		

=== Hendon ===
Hendon
Party	Candidate	Votes	%	±%
Labour	Stephen Lewis Elms	976	39.6	−4.0
Liberal Democrats	Ciarán Morrissey*	948	38.4	−4.6
Reform	Lynda Andrews	258	10.5	+6.2
Conservative	Georgina Gould	144	5.8	+0.6
Green	Helmut Izaks	125	5.0	+1.1
Majority		28	1.1	
Turnout		2,466	27.5	
Labour gain from Liberal Democrats		Swing		

=== Hetton ===
Hetton
Party	Candidate	Votes	%	±%
Labour Co-op	James Blackburn*	1,153	46.6	+1.7
Independent	David Geddis	721	29.2	−3.5
Reform	Stephen Holt	269	10.9	+4.6
Conservative	Connor Sinclair	145	5.9	−2.5
Green	Rachel Lowe	123	5.0	+1.9
Liberal Democrats	Ian Ellis	62	2.5	−1.1
Majority		432		
Turnout		2,473		
Labour Co-op hold		Swing		

=== Houghton ===
Houghton
Party	Candidate	Votes	%	±%
Labour	John Price*	1,692	61.4	+1.3
Reform	Lynda Alexander	379	13.8	+6.2
Conservative	Craig Morrison	249	9.0	−4.4
Independent	Donna Thomas	236	8.6	−1.3
Green	Alyson Kordbarlag	106	3.8	−0.4
Liberal Democrats	Sharon Boddy	93	3.4	−1.3
Majority		1,313		
Turnout		2,755		
Labour hold		Swing		

=== Millfield ===
Millfield
Party	Candidate	Votes	%	±%
Liberal Democrats	Niall Hodson*	1,450	56.0	−0.3
Labour	Syed Ali	742	28.6	−4.2
Reform	Kathryn Brown	156	6.0	+3.8
Green	Richard Bradley	118	4.6	+1.9
Conservative	Hardipsinh Barad	110	4.2	−0.8
Majority		708	27.3	
Turnout		2,590	32.1	
Liberal Democrats hold		Swing		

=== Pallion ===
Pallion
Party	Candidate	Votes	%	±%
Liberal Democrats	Steven Donkin	1,147	48.2	−16.1
Labour	Karren Boble	869	36.5	+8.8
Reform	Raymond Lathan	255	10.7	+7.8
Conservative	Gwennyth Gibson	73	3.1	−0.5
Green	Dorothy Lynch	38	1.6	+0.1
Majority		278	11.7	
Turnout		2,382		
Liberal Democrats hold		Swing		

=== Redhill ===
Redhill
Party	Candidate	Votes	%	±%
Labour Co-op	Alison Smith*	931	51.9	−7.4
Reform	Chris Eynon	579	32.3	+17.0
Conservative	Susan Leishman	156	8.7	−3.9
Liberal Democrats	Steve Dale	128	7.1	−0.7
Majority		352	19.6	
Turnout		1,794		
Labour Co-op hold		Swing		

=== Ryhope ===
Ryhope
Party	Candidate	Votes	%	±%
Labour	Helen Glancy	1,356	53.7	+2.2
Reform	Tony Thompson	656	26.0	+12.0
Conservative	Kevin Leonard	345	13.7	−9.0
Liberal Democrats	Janice Ellis	167	6.6	+1.2
Majority		700	27.7	
Turnout		2,524		
Labour hold		Swing		

=== Sandhill ===
Sandhill
Party	Candidate	Votes	%	±%
Liberal Democrats	Paul Edgeworth*	1,318	60.5	−3.5
Labour	Dennis Carroll	543	24.9	+0.4
Reform	Brain Alexander	215	9.9	+5.5
Conservative	Adam Aiston	60	2.8	−1.8
Green	Welsh Robert	42	1.9	−0.7
Majority		775	35.6	
Turnout		2,178		
Liberal Democrats hold		Swing		

=== Shiney Row ===
Shiney Row
Party	Candidate	Votes	%	±%
Labour Co-op	Katherine Mason-Gage*	1,605	57.9	+4.1
Reform	Robert Snowdon	466	16.8	+10.5
Conservative	Christine Reed	358	12.9	−8.3
Green	Thomas Mower	252	9.1	−2.0
Liberal Democrats	Michael Peacock	89	3.2	−1.7
Majority		1,139	41.1	
Turnout		2,770		
Labour hold		Swing		

=== Silksworth ===
Silksworth
Party	Candidate	Votes	%	±%
Labour	Sophie Clinton	1,322	51.9	−4.3
Green	Rachel Featherstone	551	21.6	+8.3
Reform	Michael Ellis	380	14.9	+6.5
Conservative	Owen Snaith	243	9.5	−9.5
Liberal Democrats	Mauro Amatosi	50	2.0	−1.0
Majority		771	30.3	
Turnout		2,546		
Labour hold		Swing		

=== Southwick ===
Southwick
Party	Candidate	Votes	%	±%
Labour	Kelly Chequer*	1,141	55.0	−5.2
Reform	James Wilson	453	21.8	+9.8
Conservative	Bryan Reynolds	227	10.9	−6.3
Green	Christopher Crozier	139	6.7	+0.2
Liberal Democrats	Michael Dagg	115	5.5	+1.5
Majority		688	33.2	
Turnout		2,075		
Labour hold		Swing		

=== St Anne's ===
St Anne's
Party	Candidate	Votes	%	±%
Labour Co-op	Lynne Dagg	869	38.9	−9.6
Conservative	Greg Peacock*	429	19.2	−15.1
Reform	Sam Wood-Brass	420	18.8	N/A
Green	Simon Hughes	419	18.8	+12.3
Liberal Democrats	Audrey Smith	96	4.3	−6.4
Majority		440	19.7	
Turnout		2,233		
Labour Co-op gain from Conservative		Swing		

=== St Chad's ===
St Chad's
Party	Candidate	Votes	%	±%
Conservative	Christopher Burnicle*	1,102	45.8	−4.4
Labour Co-op	Andrew Rowntree	833	34.6	+0.2
Reform	Shelia Samme	254	10.5	+4.2
Green	Scott Burrows	113	4.7	−0.1
Liberal Democrats	Anthony Usher	106	4.4	+0.1
Majority		269	11.2	
Turnout		2,408		
Conservative hold		Swing		

=== St Michael's ===
St Michael's
Party	Candidate	Votes	%	±%
Conservative	Lyall Reed*	1,525	45.7	+3.5
Labour	Jo Cooper	1,201	36.0	−4.6
Reform	Neil Farrer	270	8.1	+0.1
Green	John Appleton	242	7.2	+1.3
Liberal Democrats	Colin Wilson	102	3.1	−0.1
Majority		324	9.7	
Turnout		3,340		
Conservative hold		Swing		

=== St Peter's ===
St Peter's
Party	Candidate	Votes	%	±%
Labour Co-op	David Newey	1,167	38.3	+1.0
Conservative	Sam Johnston*	1,074	35.2	−8.2
Reform	David Craig	411	13.5	+8.6
Liberal Democrats	John Lennox	255	8.4	+0.2
Green	Liam Dufferwiel	143	4.7	−1.5
Majority		93	3.1	
Turnout		3,050		
Labour Co-op gain from Conservative		Swing		

=== Washington Central ===
Washington Central
Party	Candidate	Votes	%	±%
Labour Co-op	Dianne Elizabeth Snowdon*	1,673	62.9	−3.7
Conservative	Audrey Jaitay	445	16.7	−1.9
Reform	Aimee Trow	320	12.0	+6.2
Green	Raymond Moore	133	5.0	−0.3
Liberal Democrats	Linda Wood	90	3.4	−0.2
Majority		1,228	46.2	
Turnout		2,661		
Labour Co-op hold		Swing		

=== Washington East ===
Washington East
Party	Candidate	Votes	%	±%
Labour Co-op	Sean Laws*	1,632	56.6	+0.2
Conservative	Hilary Johnson	550	19.1	−7.5
Reform	Ashton Muncaster	466	16.2	+9.0
Liberal Democrats	Crispin Welby	233	8.1	+3.9
Majority		1,082	37.5	
Turnout		2,881		
Labour Co-op hold		Swing		

=== Washington North ===
Washington North
Party	Candidate	Votes	%	±%
Labour	Michael Walker*	1,398	64.2	−4.0
Reform	Elizabeth Brown	478	21.9	+14.3
Conservative	Svetlana Rakhimova	179	8.2	−4.7
Liberal Democrats	Carlton West	123	5.6	+0.5
Majority		920	42.3	
Turnout		2,178		
Labour hold		Swing		

=== Washington South ===
Washington South
Party	Candidate	Votes	%	±%
Labour Co-op	Brandon Mark Feeley	1,555	51.7	+8.1
Conservative	Peter Noble	890	29.6	−10.7
Reform	Paul Donaghy*	382	12.7	+5.1
Green	Michal Chantowski	96	3.2	−1.5
Liberal Democrats	Sean Terry	82	2.7	−1.1
Majority		665	22.1	
Turnout		3,005		
Labour Co-op gain from Reform		Swing		

=== Washington West ===
Washington West
Party	Candidate	Votes	%	±%
Labour Co-op	Jimmy Warne*	1,412	51.6	−5.2
Reform	Deborah Lorraine	492	18.0	+12.6
Conservative	Samantha Cosgrove	395	14.4	−6.7
Green	Paul Andrew Leonard	225	8.2	−0.2
Liberal Democrats	Andy Bex	215	7.8	−0.4
Majority		920	33.6	
Turnout		2,739		
Labour Co-op hold		Swing		

== By-elections ==
=== Hetton ===
Hetton by-election: 27 November 2025
Party	Candidate	Votes	%	±%
Reform	Ian McKinley	1,270	45.2	+35.4
Independent	David Geddis	689	25.6	−4.1
Labour	Lauren May Laws	611	22.7	−24.3
Liberal Democrats	Mia Coupland	113	4.2	+1.6
Conservative	Adam Aiston	61	2.3	−3.7
Majority		581	19.6	N/A
Turnout		2,746	29.3	
Registered electors		9,362		
Reform gain from Labour		Swing	▲19.0	
