= 1975 Sunderland Metropolitan Borough Council election =

1975 UK local government election

← 1973	1 May 1975	1976 →

One third of 78 seats on Sunderland Metropolitan Borough Council 40 seats needed for a majority
	First party	Second party	Third party
Party	Labour	Conservative	Liberal
Seats before	56	21	0
Seats won	15	9	1
Seats after	52	23	1
Seat change	▼4	▲2	▲1
	Fourth party	Fifth party
Party	Ind. Labour Party	Independent
Seats before	0	1
Seats won	1	0
Seats after	1	1
Seat change	▲1	Steady
Majority party before election
Labour
Majority party after election
Labour

The 1975 Sunderland Metropolitan Borough Council election was held on 1 May 1975. A third of the seats on the Council were up for election, with each of the 26 council wards returning one councillor by first-past-the-post. The election was held on the same day as other local elections.

== Background ==
The new Sunderland Metropolitan Borough Council had been formed following the Local Government Act 1972 - all councillors on the new council were elected in an all-up election in 1973. The order in which the councillors were elected in the 1973 election dictated their term serving, with third-place candidates in each ward serving two years and up for re-election in 1975. Labour had come out of the 1973 elections with a clear majority ahead of the Conservatives.

== Election results ==
Labour maintained a comfortable majority on the Council after the election, despite losing four seats. The Conservatives gained seats from Labour in Deptford and Pallion ward and Humbledon ward, whilst the Liberals took a seat from Labour in Houghton-le-Spring. An Independent Labour Party candidate took a seat from Labour in Silksworth.

Sunderland Metropolitan Borough Council election results, 1975
Party	Seats	Gains	Losses	Net gain/loss	Seats %	Votes %	Votes	+/−
Labour	15	0	4	▼4	57.7	38.8	22,066	▼12.8
Conservative	9	2	0	▲2	34.6	35.4	20,166	▼0.7
Liberal	1	1	0	▲1	3.8	19.3	10,995	▲12.4
All Sunderland District Action Group	0	0	0	Steady	0	3.4	1,925	▼3.4
Ind. Labour Party	1	1	0	▲1	3.8	2.8	1,593	▲1.3
Communist	0	0	0	Steady	0	0.2	123	▼0.1
Independent	0	0	0	Steady	0	0.1	42	▼1.2

The election resulted in the following composition of the Council:

Party	Council
Labour	52
Conservatives	23
Liberal	1
Independent Labour	1
Independent	1
Total	78
Working majority	26
