= 2023 Sunderland City Council election =

2023 UK local government election

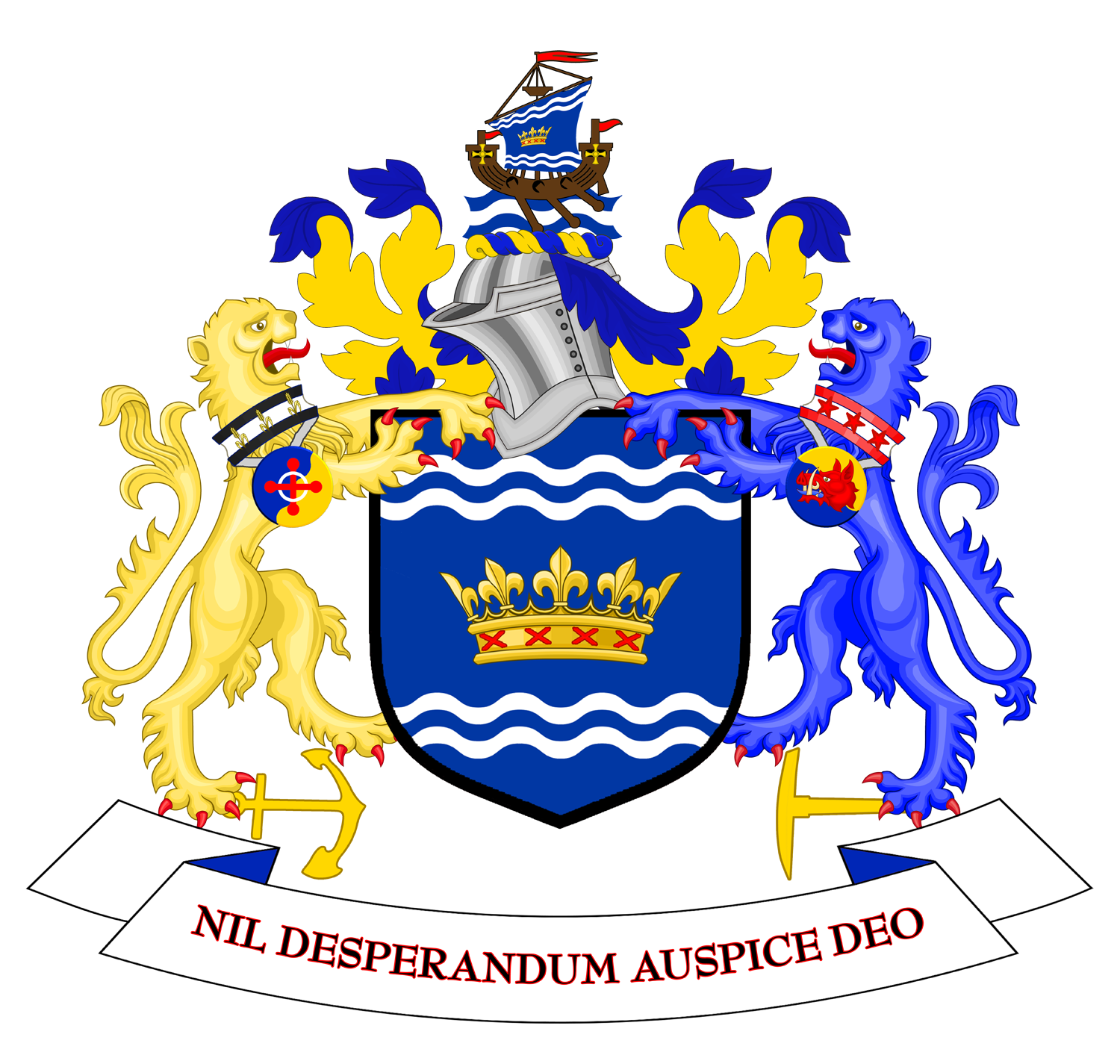
- 4 May 2023

25 of 75 seats on Sunderland City Council 38 seats needed for a majority

	First party	Second party	Third party
Leader	Graeme Miller	Niall Hodson	Antony Mullen
Party	Labour	Liberal Democrats	Conservative
Seats before	43	14	15
Seats won	16	5	3
Seats after	45	15	13
Seat change	▲2	▲1	▼2
Popular vote	28,796	10,882	14,358
	Fourth party	Fifth party
Party	Reform	Independent
Seats before	1	2
Seats won	0	0
Seats after	1	0
Seat change	-	▼2
Popular vote	4,230	1,719
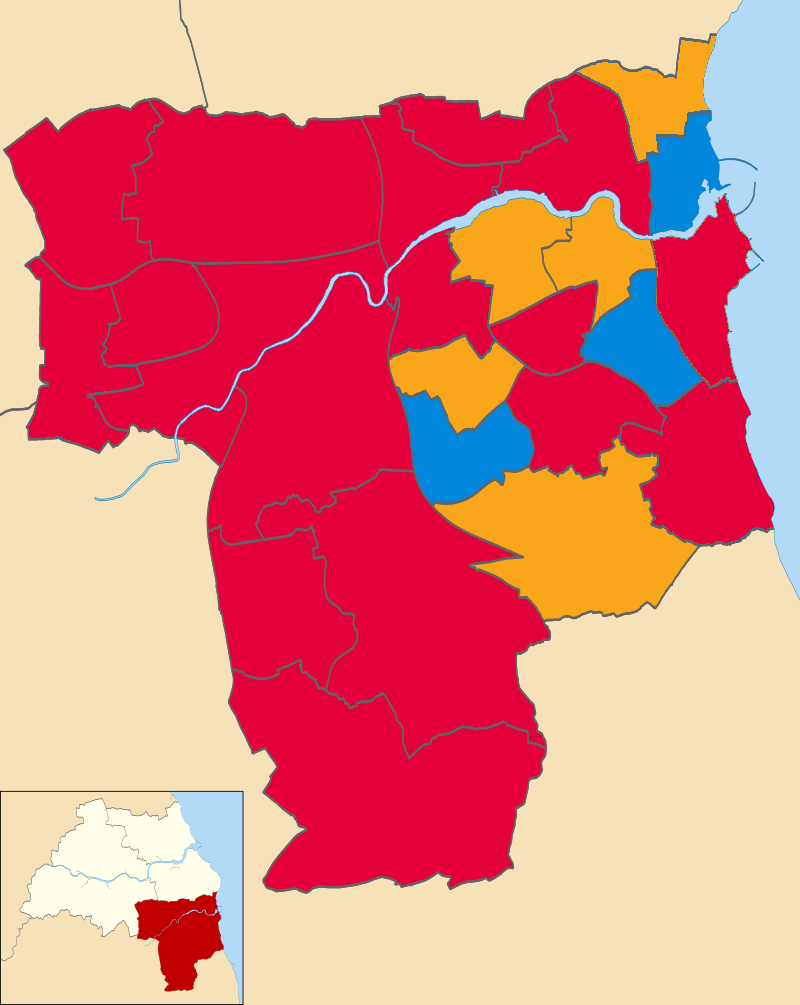
- 2023 Sunderland City Council Election Map
Leader before election
Graeme Miller
Labour
Leader after election
Graeme Miller
Labour

The 2023 Sunderland City Council election took place on 4 May 2023 to elect members of Sunderland City Council. There were 25 of the 75 seats of the council up for election, being the usual third of the council. The election took place at the same time as other local elections across England.

Labour retained its majority on the council. The Liberal Democrats overtook the Conservatives to become the largest opposition party. The Liberal Democrats were led into the election by Niall Hodson, but he was replaced as party leader after the election by Paul Edgeworth.

== Background ==
25 of the 75 seats will be up for election

Since the first election in 1973, Sunderland has been a strongly Labour council, which consistently achieves over 60% control of the council. However, in recent years they have lost seats to the Conservatives, UKIP and Liberal Democrats. The seats up for election this year were last elected in 2019. In that election, Labour lost 10 seats, The Conservatives gained 4 and Liberal Democrats gained 3.

In 2022, Labour defied speculation they would continue to haemorrhage, Leader Graeme Miller commented that "It was a good night" for his party because they "stopped the rot".

Since the last election, three councillors have defected from the Conservatives, one to Labour, one to Reform UK, and one who currently sits as an independent and is not standing for re-election. In the last election the Conservatives were outperformed by the Liberal Democrats, who gained one more seat. There was speculation that the Liberal Democrats could take over from the Conservatives as the main opposition party on the council.

== Results summary ==
2023 Sunderland City Council election
Party	This election				Full council			This election		
Party	Candidates	Seats	Net	Seats %	Other	Total	Total %	Votes	Votes %	+/−
Labour	{{{candidates}}}	16	▲2	66.7	29	45	60.0	28,796	45.3	▲0.7
Liberal Democrats	{{{candidates}}}	5	▲1	20.8	10	15	20.0	10,882	17.1	▲1.6
Conservative	{{{candidates}}}	3	▼2	4.0	10	13	17.3	14,358	22.6	▼8.3
Reform	{{{candidates}}}	0	-	0.0	1	1	2.7	4,230	6.7	▲6.7
Green	{{{candidates}}}	0	-	0.0	0	0	0.0	3,533	5.6	▼1.0
Independent	{{{candidates}}}	0	-	0.0	0	0	0.0	1,719	2.7	▲0.6
Monster Raving Loony	{{{candidates}}}	0	-	0.0	0	0	0.0	40	0.1	-
Communist	{{{candidates}}}	0	-	0.0	0	0	0.0	27	0.1	-

== Council composition ==
In the last council, the composition of the council was:

↓
43	15	14	1	2
Labour	Conservative	Lib; Dem	Reform UK	Independent

After the election, the composition of the council was:

↓
45	15	13	1
Labour	Lib; Dem	Conservative	Reform UK

== Ward results ==
An asterisk next to a candidate's name denotes an incumbent councillor. All changes shown below are in relation to the 2019 local election.

=== Barnes ===
Barnes
Party	Candidate	Votes	%	±%
Labour Co-op	Abul Bakkar Haque	1,272	40.3	+1.7
Conservative	Kevin Leonard	1,130	35.8	−11.8
Reform	Alan Douglas Bilton	296	9.4	New
Liberal Democrats	Tim Ellis-Dale	248	7.9	+0.2
Green	Mark Tyers	212	6.7	+0.5
Majority		142		
Turnout				
Labour gain from Conservative		Swing		

=== Castle ===
Castle
Party	Candidate	Votes	%	±%
Labour	Stephen Foster*	1,235	65.0	+0.8
Conservative	Paul Burke	258	13.6	−11.2
Reform	Peter Middleton	196	10.3	New
Liberal Democrats	Mia Coupland	125	6.6	New
Green	Gary Ogle	87	4.6	−6.4
Majority				
Turnout				
Labour hold		Swing		

=== Copt Hill ===
Copt Hill
Party	Candidate	Votes	%	±%
Labour	Melanie Thornton*	1,273	50.8	+6.5
Independent	Phillip John Dowell	564	22.5	New
Conservative	Pat Francis	364	14.5	−3.1
Green	Andrew Robertson	122	4.9	−2.3
Reform	Sheila Samme	98	3.9	New
Liberal Democrats	Nana Boddy	83	3.3	+0.5
Majority				
Turnout				
Labour hold		Swing		

=== Doxford ===
Doxford
Party	Candidate	Votes	%	±%
Liberal Democrats	Heather Fagan*	1,788	59.2	+9.5
Labour Co-op	Andrew John Rowntree	719	23.8	−4.2
Conservative	John Scott Wiper	301	10.0	−8.6
Reform	Dawn Hurst	146	4.8	New
Green	Auburn Langley	67	2.2	−1.6
Majority				
Turnout				
Liberal Democrats hold		Swing		

=== Fulwell ===
Fulwell
Party	Candidate	Votes	%	±%
Liberal Democrats	Peter Walton	1,879	48.1	−4.3
Conservative	David Sinclair	1,036	26.5	−3.4
Labour	Andy Stafford	718	18.4	+2.9
Reform	Lisa Hilton	126	3.2	New
Green	Liam Dufferwiel	108	2.8	+0.6
Monster Raving Loony	Jumping Jack Flash	40	1.0	New
Majority		843		
Turnout		3,912	43.9	▼3.4
Liberal Democrats gain from Conservative		Swing		

=== Hendon ===
Hendon (countermanded)
Party	Candidate	Votes	%	±%
Labour	Lynda Scanlan*	878	43.6	−2.1
Liberal Democrats	Steve Donkin	865	43.0	+4.8
Conservative	Georgina Young	104	5.2	−6.6
Reform	Ian Jones	87	4.3	New
Green	Helmut Izaks	79	3.9	−0.5
Majority		13		
Turnout				
Labour hold		Swing		

The election in Hendon was countermanded due to the death of the Conservative candidate, Syed Ali. It was held on 15 June.

=== Hetton ===
Hetton
Party	Candidate	Votes	%	±%
Labour Co-op	Iain Scott*	1,117	44.9	−0.2
Independent	David Geddis	812	32.7	−3.6
Conservative	Connor Sinclair	210	8.4	−4.0
Reform	Sam Wood-Brass	157	6.3	New
Green	Rachel Lowe	101	4.1	New
Liberal Democrats	Ian David Ellis	89	3.6	−2.6
Majority				
Turnout				
Labour hold		Swing		

Iain Scott was elected in a by-election on 30 September 2021 due to the death of the incumbent Labour councillor Doris Turner.

=== Houghton ===
Houghton
Party	Candidate	Votes	%	±%
Labour	Juliana Herron*	1,625	60.1	+4.4
Conservative	Craig Morrison	363	13.4	−9.5
Independent	Donna Thomas	269	9.9	−5.8
Reform	Steve Holt	206	7.6	New
Liberal Democrats	Sharon Boddy	128	4.7	New
Green	Alyson Kordbarlag	113	4.2	−1.5
Majority			46.7	
Turnout			27.0	−5.3
Labour hold		Swing		

=== Millfield ===
Millfield
Party	Candidate	Votes	%	±%
Liberal Democrats	Julia Potts*	1,497	56.3	+7.3
Labour	Kingsley Osahon Okojie	872	32.8	−4.1
Conservative	Hardip Barad	134	5.0	−5.0
Green	Richard Peter Bradley	71	2.7	+0.1
Reform	David Craig	59	2.2	New
Communist	Julio Romero Johnson	27	1.0	−0.2
Majority				
Turnout				
Liberal Democrats hold		Swing		

=== Pallion ===
Pallion
Party	Candidate	Votes	%	±%
Liberal Democrats	Martin Haswell*	1,659	64.3	+6.4
Labour	Karren Noble	715	27.7	−0.8
Conservative	Gwennyth Gibson	93	3.6	−6.9
Reform	Raymond Lathan	75	2.9	New
Green	Dorothy Lynch	39	1.5	−1.6
Majority				
Turnout				
Liberal Democrats hold		Swing		

=== Redhill ===
Redhill
Party	Candidate	Votes	%	±%
Labour Co-op	John Usher*	1,015	59.3	+3.0
Reform	Neil Farrer	262	15.3	New
Conservative	Sue Leishman	215	12.6	−4.6
Liberal Democrats	Steven Dale	133	7.8	−13.9
Green	Justine Merton-Scott	87	5.1	+0.4
Majority				
Turnout		1,712	21.9	
Labour gain from UKIP		Swing		

John Usher was elected in a by-election on 3 March 2022 due to the resignation of the incumbent Independent councillor Keith Jenkins.

=== Ryhope ===
Ryhope
Party	Candidate	Votes	%	±%
Labour Co-op	Lindsey Leonard	1,348	51.5	+5.8
Conservative	Lorraine Douglas	596	22.7	−22.0
Reform	Tony Thompson	368	14.0	New
Green	Micheal Harker	166	6.3	−3.3
Liberal Democrats	Janice Ellis	142	5.4	New
Majority				
Turnout				
Labour gain from UKIP		Swing		

=== Sandhill ===
Sandhill
Party	Candidate	Votes	%	±%
Liberal Democrats	Stephen O'Brien*	1,457	64.0	+10.8
Labour	Keith Lakeman	557	24.5	−8.9
Conservative	Christine Reed	104	4.6	−5.8
Reform	Ciera Hudspith	100	4.4	New
Green	Martha Bradley	60	2.6	−0.4
Majority				
Turnout				
Liberal Democrats hold		Swing		

=== Shiney Row ===
Shiney Row
Party	Candidate	Votes	%	±%
Labour Co-op	David Snowdon*	1,501	53.8	−1.4
Conservative	Richard Vardy	592	21.2	+0.8
Green	Thomas Mower	310	11.1	−0.4
Reform	Morgon Proud	177	6.3	New
Liberal Democrats	Michael Peacock	137	4.9	New
Independent	Lynsey Gibson	74	2.7	New
Majority				
Turnout				
Labour hold		Swing		

=== Silksworth ===
Silksworth
Party	Candidate	Votes	%	±%
Labour	Joanne Laverick	1,459	56.2	±0.0
Conservative	Owen Snaith	493	19.0	−13.1
Green	Chrisphoer Crozier	346	13.3	+1.6
Reform	Michael Ellis	218	8.4	New
Liberal Democrats	Mauro Amatosi	78	3.0	New
Majority				
Turnout				
Labour hold		Swing		

=== Southwick ===
Southwick
Party	Candidate	Votes	%	±%
Labour	Michael Butler*	1,256	60.2	+1.6
Conservative	Liam Ritchie	359	17.2	−10.7
Reform	Paul Watt	250	12.0	New
Green	Emma Cutting	136	6.5	−6.0
Liberal Democrats	Helder Costa	84	4.0	New
Majority				
Turnout				
Labour hold		Swing		

=== St Anne's ===
St Anne's
Party	Candidate	Votes	%	±%
Labour Co-op	Catherine Hunter	981	48.5	−0.3
Conservative	Pam Mann*	694	34.3	−4.3
Liberal Democrats	Elaine Rumfitt	216	10.7	New
Green	Simon Hughes	131	6.5	−6.1
Majority				
Turnout				
Labour gain from UKIP		Swing		

Pam Mann won this seat in 2019 as a UKIP candidate.

=== St Chad's ===
St Chad's
Party	Candidate	Votes	%	±%
Conservative	Dominic McDonough*	1,296	50.2	+0.7
Labour	Martin Old	888	34.4	+0.7
Reform	Graham Hurst	164	6.3	New
Green	Scott Burrows	124	4.8	−3.1
Liberal Democrats	Anthony Usher	112	4.3	−4.1
Majority		408		
Turnout				
Conservative hold		Swing		

=== St Michael's ===
St Michael's
Party	Candidate	Votes	%	±%
Conservative	Adele Graham-King	1,432	42.2	−11.6
Labour	Chris Smith	1,378	40.6	+5.3
Reform	Chris Eynon	273	8.0	New
Green	John Appleton	201	5.9	−0.9
Liberal Democrats	Colin Wilson	110	3.2	−0.9
Majority				
Turnout				
Conservative hold		Swing		

=== St Peter's ===
St Peter's
Party	Candidate	Votes	%	±%
Conservative	Josh McKeith*	1,348	43.4	+9.8
Labour Co-op	David Newey	1,160	37.3	−12.1
Liberal Democrats	John Lennox	254	8.2	−0.6
Green	Rachel Featherstone	193	6.2	−1.7
Reform	Keith Samme	152	4.9	New
Majority		188		
Turnout		3,111	39.3	
Conservative hold		Swing		

=== Washington Central ===
Washington Central
Party	Candidate	Votes	%	±%
Labour Co-op	Beth Jones	1,806	66.6	+7.5
Conservative	Audrey Jaitay	505	18.6	−12.4
Reform	Dean Hilton	158	5.8	New
Green	Raymond Moore	145	5.3	−4.1
Liberal Democrats	Linda Wood	99	3.6	New
Majority		1,301		
Turnout		2,720	32.7	
Labour hold		Swing		

=== Washington East ===
Washington East
Party	Candidate	Votes	%	±%
Labour Co-op	Fiona Miller*	1,651	56.4	+3.1
Conservative	Hiliary Johnson	780	26.6	−12.1
Reform	Lynda Alexander	210	7.2	New
Green	Michal Chantokowski	166	5.7	−1.9
Liberal Democrats	Richard Bond	122	4.2	New
Majority		871		
Turnout		2,936	33.1	
Labour hold		Swing		

=== Washington North ===
Washington North
Party	Candidate	Votes	%	±%
Labour	Peter Walker*	1,455	68.2	+7.0
Conservative	Svetlana Rakhimova	275	12.9	−12.1
Reform	Elizabeth Anne Brown	163	7.6	New
Green	Kevin Lynch	131	6.1	−7.4
Liberal Democrats	Graeme Arnott	108	5.1	New
Majority		1,180		
Turnout		2,138	26.9	
Labour hold		Swing		

=== Washington South ===
Washington South
Party	Candidate	Votes	%	±%
Labour Co-op	Joanne Chapman	1,311	43.6	−3.8
Conservative	Peter Noble	1,210	40.3	−2.4
Reform	Deborah Lorraine	229	7.6	New
Green	Robert Welsh	142	4.7	New
Liberal Democrats	Sean Terry	114	3.8	−6.1
Majority		101		
Turnout		3,012	39.5	
Labour gain from Green		Swing		

=== Washington West ===
Washington West
Party	Candidate	Votes	%	±%
Labour	Harry Trueman*	1,534	56.8	−1.6
Conservative	Samantha Cosgrove	570	21.1	−10.1
Green	Paul Leonard	228	8.4	−1.6
Liberal Democrats	Andrew Bex	220	8.2	New
Reform	Kathryn Brown	147	5.4	New
Majority		964		
Turnout		2,705	31.5	
Labour hold		Swing		
