= 1973 Sunderland Metropolitan Borough Council election =

1973 UK local government election

10 May 1973	1975 →

All 78 seats on Sunderland Metropolitan Borough Council 40 seats needed for a majority
	First party	Second party	Third party
Party	Labour	Conservative	Independent
Seats won	56	21	1
Majority party after election
Labour

The 1973 Sunderland Metropolitan Borough Council election was held on 10 May 1973 as part of the first elections to the new local authorities established by the Local Government Act 1972 in England and Wales. The entirety of the new 78-seat council was up for election, with each of the 26 new council wards returning three councillors by first-past-the-post.

== Background ==
The election took place following the elections to the Tyne and Wear County Council in April. The Local Government Act 1972 stipulated that the elected members were to shadow and eventually take over from the predecessor corporation on 1 April 1974. The order in which the councillors were elected dictated their term serving, with third-place candidates serving two years and up for re-election in 1975, second-placed three years expiring in 1976 and first-placed five years until 1978.

== Election results ==
The election resulted in a clear majority for the Labour Party, which won 56 of the 78 seats on the new Council.

Sunderland Metropolitan Borough Council election results, 1973
		Candidates						Votes		
Party	Leader	Stood	Elected	Gained	Unseated	Net	% of total	%	No.	Net %
Labour	76	56	56	N/A	56	71.8	51.6	65,688	N/A	
Conservative	41	21	21	N/A	21	26.9	36.1	45,933	N/A	
Liberal	18	0	0	N/A	0	0	6.9	8,839	N/A	
Independent	7	1	1	N/A	1	1.3	3.5	4,473	N/A	
Ind. Labour Party	3	0	0	N/A	0	0	1.5	1,961	N/A	
Communist	3	0	0	N/A	0	0	0.3	365	N/A	

The election resulted in the following composition of the Council:

Party	Council
Labour	56
Conservatives	21
Independent	1
Total	78
Working majority	34
