= 2008 Sunderland City Council election =

2008 UK local government election

- 1 May 2008

One third of 75 seats on Sunderland City Council 38 seats needed for a majority
	First party	Second party	Third party
Party	Labour	Conservative	Independent
Seats before	53	17	4
Seats won	14	9	2
Seats after	48	22	4
Seat change	▼5	▲5	0
	Fourth party
Party	Liberal Democrats
Seats before	1
Seats won	0
Seats after	1
Seat change	0
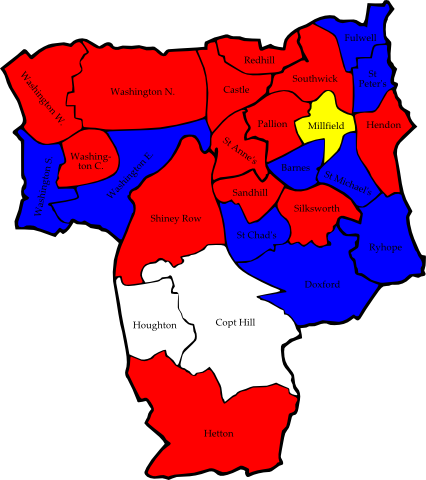
- Map of the 2008 Sunderland City Council election results. Labour in red, Conservatives in blue, Lib Dems in yellow and Independents in white.
Majority party before election
Labour
Majority party after election
Labour

The 2008 Sunderland Council election took place on 1 May 2008 to elect members of Sunderland Metropolitan Borough Council in Tyne and Wear, England. One third of the council was up for election and the Labour Party stayed in overall control of the council.

== Background ==
Before the election the council had 53 Labour, 17 Conservative, 4 independents and 1 Liberal Democrat councillors. 25 seats were contested in the election with a record 70,828 voters being registered to vote by post, a third of all registered voters.

In the period since the previous local elections, the Conservatives had won a seat from Labour in a by-election in September 2007 in Washington East. Two Labour councillors who had left the party in November 2006 to sit as Independents, George Blyth in Doxford and Bryn Sidaway in Hendon, retired at this election.

== Election result ==
The results saw Labour remain in control of the council, but with a reduced majority after the Conservative Party gained 5 seats, including 4 from Labour. The Conservatives gained 2 seats from Labour in Washington and a seat each in Ryhope and St Chads, while also taking a seat from an independent, formerly Labour, councillor in Doxford. The Conservative gains took the party to 22 seats, compared to 48 for Labour. Labour also lost 2 seats to independents in Copt Hill and Houghton wards, but did take one seat back in Hendon which had been held by an independent. This meant there were 4 independents on the council, while the Liberal Democrats remained on 1 seat. Overall turnout in the election was 34.9%.

The leader of the Conservatives on the council, Lee Martin, put the Labour losses partly down to national issues such as the abolition of the 10 pence income tax rate and partly down to local issues. The Labour leader of the council described the results as "mid-term blues", while the defeat of the Labour cabinet member Joseph Lawson in Houghton ward to an independent was put down to plans to shut a quarry in the area.

Sunderland local election result 2008
Party	Seats	Gains	Losses	Net gain/loss	Seats %	Votes %	Votes	+/−
Labour	13	1	6	▼5	52.0	39.6	29,109	▼3.7
Conservative	9	5	0	▲5	36.0	32.0	23,547	▲3.9
Liberal Democrats	1	0	0	0	4.0	11.6	8,543	▲2.9
BNP	0	0	0	0	0.0	10.2	7,540	▼0.4
Independent	2	2	2	0	8.0	6.4	4,710	▼1.9
The Left Party	0	0	0	0	0.0	0.1	90	▲0.1
UKIP	0	0	0	0	0.0	0.1	40	0.0

This resulted in the following composition of the council:

Party	Previous Council	New Council
Labour	53	48
Conservatives	17	22
Independent	4	4
Liberal Democrats	1	1
Total	75	75
Working majority	31	21

== Ward results ==
Barnes
Party	Candidate	Votes	%	±%
Conservative	Anthony Morrissey	1,712	51.6	−2.1
Labour	Philip Routledge	809	24.4	+1.7
Liberal Democrats	Gulya Dixon	489	14.7	−0.2
BNP	Robert Fletcher	308	9.3	+0.6
Majority		903	27.2	−3.8
Turnout		3,318	38.0	+0.3
Conservative hold		Swing		

Castle
Party	Candidate	Votes	%	±%
Labour	Tommy Foster	1,376	52.8	−13.2
BNP	John Humble	350	13.4	−2.2
Conservative	Clair Hall	343	13.2	+5.7
Independent	Ronald McQuillan	264	10.1	−0.8
Liberal Democrats	Jon Dewart	182	7.0	+7.0
The Left Party	Gary Duncan	90	3.5	+3.5
Majority		1,026	39.4	−11.1
Turnout		2,605	30.5	+0.5
Labour hold		Swing		

Copt Hill
Party	Candidate	Votes	%	±%
Independent	Derrick Smith	1,487	45.6	+2.7
Labour	Joan Carthy	1,123	34.5	−1.1
Conservative	George Brown	451	13.8	+2.7
BNP	Terence Woolford	197	6.0	+0.5
Majority		364	11.2	+3.9
Turnout		3,258	36.7	+0.7
Independent gain from Labour		Swing		

Doxford
Party	Candidate	Votes	%	±%
Conservative	Richard Vardy	1,178	41.6	+17.5
Labour	Linda Mitchell	991	35.0	−0.8
Liberal Democrats	Lewis Green	371	13.1	+13.1
BNP	Peter Swain	292	10.3	+1.9
Majority		187	6.6	
Turnout		2,832	35.7	−0.5
Conservative gain from Labour		Swing		

The incumbent Labour councillor, George Blyth, had been elected in 2004 as a Labour candidate, but subsequently left the party to sit as an Independent councillor, and retired at this election.

Fulwell
Party	Candidate	Votes	%	±%
Conservative	Bob Francis	2,092	53.2	−0.7
Labour	Bob Price	1,032	26.2	+1.1
Liberal Democrats	Geoffrey Pryke	459	11.7	−1.4
BNP	Frederick Donkin	352	8.9	+1.0
Majority		1,060	26.9	−1.9
Turnout		3,935	43.5	+0.8
Conservative hold		Swing		

Hendon
Party	Candidate	Votes	%	±%
Labour	Michael Mordey	874	36.4	−6.6
Independent	Sammy Doran	557	23.2	+4.6
Conservative	Deborah Lorraine	517	21.5	+3.3
BNP	Ian Sayers	234	9.7	−5.2
Liberal Democrats	Nathan Hazlett	219	9.1	+9.1
Majority		317	13.2	−11.2
Turnout		2,401	29.5	−0.7
Labour gain from Independent		Swing		

The incumbent Labour councillor, Bryn Sidaway, had been elected in 2004 as a Labour candidate, but subsequently left the party to sit as an Independent councillor, and retired at this election.

Hetton
Party	Candidate	Votes	%	±%
Labour	Jim Blackburn	1,843	69.2	+13.9
Conservative	Douglas Middlemiss	821	30.8	+18.8
Majority		1,022	38.4	+1.1
Turnout		2,664	30.6	−0.7
Labour hold		Swing		

Houghton
Party	Candidate	Votes	%	±%
Independent	Sheila Ellis	1,415	44.8	+26.4
Labour	Joe Lawson	1,168	37.0	−13.7
Conservative	Edward Allen	355	11.2	−0.3
BNP	Kevin Robe	219	6.9	−1.4
Majority		247	7.8	
Turnout		3,157	35.8	+2.0
Independent gain from Labour		Swing		

Millfield
Party	Candidate	Votes	%	±%
Liberal Democrats	Paul Dixon	1,059	46.0	+15.5
Labour	Bob Bowman	558	24.3	−8.6
Conservative	Gwennyth Gibson	346	15.0	+1.6
BNP	Christopher Lathan	179	7.8	−0.9
Independent	Margaret Snaith	84	3.7	−3.6
UKIP	Pauline Featonby-Warren	40	1.7	−1.4
Independent	Gary Hollern	35	1.5	+1.5
Majority		501	21.8	
Turnout		2,301	32.3	+0.5
Liberal Democrats hold		Swing		

Pallion
Party	Candidate	Votes	%	±%
Labour	Amy Wilson	1,055	44.3	−0.4
Conservative	Michael Leadbitter	645	27.1	+8.4
BNP	Paul Humble	377	15.8	+4.1
Liberal Democrats	Sham Vedhara	305	12.8	+1.1
Majority		410	17.2	−8.7
Turnout		2,382	31.6	+1.1
Labour hold		Swing		

Redhill
Party	Candidate	Votes	%	±%
Labour	Bryan Charlton	1,315	49.5	−6.6
BNP	John Martin	517	19.5	−3.5
Independent	Ian Leadbitter	359	13.5	+6.6
Conservative	Martin Anderson	279	10.5	−0.3
Liberal Democrats	Rob Boyce	185	7.0	+7.0
Majority		798	30.1	−3.0
Turnout		2,655	31.0	+1.1
Labour hold		Swing		

Ryhope
Party	Candidate	Votes	%	±%
Conservative	Christopher Fairs	1,012	33.7	+3.5
Labour	Ronald Bainbridge	983	32.7	−8.6
Independent	Patrick Lavelle	509	16.9	+1.6
BNP	Wayne Watts	291	9.7	−3.5
Liberal Democrats	David Slone	209	7.0	+7.0
Majority		29	1.0	
Turnout		3,004	37.3	+1.2
Conservative gain from Labour		Swing		

Sandhill
Party	Candidate	Votes	%	±%
Labour	Jim Scott	1,196	47.0	−9.8
Conservative	Paula Wilkinson	662	26.0	−0.9
BNP	Carl Donkin	358	14.1	−2.2
Liberal Democrats	Robert Peel	327	12.9	+12.9
Majority		534	21.0	−8.8
Turnout		2,543	30.7	+0.3
Labour hold		Swing		

Shiney Row
Party	Candidate	Votes	%	±%
Labour	Anne Hall	1,571	48.4	−5.8
Conservative	Joyce Wake	900	27.7	+3.5
Liberal Democrats	Carol Attewell	424	13.1	+13.1
BNP	Ian Baillie	350	10.8	+0.7
Majority		671	20.7	−9.3
Turnout		3,245	33.4	+1.7
Labour hold		Swing		

Silksworth
Party	Candidate	Votes	%	±%
Labour	Pat Smith	1,503	49.3	−6.0
Conservative	Patricia Francis	866	28.4	−3.0
BNP	Anthony James	406	13.3	+0.0
Liberal Democrats	Alf Fowler	275	9.0	+9.0
Majority		637	20.9	−3.0
Turnout		3,050	36.7	+1.1
Labour hold		Swing		

Southwick
Party	Candidate	Votes	%	±%
Labour	Rosalind Copeland	1,151	43.5	−1.3
Conservative	Terence Docherty	702	26.5	+6.2
BNP	Alan Brettwood	530	20.0	+2.6
Liberal Democrats	Anne Griffin	263	9.9	−0.5
Majority		449	17.0	−7.5
Turnout		2,646	32.7	−0.2
Labour hold		Swing		

St Annes
Party	Candidate	Votes	%	±%
Labour	Susan Watson	1,089	45.3	−5.1
Conservative	Shaun Cudworth	528	22.0	+4.8
BNP	Julie Potter	415	17.3	+6.1
Liberal Democrats	Simon Dawes	371	15.4	+5.2
Majority		561	23.3	−9.9
Turnout		2,403	29.5	+0.5
Labour hold		Swing		

St Chads
Party	Candidate	Votes	%	±%
Conservative	Alan Wright	1,660	50.3	+3.4
Labour	Darryl Dixon	1,206	36.5	−3.9
BNP	Lynne Hudson	249	7.5	+0.1
Liberal Democrats	Diana Lambton	185	5.6	+5.6
Majority		454	13.8	+7.4
Turnout		3,300	41.7	−0.9
Conservative gain from Labour		Swing		

St Michaels
Party	Candidate	Votes	%	±%
Conservative	Margaret Forbes	2,046	60.2	+0.8
Labour	Lewis Atkinson	797	23.4	−2.1
Liberal Democrats	Les Wascoe	342	10.1	+10.1
BNP	Joanne Cruickshanks	216	6.4	+0.4
Majority		1,249	36.7	+2.8
Turnout		3,401	40.8	+1.5
Conservative hold		Swing		

St Peters
Party	Candidate	Votes	%	±%
Conservative	Lilian Walton	1,501	47.8	+4.0
Labour	Stephen Bonallie	840	26.7	−4.5
Liberal Democrats	Diana Matthew	443	14.1	+0.7
BNP	Derek Wright	358	11.4	+2.5
Majority		661	21.0	+8.4
Turnout		3,142	37.8	+0.1
Conservative hold		Swing		

Washington Central
Party	Candidate	Votes	%	±%
Labour	Dianne Snowdon	1,283	40.3	−8.3
Conservative	Hilary Johnson	833	26.2	+3.0
Liberal Democrats	John Mclelland	741	23.3	+5.6
BNP	Clive Thompson	328	10.3	−0.2
Majority		450	14.1	−11.3
Turnout		3,185	36.3	+0.6
Labour hold		Swing		

Washington East
Party	Candidate	Votes	%	±%
Conservative	Ivan Richardson	1,384	43.2	+3.1
Labour	Neville Padgett	1,291	40.3	+1.0
Liberal Democrats	Malcolm Bannister	401	12.5	−1.7
BNP	Paul Masters	130	4.1	−2.2
Majority		93	2.9	+2.1
Turnout		3,206	37.1	+1.2
Conservative gain from Labour		Swing		

Washington North
Party	Candidate	Votes	%	±%
Labour	John Kelly	1,490	53.0	−5.0
Conservative	Kathleen Irvine	625	22.2	+5.9
Liberal Democrats	Steve Thomas	365	13.0	−3.3
BNP	Lynne Baillie	329	11.7	+2.3
Majority		865	30.8	−10.9
Turnout		2,809	32.3	+1.0
Labour hold		Swing		

Washington South
Party	Candidate	Votes	%	±%
Conservative	Eddie Wake	1,326	42.5	+5.4
Labour	Linda Williams	1,173	37.6	+2.2
Liberal Democrats	David Griffin	390	12.5	−2.9
BNP	Mildred Smart	229	7.3	−0.4
Majority		153	4.9	+3.3
Turnout		3,118	37.5	+2.7
Conservative gain from Labour		Swing		

Washington West
Party	Candidate	Votes	%	±%
Labour	Bernard Scaplehorn	1,392	46.1	−6.8
Conservative	Olwyn Bird	763	25.3	+7.8
Liberal Democrats	Irene Bannister	538	17.8	−0.4
BNP	Doreen Smart	326	10.8	+2.6
Majority		629	20.8	−13.9
Turnout		3,019	33.9	+0.8
Labour hold		Swing		

Preceded by 2007 Sunderland City Council election	Sunderland City Council elections	Succeeded by 2010 Sunderland City Council election
