= 2012 Sunderland City Council election =

2012 UK local government election

| ← 2011 | 3 May 2012 | 2014 → |

One third of 75 seats on Sunderland City Council 38 seats needed for a majority
| | First party | Second party | Third party |
|---|---|---|---|
| Party | Labour | Conservative | Independent |
| Seats before | 56 | 15 | 3 |
| Seats won | 22 | 2 | 2 |
| Seats after | 64 | 8 | 3 |
| Seat change | ▲8 | ▼7 | 0 |
| | Fourth party |
| Party | Liberal Democrats |
| Seats before | 1 |
| Seats won | 0 |
| Seats after | 0 |
| Seat change | ▼1 |
- Map of the 2012 Sunderland City Council election results. Labour in red, Independents in grey and Conservatives in blue.
Majority party before election
Labour
Majority party after election
Labour

The 2012 Sunderland Council election took place on 3 May 2012 to elect members of Sunderland City Council in England. It was held on the same day as other 2012 United Kingdom local elections.

== Election results ==
Following the election, the Labour Party remained in control of the council with its majority increased by eight. Labour took seats from the Conservatives in Washington East, Washington South, St Peter's, St Chad's, Ryhope, Doxford and Barnes. The Liberal Democrats also lost out to Labour in Millfield.

The Conservatives held two wards – Fulwell and St Michael's. Independents in Copt Hill and Houghton also held their seats.

Sunderland Local Election Result 2012
| Party | Seats | Gains | Losses | Net gain/loss | Seats % | Votes % | Votes | +/− |
|---|---|---|---|---|---|---|---|---|
| Labour | 22 | 8 | 0 | ▲8 | 88 | 61.3 | 43,485 | ▲1.6% |
| Conservative | 2 | 0 | 7 | ▼7 | 8 | 19.4 | 14,783 | ▼6.4 |
| Liberal Democrats | 0 | 0 | 1 | ▼1 | 0 | 5.6 | 3,958 | ▲0.2% |
| UKIP | 0 | 0 | 0 | 0 | 0 | 5 | 3,548 | ▲3% |
| Independent | 2 | 0 | 0 | 0 | 8 | 4.8 | 3,376 | ▲0.1% |
| Green | 0 | 0 | 0 | 0 | 0 | 2.3 | 1,620 | ▼0.1% |
| National Front | 0 | 0 | 0 | 0 | 0 | 0.2 | 122 | ▲0.2% |

This resulted in the following composition of the council:

| Party | Previous Council | New Council |
|---|---|---|
| Labour | 56 | 64 |
| Conservatives | 15 | 8 |
| Independent | 3 | 3 |
| Liberal Democrats | 1 | 0 |
| Total | 75 | 75 |
| Working majority | 37 | 53 |

== Ward by ward results ==
An asterisk denotes an incumbent.

=== Barnes ward ===
Barnes
| Party | Candidate | Votes | % | ±% |
|---|---|---|---|---|
| Labour | Rebecca Atkinson | 2,041 | 55.5 | ▲31.1 |
| Conservative | Anthony Morrissey* | 1,486 | 40.4 | ▼11.2 |
| Liberal Democrats | Gouilnara Dixon | 150 | 4.1 | ▼10.7 |
| Majority | | 555 | 15.1 | ▼12.1 |
| Turnout | | 3,692 | 40.8 | ▲2.8 |
| Labour gain from Conservative | | Swing | ▲21.2 | |

=== Castle ward ===
Castle
| Party | Candidate | Votes | % | ±% |
|---|---|---|---|---|
| Labour | Denny Wilson | 1,978 | 86.1 | ▲33.3 |
| Conservative | Paula Wilkinson | 215 | 9.4 | ▼3.8 |
| Liberal Democrats | Paul Hillman | 104 | 4.5 | ▼2.5 |
| Majority | | 1,763 | 76.8 | ▲37.4 |
| Turnout | | 2,319 | 26.7 | ▼3.4 |
| Labour hold | | Swing | ▲18.6 | |

=== Copt Hill ward ===
Copt Hill
| Party | Candidate | Votes | % | ±% |
|---|---|---|---|---|
| Independent | Derrick Smith* | 1,679 | 55.2 | ▲9.6 |
| Labour | Ann Owen | 1,250 | 41.1 | ▲6.7 |
| Liberal Democrats | Sue Sterling | 111 | 3.7 | ▲3.7 |
| Majority | | 429 | 14.1 | ▲2.9 |
| Turnout | | 3,052 | 33.6 | ▼3.2 |
| Independent hold | | Swing | ▲11.7† | |

†Swing to the Independent candidate from the Conservatives, who had stood last time this seat was contested.

=== Doxford ward ===
Doxford
| Party | Candidate | Votes | % | ±% |
|---|---|---|---|---|
| Labour | Christine Marshall | 1,863 | 67.1 | ▲32.1 |
| Conservative | Richard Vardy* | 590 | 21.3 | ▼20.3 |
| Green | Caroline Robinson | 246 | 8.9 | ▲8.9 |
| Liberal Democrats | Matt MacDonald | 76 | 2.7 | ▼10.4 |
| Majority | | 1,273 | 45.9 | ▲39.3 |
| Turnout | | 2,789 | 35.1 | ▼0.6 |
| Labour gain from Conservative | | Swing | ▲26.2 | |

=== Fulwell ward ===
Fulwell
| Party | Candidate | Votes | % | ±% |
|---|---|---|---|---|
| Conservative | Bob Francis* | 1,758 | 48.1 | ▼5 |
| Labour | Margaret Beck | 1,657 | 45.4 | ▲19.1 |
| Liberal Democrats | Geoff Pryke | 238 | 6.5 | ▼5.2 |
| Majority | | 101 | 2.8 | ▼24.1 |
| Turnout | | 3,670 | 40 | ▼3.5 |
| Conservative hold | | Swing | ▼12.1 | |

=== Hendon ward ===
Hendon
| Party | Candidate | Votes | % | ±% |
|---|---|---|---|---|
| Labour Co-op | Michael Mordey* | 1,518 | 66.6 | ▲30.2 |
| Conservative | Debbie Lorraine | 360 | 15.8 | ▼5.8 |
| UKIP | Pauline Featonby-Warren | 244 | 10.7 | ▲10.7 |
| Green | Samuel May | 159 | 7 | ▲7 |
| Majority | | 1,158 | 50.8 | ▲37.6 |
| Turnout | | 2,297 | 25.6 | ▼3.9 |
| Labour Co-op hold | | Swing | ▲17.9 | |

=== Hetton ward ===
Hetton
| Party | Candidate | Votes | % | ±% |
|---|---|---|---|---|
| Labour | James Blackburn* | 1,628 | 51.8 | ▼17.4 |
| UKIP | John Defty | 1,363 | 43.3 | ▲43.3 |
| Liberal Democrats | Philip Dowell | 154 | 4.9 | ▲4.9 |
| Majority | | 265 | 8.4 | ▼30 |
| Turnout | | 3,166 | 35.1 | ▲4.5 |
| Labour hold | | Swing | ▼30.4 | |

=== Houghton ward ===
Houghton
| Party | Candidate | Votes | % | ±% |
|---|---|---|---|---|
| Independent | Sheila Ellis* | 1,697 | 51.9 | ▲7.1 |
| Labour | Gemma Taylor | 1,496 | 45.8 | ▲8.8 |
| Liberal Democrats | Louise Smith | 74 | 2.3 | ▲2.3 |
| Majority | | 201 | 6.2 | ▼1.6 |
| Turnout | | 3,278 | 35.8 | 0 |
| Independent hold | | Swing | ▲9.2† | |

†Swing to the Independent candidate from the Conservatives, who had stood last time this seat was contested.

=== Millfield ward ===
Millfield
| Party | Candidate | Votes | % | ±% |
|---|---|---|---|---|
| Labour Co-op | Bob Price | 1,058 | 45.5 | ▲21.2 |
| Liberal Democrats | Paul Dixon* | 888 | 38.2 | ▼7.9 |
| Conservative | Keith O'Brien | 164 | 7.1 | ▼8 |
| National Front | Paul Birleson | 122 | 5.3 | ▲5.3 |
| Green | Helmut Izaks | 94 | 4 | ▲4 |
| Majority | | 170 | 7.3 | ▼14.5 |
| Turnout | | 2,339 | 28.8 | ▼3.5 |
| Labour Co-op gain from Liberal Democrats | | Swing | ▲14.6 | |

=== Pallion ward ===
Pallion
| Party | Candidate | Votes | % | ±% |
|---|---|---|---|---|
| Labour | Amy Wilson* | 1,541 | 66.7 | ▲22.4 |
| Conservative | Peter O'Connor | 365 | 15.8 | ▼11.3 |
| Green | David Campbell | 304 | 13.2 | ▲13.2 |
| Liberal Democrats | Sylvia Doward | 101 | 4.4 | ▼8.4 |
| Majority | | 1,176 | 50.9 | ▲33.7 |
| Turnout | | 2,321 | 30.4 | ▼1.2 |
| Labour hold | | Swing | ▲16.9 | |

=== Redhill ward ===
Redhill
| Party | Candidate | Votes | % | ±% |
|---|---|---|---|---|
| Labour | Ronny Davison | 1,887 | 78.6 | ▲29.1 |
| UKIP | Lynn Kelly | 388 | 16.2 | ▲16.2 |
| Conservative | Gwennyth Gibson | 125 | 5.2 | ▼5.3 |
| Majority | | 1,499 | 62.46 | ▲32.4 |
| Turnout | | 2,415 | 28 | ▼3 |
| Labour hold | | Swing | ▲24.3† | |

†Swing to Labour from the BNP, who had stood last time this seat was contested.

=== Ryhope ward ===
Ryhope
| Party | Candidate | Votes | % | ±% |
|---|---|---|---|---|
| Labour Co-op | Anthony Farr | 1,887 | 72.8 | ▲40.1 |
| Conservative | Shaun Cudworth | 706 | 27.2 | ▼6.5 |
| Majority | | 1,181 | 45.6 | ▲44.6 |
| Turnout | | 2,620 | 31.9 | ▼5.4 |
| Labour Co-op gain from Conservative | | Swing | ▲23.3 | |

=== St Anne's ward ===
St Anne's
| Party | Candidate | Votes | % | ±% |
|---|---|---|---|---|
| Labour | Susan Watson* | 1,743 | 72.1 | ▲26.7 |
| Conservative | Norman Oliver | 339 | 14 | ▼8 |
| Green | Emily Blyth | 268 | 11.1 | ▲11.1 |
| Liberal Democrats | Kathy Walker | 69 | 2.9 | ▼12.6 |
| Majority | | 1,404 | 58 | ▲34.7 |
| Turnout | | 2,426 | 28 | ▼1.5 |
| Labour hold | | Swing | ▲17.4 | |

=== St Chad's ward ===
St Chad's
| Party | Candidate | Votes | % | ±% |
|---|---|---|---|---|
| Labour | Darryl Dixon | 1,755 | 55.3 | ▲18.8 |
| Conservative | Alan Wright* | 1,312 | 41.4 | ▼8.9 |
| Liberal Democrats | Sue Wilson | 105 | 3.3 | ▼2.3 |
| Majority | | 443 | 14 | ▲0.2 |
| Turnout | | 3,188 | 40 | ▼1.7 |
| Labour gain from Conservative | | Swing | ▲13.9 | |

=== St Michael's ward ===
St Michael's
| Party | Candidate | Votes | % | ±% |
|---|---|---|---|---|
| Conservative | Margaret Forbes* | 1,649 | 51.3 | ▼8.9 |
| Labour | Chris Johnson | 1,161 | 36.1 | ▲12.7 |
| Green | Rachel Featherstone | 265 | 8.2 | ▲8.2 |
| Liberal Democrats | Andrew Wood | 140 | 4.4 | ▼5.7 |
| Majority | | 488 | 15.2 | ▼21.5 |
| Turnout | | 3,242 | 35.4 | ▼5.5 |
| Conservative hold | | Swing | ▼10.8 | |

=== St Peter's ward ===
St Peter's
| Party | Candidate | Votes | % | ±% |
|---|---|---|---|---|
| Labour | Julia Jackson | 1,595 | 52.5 | ▲25.7 |
| Conservative | Graham Hall | 1,221 | 40.2 | ▼7.6 |
| Liberal Democrats | Chris Henry | 224 | 7.4 | ▼6.7 |
| Majority | | 374 | 12.3 | ▼8.7 |
| Turnout | | 3,065 | 35.2 | ▼2.6 |
| Labour gain from Conservative | | Swing | ▲16.7 | |

=== Sandhill ward ===
Sandhill
| Party | Candidate | Votes | % | ±% |
|---|---|---|---|---|
| Labour | Debra Waller | 1,830 | 90.4 | ▲43.4 |
| Labour | Mary Turton | 1,424 | 70.4 | ▲23.3 |
| Conservative | Paul Tweddle | 459 | 22.7 | ▼3.4 |
| Liberal Democrats | Anthony Usher | 335 | 16.6 | ▲3.7 |
| Majority | | 965 | 47.7 | ▲26.7 |
| Turnout | | 2,035 | 23.8 | ▼6.9 |
| Labour hold | | Swing | ▲40 | |
| Labour hold | | Swing | ▲19.9 | |

There was a double vacancy in Sandhill ward in 2012, due to the retirement of Labour councillor Jim Scott, and the death of Labour councillor John Gallagher. Two seats were up for election, and each voter could cast two votes.

=== Shiney Row ward ===
Shiney Row
| Party | Candidate | Votes | % | ±% |
|---|---|---|---|---|
| Labour | Anne Hall* | 2,286 | 73.6 | ▲25.1 |
| Conservative | Malcolm Vardy | 635 | 20.4 | ▼7.3 |
| Liberal Democrats | Carol Attewell | 187 | 6 | ▼7.1 |
| Majority | | 1,651 | 53.1 | ▲32.4 |
| Turnout | | 3,129 | 30.8 | ▼2.6 |
| Labour hold | | Swing | ▲16.2 | |

=== Silksworth ward ===
Silksworth
| Party | Candidate | Votes | % | ±% |
|---|---|---|---|---|
| Labour | Patricia Smith* | 1,960 | 67.2 | ▲18 |
| Conservative | Dominic McDonough | 451 | 15.5 | ▼12.9 |
| UKIP | Derek Horsley | 376 | 12.9 | ▲12.9 |
| Green | Joella Lynch | 128 | 4.4 | ▲4.4 |
| Majority | | 1,509 | 51.8 | ▲30.9 |
| Turnout | | 2,919 | 34.3 | ▼2.4 |
| Labour hold | | Swing | ▲15.5 | |

=== Southwick ward ===
Southwick
| Party | Candidate | Votes | % | ±% |
|---|---|---|---|---|
| Labour | Rosalind Copeland* | 1,582 | 66.4 | ▲22.9 |
| Conservative | Terence Docherty | 394 | 16.5 | ▼10 |
| UKIP | Michael Leadbitter | 325 | 13.6 | ▲13.6 |
| Liberal Democrats | Ann Hollern | 81 | 3.4 | ▲3.4 |
| Majority | | 1,188 | 49.9 | ▲32.9 |
| Turnout | | 2,394 | 28.6 | ▼4.1 |
| Labour hold | | Swing | ▲16.5 | |

=== Washington Central ward ===
Washington Central
| Party | Candidate | Votes | % | ±% |
|---|---|---|---|---|
| Labour Co-op | Dianne Snowdon* | 1,999 | 65.7 | ▲25.5 |
| UKIP | Erland Polden | 536 | 17.6 | ▲17.6 |
| Conservative | Pat Francis | 327 | 10.8 | ▼15.4 |
| Liberal Democrats | Chris Ashford | 179 | 5.9 | ▼17.4 |
| Majority | | 1,463 | 48.1 | ▲34 |
| Turnout | | 3,058 | 33.9 | ▼2.3 |
| Labour Co-op hold | | Swing | ▲20.5 | |

=== Washington East ward ===
Washington East
| Party | Candidate | Votes | % | ±% |
|---|---|---|---|---|
| Labour | David Snowdon | 1,721 | 56.5 | ▲16.2 |
| Conservative | Hilary Johnson | 735 | 24.1 | ▼19.1 |
| UKIP | Linda Hudson | 316 | 10.4 | ▲10.4 |
| Green | Tony Murphy | 156 | 5.1 | ▲5.1 |
| Liberal Democrats | Malcolm Bannister | 119 | 3.9 | ▼8.6 |
| Majority | | 986 | 32.4 | ▲29.5 |
| Turnout | | 3,055 | 34.6 | ▼2.5 |
| Labour gain from Conservative | | Swing | ▲17.7 | |

=== Washington North ward ===
Washington North
| Party | Candidate | Votes | % | ±% |
|---|---|---|---|---|
| Labour | John Kelly* | 2,047 | 80.1 | ▲27 |
| Conservative | Kathleen Irvine | 349 | 13.7 | ▼8.6 |
| Liberal Democrats | Kevin Morris | 160 | 6.3 | ▼6.7 |
| Majority | | 1,698 | 66.4 | ▲35.6 |
| Turnout | | 2,577 | 29 | ▼3.3 |
| Labour hold | | Swing | ▲17.8 | |

=== Washington South ward ===
Washington South
| Party | Candidate | Votes | % | ±% |
|---|---|---|---|---|
| Labour | Louise Farthing | 1,802 | 65.1 | ▲27.5 |
| Conservative | Martin Talbot | 757 | 27.4 | ▼15.2 |
| Liberal Democrats | David Griffin | 209 | 7.6 | ▼5 |
| Majority | | 1,045 | 37.8 | ▲32.9 |
| Turnout | | 2,797 | 33.9 | ▼3.6 |
| Labour gain from Conservative | | Swing | ▲21.4 | |

=== Washington West ward ===
Washington West
| Party | Candidate | Votes | % | ±% |
|---|---|---|---|---|
| Labour | Bernard Scaplehorn* | 2,200 | 77.5 | ▲31.4 |
| Conservative | Olwyn Bird | 386 | 13.6 | ▼11.7 |
| Liberal Democrats | Irene Bannister | 254 | 8.9 | ▼8.9 |
| Majority | | 1,814 | 63.9 | ▲43.1 |
| Turnout | | 2,869 | 31.5 | ▼2.5 |
| Labour hold | | Swing | ▲21.6 | |

| Preceded by 2011 Sunderland City Council election | Sunderland City Council elections | Succeeded by 2014 Sunderland City Council election |
