= 2003 Sunderland City Council election =

2003 UK local government election

← 2002	1 May 2003	2004 →

One third of 75 seats on Sunderland City Council 38 seats needed for a majority
	First party	Second party	Third party
Party	Labour	Conservative	Liberal Democrats
Seats before	62	11	1
Seats won	21	2	0
Seats after	63	9	1
Seat change	▲1	▼2	0
	Fourth party	Fifth party
Party	Independent	Liberal
Seats before	0	1
Seats won	1	1
Seats after	1	1
Seat change	▲1	0
Majority party before election
Labour
Majority party after election
Labour

The 2003 Sunderland Council election took place on 1 May 2003 to elect members of Sunderland Metropolitan Borough Council in Tyne and Wear, England. One third of the council was up for election and the Labour Party stayed in overall control of the council.

== Campaign ==
25 seats were contested in the election by a total of 92 candidates, with the Labour Party, Conservative Party and British National Party contesting every seat. With the British National Party contesting every seat the issue of asylum seekers was important in the election, with the British National Party saying that Sunderland had seen a "palpable invasion of asylum-seekers". However Labour, who were defending 21 of the 25 seats, said that in the previous 2 years only 1,800 had been temporarily housed in the city of a population of 289,000. During the campaign a number of prominent people from the North East including the Bishop of Durham Michael Turnbull and the chairman of Sunderland Football Club Bob Murray issued a statement calling on voters to reject the British National Party.

Labour defended their record pointing to an excellent rating in government league tables, having the second lowest council tax in the north east despite a 7.7% rise and to regeneration projects. They targeted the Conservative wards of Hendon and St Peters, but the Conservatives attacked the management of the council for being bloated and said they could bring more efficiency. Meanwhile, the Liberal Democrats contested 13 seats and said there needed to be more opposition councillors to challenge Labour.

The election in Sunderland saw a trial of all postal voting in an attempt to increase turnout. This helped lead to turnout being over double that seen at the 2002 election at 46%.

== Election result ==
The results saw Labour hold control of the council with 63 seats after gaining 2 seats from the Conservatives who were reduced to 9 seats. One of the 2 gains saw the former leader of council, Bryn Sidaway, win Hendon by 39 votes after a recount, regaining the seat that he had lost in the 1999 election. However Labour did lose 1 seat in Eppleton to an independent Colin Wakefield who had stood to represent a Residents Against Toxic Site campaign.

The British National Party failed to win any seats, but did win 13,652 votes, 13.75% of the total and came second in 5 wards. The failure of the British National Party was partly attributed to the increase in turnout due to the all-postal voting.

Sunderland local election result 2003
Party	Seats	Gains	Losses	Net gain/loss	Seats %	Votes %	Votes	+/−
Labour	21	2	1	▲1	84.0	52.5	52,060	▼4.4%
Conservative	2	0	2	▼2	8.0	22.3	22,089	▼9.6%
BNP	0	0	0	0	0	13.8	13,652	▲10.7%
Liberal Democrats	0	0	0	0	0	7.3	7,265	▼0.6
Independent	1	1	0	▲1	4.0	2.7	2,669	▲2.5%
Liberal	1	0	0	0	0	1.4	1,408	▼1.6
National Front	0	0	0	0	0	0.1	73	▲0.1

This resulted in the following composition of the council:

Party	Previous council	New council
Labour	62	63
Conservatives	11	9
Liberal Democrats	1	1
Liberal	1	1
Independent	0	1
Total	75	75
Working majority	49	51

== Ward by ward results ==
Castletown
Party	Candidate	Votes	%	±%
Labour	Leslie Mann	2,087	64.5	−21.7
BNP	Ian Mcdonald	752	23.2	+23.2
Conservative	Gwennyth Gibson	396	12.2	−1.6
Majority		1,335	41.3	−31.2
Turnout		3,235	43.1	
Labour hold		Swing		

Central
Party	Candidate	Votes	%	±%
Labour	Colin Anderson	1,594	49.0	−10.3
BNP	Christopher Lathan	686	21.1	+21.1
Conservative	Dorreen Storey	487	15.0	−4.6
Liberal Democrats	Jane Walters	487	15.0	−6.1
Majority		908	27.9	−10.4
Turnout		3,254	42.3	
Labour hold		Swing		

Colliery
Party	Candidate	Votes	%	±%
Labour	Norman Dent	1,722	52.4	−9.8
Conservative	John Brown	878	26.7	−11.1
BNP	Ian Leadbitter	685	20.9	+20.9
Majority		844	25.7	+1.4
Turnout		3,285	48.4	
Labour hold		Swing		

Eppleton
Party	Candidate	Votes	%	±%
Independent	Colin Wakefield	1,839	39.6	+39.6
Labour	Robert Heron	1,788	38.5	−28.5
Conservative	David Wilson	464	10.0	−23.0
Liberal Democrats	Philip Dowell	330	7.1	+7.1
BNP	James Davison	225	4.8	+4.8
Majority		51	1.1	
Turnout		4,646	48.9	
Independent gain from Labour		Swing		

Fulwell
Party	Candidate	Votes	%	±%
Conservative	John Walton	2,506	53.8	−12.7
Labour	Rosalind Copeland	1,313	28.2	+6.5
BNP	Joseph Dobbie	431	9.3	+4.0
Liberal Democrats	Amie Leung	406	8.7	+2.2
Majority		1,193	25.6	−19.2
Turnout		4,656	56.8	
Conservative hold		Swing		

Grindon
Party	Candidate	Votes	%	±%
Labour	David Forbes	1,885	62.3	−4.7
Conservative	David Andrew	627	20.7	−12.3
BNP	Paul Humble	515	17.0	+17.0
Majority		1,258	41.6	+7.7
Turnout		3,027	43.2	
Labour hold		Swing		

Hendon
Party	Candidate	Votes	%	±%
Labour	Brynley Sidaway	1,711	42.8	−2.2
Conservative	Paul Maddison	1,672	41.8	+0.9
BNP	David Guynan	619	15.5	+1.5
Majority		39	1.0	−3.1
Turnout		4,002	51.5	
Labour gain from Conservative		Swing		

Hetton
Party	Candidate	Votes	%	±%
Labour	Florence Anderson	2,807	72.9	−2.2
Conservative	Olwyn Bird	624	16.2	−8.7
BNP	Andrew Morris	419	10.9	+10.9
Majority		2,183	56.7	+6.6
Turnout		3,850	43.9	
Labour hold		Swing		

Houghton
Party	Candidate	Votes	%	±%
Labour	Louise Farthing	2,461	70.1	−10.2
Conservative	Gordon Newton	571	16.3	−3.4
BNP	Ian Patterson	480	13.7	+13.7
Majority		1,890	53.8	−6.7
Turnout		3,512	43.9	
Labour hold		Swing		

Pallion
Party	Candidate	Votes	%	±%
Labour	Robert Pells	1,695	38.3	−6.1
Conservative	Stephen Daughton	1,581	35.8	−4.1
BNP	David Martin	556	12.6	+12.6
Liberal Democrats	Sham Vedhara	410	9.3	−1.8
Independent	Ronald Smith	178	4.0	−0.7
Majority		114	2.6	−1.9
Turnout		4,420	53.5	
Labour gain from Conservative		Swing		

Ryhope
Party	Candidate	Votes	%	±%
Labour	Aileen Handy	2,657	54.5	−15.3
Liberal Democrats	Martyn Herron	798	16.4	+16.4
Conservative	William Dunn	730	15.0	−15.2
BNP	Michael Matthews	691	14.2	+14.2
Majority		1,859	38.1	−1.5
Turnout		4,876	45.9	
Labour hold		Swing		

St Chad's
Party	Candidate	Votes	%	±%
Labour	John Porthouse	2,090	50.2	−8.0
Conservative	Lee Martin	1,224	29.4	−12.4
Liberal Democrats	Elizabeth Foreman	437	10.5	+10.5
BNP	Carol Dobbie	415	10.0	+10.0
Majority		866	20.8	+4.4
Turnout		4,166	51.9	
Labour hold		Swing		

St Michael's
Party	Candidate	Votes	%	±%
Conservative	Peter Wood	2,727	56.7	−10.2
Labour	David Errington	1,551	32.2	−0.9
BNP	Stephen Bilton	534	11.1	+11.1
Majority		1,176	24.4	−9.5
Turnout		4,812	55.8	
Conservative hold		Swing		

St Peter's
Party	Candidate	Votes	%	±%
Labour	Christine Shattock	1,481	34.0	−1.8
Conservative	Lilian Walton	1,362	31.3	−8.1
Liberal Democrats	John Lennox	841	19.3	−5.4
BNP	Jason Dent	674	15.5	+15.5
Majority		119	2.7	
Turnout		4,358	54.1	
Labour hold		Swing		

Shiney Row
Party	Candidate	Votes	%	±%
Labour	Anne Hall	3,060	60.8	−11.7
Liberal Democrats	Neil Grundy	878	17.4	+17.4
Conservative	John Calvert	621	12.3	−15.2
BNP	Sharon Leadbitter	474	9.4	+9.4
Majority		2,182	43.4	−1.7
Turnout		5,033	45.2	
Labour hold		Swing		

Silksworth
Party	Candidate	Votes	%	±%
Labour	Patricia Smith	2,760	65.7	−6.5
Conservative	Patricia Francis	646	15.4	−6.1
BNP	Trevor Jenkins	575	13.7	+7.4
Independent	Georgina Kennedy	221	5.3	+5.3
Majority		2,114	50.3	−0.4
Turnout		4,202	44.3	
Labour hold		Swing		

South Hylton
Party	Candidate	Votes	%	±%
Labour	Susan Watson	1,927	61.7	−6.7
BNP	Debra Hiles	674	21.6	+21.6
Conservative	Kathryn Chamberlin	520	16.7	−14.9
Majority		1,253	40.1	+3.3
Turnout		3,121	43.0	
Labour hold		Swing		

Southwick
Party	Candidate	Votes	%	±%
Labour	Bryan Charlton	1,519	53.1	−9.8
BNP	Alan Brettwood	510	17.8	−1.9
Independent	Frederick Crone	431	15.1	+15.1
Liberal Democrats	Christine Griffin	217	7.6	−3.7
Conservative	Alice Mclaren	183	6.4	+0.2
Majority		1,009	35.3	−7.9
Turnout		2,860	45.7	
Labour hold		Swing		

Thorney Close
Party	Candidate	Votes	%	±%
Labour	David Allan	1,983	63.7	−3.4
BNP	Joseph Dobbie	680	21.8	+6.2
Conservative	Paula Wilkinson	450	14.5	−2.8
Majority		1,303	41.9	−8.0
Turnout		3,113	42.6	
Labour hold		Swing		

Thornholme
Party	Candidate	Votes	%	±%
Liberal	Winifred Lundgren	1,408	42.9	−13.7
Labour	Phillip Gibson	919	28.0	−2.2
Conservative	Marjorie Matthews	499	15.2	+2.0
BNP	Philip Clark	453	13.8	+13.8
Majority		489	14.9	−11.5
Turnout		3,279	45.5	
Liberal hold		Swing		

Town End Farm
Party	Candidate	Votes	%	±%
Labour	Gowan Scott	1,760	59.4	−1.7
BNP	John Martin	878	29.7	+1.7
Conservative	Gillian Connor	323	10.9	+0.0
Majority		882	29.8	−3.3
Turnout		2,961	45.1	
Labour hold		Swing		

Washington East
Party	Candidate	Votes	%	±%
Labour	Eric Timmins	3,003	61.0	−1.1
Conservative	Jacqueline Atkinson	822	16.7	−6.1
Liberal Democrats	Avril Kitching	650	13.2	−1.9
BNP	David Richardson	371	7.5	+7.5
National Front	Mark Farrell	73	1.5	+1.5
Majority		2,181	44.3	+5.0
Turnout		4,919	44.2	
Labour hold		Swing		

Washington North
Party	Candidate	Votes	%	±%
Labour	John Murray	2,703	74.0	−5.5
Conservative	Kathleen Irvine	528	14.5	−6.0
BNP	Ian Guilbert	422	11.6	+11.6
Majority		2,175	59.5	+0.5
Turnout		3,653	42.2	
Labour hold		Swing		

Washington South
Party	Candidate	Votes	%	±%
Labour	Bryan Williams	3,152	52.4	+2.6
Liberal Democrats	Owen Dumpleton	1,169	19.4	+1.9
Conservative	Michael Dixon	1,112	18.5	−14.2
BNP	Gordon Pace	586	9.7	+9.7
Majority		1,983	32.9	+15.8
Turnout		6,019	42.4	
Labour hold		Swing		

Washington West
Party	Candidate	Votes	%	±%
Labour	William Craddock	2,432	61.5	−4.3
Liberal Democrats	David Griffin	642	16.2	−1.4
Conservative	Justin Garrod	536	13.5	−3.0
BNP	Keith Byrne	347	8.8	+8.8
Majority		1,790	45.2	−3.0
Turnout		3,957	42.8	
Labour hold		Swing		

Preceded by 2002 Sunderland City Council election	Sunderland City Council elections	Succeeded by 2004 Sunderland City Council election
