= 2011 Sunderland City Council election =

2011 UK local government election

← 2010	5 May 2011	2012 →

One third of 75 seats on Sunderland City Council 38 seats needed for a majority
	First party	Second party	Third party
Party	Labour	Conservative	Independent
Seats before	52	18	4
Seats won	21	3	1
Seats after	56	14	4
Seat change	▲4	▼4	0
	Fourth party
Party	Liberal Democrats
Seats before	1
Seats won	0
Seats after	1
Seat change	0
- Map of the 2011 Sunderland City Council election results. Labour in red, Independents in grey and Conservatives in blue.
Majority party before election
Labour
Majority party after election
Labour

The 2011 Sunderland Council election took place on 5 May 2011 to elect members of Sunderland Metropolitan Borough Council in Tyne and Wear, England. One third of the council was up for election and the Labour Party stayed in overall control of the council.

== Campaign ==
Before the election Labour ran the council with 52 seats, compared to 18 Conservatives, 1 Liberal Democrat and 4 independents, with 1 of the 4 independents being described as an "Independent Conservative". 26 seats were being contested in the election with 2 seats being available in Sandhill ward, after councillor Jim Scott stood down from the council.

Labour were hopeful of making gains due to a backlash against the national Conservative led government and rising unemployment. However the Conservatives hoped the national council tax freeze and pension increases would help the party do well and blamed the previous Labour government for the economic situation. Meanwhile, the Liberal Democrats said they would focus on local issues and targeted Millfield ward.

Other candidates included 7 from the Green Party and 3 from the United Kingdom Independence Party. However the British National Party did not put up any candidates, after contesting every seat in some previous elections.

== Election results ==
The results saw Labour increase their majority on the council after gaining 4 seats from the Conservatives to have 56 councillors. The gains came in the wards of St Chad's, St Peter's, Washington East and Washington South and left the Conservatives with 14 seats. The Liberal Democrats had a bad election, coming fourth in many seats, after a drop in their share of the vote. Meanwhile, independent Colin Wakefield held his seat in Copt Hill by 428 votes over Labour. Neither the Green Party or the United Kingdom Independence Party won any seats, but the Greens came third in 6 of the 7 seats they had contested and the United Kingdom Independence Party came second in Hetton. Overall turnout in the election was 35.1%.

Sunderland kept up its position as a quick counter of results, with the first result in Pallion being declared at 10.53pm, after the polls had closed at 10pm. The council was also the first to finish counting with the final results being declared at 1am. The Labour leader of the council Paul Watson held the seat in Pallion and put Labour's success down to the cuts being made by the national government and as an endorsement of the city council. The Conservative group leader Paul Morrissey meanwhile said his party had suffered due to being in government nationally.

Sunderland local election result 2011
Party	Seats	Gains	Losses	Net gain/loss	Seats %	Votes %	Votes	+/−
Labour	22	4	0	▲4	84.6	60.3	49,898	▲11.3%
Conservative	3	0	4	▼4	11.5	25.7	21,303	▲0.5%
Liberal Democrats	0	0	0	0	0	5.1	4,185	▼13.2%
Independent	1	0	0	0	3.8	4.6	3,782	▲0.6%
Green	0	0	0	0	0	2.4	1,979	▲2.1%
UKIP	0	0	0	0	0	2.0	1,654	▲2.0%

This resulted in the following composition of the council:

Party	Previous Council	New Council
Labour	52	56
Conservatives	18	14
Independent	4	4
Liberal Democrats	1	1
Total	75	75
Working majority	29	37

== Ward by ward results ==
Barnes
Party	Candidate	Votes	%	±%
Conservative	Lee Martin	1,989	49.1	+13.1
Labour	Rebecca Atkinson	1,896	46.8	+5.6
Liberal Democrats	Anthony Usher	170	4.2	−13.9
Majority		93	2.3	
Turnout		4,055	45.7	−16.9
Conservative hold		Swing		

Castle
Party	Candidate	Votes	%	±%
Labour	Stephen Foster	2,202	84.6	+33.3
Conservative	Geoff Scott	294	11.3	+0.7
Liberal Democrats	Paul Hillman	108	4.1	−7.8
Majority		1,908	73.3	+40.3
Turnout		2,604	30.4	−19.6
Labour hold		Swing		

Copt Hill
Party	Candidate	Votes	%	±%
Independent	Colin Wakefield	1,961	56.1	+14.3
Labour	Juliana Heron	1,533	43.9	−1.1
Majority		428	12.2	
Turnout		3,494	39.6	−15.6
Independent hold		Swing		

Doxford
Party	Candidate	Votes	%	±%
Labour	David Errington	1,906	59.7	+7.7
Conservative	Hilary Johnson	946	29.6	−0.2
Green	Caroline Robinson	296	9.3	+9.3
Liberal Democrats	Matt MacDonald	46	1.4	−16.9
Majority		960	30.1	+7.9
Turnout		3,194	40.5	−20.2
Labour hold		Swing		

Fulwell
Party	Candidate	Votes	%	±%
Conservative	John Wiper	1,992	47.3	+2.1
Labour	Paul Middleton	1,799	42.7	+7.0
Liberal Democrats	Geoffrey Pryke	423	10.0	−9.2
Majority		193	4.6	−4.9
Turnout		4,214	46.5	−21.9
Conservative hold		Swing		

Hendon
Party	Candidate	Votes	%	±%
Labour	Thomas Martin	1,781	68.1	+15.4
Conservative	Debbie Lorraine	535	20.4	−6.1
Green	Sam May	301	11.5	+11.5
Majority		1,246	47.6	+21.4
Turnout		2,617	29.9	−14.8
Labour hold		Swing		

Hetton
Party	Candidate	Votes	%	±%
Labour	Florence Anderson	1,940	58.8	+2.7
UKIP	John Defty	956	29.0	+29.0
Conservative	Pat Francis	239	7.2	−5.9
Liberal Democrats	Philip Dowell	167	5.1	−16.9
Majority		984	29.8	−4.3
Turnout		3,302	37.6	−12.8
Labour hold		Swing		

Houghton
Party	Candidate	Votes	%	±%
Labour	Kath Rolph	1,820	52.3	+5.2
Independent	John Ellis	1,660	47.7	+11.8
Majority		160	4.6	−6.7
Turnout		3,480	38.6	−16.1
Labour hold		Swing		

Millfield
Party	Candidate	Votes	%	±%
Labour	Lynda Scanlan	1,363	53.8	+15.2
Liberal Democrats	Paul Edgeworth	585	23.1	−12.0
Conservative	Vijaya Das	289	11.4	−5.0
Independent	Rod MacPherson	161	6.4	+2.6
Green	Jack McGlen	134	5.3	+5.3
Majority		778	30.7	+27.2
Turnout		2,532	33.1	−14.9
Labour hold		Swing		

Pallion
Party	Candidate	Votes	%	±%
Labour	Paul Watson	1,688	63.8	+12.4
Conservative	Peter O'Connor	506	19.1	−1.2
Green	David Campbell	451	17.1	+17.1
Majority		1,182	44.7	+13.7
Turnout		2,645	35.1	−13.6
Labour hold		Swing		

Redhill
Party	Candidate	Votes	%	±%
Labour	Richard Bell	2,104	87.6	+18.1
Conservative	Martin Anderson	299	12.4	−5.4
Majority		1,805	75.1	+23.4
Turnout		2,403	29.9	−15.3
Labour hold		Swing		

Ryhope
Party	Candidate	Votes	%	±%
Labour	Ellen Ball	2,022	64.2	+1.5
Conservative	Shaun Cudworth	1,129	35.8	−1.5
Majority		893	28.3	+2.9
Turnout		3,151	39.0	−19.1
Labour hold		Swing		

St Annes
Party	Candidate	Votes	%	±%
Labour	Lisa Smiles	1,908	71.4	+12.6
Conservative	Paula Wilkinson	436	16.3	−0.7
Green	Emily Blyth	238	8.9	+5.0
Liberal Democrats	Kathy Walker	90	3.4	−16.9
Majority		1,472	55.1	+16.6
Turnout		2,672	31.2	−15.1
Labour hold		Swing		

St Chads
Party	Candidate	Votes	%	±%
Labour	Stuart Porthouse	1,851	52.9	+12.6
Conservative	Michael Dixon	1,647	47.1	−0.1
Majority		204	5.8	
Turnout		3,498	44.6	−14.3
Labour gain from Conservative		Swing		

St Michaels
Party	Candidate	Votes	%	±%
Conservative	Peter Wood	1,962	50.8	+8.4
Labour	David Owens	1,364	35.3	+3.0
Green	John Appleton	285	7.4	+4.2
Liberal Democrats	Andrew Wood	248	6.4	−12.0
Majority		598	15.5	+5.4
Turnout		3,859	42.8	−21.4
Conservative hold		Swing		

St Peters
Party	Candidate	Votes	%	±%
Labour	Barry Curran	1,755	49.6	+12.4
Conservative	Graham Hall	1,521	43.0	+7.2
Liberal Democrats	Diana Matthew	259	7.3	−12.8
Majority		234	6.6	+5.2
Turnout		3,535	41.7	−18.7
Labour gain from Conservative		Swing		

Sandhill (2)
Party	Candidate	Votes	%	±%
Labour	John Gallagher	1,783		
Labour	Debra Waller	1,637		
Conservative	Paul Tweddle	456		
Conservative	Juliette Muca	440		
Liberal Democrats	Susan Wilson	241		
Turnout		4,557	33.7	−12.8
Labour hold		Swing		
Labour hold		Swing		

Shiney Row
Party	Candidate	Votes	%	±%
Labour	John Scott	2,423	64.9	+10.6
Conservative	Malcolm Vardy	1,035	27.7	+1.8
Liberal Democrats	Carol Attewell	278	7.4	−12.4
Majority		1,388	37.2	+8.8
Turnout		3,736	37.5	−18.6
Labour hold		Swing		

Silksworth
Party	Candidate	Votes	%	±%
Labour	Peter Gibson	2,227	66.7	+9.0
Conservative	Dominic McDonough	709	21.2	−2.5
Green	Joella Lynch	274	8.2	+8.2
Liberal Democrats	Andy Bex	130	3.9	−14.7
Majority		1,518	45.4	+11.4
Turnout		3,340	39.6	−17.1
Labour hold		Swing		

Southwick
Party	Candidate	Votes	%	±%
Labour	Christine Shattock	1,930	69.7	+15.6
Conservative	Terence Docherty	691	24.9	+3.3
Liberal Democrats	Anne Griffin	149	5.4	−10.1
Majority		1,239	44.7	+12.3
Turnout		2,770	33.8	−14.9
Labour hold		Swing		

Washington Central
Party	Candidate	Votes	%	±%
Labour	Len Lauchlan	2,240	61.9	+8.8
Conservative	Tracy Young	706	19.5	−4.3
UKIP	Erland Polden	443	12.2	+12.2
Liberal Democrats	John McLelland	230	6.4	−16.7
Majority		1,534	42.4	+13.1
Turnout		3,619	40.5	−19.7
Labour hold		Swing		

Washington East
Party	Candidate	Votes	%	±%
Labour	Fiona Miller	1,935	53.9	+8.9
Conservative	Ian Cuthbert	1,201	33.4	+1.6
UKIP	Linda Hudson	255	7.1	+7.1
Liberal Democrats	Malcolm Bannister	201	5.6	−13.1
Majority		734	20.4	+7.2
Turnout		3,592	40.9	−19.8
Labour gain from Conservative		Swing		

Washington North
Party	Candidate	Votes	%	±%
Labour	Peter Walker	2,253	76.3	+19.1
Conservative	Joyce Wake	469	15.9	+1.8
Liberal Democrats	Kevin Morris	232	7.9	−11.8
Majority		1,784	60.4	+22.9
Turnout		2,954	34.0	−17.2
Labour hold		Swing		

Washington South
Party	Candidate	Votes	%	±%
Labour	George Thompson	2,126	60.5	+19.1
Conservative	Martin Talbot	1,102	31.3	−0.5
Liberal Democrats	David Griffin	288	8.2	−18.6
Majority		1,024	29.1	+19.5
Turnout		3,516	43.0	−17.7
Labour gain from Conservative		Swing		

Washington West
Party	Candidate	Votes	%	±%
Labour	Harry Trueman	2,412	69.7	+20.3
Conservative	Olwyn Bird	710	20.5	+1.0
Liberal Democrats	Irene Bannister	340	9.8	−15.2
Majority		1,702	49.2	+24.9
Turnout		3,462	38.3	−20.1
Labour hold		Swing		

Preceded by 2010 Sunderland City Council election	Sunderland City Council elections	Succeeded by 2012 Sunderland City Council election
