= 2015 Sunderland City Council election =

2015 UK local government election

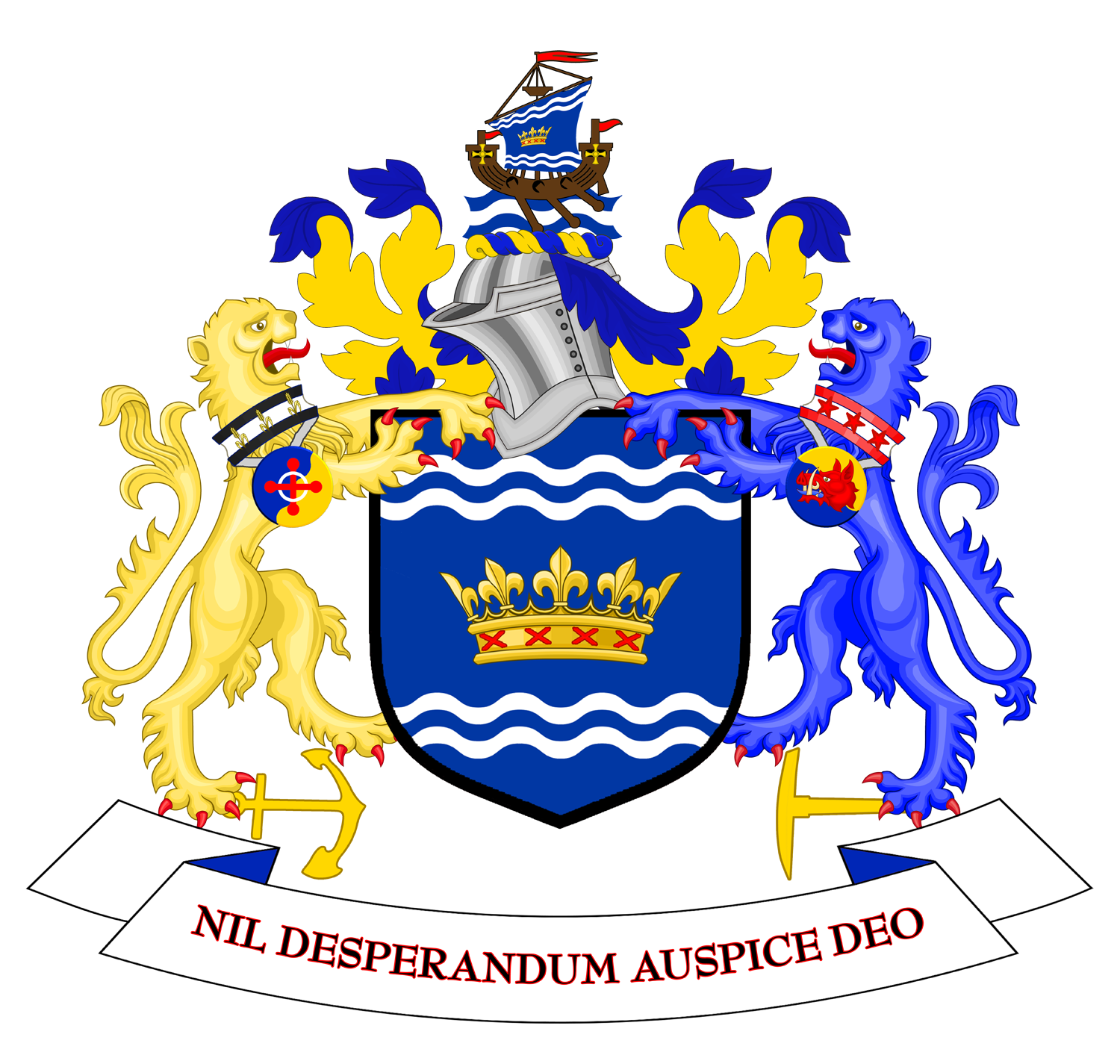
- 7 May 2015

One third of 75 seats on Sunderland City Council 38 seats needed for a majority
	First party	Second party	Third party
Party	Labour	Conservative	Independent
Seats before	63	8	4
Seats won	24	1	0
Seats after	66	6	3
Seat change	▲3	▼2	▼1
- Map of the 2015 Sunderland City Council election results. Labour in red and Conservatives in blue.
Majority party before election
Labour
Majority party after election
Labour

The 2015 Sunderland City Council election took place on 7 May 2015 to elect members of Sunderland City Council in England. This was on the same day as other local elections, and the 2015 general election.

== Background ==
There had been one by-election held in the period since the previous local elections in 2014 which saw Labour hold the Washington East ward in November 2014 following the resignation of their incumbent councillor in October.

== Election results ==
The election saw Labour gain three seats, increasing the party's majority on the Council. Labour gained from the Conservatives in Barnes and Fulwell, and from an independent, Colin Wakefield, in Houghton.

Sunderland local election result 2015
Party	Seats	Gains	Losses	Net gain/loss	Seats %	Votes %	Votes	+/−
Labour	24	3	0	▲3	96	49.6	57,544	▲3.3
Conservative	1	0	0	▼2	4	20.8	24,079	▲1.4
UKIP	0	0	0	0	0	19.5	22,580	▼4.8
Green	0	0	0	0	0	3.5	4,089	▲1.7
Liberal Democrats	0	0	0	0	0	3.1	3,617	▼0.6
Independent	0	0	1	▼1	0	3.1	3,582	▼0.6
TUSC	0	0	0	0	0	0.4	448	▼0.2
North East	0	0	0	0	0	0.1	101	▲0.1

After the election, the composition of the council was:

Party	Previous council	New council
Labour	63	66
Conservatives	8	6
Independent	4	3
Total	75	75
Working majority	51	57

== Ward by ward results ==
Asterisk denotes incumbent councillor.

=== Barnes Ward ===
Barnes Ward
Party	Candidate	Votes	%	±%
Labour	Ian Galbraith	2,336	43.7	▼3.1
Conservative	Peter O'Connor	1,580	29.6	▼19.5
UKIP	J Nast	889	16.6	▲16.6
Liberal Democrats	Laura Bruton	302	5.7	▲1.5
Green	Lucky Pemu	219	4.1	▲4.1
Rejected ballots		18	0.3	
Majority		756	14.1	▲11.8
Turnout		5,344	61.2	▲15.5
Registered electors		8,732		
Labour gain from Conservative		Swing		

=== Castle Ward ===
Castle Ward
Party	Candidate	Votes	%	±%
Conservative	Martin Anderson			
TUSC	Gary Duncan			
Labour	Stephen Foster			
UKIP	Keith Samme			
Majority				
Turnout				

=== Copt Hill Ward ===
Copt Hill Ward
Party	Candidate	Votes	%	±%
Conservative	Pat Francis			
Green	Daniel Olaman			
Labour	Mary Turton			
Independent	Colin Wakefield			
Majority				
Turnout				

=== Doxford Ward ===
Doxford Ward
Party	Candidate	Votes	%	±%
Conservative	Alex Douglas			
Labour	Colin English			
Green	Alan Robinson			
UKIP	Kay Rowham			
Majority				
Turnout				

=== Fulwell Ward ===
Fulwell Ward
Party	Candidate	Votes	%	±%
Labour	Margaret Beck			
UKIP	Sheila Samme			
Liberal Democrats	Diana Talbott-Matthew			
Conservative	John Wiper			
Majority				
Turnout				

=== Hendon Ward ===
Hendon Ward
Party	Candidate	Votes	%	±%
UKIP	Pauline Featonby-Warren			
Green	David Lawson			
Conservative	Deborah Lorraine			
Labour Co-op	Victoria O'Neil			
TUSC	Owen Taylor			
Majority				
Turnout				

=== Hetton Ward ===
Hetton Ward
Party	Candidate	Votes	%	±%
UKIP	John Defty			
Liberal Democrats	Philip Dowell			
Conservative	Douglas Middlemiss			
Labour	Doris Turner			
Majority				
Turnout				

=== Houghton Ward ===
Houghton Ward
Party	Candidate	Votes	%	±%
Conservative	George Brown			
Independent	John Ellis			
UKIP	Terrence Henderson			
Labour	Juliana Heron			
Liberal Democrats	David Snowball			
Majority				
Turnout				

=== Millfield Ward ===
Millfield Ward
Party	Candidate	Votes	%	±%
UKIP	David Geddis			
Conservative	Gwennyth Gibson			
Green	Helmut Izaks			
Liberal Democrats	Stephen O'Brien			
Labour Co-op	Lynda Scanlan			
TUSC	Karen Sinclair			
Majority				
Turnout				

=== Pallion Ward ===
Pallion Ward
Party	Candidate	Votes	%	±%
Liberal Democrats	Sylvia Dorward			
Green	Rachel Featherstone			
UKIP	Ian Pallace			
Labour Co-op	Paul Watson			
Conservative	Philip Young			
Majority				
Turnout				

=== Redhill Ward ===
Redhill Ward
Party	Candidate	Votes	%	±%
Labour Co-op	Richard Bell			
Conservative	Shaun Cudworth			
North East	Heather Fagan			
UKIP	Lynn Kelly			
Liberal Democrats	Steve Thomas			
Majority				
Turnout				

=== Ryhope Ward ===
Ryhope Ward
Party	Candidate	Votes	%	±%
Labour Co-op	Ellen Ball			
Green	Paul Burwood			
UKIP	Bryan Foster			
Conservative	Harry Todd			
Majority				
Turnout				

=== St Anne's Ward ===
St Anne's Ward
Party	Candidate	Votes	%	±%
UKIP	Aileen Casey			
Conservative	Tony Morrissey			
Green	Caroline Robinson			
Liberal Democrats	Anthony Usher			
Labour	Karen Waters			
Majority				
Turnout				

=== St Chad's Ward ===
St Chad's Ward
Party	Candidate	Votes	%	±%
Liberal Democrats	Margaret Crosby	171		
Conservative	Dominic McDonough	1462		
Labour	John Porthouse	2046		
Green	Gavin Taylor	143		
UKIP	Linda Welsh	773		
Majority		584		
Turnout				

=== St Michael's Ward ===
St Michael's Ward
Party	Candidate	Votes	%	±%
Green	Tim Brennan			
UKIP	Vince Costello			
Labour	Zaf Iqbal			
Liberal Democrats	Andrew Wood			
Conservative	Peter Wood			
Majority				
Turnout				

=== St Peter's Ward ===
St Peter's Ward
Party	Candidate	Votes	%	±%
TUSC	Douglas Beavers			
Labour	Barry Curran			
Liberal Democrats	John Lennox			
UKIP	Ronald McQuillan			
Green	Saied Satei			
Conservative	Geoffrey Scott			
Majority				
Turnout				

=== Sandhill Ward ===
Sandhill Ward
Party	Candidate	Votes	%	±%
Labour	Jacqui Gallagher			
UKIP	Tony Morrow			
Conservative	Christine Reed			
Liberal Democrats	Susan Wilson			
Majority				
Turnout				

=== Shiney Row Ward ===
Shiney Row Ward
Party	Candidate	Votes	%	±%
Green	Rebecca Cowell			
UKIP	Richard Elvin			
Conservative	Sally Oliver			
Liberal Democrats	Jo Thomas			
Labour	Geoffrey Walker			
Majority				
Turnout				

=== Silksworth Ward ===
Silksworth Ward
Party	Candidate	Votes	%	±%
Green	Chris Crozier			
UKIP	William Davies			
Labour	Peter Gibson			
Conservative	Bryan Reynolds			
Majority				
Turnout				

=== Southwick Ward ===
Southwick Ward
Party	Candidate	Votes	%	±%
Green	Kate Dowell			
Labour	Miles Elliott			
Conservative	Michael Leadbitter			
Liberal Democrats	Callum Littlemore			
UKIP	Alexander Taylor			
Majority				
Turnout				

=== Washington Central Ward ===
Washington Central Ward
Party	Candidate	Votes	%	±%
Liberal Democrats	Anne Griffin			
Labour	Len Lauchlan			
Green	Paul Leonard			
Conservative	Marjorie Matthews			
UKIP	Erland Polden			
Majority				
Turnout				

=== Washington East Ward ===
Washington East Ward
Party	Candidate	Votes	%	±%
Liberal Democrats	Malcolm Bannister			
Conservative	Hilary Johnson			
TUSC	Wilf Laws			
Labour Co-op	Fiona Miller			
Green	Anthony Murphy			
UKIP	Lynn O'Neil			
Majority				
Turnout				

=== Washington North Ward ===
Washington North Ward
Party	Candidate	Votes	%	±%
Green	June Bradley			
Liberal Democrats	Kevin Morris			
Conservative	Norman Oliver			
UKIP	Tony Ormond			
Labour	Peter Walker			
Majority				
Turnout				

=== Washington South Ward ===
Washington South Ward
Party	Candidate	Votes	%	±%
Green	Dominic Armstrong			
UKIP	Alistair Baxter			
Liberal Democrats	David Griffin			
Labour	Paul Middleton			
Conservative	Martin Talbot			
Majority				
Turnout				

=== Washington West Ward ===
Washington West Ward
Party	Candidate	Votes	%	±%
Liberal Democrats	Irene Bannister			
Conservative	Olwyn Bird			
Green	Ben Rathbone-Wells			
UKIP	Kevin Sheppard			
Labour	Harry Trueman			
Majority				
Turnout				

Preceded by 2014 Sunderland City Council election	Sunderland City Council elections	Succeeded by 2016 Sunderland City Council election
