= 2007 Sunderland City Council election =

2007 UK local government election

- 3 May 2007

One third of 75 seats on Sunderland City Council 38 seats needed for a majority
	First party	Second party	Third party
Party	Labour	Conservative	Independent
Seats before	58	13	3
Seats won	17	7	1
Seats after	54	16	4
Seat change	▼4	▲3	▲1
	Fourth party
Party	Liberal Democrats
Seats before	1
Seats won	0
Seats after	1
Seat change	1
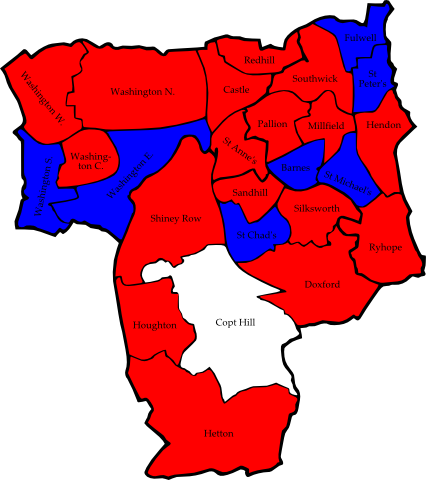
- Map of the 2007 Sunderland City Council election results. Labour in red, Conservatives in blue, and Independents in white.
Majority party before election
Labour
Majority party after election
Labour

The 2007 Sunderland Council election took place on 3 May 2007 to elect members of Sunderland Metropolitan Borough Council in Tyne and Wear, England. One third of the council was up for election and the Labour Party stayed in overall control of the council.

== Background ==
Before the election the council had 57 Labour, 13 Conservative, 4 independent and 1 Liberal Democrat councillors. In the period since the previous local elections in May 2006, three councillors had left their parties to sit as Independents: Peter Maddison leaving the Liberal Democrat Group in July 2006, and Bryn Sidaway (Hendon) and George Blyth (Doxford) leaving the Labour Group in November 2006. Blyth's ward colleague Mike Tansey had previously left the Labour Group to sit as an Independent in November 2005, and stood for re-election as an Independent candidate in this election.

25 seats were contested in the 2007 elections with a total of 111 candidates standing. These included a full 25 each from the Labour, Conservative and British National Party, as well as 16 independents, 15 Liberal Democrats, 2 Respect, 2 British First Party and 1 from the United Kingdom Independence Party.

As at the 2006 election this election saw Sunderland have three polling stations open for 10 days before election day in an attempt to make voting more convenient for voters.

== Election results ==
The results had Labour stay in control of the council but with a smaller majority. The Conservatives gained 3 seats from Labour in St Chads, Washington East and Washington South to hold 16 seats compared to 54 for Labour. The 2 Conservative gains in Washington were the first time the party had won seats in the town since it became part of Sunderland council. Labour also lost one seat to an independent in Copt Hill, but regained another in Doxford where the sitting independent councillor, Mike Tansey, had originally been elected for the Labour Party. This meant there remained 4 Independents on the council, as well as 1 Liberal Democrat who was not defending a seat in the election. Overall turnout in the election was 34%, up on 32% at the 2006 election.

Sunderland local election result 2007
Party	Seats	Gains	Losses	Net gain/loss	Seats %	Votes %	Votes	+/−
Labour	17	0	4	▼4	68	43.3	31,148	▲2.8%
Conservative	7	3	0	▲3	28	28.1	20,223	▼0.3%
Independent	1	1	0	▲1	4	8.3	5,992	▲7.6%
BNP	0	0	0	0	0	10.6	7,653	▼4.0%
Liberal Democrats	0	0	0	0	0	8.7	6,293	▼7.0%
British First Party	0	0	0	0	0	0.5	335	▲0.5%
Respect	0	0	0	0	0	0.3	224	▲0.3%
UKIP	0	0	0	0	0	0.1	72	▲0.1%

This resulted in the following composition of the council:

Party	Previous Council	New Council
Labour	58	54
Conservatives	13	16
Independent	3	4
Liberal Democrats	1	1
Total	75	75
Working majority	41	33

== Ward by ward results ==
=== Barnes ward ===
Barnes
Party	Candidate	Votes	%	±%
Conservative	Lee Martin	1,767	53.7	+7.1
Labour	Helmut Izaks	747	22.7	−0.9
Liberal Democrats	Robert Boyce	492	14.9	−4.8
BNP	John McCaffrey	287	8.7	−1.4
Majority		1,020	31.0	+8.0
Turnout		3,293	37.7	+0.4
Conservative hold		Swing		

=== Castle ward ===
Castle
Party	Candidate	Votes	%	±%
Labour	Denny Wilson	1,675	66.0	+16.3
BNP	Ian McDonald	395	15.6	−5.7
Independent	Ronald McQuillan	276	10.9	−7.7
Conservative	Martin Anderson	191	7.5	−3.0
Majority		1,280	50.5	+22.1
Turnout		2,537	30.0	+1.6
Labour hold		Swing		

=== Copt Hill ward ===
Copt Hill
Party	Candidate	Votes	%	±%
Independent	Colin Wakefield	1,382	42.9	+42.9
Labour	Juliana Heron	1,146	35.6	−15.1
Conservative	Richard Vardy	358	11.1	−22.1
BNP	Michael Webb	176	5.5	−10.7
Liberal Democrats	Margaret Gibbons	159	4.9	+4.9
Majority		236	7.3	
Turnout		3,221	36.0	+6.2
Independent gain from Labour		Swing		

=== Doxford ward ===
Doxford
Party	Candidate	Votes	%	±%
Labour	David Errington	1,041	35.8	−3.3
Independent	Mike Tansey†	924	31.8	+31.8
Conservative	Alistair Newton	701	24.1	−5.0
BNP	Lesley Dathan	243	8.4	−6.6
Majority		117	4.0	−6.0
Turnout		2,909	36.2	+3.7
Labour hold		Swing		

†Mike Tansey had been elected in 2004 as a Labour candidate, but subsequently left the party to sit as an Independent councillor. The result was technically a hold for Labour although Tansey, the incumbent, lost his seat.

=== Fulwell ward ===
Fulwell
Party	Candidate	Votes	%	±%
Conservative	John Walton	2,077	53.9	+1.7
Labour	Bob Price	968	25.1	−0.4
Liberal Democrats	Geofrey Pryke	507	13.1	+1.1
BNP	Joseph Dobbie	304	7.9	−2.4
Majority		1,109	28.8	+2.2
Turnout		3,856	42.7	+0.0
Conservative hold		Swing		

=== Hendon ward ===
Hendon
Party	Candidate	Votes	%	±%
Labour	Thomas Martin	1,045	43.0	+1.1
Independent	Sammy Doran	453	18.6	+18.6
Conservative	Deborah Lorraine	442	18.2	−2.6
BNP	David Guynan	362	14.9	−6.2
Respect	Tafazzal Hussain	129	5.3	+5.3
Majority		592	24.4	+3.6
Turnout		2,431	30.2	−1.2
Labour hold		Swing		

=== Hetton ward ===
Hetton
Party	Candidate	Votes	%	±%
Labour	Florence Anderson	1,506	55.3	−1.5
Liberal Democrats	Philip Dowell	489	17.9	+17.9
BNP	John Richardson	402	14.8	−7.8
Conservative	George Brown	328	12.0	−8.6
Majority		1,017	37.3	+3.2
Turnout		2,725	31.3	+3.9
Labour hold		Swing		

=== Houghton ward ===
Houghton
Party	Candidate	Votes	%	±%
Labour	Kath Rolph	1,496	50.7	+0.1
Independent	John Finn	544	18.4	+18.4
Conservative	Douglas Middlemiss	338	11.5	−5.0
Liberal Democrats	Avril Snowball	326	11.1	−7.3
BNP	Peter Swain	246	8.3	−6.2
Majority		952	32.3	+0.0
Turnout		2,950	33.8	+4.2
Labour hold		Swing		

=== Millfield ward ===
Millfield
Party	Candidate	Votes	%	±%
Labour	Kevin O'Connor	754	32.9	+1.3
Liberal Democrats	Jim Major	698	30.5	−10.5
Conservative	Gwennyth Gibson	306	13.4	−1.6
BNP	Christopher Lathan	198	8.7	−3.7
Independent	Rachel Moore	166	7.3	+7.3
Respect	Keith Adshead	95	4.2	+4.2
UKIP	Pauline Featonby-Warren	72	3.1	+3.1
Majority		56	2.4	
Turnout		2,289	31.8	+2.6
Labour hold		Swing		

=== Pallion ward ===
Pallion
Party	Candidate	Votes	%	±%
Labour	Paul Watson	1,061	44.7	+1.2
Conservative	Michael Leadbitter	445	18.7	+0.5
Independent	Fred Dove	314	13.2	+13.2
BNP	James Davison	279	11.7	−7.2
Liberal Democrats	Ann Hollern	277	11.7	−7.7
Majority		616	25.9	+1.9
Turnout		2,376	30.5	+0.8
Labour hold		Swing		

=== Redhill ward ===
Redhill
Party	Candidate	Votes	%	±%
Labour	Richard Bell	1,426	56.1	+5.0
BNP	Ian Leadbitter	585	23.0	−3.8
Conservative	Paula Wilkinson	275	10.8	+0.4
Independent	Lesley Dixon	176	6.9	+6.9
British First Party	Julie Potter	78	3.1	+3.1
Majority		841	33.1	+8.7
Turnout		2,540	29.9	+0.2
Labour hold		Swing		

=== Ryhope ward ===
Ryhope
Party	Candidate	Votes	%	±%
Labour	Ellen Ball	1,194	41.3	+0.1
Conservative	Christopher Fairs	872	30.2	+1.9
Independent	Patrick Lavelle	443	15.3	+15.3
BNP	Frederick Donkin	383	13.2	−2.7
Majority		322	11.1	−1.8
Turnout		2,892	36.1	+3.5
Labour hold		Swing		

=== Sandhill ward ===
Sandhill
Party	Candidate	Votes	%	±%
Labour	David Forbes	1,420	56.8	+14.1
Conservative	Gordon Newton	674	26.9	+3.1
BNP	Joseph Dobbie	408	16.3	+0.9
Majority		746	29.8	+11.0
Turnout		2,502	30.4	+1.4
Labour hold		Swing		

=== Shiney Row ward ===
Shiney Row
Party	Candidate	Votes	%	±%
Labour	John Scott	1,656	54.2	+4.2
Conservative	Eddie Wake	740	24.2	+5.5
Independent	George Parkin	353	11.5	+11.5
BNP	Sharon Leadbitter	309	10.1	−2.7
Majority		916	30.0	−1.3
Turnout		3,058	31.7	+1.2
Labour hold		Swing		

=== Silksworth ward ===
Silksworth
Party	Candidate	Votes	%	±%
Labour	Peter Gibson	1,637	55.3	+9.7
Conservative	Patricia Francis	929	31.4	+8.0
BNP	Anthony James	395	13.3	−1.4
Majority		708	23.9	+1.7
Turnout		2,961	35.6	+0.7
Labour hold		Swing		

=== Southwick ward ===
Southwick
Party	Candidate	Votes	%	±%
Labour	Christine Shattock	1,193	44.8	+2.7
Conservative	Terence Docherty	541	20.3	−1.0
BNP	Alan Brettwood	463	17.4	−3.7
Liberal Democrats	Anne Griffin	278	10.4	−5.1
Independent	Stephen Hanratty	190	7.1	+7.1
Majority		652	24.5	+3.6
Turnout		2,665	32.9	+2.1
Labour hold		Swing		

=== St Anne's ward ===
St Anne's
Party	Candidate	Votes	%	±%
Labour	Sylvia Old	1,172	50.4	+4.9
Conservative	Marjorie Matthews	399	17.2	−3.3
BNP	Deborah Boyd	260	11.2	−5.7
British First Party	John Martin	257	11.0	+11.0
Liberal Democrats	Leslie Wascoe	238	10.2	−6.9
Majority		773	33.2	+8.2
Turnout		2,326	29.0	+1.3
Labour hold		Swing		

=== St Chad's ward ===
St Chad's
Party	Candidate	Votes	%	±%
Conservative	Michael Dixon	1,563	46.9	−7.1
Labour	Stuart Porthouse	1,348	40.4	+8.9
BNP	Carol Dobbie	248	7.4	−0.3
Independent	Chain Gill	175	5.2	+5.2
Majority		215	6.4	−16.1
Turnout		3,334	42.6	+1.6
Conservative gain from Labour		Swing		

=== St Michael's ward ===
St Michael's
Party	Candidate	Votes	%	±%
Conservative	Peter Wood	1,928	59.4	+6.3
Labour	Michael Mordey	827	25.5	+5.3
Independent	Martin Quinn	293	9.0	+9.0
BNP	Ian Sayers	196	6.0	−4.1
Majority		1,101	33.9	+1.0
Turnout		3,244	39.3	+0.8
Conservative hold		Swing		

=== St Peter's ward ===
St Peter's
Party	Candidate	Votes	%	±%
Conservative	Graham Hall	1,361	43.8	+2.3
Labour	Linda Mitchell	968	31.2	+0.7
Liberal Democrats	Diana Matthew	417	13.4	−1.7
BNP	Derek Wright	275	8.9	−4.0
Independent	Robbie Menzies	86	2.8	+2.8
Majority		393	12.6	+1.6
Turnout		3,107	37.7	−0.4
Conservative hold		Swing		

=== Washington Central ward ===
Washington Central
Party	Candidate	Votes	%	±%
Labour	Eric Timmins	1,522	48.6	+4.5
Conservative	Jackie Atkinson	727	23.2	+3.1
Liberal Democrats	David Snowball	556	17.7	−4.0
BNP	Clive Thompson	329	10.5	−3.6
Majority		795	25.4	+3.0
Turnout		3,134	35.7	+3.3
Labour hold		Swing		

=== Washington East ward ===
Washington East
Party	Candidate	Votes	%	±%
Conservative	Ian Cuthbert	1,245	40.1	+5.2
Labour	Bryan Williams	1,220	39.3	+1.0
Liberal Democrats	Malcolm Bannister	441	14.2	−2.7
BNP	David Laing	195	6.3	−3.6
Majority		25	0.8	
Turnout		3,101	35.9	+2.7
Conservative gain from Labour		Swing		

=== Washington North ward ===
Washington North
Party	Candidate	Votes	%	±%
Labour	Peter Walker	1,567	58.0	+3.2
Liberal Democrats	Paul Hillman	441	16.3	−2.3
Conservative	Kathleen Irvine	441	16.3	+1.9
BNP	Lynne Hudson	254	9.4	−2.8
Majority		1,126	41.7	+5.5
Turnout		2,703	31.3	+3.2
Labour hold		Swing		

=== Washington South ward ===
Washington South
Party	Candidate	Votes	%	±%
Conservative	Kathryn Chamberlin	1,066	37.1	+7.6
Labour	Louise Farthing	1,019	35.4	+4.5
Liberal Democrats	David Griffin	444	15.4	−12.9
BNP	William Ramshaw	222	7.7	−3.7
Independent	Walter Scott	124	4.3	+4.3
Majority		47	1.6	
Turnout		2,875	34.8	+3.9
Conservative gain from Labour		Swing		

=== Washington West ward ===
Washington West
Party	Candidate	Votes	%	±%
Labour	Harry Trueman	1,540	52.9	+1.5
Liberal Democrats	Irene Bannister	530	18.2	−3.2
Conservative	Olwyn Bird	509	17.5	+1.0
BNP	Jason Dent	239	8.2	−2.5
Independent	Ian Snowball	93	3.2	+3.2
Majority		1,010	34.7	+4.7
Turnout		2,911	33.1	+2.6
Labour hold		Swing		

Preceded by 2006 Sunderland City Council election	Sunderland City Council elections	Succeeded by 2008 Sunderland City Council election
