= 2010 Sunderland City Council election =

Sunderland City Council election

← 2008	6 May 2010	2011 →

One third of 75 seats on Sunderland City Council 38 seats needed for a majority
	First party	Second party	Third party
Party	Labour	Conservative	Independent
Seats before	48	21	5
Seats won	22	3	0
Seats after	52	18	4
Seat change	▲4	▼3	▼1
	Fourth party
Party	Liberal Democrats
Seats before	1
Seats won	0
Seats after	1
Seat change	0
- Map of the 2010 Sunderland City Council election results. Labour in red and Conservatives in blue.
Majority party before election
Labour
Majority party after election
Labour

The 2010 Sunderland Council election took place on 6 May 2010 to elect members of Sunderland Metropolitan Borough Council in Tyne and Wear, England. One third of the council was up for election and the Labour Party stayed in overall control of the council. The election took place on the same day as the 2010 General Election.

== Campaign ==
Before the election Sunderland council had 48 Labour, 21 Conservative, 1 Liberal Democrat and 5 Independent councillors. The Independents were made up of 4 in an alliance and 1, Eddie Wake, described as an "Independent Conservative" having been suspended from the Conservative Party in the period since the last local elections in May 2008.

In total 89 candidates stood for the 25 seats being contested, with a full 25 from the Labour Party, 23 Conservatives, 23 Liberal Democrats, 12 British National Party, 2 Green Party and 4 Independents. This was a substantial decline in candidates for the British National Party, which in previous years had contested every ward. The 2 seats not contested by the Conservative party in Copt Hill and Houghton were where Independent candidates had been successful in previous years, with the Conservative party leader on the council Lee Martin saying the party would not have been able to win the seats. The seats were again contested by Independents campaigning against the Houghton Quarry landfill site.

Labour were confident of making gains, pointing to the lowest council tax in the North East and efforts to improve schools and address unemployment. However the Conservatives were also looking to make gains and particularly targeted seats they had previously won in Doxford, Ryhope and Washington South.

== Election results ==
The results saw the Labour Party increase their majority on the council after gaining 4 seats to hold 52 of the 75 seats. Labour held every seat they had been defending, while gaining seats from the Conservatives in Barnes, St Peter's and Washington East, and taking Millfield from an Independent, Peter Maddison. Peter Maddison, who was deputy leader of the Independent group, came last in Millfield with 133 votes and independents also failed to take Copt Hill and Houghton. Meanwhile, the Liberal Democrats failed to win any seats, but did see an increase in votes for the party. Overall turnout was 55.02%, compared to 34.9% at the 2008 election, with the highest turnout in Fulwell at 68%.

The Conservative leader on the council Lee Martin put his parties failure down to a higher turnout due to the election taking place at the same time as the general election and a higher than usual vote share for the Liberal Democrats. Following the election Lee Martin resigned as leader of the Conservative group and was succeeded by Tony Morrissey.

Sunderland local election result 2010
Party	Seats	Gains	Losses	Net gain/loss	Seats %	Votes %	Votes	+/−
Labour	22	4	0	▲4	88.0	49.0	57,058	▲9.4
Conservative	3	0	3	▼3	12.0	25.2	29,358	▼6.8
Liberal Democrats	0	0	0	0	0.0	18.3	21,290	▲6.7
Independent	0	0	1	▼1	0.0	4.0	4,621	▼2.4
BNP	0	0	0	0	0.0	3.3	3,886	▼6.9
Green	0	0	0	0	0.0	0.3	325	▲0.3

This resulted in the following composition of the council:

Party	Previous Council	New Council
Labour	48	52
Conservatives	21	18
Independent	5	4
Liberal Democrats	1	1
Total	75	75
Working majority	21	29

== Ward by ward results ==
=== Barnes ward ===
Barnes
Party	Candidate	Votes	%	±%
Labour	Michael Essl	2,280	41.2	+16.8
Conservative	Angela Barkess	1,991	36.0	−15.6
Liberal Democrats	Gouilnara Dixon	1,001	18.1	+3.4
BNP	Ethan Maggiore	265	4.8	−4.5
Majority		289	5.2	
Turnout		5,537	62.6	+24.6
Labour gain from Conservative		Swing		

=== Castle ward ===
Castle
Party	Candidate	Votes	%	±%
Labour	Doris MacKnight	2,173	51.3	−1.5
Independent	Tony Clarke	774	18.3	+8.2
Liberal Democrats	Jon Dewart	505	11.9	+4.9
Conservative	Geoffrey Scott	449	10.6	−2.6
BNP	Ian McDonald	338	8.0	−5.4
Majority		1,399	33.0	−6.4
Turnout		4,239	50.0	+19.5
Labour hold		Swing		

=== Copt Hill ward ===
Copt Hill
Party	Candidate	Votes	%	±%
Labour	Bob Heron	2,174	45.0	+10.5
Independent	Paul Marriner	1,971	40.8	−4.8
Liberal Democrats	Louise Powell	687	14.2	+14.2
Majority		203	4.2	
Turnout		4,832	55.2	+18.5
Labour hold		Swing		

=== Doxford ward ===
Doxford
Party	Candidate	Votes	%	±%
Labour	Betty Gibson	2,463	52.0	+17.0
Conservative	John Wiper	1,411	29.8	−11.8
Liberal Democrats	David Sullivan	867	18.3	+5.2
Majority		1,052	22.2	
Turnout		4,741	60.7	+25.0
Labour hold		Swing		

=== Fulwell ward ===
Fulwell
Party	Candidate	Votes	%	±%
Conservative	George Howe	2,797	45.2	−8.0
Labour	Barry Curran	2,208	35.7	+9.5
Liberal Democrats	Geoffrey Pryke	1,186	19.2	+7.5
Majority		589	9.5	−17.4
Turnout		6,191	68.4	+24.9
Conservative hold		Swing		

=== Hendon ward ===
Hendon
Party	Candidate	Votes	%	±%
Labour	Barbara McClennan	1,976	52.7	+16.3
Conservative	Sammy Doran	994	26.5	+5.0
Liberal Democrats	Nathan Hazlett	779	20.8	+11.7
Majority		982	26.2	+13.0
Turnout		3,749	44.7	+15.2
Labour hold		Swing		

=== Hetton ward ===
Hetton
Party	Candidate	Votes	%	±%
Labour	David Tate	2,465	56.1	−13.1
Liberal Democrats	Philip Dowell	966	22.0	+22.0
Conservative	Paula Wilkinson	575	13.1	−17.7
BNP	John Richardson	389	8.9	+8.9
Majority		1,499	34.1	−4.3
Turnout		4,395	50.4	+19.8
Labour hold		Swing		

=== Houghton ward ===
Houghton
Party	Candidate	Votes	%	±%
Labour	Dennis Richardson	2,290	47.1	+10.1
Independent	John Ellis	1,743	35.9	−8.9
Liberal Democrats	David Snowball	824	17.0	+17.0
Majority		547	11.3	
Turnout		4,857	54.7	+18.9
Labour hold		Swing		

=== Millfield ward ===
Millfield
Party	Candidate	Votes	%	±%
Labour	Iain Kay	1,363	38.6	+14.3
Liberal Democrats	Jim Major	1,241	35.1	−10.9
Conservative	Vijaya Das	580	16.4	+1.4
BNP	Edward McFarlane	217	6.1	−1.7
Independent	Peter Maddison†	133	3.8	+0.1
Majority		122	3.5	
Turnout		3,534	48.0	+15.7
Labour gain from Liberal Democrats		Swing		

†Peter Maddison had been elected in 2006 as a Liberal Democrat candidate, but subsequently left the party to sit as an Independent councillor. As such, this win for Labour was technically a gain from the Liberal Democrats.

=== Pallion ward ===
Pallion
Party	Candidate	Votes	%	±%
Labour	Cecilia Gofton	1,866	51.4	+7.1
Conservative	Peter O'Connor	739	20.3	−6.8
Liberal Democrats	Amanda Robinson	709	19.5	+6.7
BNP	Lynne Hudson	318	8.8	−7.0
Majority		1,127	31.0	+13.8
Turnout		3,632	48.7	+17.1
Labour hold		Swing		

=== Redhill ward ===
Redhill
Party	Candidate	Votes	%	±%
Labour	Paul Stewart	2,669	69.5	+20.0
Conservative	Martin Anderson	684	17.8	+7.3
BNP	Terence Woolford	490	12.8	−6.7
Majority		1,985	51.7	+21.6
Turnout		3,843	45.2	+14.2
Labour hold		Swing		

=== Ryhope ward ===
Ryhope
Party	Candidate	Votes	%	±%
Labour	Alan Emerson	2,904	62.7	+30.0
Conservative	Shaun Cudworth	1,727	37.3	+3.6
Majority		1,177	25.4	
Turnout		4,631	58.1	+21.8
Labour hold		Swing		

=== Sandhill ward ===
Sandhill
Party	Candidate	Votes	%	±%
Labour	David Allan	2,197	57.6	+10.6
Conservative	Paul Tweddle	842	22.1	−3.9
Liberal Democrats	Robert Peel	778	20.4	+7.5
Majority		1,355	35.5	+14.5
Turnout		3,817	46.5	+15.8
Labour hold		Swing		

=== Shiney Row ward ===
Shiney Row
Party	Candidate	Votes	%	±%
Labour	Mel Speding	2,974	54.3	+5.9
Conservative	Malcolm Vardy	1,420	25.9	−1.8
Liberal Democrats	Carol Attewell	1,083	19.8	+6.7
Majority		1,554	28.4	+7.7
Turnout		5,477	56.1	+22.7
Labour hold		Swing		

=== Silksworth ward ===
Silksworth
Party	Candidate	Votes	%	±%
Labour	Philip Tye	2,740	57.7	+8.4
Conservative	Dominic McDonough	1,126	23.7	−4.7
Liberal Democrats	Andy Bex	881	18.6	+9.6
Majority		1,614	34.0	+13.1
Turnout		4,747	56.7	+20.0
Labour hold		Swing		

=== Southwick ward ===
Southwick
Party	Candidate	Votes	%	±%
Labour	Norma Wright	2,145	54.1	+10.6
Conservative	Terry Docherty	858	21.6	−4.9
Liberal Democrats	Anne Griffin	615	15.5	+5.6
BNP	John McCaffrey	350	8.8	−11.2
Majority		1,287	32.4	+15.4
Turnout		3,968	48.7	+16.0
Labour hold		Swing		

=== St Anne's ward ===
St Annes
Party	Candidate	Votes	%	±%
Labour	Thomas Wright	2,263	58.8	+13.5
Liberal Democrats	Simon Dawes	781	20.3	+4.9
Conservative	Neil Robinson	656	17.0	−5.0
Green	Emily Blyth	151	3.9	+3.9
Majority		1,482	38.5	+15.2
Turnout		3,851	46.3	+16.8
Labour hold		Swing		

=== St Chad's ward ===
St Chads
Party	Candidate	Votes	%	±%
Conservative	Robert Oliver	2,165	47.2	−3.1
Labour	Darryl Dixon	1,848	40.3	+3.8
Liberal Democrats	Sus Wilson	572	12.5	+6.9
Majority		317	6.9	−6.9
Turnout		4,585	58.9	+17.2
Conservative hold		Swing		

=== St Michael's ward ===
St Michaels
Party	Candidate	Votes	%	±%
Conservative	Paul Maddison	2,328	42.4	−17.8
Labour	Juliana Heron	1,773	32.3	+8.9
Liberal Democrats	Paul Edgeworth	1,013	18.4	+8.3
BNP	Paul Anderson	206	3.7	−2.7
Green	John Lowther	174	3.2	+3.2
Majority		555	10.1	−26.6
Turnout		5,494	64.2	+23.4
Conservative hold		Swing		

=== St Peter's ward ===
St Peters
Party	Candidate	Votes	%	±%
Labour	Stephen Bonallie	1,917	37.2	+10.5
Conservative	Shirley Leadbitter	1,843	35.8	−12.0
Liberal Democrats	Diana Matthew	1,038	20.1	+6.0
BNP	Derek Wright	357	6.9	−4.5
Majority		74	1.4	
Turnout		5,155	60.4	+22.6
Labour gain from Conservative		Swing		

=== Washington Central ward ===
Washington Central
Party	Candidate	Votes	%	±%
Labour	Linda Williams	2,799	53.1	+12.8
Conservative	Tina Richardson	1,256	23.8	−2.4
Liberal Democrats	John Mclelland	1,220	23.1	−0.2
Majority		1,543	29.3	+15.2
Turnout		5,275	60.2	+23.9
Labour hold		Swing		

=== Washington East ward ===
Washington East
Party	Candidate	Votes	%	±%
Labour	Neville Padgett	2,378	45.0	+4.7
Conservative	Hilary Johnson	1,681	31.8	−11.4
Liberal Democrats	Malcolm Bannister	990	18.7	+6.2
BNP	Linda Birtwell	240	4.5	+0.4
Majority		697	13.2	
Turnout		5,289	60.7	+23.6
Labour gain from Conservative		Swing		

=== Washington North ward ===
Washington North
Party	Candidate	Votes	%	±%
Labour	Jill Fletcher	2,537	57.2	+4.2
Liberal Democrats	Steve Thomas	875	19.7	+6.7
Conservative	Tracy Young	624	14.1	−8.1
BNP	James Reed	396	8.9	−2.8
Majority		1,662	37.5	+6.7
Turnout		4,432	51.2	+18.9
Labour hold		Swing		

=== Washington South ward ===
Washington South
Party	Candidate	Votes	%	±%
Labour	Graeme Miller	2,062	41.4	+3.8
Conservative	Joyce Wake	1,586	31.8	−10.7
Liberal Democrats	David Griffin	1,333	26.8	+14.3
Majority		476	9.6	
Turnout		4,981	60.7	+23.2
Labour hold		Swing		

=== Washington West ward ===
Washington West
Party	Candidate	Votes	%	±%
Labour	Dorothy Trueman	2,594	49.4	+3.3
Liberal Democrats	Irene Bannister	1,316	25.0	+7.2
Conservative	Olwyn Bird	1,026	19.5	−5.8
BNP	Rian Birtwell	320	6.1	−4.7
Majority		1,278	24.3	+3.5
Turnout		5,256	58.4	+24.5
Labour hold		Swing		

Preceded by 2008 Sunderland City Council election	Sunderland City Council elections	Succeeded by 2011 Sunderland City Council election
