= 2004 Sunderland City Council election =

2004 UK local government election

- 10 June 2004

All 75 seats on Sunderland City Council 38 seats needed for a majority
	First party	Second party	Third party
Party	Labour	Conservative	Liberal Democrats
Seats before	63	9	1
Seats won	61	12	2
Seats after	61	12	2
Seat change	▼2	▲3	▲1
	Fourth party	Fifth party
Party	Independent	Liberal
Seats before	1	1
Seats won	0	0
Seats after	0	0
Seat change	▼1	▼1
- Map of the 2004 Sunderland City Council election results. Labour in red, Conservatives in blue, and Liberal Democrats in yellow.
Majority party before election
Labour
Majority party after election
Labour

The 2004 Sunderland City Council election took place on 10 June 2004 to elect members of Sunderland City Council Council in Tyne and Wear, England. The whole council was up for election following boundary changes since the last election in 2003. The Labour Party stayed in overall control of the council.

== Campaign ==
Every seat was contested in the election for the first time since 1982. Labour held a big majority before the election with 63 seats, but almost a quarter of Labour's councillors stood down at the election. Labour was the only party to field a full 75 candidates, while the next largest number of candidates was from the Conservative Party who fielded 54 candidates. Candidates in the election also included 25 from the British National Party after the party failed to win any seats in the 2003 election but came second in 6 wards.

Labour described their record in control of the council as being positive and that they were making progress, but the Conservatives described Labour as being "arrogant and remote". The Conservatives targeted wards in the town of Washington as well as Millfield, St Chad's and St Peters, while Barnes ward was seen as being a three-way battle between Labour, Conservatives and Liberal Democrats.

At the election count anti-Nazi demonstrators had a scuffle with British National Party supporters when the candidates entered the building, with one British National Party candidate being arrested on suspicion of assault.

== Election result ==
The results saw Labour hold control of the council with a large majority, but the Conservatives made some gains in Barnes, Fulwell and St Michael's. This meant Labour ended with 61 seats, while the Conservatives were up three on 12 seats. The Liberal Democrats took two seats, while the British National Party failed to win any seats. Overall turnout was 40.26%, down on the 47.47% in 2003 but up on the 22% at the 2002 election before all postal voting was used.

Sunderland local election result 2004
Party	Seats	Gains	Losses	Net gain/loss	Seats %	Votes %	Votes	+/−
Labour	61	1	3	▼2	81.3	55.4	103,550	▲2.9
Conservative	12	3	0	▲3	16.0	28.9	54,119	▲6.6
Liberal Democrats	2	2	0	▲1	2.7	8.0	14,886	▼0.7
BNP	0	0	0	0	0.0	6.6	12,398	▼7.2
Independent	0	0	1	▼1	0.0	0.9	1,638	▼1.8
Liberal	0	0	1	▼1	0.0	0.2	429	▲0.2

This resulted in the following composition of the council:

Party	Previous council	New council
Labour	63	61
Conservatives	9	12
Liberal Democrats	1	2
Liberal	1	0
Independent	1	0
Total	75	75
Working majority	51	47

== Ward by ward results ==
Barnes (3)
Party	Candidate	Votes	%	±%
Conservative	Stephen Daughton	1,557		
Conservative	Lee Martin	1,495		
Conservative	Michael Arnott	1,427		
Liberal Democrats	Mark Greenfield	1,296		
Labour	Ian Galbraith	1,171		
Liberal Democrats	Emma Pryke	1,016		
Labour	Anne Morrison	1,011		
Labour	Iain Key	938		
Liberal Democrats	Peter Taylor	884		
BNP	Paul Humble	427		
Turnout		11,222	48.5	

Castle (3)
Party	Candidate	Votes	%	±%
Labour	Thomas Foster	1,655		
Labour	Leslie Mann	1,543		
Labour	Robert Symonds	1,449		
BNP	Ian McDonald	687		
Conservative	Gillian Connor	513		
Conservative	Alice Mclaren	443		
Turnout		6,290	36.3	

Copt Hill (3)
Party	Candidate	Votes	%	±%
Labour	Joan Carthy	1,805		
Labour	Juliana Heron	1,642		
Labour	Robert Heron	1,551		
Conservative	Jane Wilson	1,161		
BNP	Anthony James	508		
Turnout		6,667	37.2	

Doxford (3)
Party	Candidate	Votes	%	±%
Labour	George Blyth	1,543		
Labour	Michael Tansey	1,494		
Labour	Elizabeth Gibson	1,463		
Conservative	Peter Elliot-West	918		
Conservative	George Brown	909		
Conservative	Stephen Sinclair	843		
BNP	Debra Hiles	496		
Turnout		7,666	38.9	

Fulwell (3)
Party	Candidate	Votes	%	±%
Conservative	Norman Bohill	2,978		
Conservative	John Walton	2,394		
Conservative	George Howe	2,263		
Labour	Rosalind Copeland	884		
Labour	Norman Dent	864		
Labour	Gordon Higgins	819		
Liberal Democrats	Bill Ryder	665		
BNP	Joseph Dobbie	417		
Turnout		11,284	51.7	

Hendon (3)
Party	Candidate	Votes	%	±%
Labour	Brynley Sidaway	1,142		
Labour	Thomas Martin	1,123		
Labour	Mary Smith	1,015		
Conservative	Janice Morrissey	647		
Conservative	John Cowley	627		
Liberal Democrats	Jane Walters	578		
Conservative	Malcolm Vickers	507		
BNP	David Guynan	504		
Liberal Democrats	Tafazzal Hussain	456		
Liberal	Winifred Lundgren	429		
Turnout		7,028	36.0	

Hetton (3)
Party	Candidate	Votes	%	±%
Labour	James Blackburn	1,670		
Labour	Florence Anderson	1,663		
Labour	Richard Tate	1,413		
Liberal Democrats	Philip Dowell	920		
Conservative	Christopher Galley	676		
BNP	John Richardson	442		
Turnout		6,784	37.2	

Houghton (3)
Party	Candidate	Votes	%	±%
Labour	Joseph Lawson	2,054		
Labour	Kathryn Rolph	1,944		
Labour	Dennis Richardson	1,864		
Conservative	William Lewis	783		
BNP	Louise Smith	518		
Turnout		7,163	38.3	

Millfield (3)
Party	Candidate	Votes	%	±%
Liberal Democrats	James Hollern	893		
Labour	Colin Anderson	846		
Labour	Keith Adshead	824		
Labour	Louise Farthing	728		
Liberal Democrats	John Jackson	629		
Conservative	Michael Dixon	579		
Conservative	Patricia Francis	570		
Liberal Democrats	Sham Vedhara	557		
Conservative	Gordon Newton	530		
BNP	Jason Dent	360		
Turnout		6,516	35.9	

Pallion (3)
Party	Candidate	Votes	%	±%
Labour	Amy Wilson	1,350		
Labour	Paul Watson	1,333		
Labour	Robert Kirby	1,148		
Conservative	Gwennyth Gibson	802		
Conservative	Dorreen Storey	754		
BNP	James Davison	647		
Turnout		6,034	36.0	

Redhill (3)
Party	Candidate	Votes	%	±%
Labour	Bryan Charlton	1,804		
Labour	Richard Bell	1,594		
Labour	Paul Stewart	1,521		
BNP	Ian Leadbitter	716		
Conservative	Terence Docherty	499		
Conservative	James McIntosh	441		
Turnout		6,575	36.5	

Ryhope (3)
Party	Candidate	Votes	%	±%
Labour	Ronald Bainbridge	1,433		
Labour	Aileen Handy	1,268		
Labour	David Wares	1,218		
Conservative	Audrey Casson	859		
BNP	William Brown	585		
Conservative	Tariq Al-Dulaymi	549		
Turnout		5,912	37.6	

Sandhill (3)
Party	Candidate	Votes	%	±%
Labour	James Scott	1,515		
Labour	David Forbes	1,411		
Labour	David Allan	1,238		
Conservative	Ronald Drayton	894		
BNP	Christopher Lathan	530		
Turnout		5,588	36.7	

Shiney Row (3)
Party	Candidate	Votes	%	±%
Labour	Anne Hall	1,817		
Labour	John Scott	1,491		
Labour	Melville Speding	1,417		
Liberal Democrats	Neil Grundy	994		
Liberal Democrats	Paul Forster	846		
Conservative	Douglas Middlemiss	664		
Conservative	Kathleen Cowe	582		
BNP	Sharon Leadbitter	423		
Turnout		8,234	38.8	

Silksworth (3)
Party	Candidate	Votes	%	±%
Labour	Patricia Smith	1,811		
Labour	Peter Gibson	1,773		
Labour	John Donnelly	1,578		
Conservative	Dionne Ross	941		
Conservative	Norman Rosemurgey	922		
BNP	Joseph Dobbie	647		
Turnout		7,672	43.2	

Southwick (3)
Party	Candidate	Votes	%	±%
Labour	Margaret Higgins	1,680		
Labour	Maureen Ambrose	1,398		
Labour	Norma Wright	1,344		
Conservative	John Brown	762		
Conservative	John Calvert	701		
BNP	Alan Brettwood	698		
Turnout		6,583	37.8	

St Annes (3)
Party	Candidate	Votes	%	±%
Labour	Susan Watson	1,300		
Labour	Patricia Bates	1,252		
Labour	Thomas Wright	1,189		
Conservative	Marjorie Matthews	593		
Conservative	Norman Oliver	508		
BNP	Treena Smith	490		
Turnout		5,332	35.1	

St Chads (3)
Party	Candidate	Votes	%	±%
Labour	Leslie Scott	1,762		
Labour	John Porthouse	1,466		
Conservative	Robert Oliver	1,341		
Conservative	Paula Wilkinson	1,323		
Labour	Cecilia Gofton	1,240		
Conservative	Anthony Morrissey	1,145		
BNP	Carol Dobbie	430		
Turnout		8,707	46.4	

St Michaels (3)
Party	Candidate	Votes	%	±%
Conservative	Margaret Forbes	2,072		
Conservative	Peter Wood	1,997		
Conservative	Paul Maddison	1,918		
Labour	Garry Dent	1,045		
Labour	Barbara McClennan	861		
Labour	Phillip Gibson	821		
Liberal Democrats	Geoffrey Pryke	656		
BNP	Pauline Smith	302		
Turnout		9,672	48.3	

St Peters (3)
Party	Candidate	Votes	%	±%
Conservative	Lilian Walton	1,679		
Conservative	Graham Hall	1,609		
Labour	Christine Shattock	1,414		
Conservative	Alistair Newton	1,336		
Labour	Linda Mitchell	1,261		
Labour	David Errington	1,069		
BNP	Derek Wright	604		
Turnout		8,972	45.2	

Washington Central (3)
Party	Candidate	Votes	%	±%
Labour	Derek Sleightholme	1,880		
Labour	Eric Timmins	1,725		
Labour	Denis Whalen	1,621		
Liberal Democrats	Christine Griffin	860		
Conservative	Jacqueline Atkinson	797		
Conservative	Olwyn Bird	777		
Conservative	Kathleen Irvine	635		
BNP	Andrew Galloway	400		
Turnout		8,695	40.2	

Washington East (3)
Party	Candidate	Votes	%	±%
Labour	Peter Young	1,445		
Labour	Bryan Williams	1,360		
Labour	Neil Macknight	1,284		
Conservative	Kathryn Chamberlin	882		
Liberal Democrats	Avril Grundy	821		
Conservative	Ian Cuthbert	727		
Conservative	David Wilson	657		
BNP	Duncan Matthews	322		
Turnout		7,498	37.0	

Washington North (3)
Party	Candidate	Votes	%	±%
Labour	James Walker	1,876		
Labour	Peter Walker	1,500		
Labour	Pamela Baggaley	1,478		
Independent	John Bedlington	969		
Conservative	Russell Bloxsom	589		
BNP	Richard Templton	431		
Turnout		6,843	36.6	

Washington South (3)
Party	Candidate	Votes	%	±%
Labour	Linda Williams	1,135		
Labour	Joan Grey	994		
Liberal Democrats	Owen Dumpleton	972		
Conservative	Justin Garrod	851		
Labour	Robert Bowman	848		
Conservative	Jill Martin	731		
Independent	Walter Scott	669		
BNP	Gordon Pace	411		
Turnout		6,611	36.9	

Washington West (3)
Party	Candidate	Votes	%	±%
Labour	William Stephenson	1,585		
Labour	Henry Trueman	1,487		
Labour	Dennis Haworth	1,392		
Liberal Democrats	Irene Bannister	969		
Liberal Democrats	David Griffin	874		
Conservative	Robert Sharp	762		
BNP	Frank Butterfield	403		
Turnout		7,472	37.5	

Preceded by 2003 Sunderland City Council election	Sunderland City Council elections	Succeeded by 2006 Sunderland City Council election
