= 2014 Sunderland City Council election =

2014 UK local government election

← 2012	22 May 2014	2015 →

One third of 75 seats on Sunderland City Council 38 seats needed for a majority
	First party	Second party	Third party
Party	Labour	Conservative	Independent
Seats before	64	8	3
Seats won	21	3	1
Seats after	63	8	4
Seat change	▼1	0	▲1
- Map of the 2014 Sunderland City Council election results. Labour in red, Independent in grey and Conservatives in blue.
Majority party before election
Labour
Majority party after election
Labour

The 2014 Sunderland City Council Election took place on 22 May 2014 to elect members of Sunderland Metropolitan Borough Council in Tyne and Wear, England, as part of the wider 2014 United Kingdom local elections. A third of the council (25 of 75 seats) were up for election, the Labour Party stayed in overall control of the council.

== Election results ==
The Labour Party remained in control of the council, but had its majority reduced by one. Although Labour gained a seat from the Conservatives in St Chad's, they lost a seat to the Conservatives in St Peter's. Labour Party Mayor, Councillor Robert Heron, lost his Copt Hill seat to Independent candidate Anthony Allen by 70 votes. Labour's one gain against two losses left them with a net loss of one councillor. For the first time ever, UKIP fielded a candidate in almost every ward, which led to them finishing second behind Labour, in terms of the popular vote, with 24%. Although UKIP failed to gain a seat, they came within 119 votes in Hetton and came second in 16 of the 23 wards they contested. This also led to a reduction in Labour's share of the vote in 18 out of the 25 wards. The overall turnout in the election was 33%.

Sunderland local election result 2014
Party	Seats	Gains	Losses	Net gain/loss	Seats %	Votes %	Votes	+/−
Labour	21	1	2	▼1	84.0	46.3	32,349	▼2.7
UKIP	0	0	0	0	0.0	24.3	16,951	▲24.3
Conservative	3	1	1	0	12.0	19.4	13,571	▼5.8
Independent	1	1	0	▲1	4.0	3.8	2,674	▼0.2
Liberal Democrats	0	0	0	0	0.0	3.7	2,569	▼14.6
Green	0	0	0	0	0.0	1.8	1,263	▲1.5
TUSC	0	0	0	0	0.0	0.6	424	▲0.6

After the election, the composition of the council was as follows:

Party	Previous Council	New Council
Labour	64	63
Conservatives	8	8
Independent	3	4
Total	75	75
Working majority	53	51

== Ward by Ward results ==
Barnes Ward
Party	Candidate	Votes	%	±%
Labour	Michael Peter Essl	1,420	40.8	−0.1
Conservative	Peter O'Connor	1,287	37.0	+1.3
UKIP	Ralph Foster	608	17.5	NA
Liberal Democrats	Laura Helen Bruton	137	3.9	−14.1
Total votes		3,452	99.2	
Rejected ballots		28	0.8	
Turnout		3,480	39.4	−23.2
Majority		133	3.8	−1.4
Labour hold		Swing	-	

Castle Ward
Party	Candidate	Votes	%	±%
Labour Co-op	Doris Macknight	1,327	55.9	+5.1
UKIP	John Smail	656	27.6	NA
Conservative	Geoffrey Oliver	177	7.5	−3.1
TUSC	Gary Duncan	137	5.8	NA
Liberal Democrats	Ann Hollern	57	2.4	−9.5
Total votes		3452	99.2	
Rejected ballots		20	0.8	
Turnout		2374	27.7	
Majority		671		
Labour hold		Swing	-	

Copt Hill
Party	Candidate	Votes	%	±%
Independent	Anthony Allen	1,469	46.4	+3.3%
Labour Co-op	Bob Heron	1,399	44.2	−0.2
Conservative	Pat Francis	254	8.0	NA
Majority		70		
Turnout		3,166	34.8	
Rejected ballots		44	1.4	
Independent gain from Labour		Swing		

Doxford Ward
Party	Candidate	Votes	%	±%
Labour	Betty Gibson	1,280	47.0	−4.7
UKIP	Kay Rowham	683	25.0	NA
Conservative	Dominic McDonough	563	20.7	−9.0%
Green	Alan Michael David Robinson	180	6.6	NA
Majority		597		
Turnout		2726	35.3	
Rejected ballots		20	0.7	
Labour hold		Swing	-	

Fulwell Ward
Party	Candidate	Votes	%	±%
Conservative	George Edward Howe	1,591	43.3	−1.8
Labour	Margaret Beck	1,173	31.9	−3.7
UKIP	Paul Tweddle	635	17.3	NA
Green	Bill Martin	161	4.4	NA
Liberal Democrats	Geoffrey Michael Pryke	102	2.8	−16.4
Majority		418		
Turnout		3677	40.5	
Rejected ballots		15	0.4	
Conservative hold		Swing	-	

Hendon Ward
Party	Candidate	Votes	%	±%
Labour Co-op	Barbara McClennan	1162	50.1	
UKIP	Pauline Veronica Featonby-Warren	638	27.5	
Conservative	Debbie Lorraine	289	12.5	
Green	David Anthony Lawson	158	6.8	
TUSC	Owen Richard Taylor	70	3.0	
Majority		524		
Turnout		2338	27.9	
Rejected ballots		21	0.9	
Labour hold		Swing	-	

Hetton Ward
Party	Candidate	Votes	%	±%
Labour	John Cummings	1470	47.7	
UKIP	John Defty	1351	43.8	
Conservative	Doug Middlemiss	188	6.1	
Liberal Democrats	Philip Dowell	75	2.4	
Majority				
Turnout		3113	35.0	
Rejected ballots		29	0.9	
Labour hold		Swing	-	

Houghton Ward
Party	Candidate	Votes	%	±%
Labour	Billy Turton	1375	42.6	
Independent	John Verill Ellis	1076	33.4	
UKIP	Terrence Henderson	616	19.1	
Conservative	George Edward Brown	158	4.9	
Majority		299		
Turnout		3242	35.5	
Rejected ballots		17	0.5	
Labour hold		Swing	-	

Millfield Ward
Party	Candidate	Votes	%	±%
Labour Co-op	Ian William Kay	875	36.3	
Liberal Democrats	Brian Robson	784	32.6	
UKIP	Lee Robson	479	19.9	
Conservative	Gwennyth Gibson	159	6.6	
Green	Helmut Izaks	91	3.8	
TUSC	Karen Christian Sinclaire	28	1.2	
Majority		91		
Turnout		2424	31.9	
Rejected ballots		8	0.3	
Labour hold		Swing	-	

Pallion Ward
Party	Candidate	Votes	%	±%
Labour	Celia Gofton	1047	47.8	
UKIP	Daniel Tweddle	659	30.1	
Conservative	Shaun Cudworth	314	14.3	
Green	Charles Michael John Marshall	105	4.8	
Liberal Democrats	Sylvia Dorward	67	3.1	
Majority		388		
Turnout		2211	30.1	
Rejected ballots		19	0.9	
Labour hold		Swing	-	

Redhill Ward
Party	Candidate	Votes	%	±%
Independent	Heather Fagan	129	5.9%	
UKIP	Lynn Marie Kelly	608	27.9%	
Labour Co-op	Paul Stewart	1281	58.7%	
Liberal Democrats	Steve Thomas	36	1.6%	
Conservative	Paula Wilinson	129	5.9%	
Majority				
Turnout		2202	25.9	
Rejected ballots		19	0.9	
Labour hold		Swing	-	

Ryhope Ward
Party	Candidate	Votes	%	±%
Labour	Alan Emerson	1260	47.0	
UKIP	Bryan George Foster	881	32.9	
Conservative	Alex Douglas	372	13.9	
Green	Tim Brennan	91	3.4	
Liberal Democrats	Matthew Dowell	75	2.8	
Majority		379		
Turnout		2699	33.1	
Rejected ballots		20	0.7	
Labour hold		Swing	-	

Sandhill Ward
Party	Candidate	Votes	%	±%
Labour	David Allan	1478	65.6	
Conservative	Christine Mary Reed	546	24.2	
Liberal Democrats	Susan Wilson	230	10.2	
Majority		932		
Turnout		2324	27.9	
Rejected ballots		70	3.0	
Labour hold		Swing	-	

Shiney Row Ward
Party	Candidate	Votes	%	±%
Labour	Mel Speding	1668	52.2	
UKIP	Tom Fowdy	940	29.4	
Conservative	Sally Oliver	480	15.0	
Liberal Democrats	Sue Sterling	105	3.3	
Majority		728		
Turnout		3213	32.3	
Rejected ballots		20	0.6	
Labour hold		Swing	-	

Silksworth Ward
Party	Candidate	Votes	%	±%
UKIP	Derek Horsley	867	31.1%	
Conservative	Bryan Reynolds	453	16.3%	
Labour	Phil Tye	1467	52.6%	
Majority				
Turnout		2817	33.2	
Rejected ballots		30	1.0	
Labour hold		Swing	-	

Southwick Ward
Party	Candidate	Votes	%	±%
UKIP	Bradley Cowling	780	31.7	
Conservative	Michael Henderson Leadbitter	324	13.2	
Liberal Democrats	Sham Vedhara	63	2.6	
Labour Co-op	Norma Wright	1262	51.3	
Majority		482	19.6	
Turnout		2458	30.1	
Rejected ballots		20	0.8	
Labour hold		Swing	-	

St Anne's Ward
Party	Candidate	Votes	%	±%
Conservative	Tony Morrisey	299	14.1	
Green	Caroline Leigh Robinson	92	4.3	
UKIP	Keith Samme	702	33	
Labour Co-op	Tom Wright	1022	48	
Majority		723	34	
Turnout		2127	25.0	
Rejected ballots		12	0.6	
Labour hold		Swing	-	

St Chad's Ward
Party	Candidate	Votes	%	±%
Liberal Democrats	Margaret Crosby	90	3.1	
Labour	Gillian Galbraith	1180	40.6	
UKIP	Jamie Lee Nast	610	21	
Conservative	Keith Charles O'Brien	1015	34.9	
Majority		165	5.7	
Turnout		2909	36.9	
Rejected ballots		14	0.5	
Labour gain from Conservative		Swing	-	

St Michael's Ward
Party	Candidate	Votes	%	±%
UKIP	Vincent Gray Costello	606	18	
Conservative	Michael Dixon	1501	44.6	
Green	Rachel Sarah Featherstone	250	7.4	
Labour	Zafar Iqbal	866	25.7	
Liberal Democrats	Andrew Wood	131	3.9	
Majority		635	18.9	
Turnout		3364	38.8	
Rejected ballots		10	0.3	
Conservative hold		Swing	-	

St Peter's Ward
Party	Candidate	Votes	%	±%
Conservative	Shirley Leadbitter	1,088	36.4%	+0.6
Labour	Stephen Bonallie	999	33.4	−3.8
UKIP	Brenda Tweddle	653	21.8	NA
Green	Saied Satei	135	4.5	NA
TUSC	Doug Beavers	114	3.8	NA
Majority		89	3	
Turnout		2,989	34.8	
Rejected ballots		29	1.0	
Conservative gain from Labour		Swing	-2.2	

Washington Central Ward
Party	Candidate	Votes	%	±%
Labour	Linda Williams	1624	53.4	+0.3
UKIP	Erland Max Howard Polden	939	30.9	N/A
Conservative	Marjorie Matthews	343	11.3	−12.5
Liberal Democrats	Anne Griffin	137	4.5	−18.6
Majority		685	22.4	−6.9
Turnout		3057	34.4	25.8
Rejected ballots		14	0.5	
Labour hold		Swing	-	

Washington East Ward
Party	Candidate	Votes	%	±%
Labour	Neville Padgett	1254	41.3	−3.7
UKIP	Linda Hudson	792	26.1	N/A
Conservative	Hilary Johnson	767	25.3	−6.5
Liberal Democrats	Malcolm Bannister	145	4.8	−13.9
TUSC	Wilf Laws	75	2.5	N/A
Majority		462	15.1	−1.9
Turnout		3056	34.3	−26.4
Rejected ballots		23	0.8	
Labour hold		Swing	-5.1	

Washington North
Party	Candidate	Votes	%	±%
Labour	Jill Fletcher	1544	58.7	+1.5
UKIP	Tony Ormond	815	31.0	N/A
Conservative	Alice Miller Mclaren	203	7.7	−6.4
Liberal Democrats	Kevin Morris	67	2.5	−17.2
Majority		729	27.5	−10
Turnout		2652	30.6	−20.6
Rejected ballots		23	0.9	
Labour hold		Swing	+3.95 (Con to Lab)	

Washington South
Party	Candidate	Votes	%	±%
Labour Co-op	Graeme Miller	1239	44.9	−4.5
UKIP	Alistair Baxter	740	28.8	N/A
Conservative	Martin John Talbot	638	23.1	+3.6
Liberal Democrats	David Griffin	140	5.1	−19.9
Majority		499	18	+8.4
Turnout		2775	34.1	26.6
Rejected ballots		18	0.6	
Labour hold		Swing	-4.05 (Lab to Con)	

Washington West
Party	Candidate	Votes	%	±%
Labour	Dorothy Trueman	1677	57.0	+7.6
UKIP	Kevin John Shephard	703	23.9	N/A
Conservative	Olwyn Bird	433	14.7	−4.8
Liberal Democrats	Irene Bannister	128	4.4	−20.6
Majority		974	32.9	−304
Turnout		2960	32.4	−26
Rejected ballots		19	0.6	
Labour hold		Swing	+14.1 (Lib Dem to Lab)	

Preceded by 2012 Sunderland City Council election	Sunderland City Council elections	Succeeded by 2015 Sunderland City Council election
