= 2006 Sunderland City Council election =

2016 local election in Sunderland

- 4 May 2006

One third of 75 seats on Sunderland City Council 38 seats needed for a majority
	First party	Second party	Third party
Party	Labour	Conservative	Liberal Democrats
Seats before	60	12	2
Seats won	19	5	1
Seats after	59	13	2
Seat change	▼1	▲1	0
	Fourth party
Party	Independent
Seats before	1
Seats won	0
Seats after	1
Seat change	0
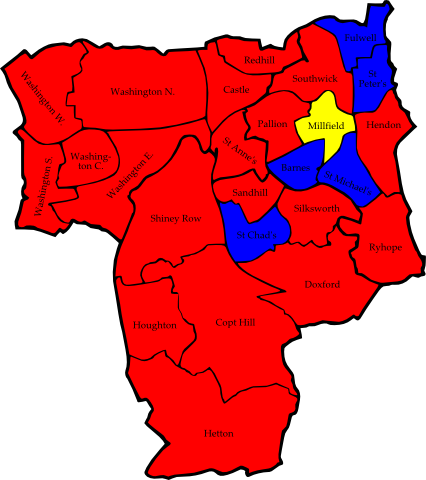
- Map of the 2006 Sunderland City Council election results. Labour in red, Conservatives in blue, and Liberal Democrats in yellow.
Majority party before election
Labour
Majority party after election
Labour

The 2006 Sunderland Council election took place on 4 May 2006 to elect members of Sunderland City Council in Tyne and Wear, England. One third of the council was up for election and the Labour Party stayed in overall control.

== Campaign ==
Before the election the council was composed of 60 Labour, 12 Conservative, 2 Liberal Democrat and 1 independent councillors. In the period since the previous local elections in May 2004, there had been two by-elections, in Barnes Ward and Millfield Ward (with seats held by the Conservatives and Liberal Democrats respectively), and Doxford councillor Mike Tansey had left the Labour Party to sit as an Independent.

In total 99 candidates stood in the election for the 25 seats that were being contested, with the Labour Party, Conservative Party and British National Party contesting every seat. Other candidates included 22 from the Liberal Democrats and 1 from the Official Monster Raving Loony Party. The council was safe for Labour, but the Conservatives were hoping to make gains in the wards of Doxford, St Peters, Washington East and Washington South.

Sunderland was one of 4 local councils which had early polling stations available so voters could vote up to 2 weeks before the election.

== Election results ==
The results saw Labour keep a strong majority on the council after finishing just one seat down with 59 councillors. The Labour leader of the council, Robert Symonds, was among those to hold his seat in Castle ward, but the party did lose 2 seats including St Peters to the Conservatives. The other Labour loss was to the Liberal Democrats in Millfield, but Labour also gained Washington South from the Liberal Democrats. This meant the Conservatives had 13 seats, the Liberal Democrats 2 and 1 independent. Meanwhile, the British National Party failed to win any seats, but did win almost 15% of the vote. Overall turnout was 32.2%, with 1,436 voters having used the early voting scheme, while 30,304 people used postal voting, which was 67.54% of those registered to vote by post.

Following the election the leader of the Conservative group, Peter Wood, was challenged for the leadership by Lee Martin, but held on by one vote.

Sunderland local election result 2006
Party	Seats	Gains	Losses	Net gain/loss	Seats %	Votes %	Votes	+/−
Labour	19	1	2	▼1	76.0	40.5	27,546	▼14.9
Conservative	5	1	0	▲1	20.0	28.4	19,280	▼0.5
Liberal Democrats	1	1	1	0	4.0	15.7	10,683	▲7.7
BNP	0	0	0	0	0	14.6	9,948	▲8.0
Independent	0	0	0	0	0	0.7	449	▼0.2
Monster Raving Loony	0	0	0	0	0	0.1	48	▲0.1

This resulted in the following composition of the council:

Party	Previous Council	New Council
Labour	60	59
Conservatives	12	13
Liberal Democrats	2	2
Independent	1	1
Total	75	75
Working majority	45	43

== Ward by ward results ==
Barnes
Party	Candidate	Votes	%	±%
Conservative	Michael Arnott	1,540	46.6	
Labour	David Errington	779	23.6	
Liberal Democrats	Peter Taylor	652	19.7	
BNP	Jason Dent	334	10.1	
Majority		761	23.0	
Turnout		3,305	37.3	−11.2
Conservative hold		Swing		

Castle
Party	Candidate	Votes	%	±%
Labour	Robert Symonds	1,203	49.7	
BNP	Ian McDonald	515	21.3	
Independent	Stephen Hanratty	449	18.6	
Conservative	Alice Mclaren	253	10.5	
Majority		688	28.4	
Turnout		2,420	28.4	−7.9
Labour hold		Swing		

Copt Hill
Party	Candidate	Votes	%	±%
Labour	Robert Heron	1,372	50.7	
Conservative	David Wilson	898	33.2	
BNP	Michael Webb	438	16.2	
Majority		474	17.5	
Turnout		2,708	29.8	−7.4
Labour hold		Swing		

Doxford
Party	Candidate	Votes	%	±%
Labour	Elizabeth Gibson	1,020	39.1	
Conservative	Peter Elliot-West	758	29.1	
Liberal Democrats	James Major	438	16.8	
BNP	Peter Swain	391	15.0	
Majority		262	10.0	
Turnout		2,607	32.5	−6.4
Labour hold		Swing		

Fulwell
Party	Candidate	Votes	%	±%
Conservative	George Howe	1,996	52.2	
Labour	Robert Price	977	25.5	
Liberal Democrats	Leslie Wascoe	459	12.0	
BNP	Joseph Dobbie	392	10.3	
Majority		1,019	26.6	
Turnout		3,824	42.7	−9.0
Conservative hold		Swing		

Hendon
Party	Candidate	Votes	%	±%
Labour	Mary Smith	1,062	41.9	
BNP	David Guynan	534	21.1	
Conservative	Alistair Newton	528	20.8	
Liberal Democrats	John Jackson	361	14.3	
Monster Raving Loony	Rosalyn Warner	48	1.9	
Majority		528	20.8	
Turnout		2,533	31.4	−4.6
Labour hold		Swing		

Hetton
Party	Candidate	Votes	%	±%
Labour	Richard Tate	1,364	56.8	
BNP	John Richardson	544	22.6	
Conservative	George Brown	494	20.6	
Majority		820	34.1	
Turnout		2,402	27.4	−9.8
Labour hold		Swing		

Houghton
Party	Candidate	Votes	%	±%
Labour	Dennis Richardson	1,312	50.6	
Liberal Democrats	Avril Snowball	476	18.4	
Conservative	Jane Wilson	428	16.5	
BNP	Lesley Dathan	376	14.5	
Majority		836	32.3	−6.0
Turnout		2,592	29.6	
Labour hold		Swing		

Millfield
Party	Candidate	Votes	%	±%
Liberal Democrats	Peter Maddison	856	41.0	
Labour	Kevin O'Connor	660	31.6	
Conservative	Leslie Dobson	313	15.0	
BNP	Christopher Lathan	258	12.4	
Majority		196	9.4	
Turnout		2,087	29.2	−6.7
Liberal Democrats gain from Labour		Swing		

Pallion
Party	Candidate	Votes	%	±%
Labour	Cecilia Gofton	1,013	43.5	
Liberal Democrats	Margaret Hollern	453	19.4	
BNP	James Davison	441	18.9	
Conservative	Gwennyth Gibson	424	18.2	
Majority		560	24.0	
Turnout		2,331	29.7	−6.3
Labour hold		Swing		

Redhill
Party	Candidate	Votes	%	±%
Labour	Paul Stewart	1,313	51.1	
BNP	Ian Leadbitter	687	26.8	
Liberal Democrats	David Griffin	302	11.8	
Conservative	Gillian Connor	266	10.4	
Majority		626	24.4	
Turnout		2,568	29.7	−6.8
Labour hold		Swing		

Ryhope
Party	Candidate	Votes	%	±%
Labour	David Wares	1,077	41.2	
Conservative	Stephen Daughton	740	28.3	
BNP	William Brown	415	15.9	
Liberal Democrats	Jane Walters	383	14.6	
Majority		337	12.9	
Turnout		2,615	32.6	−5.0
Labour hold		Swing		

Sandhill
Party	Candidate	Votes	%	±%
Labour	David Allan	1,033	42.7	
Conservative	Richard Vardy	577	23.8	
Liberal Democrats	Gary Hollern	439	18.1	
BNP	Joseph Dobbie	373	15.4	
Majority		456	18.8	
Turnout		2,422	29.0	−7.7
Labour hold		Swing		

Shiney Row
Party	Candidate	Votes	%	±%
Labour	Melville Speding	1,477	50.0	
Conservative	Douglas Middlemiss	552	18.7	
Liberal Democrats	Paul Forster	548	18.5	
BNP	Sharon Leadbitter	379	12.8	
Majority		925	31.3	
Turnout		2,956	30.5	−8.3
Labour hold		Swing		

Silksworth
Party	Candidate	Votes	%	±%
Labour	Philip Tye	1,345	45.6	
Conservative	Paula Wilkinson	691	23.4	
Liberal Democrats	Sandra Hall	479	16.2	
BNP	Anthony James	433	14.7	
Majority		654	22.2	
Turnout		2,948	34.9	−8.3
Labour hold		Swing		

Southwick
Party	Candidate	Votes	%	±%
Labour	Norma Wright	1,063	42.1	
Conservative	Terence Docherty	536	21.3	
BNP	Alan Brettwood	532	21.1	
Liberal Democrats	Christine Griffin	391	15.5	
Majority		527	20.9	
Turnout		2,522	30.8	−7.0
Labour hold		Swing		

St Annes
Party	Candidate	Votes	%	±%
Labour	Thomas Wright	977	45.5	
Conservative	Marjorie Matthews	440	20.5	
Liberal Democrats	Emma Pryke	368	17.1	
BNP	John Boyd	362	16.9	
Majority		537	25.0	
Turnout		2,147	27.7	−7.4
Labour hold		Swing		

St Chads
Party	Candidate	Votes	%	±%
Conservative	Robert Oliver	1,743	54.0	
Labour	Alan Whitwham	1,017	31.5	
BNP	Carol Dobbie	250	7.7	
Liberal Democrats	Diana Lambton	218	6.8	
Majority		726	22.5	
Turnout		3,228	41.0	−5.4
Conservative hold		Swing		

St Michaels
Party	Candidate	Votes	%	±%
Conservative	Paul Maddison	1,680	53.1	
Labour	Garry Dent	640	20.2	
Liberal Democrats	Lesley Dixon	523	16.5	
BNP	Ian Sayers	321	10.1	
Majority		1,040	32.9	
Turnout		3,164	38.5	−9.8
Conservative hold		Swing		

St Peters
Party	Candidate	Votes	%	±%
Conservative	Shirley Leadbitter	1,289	41.5	
Labour	Christine Shattock	947	30.5	
Liberal Democrats	Geoffrey Pryke	470	15.1	
BNP	John McCaffrey	402	12.9	
Majority		342	11.0	
Turnout		3,108	38.1	−7.1
Conservative gain from Labour		Swing		

Washington Central
Party	Candidate	Votes	%	±%
Labour	Denis Whalen	1,263	44.1	
Liberal Democrats	Edward Keogh	622	21.7	
Conservative	Jacqueline Atkinson	576	20.1	
BNP	Kevin Lathan	404	14.1	
Majority		641	22.4	
Turnout		2,865	32.4	−7.8
Labour hold		Swing		

Washington East
Party	Candidate	Votes	%	±%
Labour	Neil MacKnight	1,103	38.3	
Conservative	Ian Cuthbert	1,005	34.9	
Liberal Democrats	Avril Grundy	487	16.9	
BNP	Derek Wright	286	9.9	
Majority		98	3.4	
Turnout		2,881	33.2	−3.8
Labour hold		Swing		

Washington North
Party	Candidate	Votes	%	±%
Labour	Jill Fletcher	1,343	54.8	
Liberal Democrats	Paul Hillman	455	18.6	
Conservative	Russell Bloxsom	354	14.4	
BNP	David Laing	299	12.2	
Majority		888	36.2	
Turnout		2,451	28.1	−8.5
Labour hold		Swing		

Washington South
Party	Candidate	Votes	%	±%
Labour	Graeme Miller	786	30.9	
Conservative	Kathyrn Chamberlin	751	29.5	
Liberal Democrats	Robert Boyce	720	28.3	
BNP	Deborah Boyd	290	11.4	
Majority		35	1.4	
Turnout		2,547	30.9	−6.0
Labour gain from Liberal Democrats		Swing		

Washington West
Party	Candidate	Votes	%	±%
Labour	Jean Stephenson	1,400	51.4	
Liberal Democrats	Irene Bannister	583	21.4	
Conservative	Olwyn Bird	448	16.5	
BNP	Frederick Donkin	292	10.7	
Majority		817	30.0	
Turnout		2,723	30.5	−7.0
Labour hold		Swing		

Preceded by 2004 Sunderland City Council election	Sunderland City Council elections	Succeeded by 2007 Sunderland City Council election
