= 2018 Sunderland City Council election =

2018 UK local government election

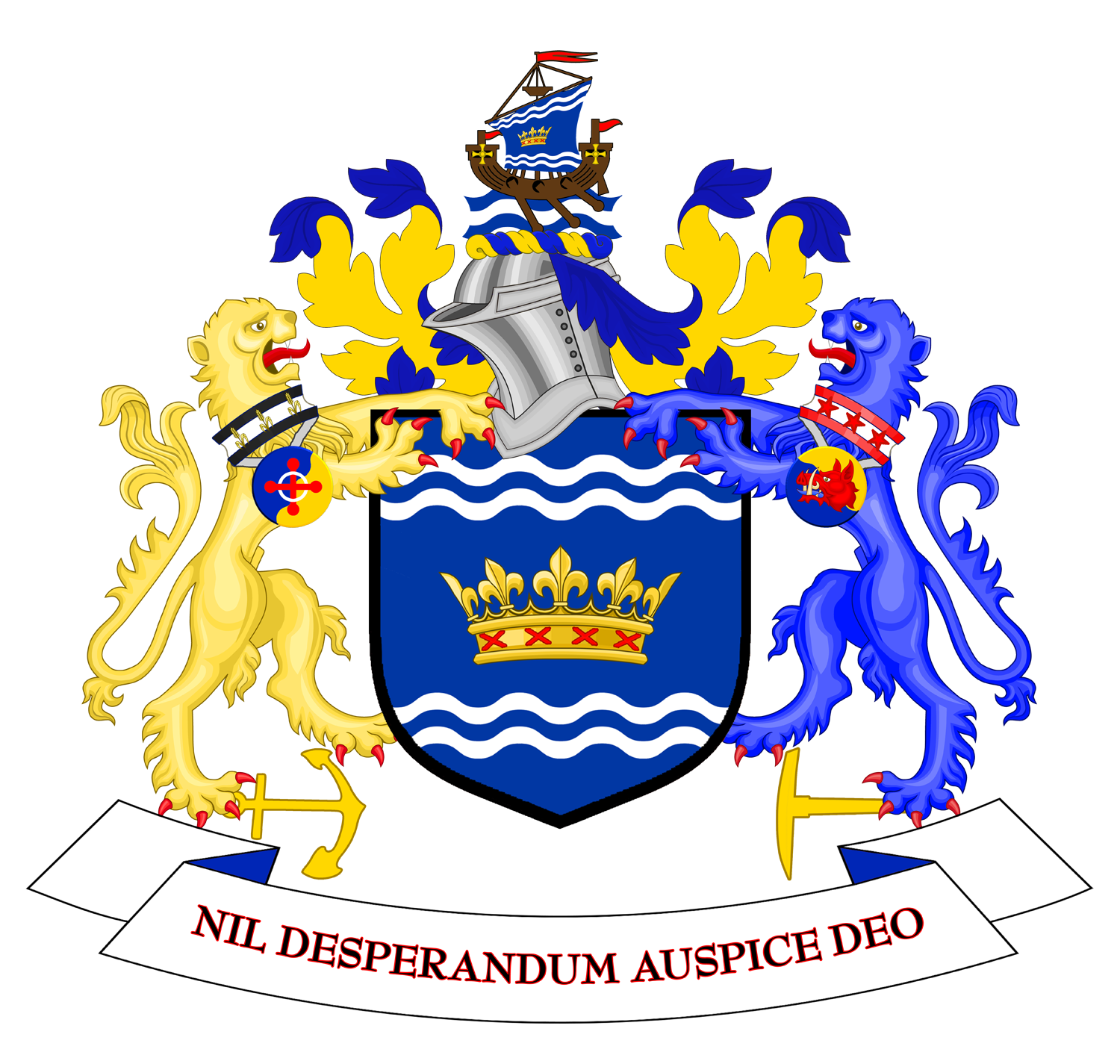
- 3 May 2018

One third of 75 seats on Sunderland City Council 38 seats needed for a majority
	First party	Second party	Third party
Party	Labour	Conservative	Liberal Democrats
Seats before	65	6	3
Seats won	17	5	3
Seats after	61	8	6
Seat change	▼4	▲2	▲3
	Fourth party
Party	Independent
Seats before	1
Seats won	0
Seats after	0
Seat change	▼1
- Map of the 2018 Sunderland City Council election results. Labour in red, Conservatives in blue, and Liberal Democrats in yellow.
Majority party before election
Labour
Majority party after election
Labour

The 2018 Sunderland City Council election took place on 3 May 2018 to elect members of Sunderland City Council in England. The election took place on the same day as other local elections.

== Background ==
In the period since the previous local elections in 2016, the Liberal Democrats had won two seats from Labour in by-elections: in January 2017 in Sandhill ward, and February 2018 in Pallion ward.

The Labour, Conservative and Green Parties all fielded 25 candidates in the election. The Liberal Democrats fielded 22 candidates, and there were 4 Independent candidates. UKIP did not field any candidates, despite taking 11% of the vote at the previous election. The election saw a debut for the Populist Party and For Britain, fielding one candidate each.

== Election results ==
The election saw Labour defend 16 seats and gain one seat, winning the Copt Hill ward from an independent councillor. The Liberal Democrats took seats from Labour in Millfield, Pallion, and Sandhill. The Conservatives held the seats they were defending in Fulwell, St Michael's, and St Peter's, and gained from Labour in St Chad's and Barnes.

The election result was the worst for the Labour Party in Sunderland since 2012. It was the Conservatives' best result since 2008, and the best result for the Liberal Democrats since 1982 (when they stood as the SDP/Liberal Alliance).

The overall turnout was 32.9%

Sunderland local election result 2018
Party	Seats	Gains	Losses	Net gain/loss	Seats %	Votes %	Votes	+/−
Labour	17	1	5	▼4	68.0	47.0	32,344	▼7.0
Conservative	5	2	0	▲2	20.0	29.3	20,195	▲7.2
Liberal Democrats	3	3	0	▲3	12.0	12.1	8,342	▲5.1
Green	0	0	0	0	0.0	6.1	4,196	▲2.1
Independent	0	0	1	▼1	0.0	4.1	2,820	▲3.0
Populist Party	0	0	0	0	0.0	0.6	414	▲0.6
North East	0	0	0	0	0.0	0.5	342	0.0
For Britain	0	0	0	0	0.0	0.2	156	▲0.2

This resulted in the following composition of the council:

Party	Previous Council	New Council
Labour	65	61
Conservatives	6	8
Liberal Democrats	3	6
Independent	1	0
Total	75	75
Working majority	55	47

== Ward by ward results ==
Asterisk denotes incumbent councillor.

=== Barnes Ward ===
Barnes Ward
Party	Candidate	Votes	%	±%
Conservative	Antony Mullen†	1,560	45.1	▲8.1
Labour	Zaf Iqbal	1,238	35.8	▼5
Liberal Democrats	Timothy Ellis	432	12.5	▲8.6
Green	Caroline Robinson	220	6.4	▲6.4
Rejected ballots		6	0.2	▼0.6
Majority		322	9.3	▲5.5
Turnout		3,456	40.7	▲1.3
Registered electors		8,484		
Conservative gain from Labour		Swing	▲6.6	

†Antony Mullen was suspended by the Conservative Party during the election, and was under investigation due to a series of offensive social media posts he has made about Sunderland and Labour MP Diane Abbott. He remained on the ballot as a Conservative candidate, and was reinstated after being elected. The investigation showed no wrong whatsoever and he was fully reinstated.

=== Castle Ward ===
Castle Ward
Party	Candidate	Votes	%	±%
Labour	Doris MacKnight*	1,358	63.0	▲7.1
Conservative	James Doyle	439	20.1	▲12.6
Green	Rebecca Lapping	178	8.3	▲8.3
Liberal Democrats	Jack Stoker	174	8.1	▲5.7
Rejected ballots		6	0.3	▼0.5
Majority		919	42.6	▲23.2
Turnout		2,155	25.7	▼2
Registered electors		8,387		
Labour hold		Swing	▲17.4†	

†Swing to the Labour candidate from UKIP, who had stood last time this seat was contested.

=== Copt Hill Ward ===
Copt Hill Ward
Party	Candidate	Votes	%	±%
Labour	Jack Cunningham	1,400	48.6	▲4.4
Independent	Anthony Allen*	940	32.6	▼13.8
Conservative	Patricia Francis	428	14.8	▲6.8
Green	Esme Featherstone	108	3.7	▲3.7
Rejected ballots		7	0.2	▼1.2
Majority		460	16	▲13.8
Turnout		2,883	32.4	▼2.4
Registered electors		8,889		
Labour gain from Independent		Swing	▲9.1	

=== Doxford Ward ===
Doxford Ward
Party	Candidate	Votes	%	±%
Labour	Elizabeth Gibson*	1,258	44.4	▲11.4
Conservative	George Brown	1,199	42.3	▲35
Green	Alan Robinson	208	7.3	▼3.1
Liberal Democrats	Peter Walton	170	6.0	▲7.9
Rejected ballots		6	0.3	▼0.4
Majority		59	2.1	▼19.8
Turnout		2,155	25.7	▼9.6
Registered electors		8,387		
Labour hold		Swing	▲18.2†	

†Swing to the Labour candidate from UKIP, who had stood last time this seat was contested.

=== Fulwell Ward ===
Fulwell Ward
Party	Candidate	Votes	%	±%
Conservative	George Howe*	1,816	46.6	▲3.3
Labour	Christopher Harding	1,289	33.1	▲1.2
Liberal Democrats	Malcolm Bond	631	16.2	▲13.4
Green	Steven Murray	159	4.1	▼0.3
Rejected ballots		19	0.5	▲0.1
Majority		527	13.5	▲2.1
Turnout		3,914	43.7	▲3.2
Registered electors		8,949		
Conservative hold		Swing	▲10.3†	

†Swing to the Conservative candidate from UKIP, who had stood last time this seat was contested.

=== Hendon Ward ===
Hendon Ward
Party	Candidate	Votes	%	±%
Labour	Barbara McClennan*	1,029	47.4	▼2.7
Conservative	Syed Ali	421	19.4	▲6.9
North East Party	Kris Brown	342	15.7	▲15.7
Green	Richard Bradley	239	11	▲4.2
Liberal Democrats	Anthony Usher	134	6.2	▲6.2
Rejected ballots		8	0.4	▼0.5
Majority		608	28	▲5.6
Turnout		2,173	27.6	▼0.3
Registered electors		7,870		
Labour hold		Swing	▼4.8	

=== Hetton Ward ===
Hetton Ward
Party	Candidate	Votes	%	±%
Labour	Claire Rowntree	1,480	53.3	▲5.6
Independent	David Geddis	799	28.8	▲28.8
Conservative	Douglas Middlemiss	358	12.9	▲6.8
Green	Rachel Lowe	74	2.7	▲2.7
Liberal Democrats	Diana Matthew	54	1.9	▼0.5
Rejected ballots		12	0.4	▼0.5
Majority		681	24.5	▲20.7
Turnout		2,777	30.8	▼4.2
Registered electors		9,029		
Labour hold		Swing	▲24.7†	

†Swing to the Labour candidate from UKIP, who had stood last time this seat was contested.

=== Houghton Ward ===
Houghton Ward
Party	Candidate	Votes	%	±%
Labour	Neil MacKnight	1,630	54.2	▲11.6
Independent	Linda Wood	737	24.5	▲24.5
Conservative	Craig Morrison	460	15.3	▲10.4
Liberal Democrats	Susan Sterling	97	3.2	▲3.2
Green	Graham Martin	79	2.6	▼2.6
Rejected ballots		4	0.1	▼0.4
Majority		893	29.7	▲20.5
Turnout		3,007	32	▼3.5
Registered electors		9,409		
Labour hold		Swing	▲22.5†	

†Swing to Labour from an independent candidate, who had stood last time this seat was contested.

=== Millfield Ward ===
Millfield Ward
Party	Candidate	Votes	%	±%
Liberal Democrats	Andrew Wood	1,522	58	▲25.4
Labour	Iain Kay*	871	33.2	▼3.1
Conservative	Gwennyth Gibson	155	5.9	▼0.7
Green	Billy Howells	73	2.8	▼1
Rejected ballots		4	0.2	▼0.1
Majority		651	24.8	▲21
Turnout		2,625	36.7	▲4.8
Registered electors		7,156		
Liberal Democrats gain from Labour		Swing	▲14.3	

=== Pallion Ward ===
Pallion Ward
Party	Candidate	Votes	%	±%
Liberal Democrats	George Smith	1,461	60.1	▲57
Labour	Elise Thompson	714	29.4	▼18.4
Conservative	Grant Shearer	178	7.3	▼7
Green	Craig Hardy	76	3.1	▼1.7
Rejected ballots		3	0.1	▼0.8
Majority		747	30.7	▲13.2
Turnout		2,432	32.7	▲2.6
Registered electors		7,445		
Liberal Democrats gain from Labour		Swing	▲37.7	

A by-election had been held in one of the other seats in Pallion Ward in February 2018 following the death of the incumbent Labour councillor. The by-election was won by the Liberal Democrats.

=== Redhill Ward ===
Redhill Ward
Party	Candidate	Votes	%	±%
Labour	Paul Stewart*	1,168	60.1	▲1.4
Independent	Heather Fagan	344	17.7	▲11.8
Conservative	Neville Chamberlin	343	17.6	▲11.7
Green	Rafal Marzec	85	4.4	▲4.4
Rejected ballots		5	0.6	▼0.4
Majority		824	42.4	▲11.8
Turnout		1,945	24.2	▼1.7
Registered electors		8,039		
Labour hold		Swing	▲14.7†	

†Swing to the Labour candidate from UKIP, who had stood last time this seat was contested.

=== Ryhope Ward ===
Ryhope Ward
Party	Candidate	Votes	%	±%
Labour	Michael Essl	1,286	50.7	▲3.7
Conservative	Paula Wilkinson	797	31.4	▲17.5
Green	Emma Robson	290	11.4	▲8
Liberal Democrats	Keith Townsend	149	5.9	▲3.1
Rejected ballots		13	0.5	▼0.2
Majority		489	19.3	▲5.3
Turnout		2,535	31	▼3.1
Registered electors		8,169		
Labour hold		Swing	▲18.3†	

†Swing to the Labour candidate from UKIP, who had stood last time this seat was contested.

=== Sandhill Ward ===
Sandhill Ward
Party	Candidate	Votes	%	±%
Liberal Democrats	Lynn Appleby	1,025	45.1	▲34.9
Labour	Dave Allan*	820	36	▼29.6
Conservative	Michael Leadbitter	317	13.9	▼10.3
Green	John Appleton	110	4.8	▲4.8
Rejected ballots		3	0.1	▼2.9
Majority		205	9	▼31.1
Turnout		2,275	29	▲1.1
Registered electors		7,858		
Liberal Democrats gain from Labour		Swing	▲32.3	

A by-election had been held in one of the other seats in Sandhill Ward in January 2017 following the disqualification of the incumbent Labour councillor for non-attendance. The by-election was won by the Liberal Democrats.

=== Shiney Row Ward ===
Shiney Row Ward
Party	Candidate	Votes	%	±%
Labour	Mel Speding*	1,704	54.4	▲2.2
Conservative	Sally Oliver	742	23.7	▲8.7
Populist Party	Tony Morrow	414	13.2	▲13.2
Green	Neil Shaplin	147	4.7	▲4.7
Liberal Democrats	Nana Boddy	128	4.1	▲0.8
Rejected ballots		7	0.2	▼0.4
Majority		962	30.6	▲7.9
Turnout		3,142	32.2	▼0.1
Registered electors		9,747		
Labour hold		Swing	▲15.8†	

†Swing to the Labour candidate from UKIP, who had stood last time this seat was contested.

=== Silksworth Ward ===
Silksworth Ward
Party	Candidate	Votes	%	±%
Labour	Phil Tye*	1,417	52.4	▼0.2
Conservative	Bryan Reynolds	880	32.6	▲16.3
Liberal Democrats	Thomas Crawford	203	7.5	▲7.5
Green	Chris Crozier	202	7.5	▲7.5
Rejected ballots		7	0.3	▼0.7
Majority		537	19.8	▲1.5
Turnout		2,709	33.5	▲0.2
Registered electors		8,090		
Labour hold		Swing	▼8.3	

=== Southwick Ward ===
Southwick Ward
Party	Candidate	Votes	%	±%
Labour	Alex Samuels	1,307	54.6	▲3.1
Conservative	Clair Hall	627	26.2	▲13
Liberal Democrats	Bill Meeks	315	13.2	▲10.6
Green	Anna Debska	139	5.8	▲5.8
Rejected ballots		7	0.3	▼0.5
Majority		680	28.4	▲8.8
Turnout		2,395	29.7	▼0.4
Registered electors		8,071		
Labour hold		Swing	▲17.4†	

†Swing to the Labour candidate from UKIP, who had stood last time this seat was contested.

=== St Anne's Ward ===
St Anne's Ward
Party	Candidate	Votes	%	±%
Labour	Karen Wood	1,062	51.2	▲3.2
Conservative	Gavin Wilson	620	29.9	▲15.8
Liberal Democrats	Emma Neale	260	12.5	▲12.5
Green	Gary Ogle	122	5.9	▲1.6
Rejected ballots		10	0.5	▼0.1
Majority		442	21.3	▼12.7
Turnout		2,074	26.2	▲1.2
Registered electors		7,926		
Labour hold		Swing	▲18.1†	

†Swing to the Labour candidate from UKIP, who had stood last time this seat was contested.

=== St Chad's Ward ===
St Chad's Ward
Party	Candidate	Votes	%	±%
Conservative	William Blackett	1,268	44.9	▲10
Labour	Gillian Galbraith*	1,203	42.6	▼2
Liberal Democrats	Margaret Crosby	261	9.3	▲6.2
Green	Helmut Izaks	89	3.2	▲3.2
Rejected ballots		0	0	▼0.5
Majority		65	2.3	▼3.4
Turnout		2,821	37.6	▲0.7
Registered electors		7,506		
Conservative gain from Labour		Swing	▲6	

=== St Michael's Ward ===
St Michael's Ward
Party	Candidate	Votes	%	±%
Conservative	Michael Dixon*	1,958	58.3	▲13.7
Labour	Steve Hansom	990	29.5	▲3.8
Green	Robert Welsh	220	6.6	▼0.8
Liberal Democrats	Julia Potts	184	5.5	▲1.6
Rejected ballots		4	0.1	▼0.2
Majority		968	28.8	▲9.9
Turnout		3,356	40	▲1.2
Registered electors		8,395		
Conservative hold		Swing	▲15.9†	

†Swing to the Conservative candidate from UKIP, who had stood last time this seat was contested.

=== St Peter's Ward ===
St Peter's Ward
Party	Candidate	Votes	%	±%
Conservative	Shirley Leadbitter*	1,457	43.3	▲6.9
Labour	Ken Richardson	1,256	37.3	▲3.9
Liberal Democrats	John Lennox	418	12.4	▲12.4
Green	Rachel Featherstone	236	7.6	▲3.1
Rejected ballots		7	0.2	▼0.8
Majority		201	6	▲3
Turnout		3,374	41.6	▲6.8
Registered electors		8,111		
Conservative hold		Swing	▲14.4†	

†Swing to the Conservative candidate from UKIP, who had stood last time this seat was contested.

=== Washington Central Ward ===
Washington Central Ward
Party	Candidate	Votes	%	±%
Labour	Linda Williams*	1,800	60.6	▲7.2
Conservative	Anna Snell	907	30.5	▲19.2
Green	Michal Chantkowski	251	8.5	▲8.5
Rejected ballots		11	0.4	▼0.1
Majority		893	30.1	▲7.7
Turnout		2,969	34.6	▲0.2
Registered electors		8,578		
Labour hold		Swing	▲19.1†	

†Swing to the Labour candidate from UKIP, who had stood last time this seat was contested.

=== Washington East Ward ===
Washington East Ward
Party	Candidate	Votes	%	±%
Labour	Tony Taylor*	1,561	50.1	▲8.8
Conservative	Hilary Johnson	1,123	36	▲10.1
Liberal Democrats	Siobhán Kelleher	233	7.5	▲2.7
Green	Josh Flynn	188	6	▲6
Rejected ballots		12	0.4	▼0.4
Majority		438	14.1	▼1
Turnout		3,117	34.4	▲0.1
Registered electors		9,063		
Labour hold		Swing	▲17.5†	

†Swing to the Labour candidate from UKIP, who had stood last time this seat was contested.

=== Washington North Ward ===
Washington North Ward
Party	Candidate	Votes	%	±%
Labour	Jill Fletcher*	1,514	62.9	▲4.2
Conservative	Carol Groombridge	443	18.4	▲10.7
Green	June Bradley	170	7.1	▲7.1
For Britain	Andrew Cox	156	6.5	▲6.5
Liberal Democrats	Carlton West	120	5	▲2.5
Rejected ballots		5	0.2	▼0.7
Majority		1,071	44.5	▲17
Turnout		2,408	29.7	▼0.9
Registered electors		8,106		
Labour hold		Swing	▲17.6†	

†Swing to the Labour candidate from UKIP, who had stood last time this seat was contested.

=== Washington South Ward ===
Washington South Ward
Party	Candidate	Votes	%	±%
Labour	Graeme Miller*	1,292	47.2	▲2.3
Conservative	Martin Talbot	978	35.7	▲14.4
Green	Dominic Armstrong	254	9.3	▲9.3
Liberal Democrats	Sean Terry	206	7.5	▲2.4
Rejected ballots		8	0.3	▼0.3
Majority		314	11.5	▼6.5
Turnout		2,738	35.1	▲1
Registered electors		7,794		
Labour hold		Swing	▲15.6†	

†Swing to the Labour candidate from UKIP, who had stood last time this seat was contested.

=== Washington West Ward ===
Washington West Ward
Party	Candidate	Votes	%	±%
Labour	Dorothy Trueman*	1,697	59.2	▲2.2
Conservative	Olwyn Bird	721	25.2	▲10.5
Green	Paul Leonard	274	9.5	▲9.5
Liberal Democrats	Kevin Morris	165	5.8	▲1.4
Rejected ballots		9	0.3	▼0.3
Majority		976	25.2	▼7.7
Turnout		2,866	32.1	▼0.3
Registered electors		8,924		
Labour hold		Swing	▲13.1†	

†Swing to the Labour candidate from UKIP, who had stood last time this seat was contested.

Preceded by 2016 Sunderland City Council election	Sunderland City Council elections	Succeeded by 2019 Sunderland City Council election
