= 2016 Sunderland City Council election =

2016 UK local government election

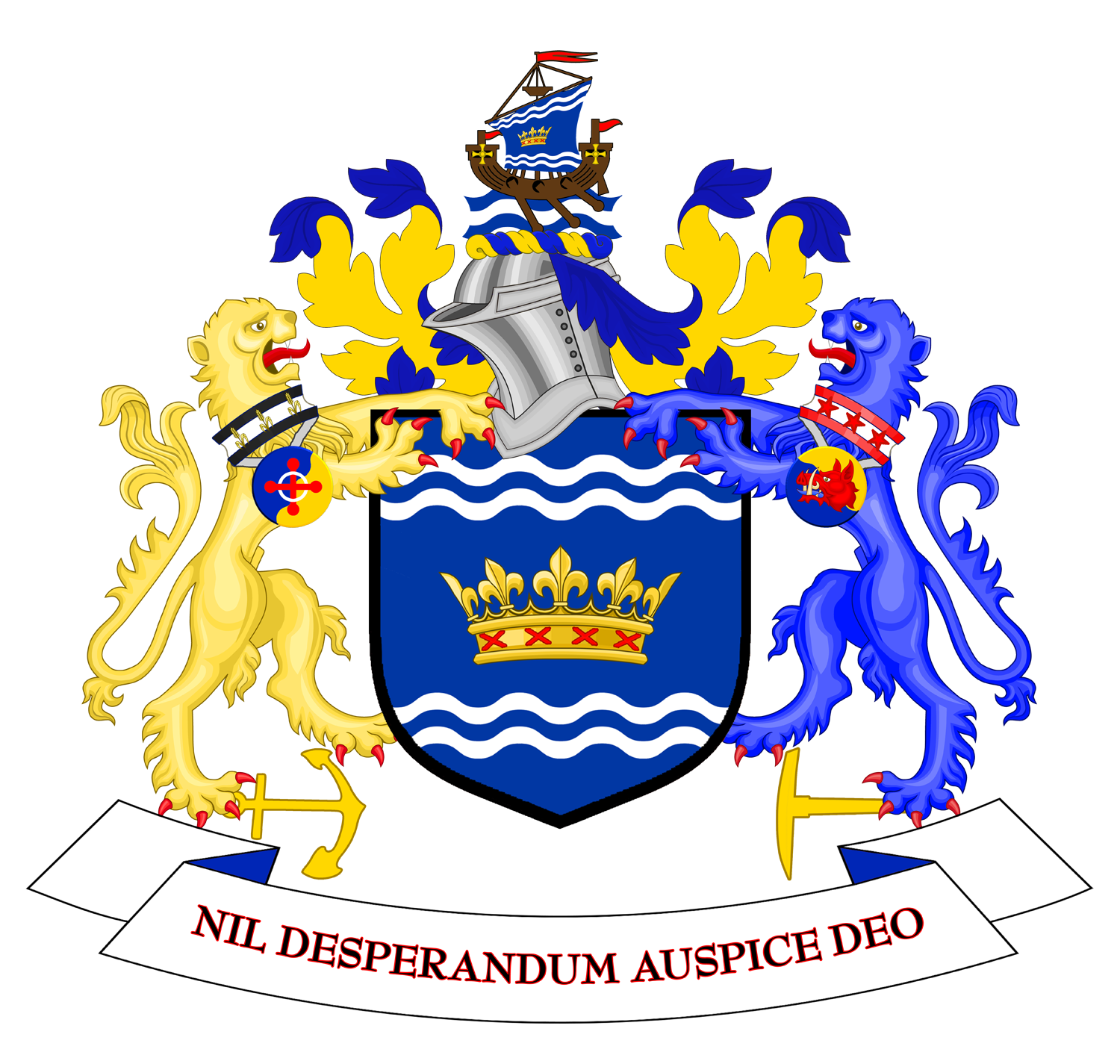
← 2015	5 May 2016	2018 →

One third of 75 seats on Sunderland City Council 38 seats needed for a majority
	First party	Second party	Third party
Party	Labour	Conservative	Liberal Democrats
Seats before	66	6	0
Seats won	22	2	1
Seats after	67	6	1
Seat change	▲1	Steady	▲1
	Fourth party
Party	Independent
Seats before	3
Seats won	0
Seats after	1
Seat change	▼2
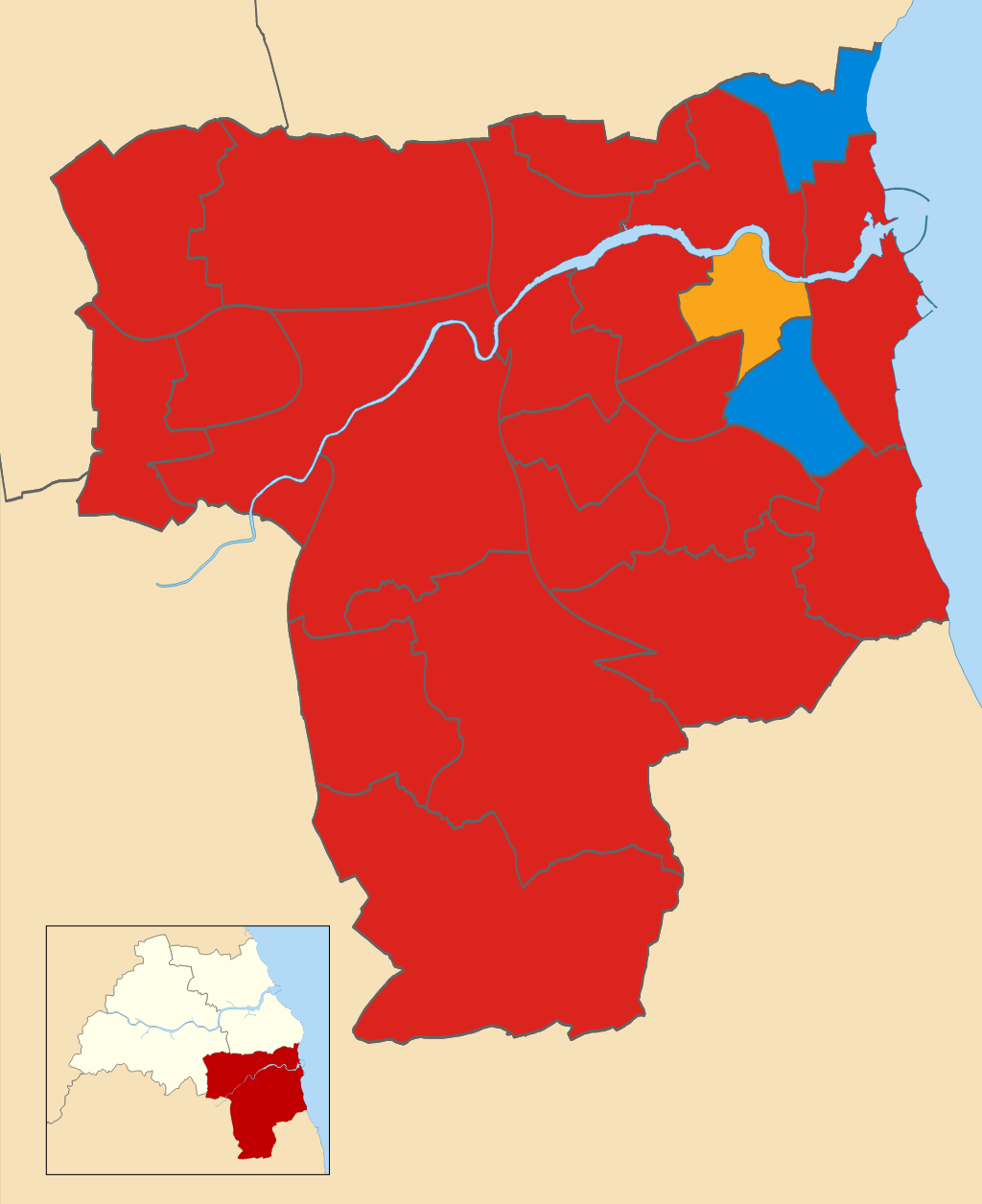
- Map of the 2016 Sunderland City Council election results. Labour in red, Conservatives in blue and Liberal Democrats in yellow.
Majority party before election
Labour
Majority party after election
Labour

The 2016 Sunderland City Council election took place on 5 May 2016 to elect one-third of the members of Sunderland City Council in England. This was on the same day as other local elections held across the United Kingdom.

== Election results ==
The election saw Labour gain two seats, taking the Houghton and Copt Hill wards after incumbent Independent councillors chose not to stand for re-election. The Conservatives held the seats they were defending in Fulwell and St Michael's. The Liberal Democrats took a seat from Labour in Millfield.

Sunderland local election result 2016
Party	Seats	Gains	Losses	Net gain/loss	Seats %	Votes %	Votes	+/−
Labour	22	2	1	▲1	88.0	54.0	35,905	▲4.4
Conservative	2	0	0	0	8.0	22.1	14,695	▼1.3
UKIP	0	0	0	0	0.0	11.3	7,522	▼8.2
Liberal Democrats	1	1	0	▲1	4.0	7.0	4,627	▲3.9
Green	0	0	0	0	0.0	4.0	2,640	▲0.5
Independent	0	0	0	0	0.0	1.1	703	▼2.0
North East	0	0	0	0	0.0	0.5	324	▲0.4
TUSC	0	0	0	0	0.0	0.2	116	▼0.2

This resulted in the following composition of the council:

Party	Previous Council	New Council
Labour	66	67
Conservatives	6	6
Liberal Democrats	0	1
Independent	1	1
Total	75	75
Working majority	59	59

== Ward by ward results ==
Asterisk denotes incumbent councillor.

=== Barnes ward ===
Barnes
Party	Candidate	Votes	%	±%
Labour	Rebecca Atkinson*	1,502	46.5	▼9
Conservative	Peter O'Connor	1,173	36.3	▼4.1
Independent	Alan Rinaldi	199	6.2	▲6.2
Liberal Democrats	Bailey Baker	179	5.5	▲1.4
Green	Caroline Robinson	157	4.9	▲4.9
Rejected ballots		23	0.7	
Majority		329	10.2	▼4.9
Turnout		3,233	38.4	▼2.4
Registered electors		8,417		
Labour hold		Swing	▼7.6	

=== Castle ward ===
Castle
Party	Candidate	Votes	%	±%
Labour	Denny Wilson*	1,665	77.3	▼8.8
Conservative	Grant Shearer	261	12.1	▲2.7
Liberal Democrats	Jack Stoker	187	8.7	▲4.2
Rejected ballots		41	1.9	
Majority		1,404	65.2	▼11.6
Turnout		2,154	26.0	▼0.7
Registered electors		8,284		
Labour hold		Swing	▼5.8	

=== Copt Hill ward ===
Copt Hill
Party	Candidate	Votes	%	±%
Labour	Kevin Johnston	1,577	53.2	▲12.1
UKIP	Reginald Coulson	847	28.6	▲28.6
Conservative	Pat Francis	339	11.4	▲11.4
Green	Daniel Olaman	181	6.1	▲6.1
Rejected ballots		18	0.6	
Majority		730	24.6	▲10.5
Turnout		2,962	34.1	▲0.5
Registered electors		8,676		
Labour gain from Independent		Swing	▲33.7†	

†The incumbent Independent councillor Derrick Smith retired at this election, and none of UKIP, the Conservatives, or the Greens had stood when the seat was last contested. The swing shown is to the Labour candidate from the Independent.

=== Doxford ward ===
Doxford
Party	Candidate	Votes	%	±%
Labour	Christine Marshall*	1,320	49.6	▼17.5
Conservative	Keith O'Brien	555	20.1	▼1.2
UKIP	Vincent Costello	528	19.9	▲19.9
Green	Rachel Featherstone	171	6.4	▲2.5
Liberal Democrats	Geoff Pryke	66	2.5	▼0.2
Rejected ballots		19	0.7	
Majority		765	29.4	▼16.5
Turnout		2,659	35.5	▲0.4
Registered electors		7,496		
Labour hold		Swing	▼18.7	

=== Fulwell ward ===
Fulwell
Party	Candidate	Votes	%	±%
Conservative	Robert Francis*	1,728	45.5	▼2.6
Labour	Ken Richardson	1,279	33.7	▼11.7
UKIP	Christopher Marshall	480	12.6	▲12.6
Liberal Democrats	Diana Talbott Matthew	161	4.2	▼2.3
Green	Peter Murray	136	3.6	▲3.6
Rejected ballots		16	0.4	
Majority		449	11.8	▲9
Turnout		3,800	42.6	▲2.6
Registered electors		8,906		
Conservative hold		Swing	▼7.6	

=== Hendon ward ===
Hendon
Party	Candidate	Votes	%	±%
Labour Co-op	Michael Mordey*	1,376	64.2	▼2.4
Conservative	Syed Ali	429	20.1	▲4.3
Green	Helmut Izaks	156	7.3	▲0.3
Liberal Democrats	Callum James Littlemore	155	7.2	▲7.2
Rejected ballots		26	1.2	
Majority		947	44.2	▼6.6
Turnout		2,142	27.9	▲2.3
Registered electors		7,681		
Labour hold		Swing	▼3.4	

=== Hetton ward ===
Hetton
Party	Candidate	Votes	%	±%
Labour	Jim Blackburn*	1,531	51.4	▼0.4
UKIP	John Defty	1,037	34.8	▼8.5
Conservative	Douglas Middlemiss	159	5.3	▲5.3
Independent	David Geddis	135	4.5	▲4.5
Liberal Democrats	Phillip Dowell	92	3.1	▼1.8
Rejected ballots		24	0.8	
Majority		494	16.6	▲8.2
Turnout		2,978	34.6	▼0.5
Registered electors		8,618		
Labour hold		Swing	▼2.9†	

†Swing away from Labour to the Conservatives, who had stood aside last time this seat was contested.

=== Houghton ward ===
Houghton
Party	Candidate	Votes	%	±%
Labour	Alex Scullion	1,607	56.2	▲10.4
UKIP	Anthony Holt	641	22.4	▲22.4
Independent	Mick Watson	369	12.9	▲12.9
Conservative	George Brown	229	8.0	▲8
Rejected ballots		14	0.5	
Majority		966	33.8	▲27.6
Turnout		2,860	31.7	▼4.1
Registered electors		9,012		
Labour hold		Swing	▲31.2†	

†The incumbent Independent councillor Sheila Ellis retired at this election, and neither UKIP, the Conservatives, or Mick Watson had stood when the seat was last contested. The swing shown is to the Labour candidate from the previous Independent.

=== Millfield ward ===
Millfield
Party	Candidate	Votes	%	±%
Liberal Democrats	Niall Hodson	1,588	59.7	▲21.5
Labour	Bob Price*	838	31.5	▼14
Conservative	Gwennyth Gibson	143	5.4	▼1.7
Green	Lucky Pemu	71	2.7	▼1.3
Rejected ballots		19	0.7	
Majority		750	28.2	▲20.9
Turnout		2,659	38.4	▲9.6
Registered electors		6,951		
Liberal Democrats gain from Labour		Swing	▲17.8	

=== Pallion ward ===
Pallion
Party	Candidate	Votes	%	±%
Labour	Amy Wilson*	1,046	50.2	▼16.5
UKIP	Ian Pallace	596	28.6	▲28.6
Conservative	Philip Young	261	12.5	▼3.3
Liberal Democrats	Conor Sutton	91	4.4	0
Green	Alan Robinson	71	3.4	▼9.8
Rejected ballots		19	0.9	
Majority		450	21.6	▼29.3
Turnout		2,084	29	▼1.4
Registered electors		7,175		
Labour hold		Swing	▼22.6	

=== Redhill ward ===
Redhill
Party	Candidate	Votes	%	±%
Labour Co-op	Ronny Davison*	1,409	69.1	▼9.5
North East	Heather Fagan	324	15.9	▲15.9
Conservative	Shaun Cudworth	163	12.5	▲7.3
Green	Edward Robinson	67	3.3	▲3.3
Liberal Democrats	Steve Thomas	59	2.9	▲2.9
Rejected ballots		18	0.1	
Majority		1,085	53.2	▼9.3
Turnout		2,040	25.6	▼2.4
Labour hold		Swing	▼12.7	

=== Ryhope ward ===
Ryhope
Party	Candidate	Votes	%	±%
Labour	Paula Hunt	1,572	64.7	▼8.1
Conservative	Andrei Lucaci	462	19	▼8.2
Green	Emma Robson	247	10.2	▲10.2
Liberal Democrats	Anthony Usher	121	5	▲5
Rejected ballots		26	1.1	
Majority		1,110	45.7	▲0.1
Turnout		2,428	30.7	▼1.2
Labour hold		Swing	▼9.2	

=== Sandhill ward ===
Sandhill
Party	Candidate	Votes	%	±%
Labour	Debra Waller*	1,229	50.6	▼39.8
UKIP	Bryan Foster	579	25.8	▲25.8
Conservative	Christine Reed	277	12.3	▼10.5
Liberal Democrats	Susan Wilson	90	4.0	▼12.6
Green	Jonathan Hume	59	2.6	▲2.6
Rejected ballots		14	0.6	
Majority		650	28.9	▼18.8
Turnout		2,248	28.6	▲4.8
Labour hold		Swing	▼32.8	

=== Shiney Row ward ===
Shiney Row
Party	Candidate	Votes	%	±%
Labour	Anne Lawson*	1,733	55.7	▼17.9
UKIP	Richard Elvin	740	23.8	▲23.8
Conservative	Sally Oliver	456	14.6	▼5.8
Liberal Democrats	Sean Terry	88	2.8	▼3.2
Green	Polly Robinson	74	2.4	▲2.4
Rejected ballots		20	0.6	
Majority		993	31.9	▼21.2
Turnout		3111	32.4	▲1.6
Labour hold		Swing	▼20.9	

=== Silksworth ward ===
Silksworth
Party	Candidate	Votes	%	±%
Labour	Patricia Smith*	1,405	51.1	▼16.1
UKIP	Alan Davies	649	23.6	▲10.7
Conservative	Bryan Reynolds	458	16.6	▲1.1
Green	Chris Crozier	146	5.3	▲0.9
Liberal Democrats	Paul Edgeworth	83	3	▲3
Rejected ballots		10	0.4	
Majority		756	27.5	▼24.3
Turnout		2,751	34.2	▼0.1
Labour hold		Swing	▼13.4	

=== Southwick ward ===
Southwick
Party	Candidate	Votes	%	±%
Labour	Kelly Chequer	1,430	60.5	▼5.9
UKIP	Sandy Taylor	426	18	▲4.4
Conservative	Neville Chamberlin	352	14.9	▼1.6
Liberal Democrats	Stephen O'Brien	80	3.4	0
Green	David Lawson	61	2.6	▲2.6
Rejected ballots		16	0.7	
Majority		1004	42.5	▼7.4
Turnout		2,365	29.8	▲1.2
Labour hold		Swing	▼5.2	

=== St Anne's ward ===
St Anne's
Party	Candidate	Votes	%	±%
Labour	Susan Watson*	1,371	70.2	▼1.9
Conservative	Tony Morrisey	548	28.1	▲14.1
Rejected ballots		33	1.7	
Majority		823	42.5	▼15.5
Turnout		1952	24.3	▼3.7
Labour hold		Swing	▼8	

=== St Chad's ward ===
St Chad's
Party	Candidate	Votes	%	±%
Labour	Darryl Dixon*	1,188	41.2	▼14.1
Conservative	Dominic McDonough	978	34.5	▼6.9
UKIP	Joshua Green	448	15.8	▲15.8
Liberal Democrats	Margaret Crosby	132	4.7	▲1.4
Green	Richard Bradley	68	2.4	▲1.4
Rejected ballots		19	0.7	
Majority		210	6.7	▼7.3
Turnout		2833	37.9	▼2.1
Labour hold		Swing	▼15	

=== St Michael's ward ===
St Michael's
Party	Candidate	Votes	%	±%
Conservative	Robert Oliver	1,675	52.1	▲0.8
Labour Co-op	Zaf Iqbal	996	31.4	▼4.7
Green	John Appleton	242	7.6	▼0.6
Liberal Democrats	Andrew Wood	237	7.5	▲3.1
Rejected ballots		19	0.6	
Majority		679	20.7	▲5.5
Turnout		3169	38.5	▲3.1
Conservative hold		Swing	▲2.8	

=== St Peter's ward ===
St Peter's
Party	Candidate	Votes	%	±%
Labour	Julia Jackson*	1,405	45.4	▼7.1
Conservative	Geoffrey Scott	1215	39.3	▼0.9
Liberal Democrats	John Lennox	260	8.4	▲1
Green	Michal Chantkowski	184	6.0	▲6
Rejected ballots		33	1.0	
Majority		190	6.1	▼6.2
Turnout		2833	37.9	▲2.7
Labour hold		Swing	▼6.6	

=== Washington Central ward ===
Washington Central
Party	Candidate	Votes	%	±%
Labour	Dianne Snowdon*	1,994	69.4	▼3.7
Conservative	Grace Hanson-Eden	503	17.5	▲6.7
Liberal Democrats	Anne Griffin	345	12	▲6.1
Rejected ballots		31	1.1	
Majority		1491	51.9	▲3.8
Turnout		2873	33.6	▼0.3
Labour hold		Swing	▼5.2	

=== Washington East ward ===
Washington East
Party	Candidate	Votes	%	±%
Labour Co-op	David Snowdon*	1,508	52.1	▼4.4
Conservative	Hilary Johnson	842	29.6	▲5.5
Liberal Democrats	Irene Bannister	183	6.4	▲2.5
Green	Anthony Murphy	180	6.3	▲1.2
TUSC	Wilf Laws	116	4.1	▲4.1
Rejected ballots		18	0.6	
Majority		666	22.5	▼9.9
Turnout		2847	32.4	▼2.2
Labour hold		Swing	▼5	

=== Washington North ward ===
Washington North
Party	Candidate	Votes	%	±%
Labour	John Kelly*	1,709	71.2	▼8.9
Conservative	Andrew Gray	373	15.7	▲2
Green	June Bradley	266	11.2	▲11.2
Rejected ballots		26	1.1	
Majority		1336	55.5	▼10.9
Turnout		2374	29.5	▲0.5
Labour hold		Swing	▼5.5	

=== Washington South ward ===
Washington South
Party	Candidate	Votes	%	±%
Labour	Louise Farthing*	1,523	59.1	▼6
Conservative	Martin Talbot	732	28.4	▲1
Liberal Democrats	David Griffin	294	11.4	▲3.8
Rejected ballots		27	1.0	
Majority		791	30.7	▼7.1
Turnout		2576	33.2	▼0.7
Labour hold		Swing	▼3.5	

=== Washington West ward ===
Washington West
Party	Candidate	Votes	%	±%
Labour	Bernie Scaplehorn*	1,692	58.8	▼18.7
UKIP	Lynn O'Neil	551	19.1	▲19.1
Conservative	Olwyn Bird	384	13.3	▼0.3
Liberal Democrats	Jo Thomas	136	4.7	▼4.2
Green	Benjamin Wells	103	3.6	▲3.6
Rejected ballots		13	0.5	
Majority		39.7	1141	▼24.2
Turnout		2879	32.5	▲1
Labour hold		Swing	▼18.9	

Preceded by 2015 Sunderland City Council election	Sunderland City Council elections	Succeeded by 2018 Sunderland City Council election
