= Pallion =

Coordinates: 54.904183°N 1.415503°W

- Location within Tyne and Wear
- Population: 10,117 (2011.ward)
- Metropolitan borough: City of Sunderland
- Metropolitan county: Tyne and Wear
- Region: North East
- Country: England
- Sovereign state: United Kingdom
- Post town: SUNDERLAND
- Postcode district: SR4
- Dialling code: 0191
- Police: Northumbria
- Fire: Tyne and Wear
- Ambulance: North East
- UK Parliament: Sunderland Central

Pallion is a suburb and electoral ward in North West Sunderland, in Tyne and Wear, England. Most of the buildings in the area were built during the Victorian Era and consist of large terraced houses built for shipbuilders, but also smaller one-storey cottages in other areas for local workers (the shipyard industry has now long gone).

== History ==
The place-name 'Pallion' is first attested in 1328, where it appears as le Pavylion. This is a French name meaning 'the Pavilion'.

On the edge of the parish (on the bank of the River Wear) once stood Pallion Hall, the childhood home of Sir Joseph Swan, developer of the lightbulb. The house was demolished in 1901. Near this part of the area is a retail park, Pallion Metro station and an industrial estate. The new Northern Spire Bridge crosses the Wear just to the east of here.

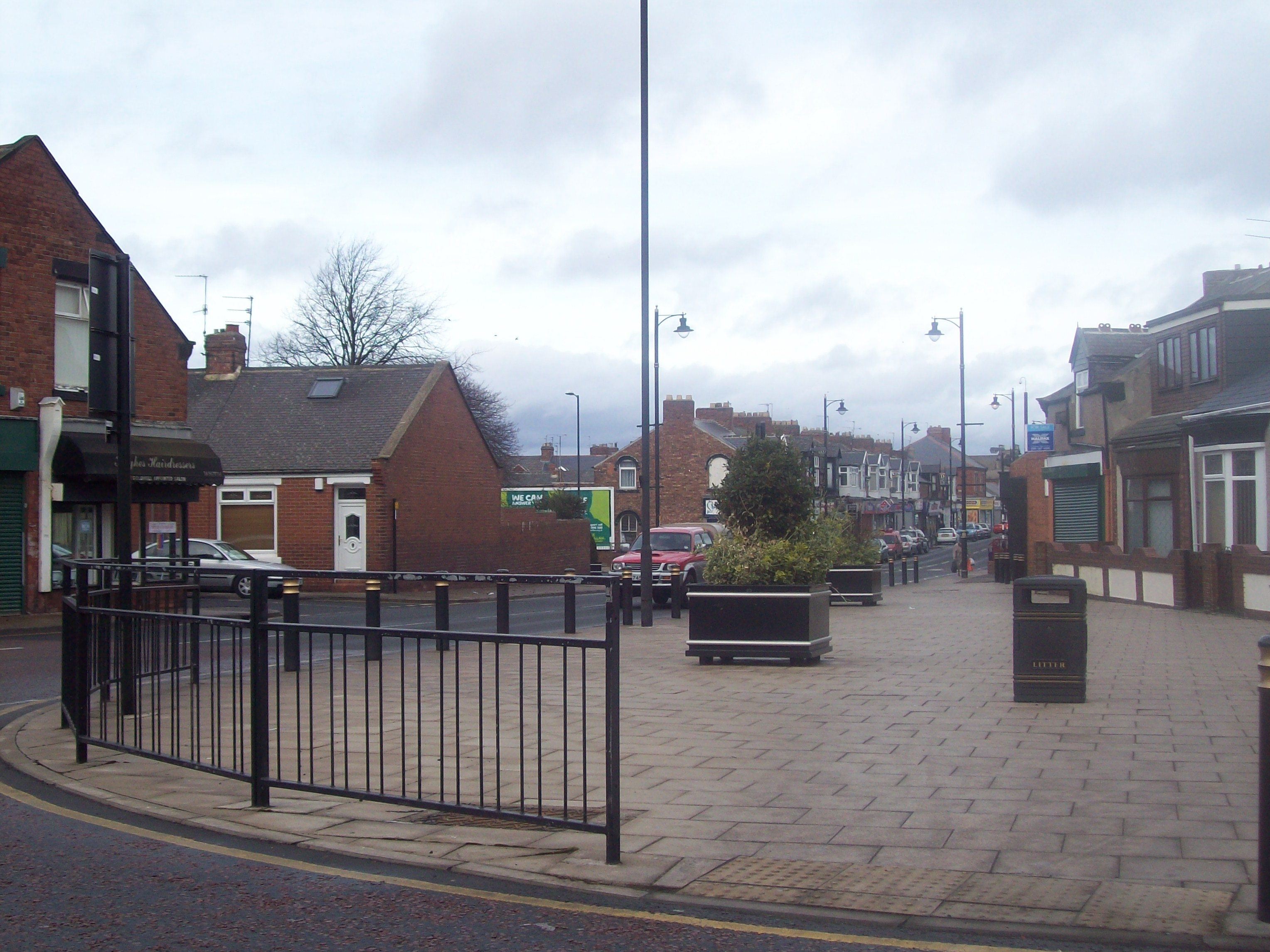
St Luke's Terrace, the main shopping area of Pallion.

Pallion was also the home of the infamous New Monkey club, which had shaped rave culture in the North East. The club was shut down in 2006 after a drugs raid where there were 18 arrests. 165 officers stormed the club, later the club was forced to shut down.

The electoral ward of Pallion was a safe seat for the Labour Party from its creation in the 1970s until early 2018, when it was won by Liberal Democrat campaigner Martin Haswell. Pallion's ethnicity is very similar to the Sunderland average.

== Shipbuilding ==
In 1672 the Goodchilds of Pallion, a local landowning family, built small ships to transport lime produced in their kilns. In 1857, William Doxford moved his shipbuilding yard from Cox Green to Pallion and in 1864 began building iron ships In 1869, Short Brothers of Sunderland moved their shipyard to Pallion. In 1883, Doxfords built four steel ships Short Brothers of Sunderland shipyard at Pallion was closed in 1964 with the loss of 300 jobs and was subsequently demolished

== Sources ==
- Clark, Andrew (2002). The People's History - Sunderland Shipyards. Seaham: The People's History Ltd. ISBN 1-902527-00-3.
- Dodds, Glen Lyndon (2011). A History of Sunderland (Third ed.). Sunderland: Albion Press. ISBN 978-0-9525122-2-6.
