= Millfield Metro station =

Tyne and Wear Metro station in Sunderland

Millfield
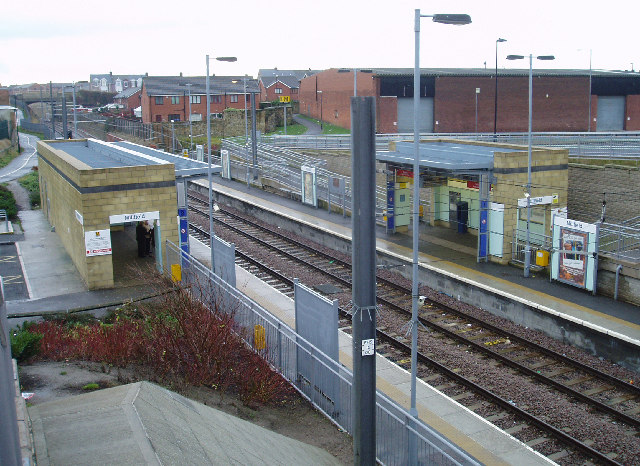

General information
- Location: Millfield, City of Sunderland; England
- Coordinates: 54°54′23″N 1°24′04″W
- Grid reference: NZ385571
- System: Tyne and Wear Metro station
- Transit authority: Tyne and Wear PTE
- Platforms: 2
- Tracks: 2

Construction
- Parking: 12 spaces
- Cycle facilities: 5 cycle pods
- Accessible: Step-free access to platform

Other information
- Station code: MLF
- Fare zone: C

History
- Original company: York, Newcastle and Berwick Railway
- Pre-grouping: North Eastern Railway
- Post-grouping: London and North Eastern Railway; British Rail (Eastern Region)

Key dates
- 1 June 1853: Opened
- 1890: Resited
- 2 May 1955: Closed
- 31 March 2002: Reopened

Passengers
- 2024/25: 0.446 million

Services
Preceding station	Tyne and Wear Metro	Following station
Pallion towards South Hylton	Green line	University towards Airport
Location
- Location within Sunderland Location within Tyne and Wear

Millfield is a Tyne and Wear Metro station, serving Sunderland Royal Hospital and the suburb of Millfield, in the City of Sunderland in Tyne and Wear, England. It joined the network on 31 March 2002, following the opening of the extension from Pelaw to South Hylton.

== Original station ==
The old station opened in June 1853, before being closed, and re-sited to the north west of Hylton Road in around 1890. The second station closed in May 1955, ahead of the closure of other nearby stations, with Pallion and Hylton closing in May 1964, following the Beeching Axe. Goods facilities remained at Millfield until the late 1970s.

== Metro era ==
Between Millfield and Pallion, it was necessary for the Tyne and Wear Metro route to deviate from the original alignment, owing to the construction of a road. A new trackbed was cut in to a steep slope, and extensively retained with piling, along with the construction of a new road bridge.

Along with other stations on the line between Fellgate and South Hylton, the station is fitted with vitreous enamel panels designed by artist, Morag Morrison. Each station uses a different arrangement of colours, with strong colours used in platform shelters and ticketing areas, and a more neutral palette for external elements.

The station was used by 203,654 passengers in 2017–18, making it the third-least-used station on the Wearside extension, after Pallion (92,060) and St. Peter's (107,887).

== Facilities ==
Step-free access is available at all stations across the Tyne and Wear Metro network, with ramped access to both platforms at Millfield. The station is equipped with ticket machines, waiting shelter, seating, next train information displays, timetable posters, and an emergency help point on both platforms. Ticket machines are able to accept payment with credit and debit card (including contactless payment), notes and coins. The station is also fitted with smartcard validators, which feature at all stations across the network.

There is car parking available, with 12 on-street parking bays located off Hylton Road, as well as two accessible parking spaces. There is also the provision for cycle parking, with four cycle pods available for use.

== Services ==
As of April 2021, the station is served by up to five trains per hour on weekdays and Saturday, and up to four trains per hour during the evening and on Sunday.
