= Pallion Metro station =

Tyne and Wear Metro station in Sunderland

Pallion
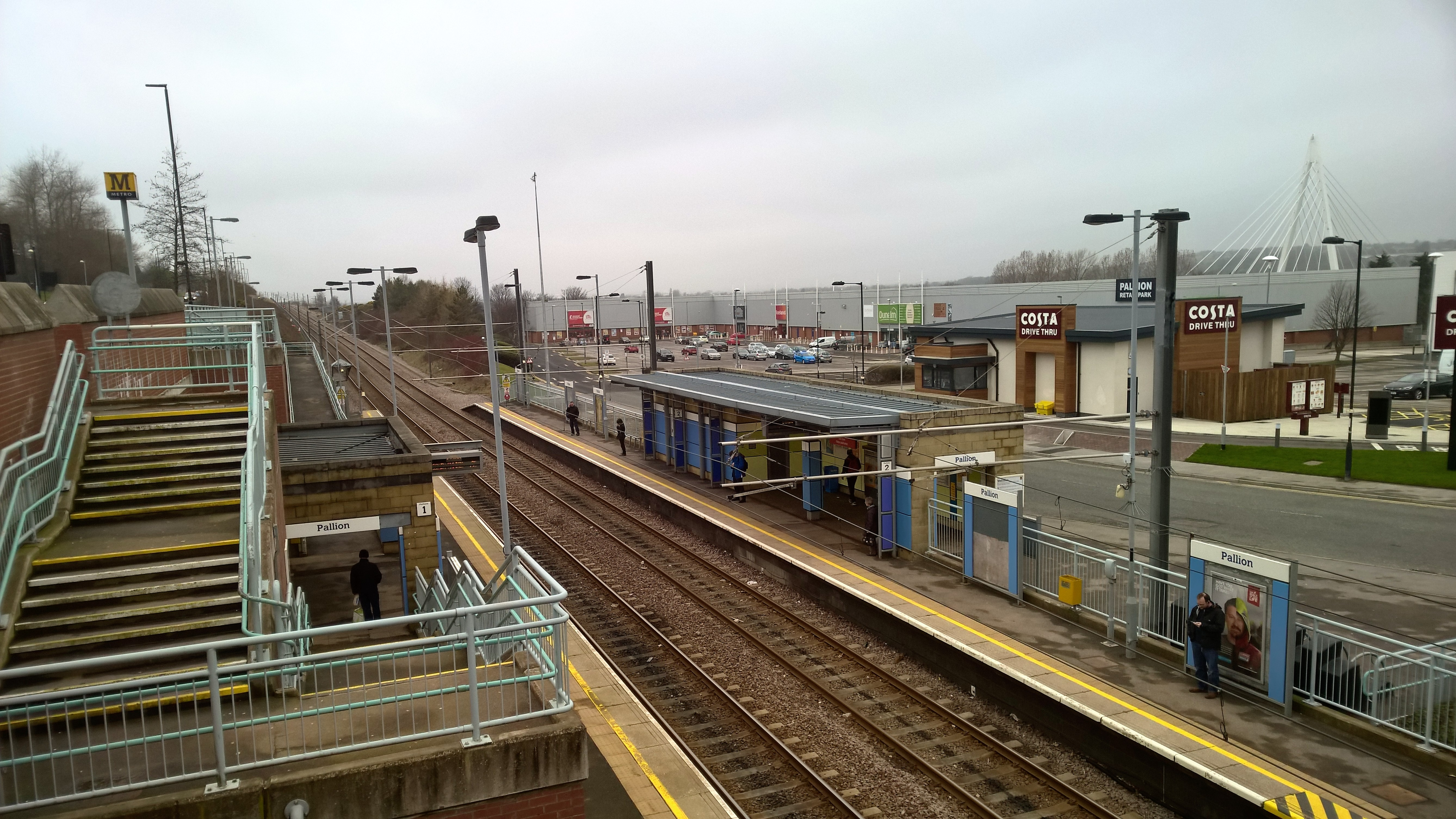

General information
- Location: Pallion, City of Sunderland; England
- Coordinates: 54°54′46″N 1°25′04″W
- Grid reference: NZ374576
- System: Tyne and Wear Metro station
- Transit authority: Tyne and Wear PTE
- Platforms: 2
- Tracks: 2

Construction
- Cycle facilities: 5 cycle pods
- Accessible: Step-free access to platform

Other information
- Station code: PAL
- Fare zone: C

History
- Original company: York, Newcastle and Berwick Railway
- Pre-grouping: North Eastern Railway
- Post-grouping: London and North Eastern Railway; British Rail (Eastern Region)

Key dates
- 1 June 1853: Opened
- 4 May 1964: Closed
- 31 March 2002: Resited and reopened

Passengers
- 2024/25: 0.258 million

Services
Preceding station	Tyne and Wear Metro	Following station
South Hylton Terminus	Green line	Millfield towards Airport
Location
- Location within Sunderland Location within Tyne and Wear

Pallion is a Tyne and Wear Metro station, serving the suburb of Pallion, City of Sunderland in Tyne and Wear, England. It joined the network on 31 March 2002, following the opening of the Wearside extension – a project costing in the region of £100 million. The station was used by around 258,000 passengers in 2024–25, making it the least-used station on the network.

== Original station ==
The old station opened in June 1853, as part of the Penshaw branch of the York, Newcastle and Berwick Railway. Following the Beeching Axe, the line was closed, with the station being closed to passengers in May 1964, along with Hylton, and to goods in July 1965. At nearby Millfield, passenger service was withdrawn in May 1955, with goods facilities remaining until the late 1970s.

== Metro era ==
The current station is located about 150 m (490 ft) north of the former Pallion station. Between Pallion and Millfield, it was necessary for the Tyne and Wear Metro route to deviate from the original alignment, owing to the construction of a road. A new trackbed was cut in to a steep slope, and extensively retained with piling, along with the construction of a new road bridge.

Along with other stations on the line between Fellgate and South Hylton, the station is fitted with vitreous enamel panels designed by artist Morag Morrison. Each station uses a different arrangement of colours, with strong colours used in platform shelters and ticketing areas, and a more neutral palate for external elements.

Pallion is the nearest station to the Northern Spire, a 336 m (1,102 ft) bridge over the River Wear, which is located about 400 m (0.25 miles) to the north of the station.

The station was used by around 258,000 passengers in 2024–25, making it the least-used station on the network, followed closely by St. Peter's (264,000 passengers) and Hadrian Road (269,000 passengers)

== Facilities ==
Step-free access is available at all stations across the Tyne and Wear Metro network, with ramped access to both platforms at Pallion. The station is equipped with ticket machines, waiting shelter, seating, next train information displays, timetable posters, and an emergency help point on both platforms. Ticket machines are able to accept payment with credit and debit card (including contactless payment), notes and coins. The station is also fitted with smartcard validators, which feature at all stations across the network.

There is no dedicated car parking available at the station. There is the provision for cycle parking, with five cycle pods available for use.

== Services ==
As of April 2021, the station is served by up to five trains per hour on weekdays and Saturday, and up to four trains per hour during the evening and on Sunday.
