= 2019 Sunderland City Council election =

2019 UK local government election

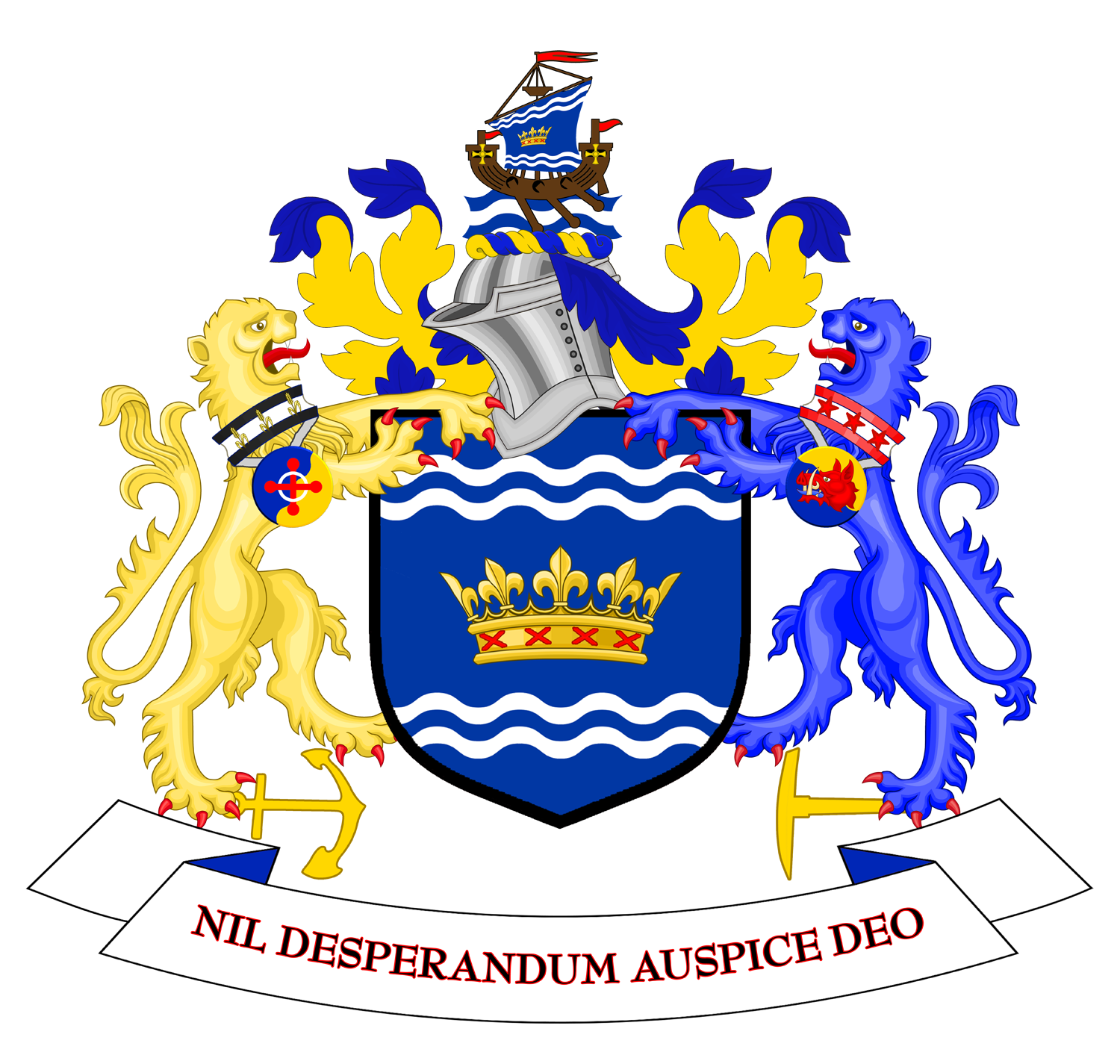
- 2 May 2019

One third of 75 seats on Sunderland City Council, plus a vacancy in Sandhill Ward 38 seats needed for a majority
	First party	Second party	Third party
Party	Labour	Conservative	Liberal Democrats
Seats before	61	8	5
Seats won	12	5	5
Seats after	51	12	8
Seat change	▼10	▲4	▲3
	Fourth party	Fifth party
Party	UKIP	Green
Seats before	0	0
Seats won	3	1
Seats after	3	1
Seat change	▲3	▲1
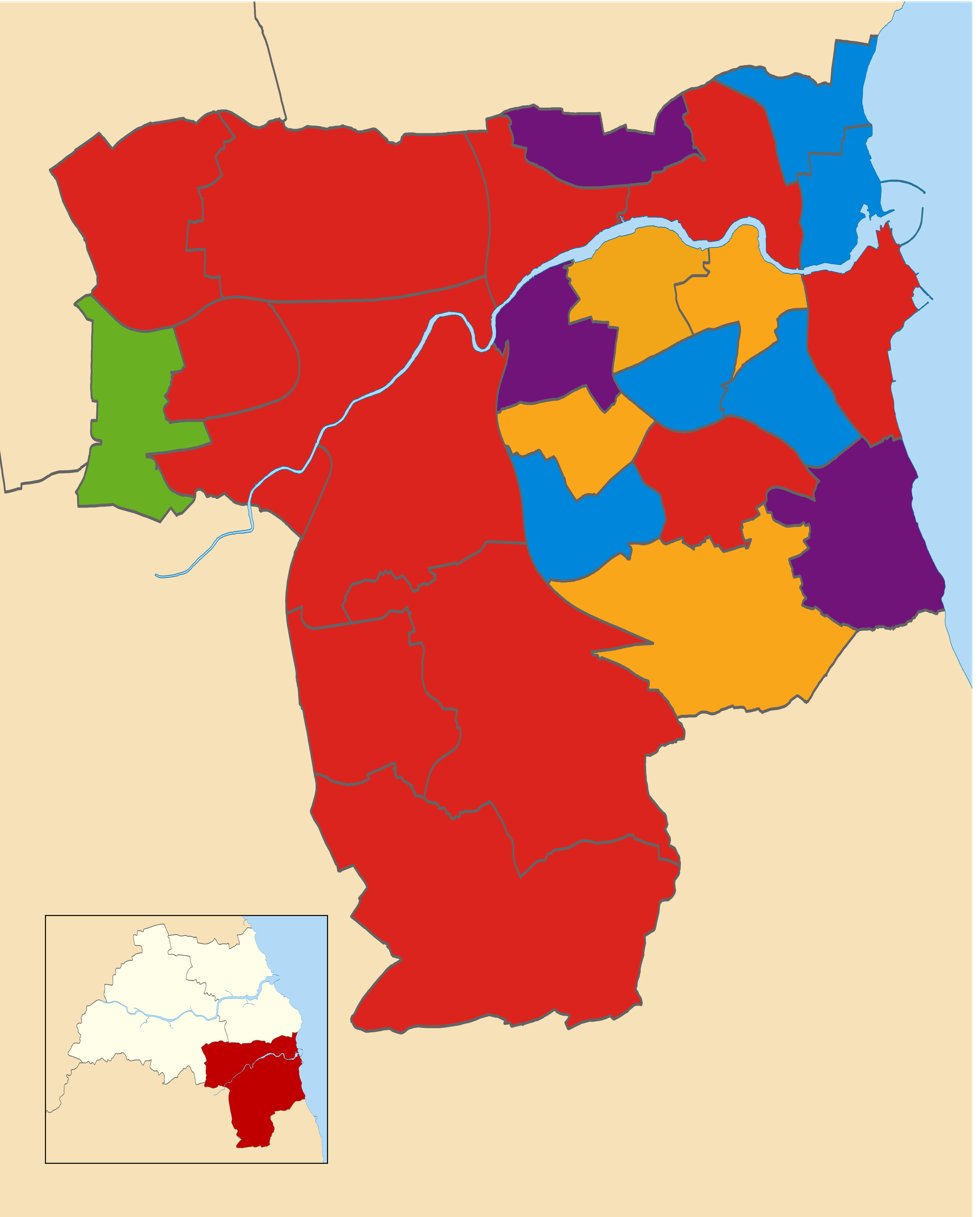
- Map of the 2019 Sunderland City Council election results. Labour in red, Conservatives in blue, Liberal Democrats in yellow, UKIP in purple and Green Party in green.
Majority party before election
Labour
Majority party after election
Labour

The 2019 Sunderland City Council election took place on 2 May 2019 to elect members of Sunderland City Council in England. The election took place on the same day as other local elections.

== Background ==
There had been no by-elections on the Council since the 2018 local elections. However, two Liberal Democrat councillors who had won by-elections in 2017 and 2018 were seeking re-election. Also, a Liberal Democrat councillor had stepped down prior to the elections, resulting in a two-seat contest in the Sandhill Ward.

Sitting St Chad's councillor and former mayor Stuart Porthouse was unable to stand for re-election, having been suspended from the Labour Party ahead of the election, after sharing a post online about anti-Semitism. In Washington, a former Labour councillor had resigned having been expelled from the Labour Party after pleading guilty to attempting to sexually communicate with a child.

The Labour Party, Conservatives and UKIP all fielded 25 candidates in the election. The Liberal Democrats fielded 19 candidates, and the Greens 24. In addition, there were 4 Independent candidates, 3 Populist Party candidates, and one each from For Britain and the Democrats and Veterans.

== Election results ==
The election saw Labour defend 12 seats and lose 10. The Conservatives held the seat they were defending in St Michael's, and gained from Labour in Fulwell, St Peter's, St Chad's and Barnes. The Liberal Democrats defended their seat in Pallion and one seat in Sandhill, they gained a second seat in Sandhill and gained seats in Millfield and Doxford. UKIP won their first ever seats on Sunderland City Council, taking the Ryhope, St Anne's and Redhill wards from Labour. In a close result, the Greens also gained their first seat, taking Washington South from Labour by 3 votes.

Following the elections, Graeme Miller, the Labour leader of the Council, blamed his Party's fortunes on their Brexit stance, warning "We need to think carefully about what Brexit has done here, people have voted against the Labour Party on that."

The election result was the worst for the Labour Party in Sunderland since the Council was set up in 1973, although they had previously lost 9 councillors in the 1982 local elections. It was the Conservatives' best result since 2011, and the best result for the Liberal Democrats since 1982 (when they stood as the SDP/Liberal Alliance).

Sunderland local election result 2019
Party	Seats	Gains	Losses	Net gain/loss	Seats %	Votes %	Votes	+/−
Labour	12	0	10	▼10	46.1	32.7	23,999	▼14.3
UKIP	3	3	0	▲3	11.5	23.9	17,541	▲23.9
Conservative	5	4	0	▲4	19.2	18.7	13,758	▼10.6
Liberal Democrats	5	4	0	▲4	19.2	13.7	10,090	▲1.6
Green	1	0	0	▲1	4.0	8.0	5,853	▲1.9
Independent	0	0	0	0	0.0	1.9	1,425	▼2.2
Populist	0	0	0	0	0.0	0.8	593	▲0.2
Democrats and Veterans	0	0	0	0	0.0	0.2	208	▲0.2
For Britain	0	0	0	0	0.0	0.0	33	▼0.2

== Council composition ==
In the last council, the composition of the council was:

↓
61	8	6
Labour	Conservative	Lib; Dem

After the election, the composition of the council was:

↓
51	12	8	3	1
Labour	Conservative	Lib; Dem	UKIP	G

Lib Dem - Liberal Democrats
G - Greens

== Ward by ward results ==
Asterisk denotes incumbent councillor.

% Change from 2018

=== Barnes Ward ===
Barnes Ward
Party	Candidate	Votes	%	±%
Conservative	Helen Greener	1,216	36.2	▼8.9
Labour	Ian Galbraith*	1,009	30.0	▼5.8
UKIP	Allison Allen	479	14.3	▲14.3 new
Liberal Democrats	Tim Ellis	430	12.8	▲0.3
Green	Josh Flynn	225	6.6	▼0.2
Rejected ballots		12	0.4	
Majority		207	6	
Turnout		3,371	40.1	
Registered electors		8,383		
Conservative gain from Labour		Swing		

=== Castle Ward ===
Castle Ward
Party	Candidate	Votes	%	±%
Labour	Stephen Foster*	1,077	48.3	▼14.7
UKIP	Linda Hudson	908	40.7	▲40.7 new
Conservative	Bryan Reynolds	244	10.9	▼9.2
Rejected ballots		15	0.7	
Majority		169	7.5	
Turnout		2,244	27.2	
Registered electors		8,238		
Labour hold		Swing		

=== Copt Hill Ward ===
Copt Hill Ward
Party	Candidate	Votes	%	±%
Labour	Melanie Thornton	1,232	41.1	▼7.5
UKIP	Reg Coulson	1,047	35.2	▲35.2 new
Conservative	Pat Francis	386	13.0	▼1.8
Green	Esme Featherstone	311	10.5	▲6.8
Rejected ballots		21	0.7	
Majority		185	6.2	
Turnout		2,997	33.7	
Registered electors		8,903		
Labour hold		Swing		

=== Doxford Ward ===
Doxford Ward
Party	Candidate	Votes	%	±%
Liberal Democrats	Heather Fagan	1,337	42.7	▲34.8
Labour	Colin English*	730	23.3	▼35.1
UKIP	John Defty	518	16.5	▲16.5 new
Conservative	John Wiper	394	12.6	▼43
Green	Richard Bradley	150	4.8	▼4.9
Rejected ballots		17	0.5	
Majority		607	19.3	
Turnout		3,146	40.8	
Registered electors		7,706		
Liberal Democrats gain from Labour		Swing		

=== Fulwell Ward ===
Fulwell Ward
Party	Candidate	Votes	%	±%
Conservative	James Doyle	1,235	30.7	▼15.9
Labour	Margaret Beck*	1,170	29.1	▼4
Liberal Democrats	Malcolm Bond	789	19.6	▲3.4
UKIP	Tracey Hull	570	14.2	▲14.2 new
Green	Robert Welsh	260	6.5	▲2.4
Rejected ballots		19	0.5	
Majority		65	1.6	
Turnout		4,043	45.3	
Registered electors		8,928		
Conservative gain from Labour		Swing		

=== Hendon Ward ===
Hendon Ward
Party	Candidate	Votes	%	±%
Labour	Lynda Scanlan	817	37.1	▼10.3
UKIP	Martin Moore	581	26.3	▲26.3 new
Conservative	George Brown	280	12.7	▼6.7
Independent	Kristian Brown	204	9.3	▲9.3 new
Green	Gary Ogle	189	8.6	▲4.4
Liberal Democrats	Thomas Crawford	134	6.1	▼0.1
Rejected ballots		7	0.3	
Majority		236	10.7	
Turnout		2,212	28.3	
Registered electors		7,808		
Labour hold		Swing		

=== Hetton Ward ===
Hetton Ward
Party	Candidate	Votes	%	±%
Labour	Doris Turner*	990	33.2	▼20.1
UKIP	Michael Hopper	854	28.7	▲28.7 new
Independent	David Geddis	642	21.6	▼7.2
Democrats and Veterans	Glyn Dixon	208	7	▲7 new
Conservative	Neville Chamberlin	168	5.7	▼7.2
Green	Rachel Lowe	111	3.7	▲1
Rejected ballots		16	0.5	
Majority		136	4.6	
Turnout		2,989	32.8	
Registered electors		9,112		
Labour hold		Swing		

=== Houghton Ward ===
Houghton Ward
Party	Candidate	Votes	%	±%
Labour	Juliana Heron*	1,293	40.4	▼13.8
UKIP	Sheila Quigley	1,116	34.9	▲34.9 new
Conservative	Raymond Davison	313	9.8	▼5.5
Green	Chris Crozier	256	8	▲5.4
Independent	Mick Watson	217	6.8	▲6.8 new
Rejected ballots		4	0.1	
Majority		177	5.5	
Turnout		3,199	33	
Registered electors		9,708		
Labour hold		Swing		

=== Millfield Ward ===
Millfield Ward
Party	Candidate	Votes	%	±%
Liberal Democrats	Julia Potts	1,550	60.7	▲2.7
Labour	Thomas Newton	593	23.2	▼10
UKIP	Paul Holt	216	8.5	▲8.5 new
Conservative	Syed Ali	94	3.7	▼2.2
Green	Helmut Izaks	67	2.6	▼0.2
For Britain	Joe Cobb	33	1.3	▲1.3 new
Rejected ballots		8	0.3	
Majority		957	37.4	
Turnout		2,561	36	
Registered electors		7,111		
Liberal Democrats gain from Labour		Swing		

=== Pallion Ward ===
Pallion Ward
Party	Candidate	Votes	%	±%
Liberal Democrats	Martin Haswell*	1,662	63.7	▲3.6
Labour	Richard Mulvaney	436	16.7	▼12.7
UKIP	Michael Gutowski	340	13.0	▲13.0 new
Conservative	Grant Shearer	108	4.1	▼3.2
Green	David Lawson	64	2.5	▼0.6
Rejected ballots		7	0.3	
Majority		1,226	46.8	
Turnout		2,617	35.1	
Registered electors		7,530		
Liberal Democrats gain from Labour		Swing	▲46.3	

The Liberal Democrat candidate had won this seat in a by-election in February 2018 following the death of the incumbent Labour councillor. The 2019 result, whilst a hold for the Liberal Democrats, is technically a gain from Labour based on the last time the seat was contested at a local election in 2015.

=== Redhill Ward ===
Redhill Ward
Party	Candidate	Votes	%	±%
UKIP	Keith Jenkins	866	41.0	▲41.0 new
Labour	Iain Kay	795	37.6	▼22.5
Conservative	Michael Winter	299	14.1	▼3.5
Green	Rafal Marzec	154	7.3	▲2.9
Rejected ballots		8	0.4	
Majority		71	3.3	
Turnout		2,122	26.7	
Registered electors		7,961		
UKIP gain from Labour		Swing	▲21.8	

=== Ryhope Ward ===
Ryhope Ward
Party	Candidate	Votes	%	±%
UKIP	Steven Bewick	946	34.4	▲34.4 new
Labour	Ellen Ball*	927	33.7	▼17.0
Conservative	Andrei Lucaci	424	15.4	▼16.0
Green	Emma Robson	249	9.1	▼2.3
Liberal Democrats	Keith Townsend	188	6.8	▲0.9
Rejected ballots		17	0.6	
Majority		19	0.7	
Turnout		2,751	33.1	
Registered electors		8,328		
UKIP gain from Labour		Swing		

=== Sandhill Ward ===
Sandhill Ward
Party	Candidate	Votes	%	±%
Liberal Democrats	Stephen O'Brien*	1,050	40.1	▼5.0
Liberal Democrats	Margaret Crosby	824	31.5	▼13.6
UKIP	Hugh Clinton	735	28.1	▲28.1 new
Labour	Nathan Davison	635	24.3	▼11.7
Labour	Joanne Laverick	545	20.8	▼15.2
UKIP	William Cowe	480	18.3	▲18.3 new
Populist	Tony Morrow	245	9.4	▲9.4 new
Green	Alexandra Mills	149	5.7	▲0.9
Conservative	Christine Reed	144	5.5	▼8.4
Conservative	Thomas Such	79	3.0	▼10.9
Rejected ballots		7	0.5	
Majority		315	12	
Turnout		2,618	33.3	
Registered electors		7,863		
Liberal Democrats gain from Labour		Swing		
Liberal Democrats hold		Swing		

There was a double vacancy in Sandhill Ward at the 2019 elections. Stephen O'Brien had won the first seat in a by-election in January 2017. The 2019 result, whilst a hold for the Liberal Democrats, was technically a gain from Labour based on the last time the seat was contested at a local election in 2015. The second seat was up for election as the Liberal Democrat candidate who won in 2018 stood down ahead of the 2019 elections. Margaret Crosby defended the seat for the Liberal Democrats.

=== Shiney Row Ward ===
Shiney Row Ward
Party	Candidate	Votes	%	±%
Labour	Geoffrey Walker*	1,229	38.8	▼15.6
UKIP	Richard Elvin	819	25.9	▲25.9 new
Conservative	Clair Hall	482	15.2	▼8.5
Green	Katy Sawyer	229	7.2	▲2.5
Populist	Kevin Bunker	212	6.7	▼6.5
Liberal Democrats	Nana Boddy	180	5.7	▲1.6
Rejected ballots		13	0.4	
Majority		410	13	
Turnout		3,164	32.7	
Registered electors		9,666		
Labour hold		Swing		

=== Silksworth Ward ===
Silksworth Ward
Party	Candidate	Votes	%	±%
Labour	Peter Gibson*	1,090	37.5	
UKIP	Kay Rowham	818	28.1	
Conservative	Gwennyth Gibson	572	19.7	
Green	Neil Shaplin	279	9.6	
Populist	Brian Clare	136	4.7	
Rejected ballots		13	0.4	
Majority		272	9.4	
Turnout		2,908	36	
Registered electors		8,085		
Labour hold		Swing		

=== Southwick Ward ===
Southwick Ward
Party	Candidate	Votes	%	±%
Labour	Michael Butler	1,025	39.3	
UKIP	David White	575	22.1	
Independent	Christopher Marshall	362	13.9	
Conservative	Liam Ritchie	351	13.5	
Green	Anna Debska	148	5.7	
Liberal Democrats	Peter Walton	135	5.2	
Rejected ballots		9	0.3	
Majority		450	17.3	
Turnout		2,605	32.7	
Registered electors		7,957		
Labour hold		Swing		

=== St Anne's Ward ===
St Anne's Ward
Party	Candidate	Votes	%	±%
UKIP	Pam Mann	773	34.6	
Labour	Alison Smith	732	32.8	
Conservative	Gavin Wilson	374	16.7	
Liberal Democrats	Emma Neale	202	9	
Green	Billy Scott Howells	142	6.4	
Rejected ballots		11	0.5	
Majority		41	1.8	
Turnout		2,234	27.9	
Registered electors		7,995		
UKIP gain from Labour		Swing		

=== St Chad's Ward ===
St Chad's Ward
Party	Candidate	Votes	%	±%
Conservative	Dominic McDonough	1,200	39.7	
Labour	Gillian Galbraith*	844	27.9	
UKIP	Alan Davies	674	22.3	
Green	Scott Burrows	176	5.8	
Liberal Democrats	Colin Nicholson	122	4.0	
Rejected ballots		5	0.2	
Majority		356	11.8	
Turnout		3,021	40.3	
Registered electors		7,500		
Conservative gain from Labour		Swing		

=== St Michael's Ward ===
St Michael's Ward
Party	Candidate	Votes	%	±%
Conservative	Peter Wood*	1,721	50.7	
Labour	Stewart Ingram	716	21.1	
UKIP	Ian Walton	413	12.2	
Green	John Appleton	349	10.3	
Liberal Democrats	Diana Talbott Matthew	186	5.5	
Rejected ballots		9	0.3	
Majority		1,005	29.6	
Turnout		3,394	41	
Registered electors		8,279		
Conservative hold		Swing		

=== St Peter's Ward ===
St Peter's Ward
Party	Candidate	Votes	%	±%
Conservative	Joshua McKeith	1,154	34.9	
Labour	Barry Curran*	866	26.2	
UKIP	Ian Lines	602	18.2	
Liberal Democrats	John Lennox	348	10.5	
Green	Rachel Featherstone	329	9.9	
Rejected ballots		10	0.3	
Majority		288	8.7	
Turnout		3,309	41	
Registered electors		8,070		
Conservative gain from Labour		Swing		

=== Washington Central Ward ===
Washington Central Ward
Party	Candidate	Votes	%	±%
Labour	Len Lauchlan*	1,156	41.3	▼19.3
UKIP	Erland Polden	711	25.4	▲25.4 new
Conservative	Anna Snell	509	18.2	▼12.3
Green	Michal Chantkowski	259	9.3	▲0.8
Liberal Democrats	Maciej Zagdan	164	5.9	▲5.9 new
Rejected ballots		19		
Majority		445		
Turnout		2,818	33	
Registered electors		8,534		
Labour hold		Swing		

=== Washington East Ward ===
Washington East Ward
Party	Candidate	Votes	%	±%
Labour	Fiona Miller*	1,142	37.6	▼12.5
Conservative	Hilary Johnson	731	24.0	▼12
UKIP	Hazel Whitfield	589	19.4	▲19.4 new
Green	Michael Ellis	366	12.0	▲6
Liberal Democrats	Sean Terry	213	7.0	▼0.5
Rejected ballots		17		
Majority		411		
Turnout		3,058	33.9	
Registered electors		9,015		
Labour hold		Swing		

=== Washington North Ward ===
Washington North Ward
Party	Candidate	Votes	%	±%
Labour	Peter Walker*	1,007	42.7	▼20.2
UKIP	Tony Ormond	702	29.8	▲29.8 new
Conservative	Carol Groombridge	287	12.2	▼6.2
Green	June Bradley	275	11.7	▲4.6
Liberal Democrats	Kevin Morris	85	3.6	▼1.4
Rejected ballots		12		
Majority		305		
Turnout		2,368	29.4	
Registered electors		8,056		
Labour hold		Swing		

=== Washington South Ward ===
Washington South Ward
Party	Candidate	Votes	%	±%
Green	Dom Armstrong	711	24.8	▲15.5
Labour	Sean Laws	708	24.7	▼22.5
Conservative	Martin Talbot	553	19.3	▼16.4
UKIP	Luke Bond	535	18.7	▲18.7 new
Liberal Democrats	Carlton West	347	12.1	▲4.6
Rejected ballots		11	0.4	▲4.6
Majority		3	0.1	
Turnout		2,865	36.8	
Registered electors		7,787		
Green gain from Labour		Swing		

=== Washington West Ward ===
Washington West Ward
Party	Candidate	Votes	%	±%
Labour	Harry Trueman*	1,235	42.6	▼16.6
UKIP	Kevin Sheppard	674	23.3	▲23.3 new
Conservative	Olwyn Bird	440	15.2	▼10
Green	Paul Leonard	405	14.0	▲4.5
Liberal Democrats	Odet Aszkenasy	144	5.0	▼0.8
Rejected ballots		13		
Majority		561		
Turnout		2,911	32.8	
Registered electors		8,878		
Labour hold		Swing		
