= Millfield, Tyne and Wear =

Area of Sunderland, England

Coordinates: 54.906475°N 1.400882°W

Millfield
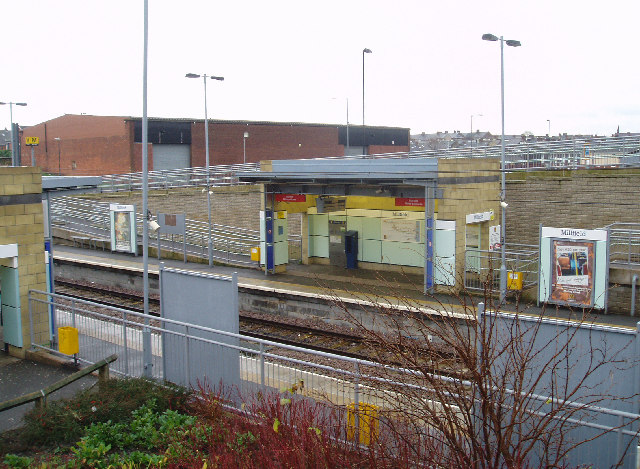
- Millfield Metro Station, Sunderland.

- Location within Tyne and Wear
- Population: 10,575 (2021)
- OS grid reference: NZ385570
- Metropolitan borough: City of Sunderland
- Metropolitan county: Tyne and Wear
- Region: North East
- Country: England
- Sovereign state: United Kingdom
- Post town: SUNDERLAND
- Postcode district: SR4
- Dialling code: 0191
- Police: Northumbria
- Fire: Tyne and Wear
- Ambulance: North East
- UK Parliament: Sunderland Central

Millfield is a suburb and electoral ward of the City of Sunderland, in Tyne and Wear, England. Millfield was part of the Sunderland North parliamentary constituency for elections to the House of Commons of the United Kingdom, but in 2010 was made a ward of the new Sunderland Central parliamentary constituency.

Primarily consisting of low-rise suburban households, it is flanked on its east side by the A1231 road, and on its west side by Sunderland Royal Hospital. The Millfield metro station is centrally located within Mllfield, besides an Aldi store on St. Marks Road, and Masjid e Anwaar e Madinah, the largest mosque in Sunderland. It connects Millfield to the Tyne and Wear Metro

== History ==
An early Testament to Millfield can be found in the Imperial Gazetteer of England and Wales, where it is described as "a railway station in Durham; on the Sunderland, Leamside, and Bishop-Auckland railway, 1 mile West of Sunderland". Prior to the 20th Century, much of Millfield was undeveloped, being primarily constituted of farmland and scattered houses. A Brickfield was present adjacent to the old train station, where bricks were produced using clay sourced on the same site. An Engine Works and a quarry were also present near the station.

Beginning in 1890, terraced houses began to be constructed where the former train station and brickfields were in order to house Sunderland's growing population. By the mid-1910s, all of Millfield had been turned into suburbs.

== Demography ==
In the 2021 Census, Millfield ward counted 10,616 residents^{[a]}, down 11.9% from the 2011 census. Of these, 56% of residents reported they lived with their family, 36.3% reported they lived alone, 3.2% lived alone with dependent children, and 4.5% had "other" accommodation.

The ethnic identity of Millfield's residents as listed in the 2011 and 2021 census is as follows:

| Ethnic Identity | 2011 United Kingdom census | 2021 United Kingdom census |
|---|---|---|
| White | 77% | 64.5% |
| Asian | 18.4% | 23.1% |
| Black | 2.2% | 07.5% |
| Mixed | 1.2% | 1.5% |
| Other | 1.2% | 3.4% |

At 28%, Millfield has the highest Foreign born population among its residents of any ward in Sunderland.

== Notes ==
1.^a Population data for Millfield collected by the ONS does not include the entire area of The Metropolitan District Ward of Millfield.
