= Sunderland =

City in Tyne and Wear, England

- City
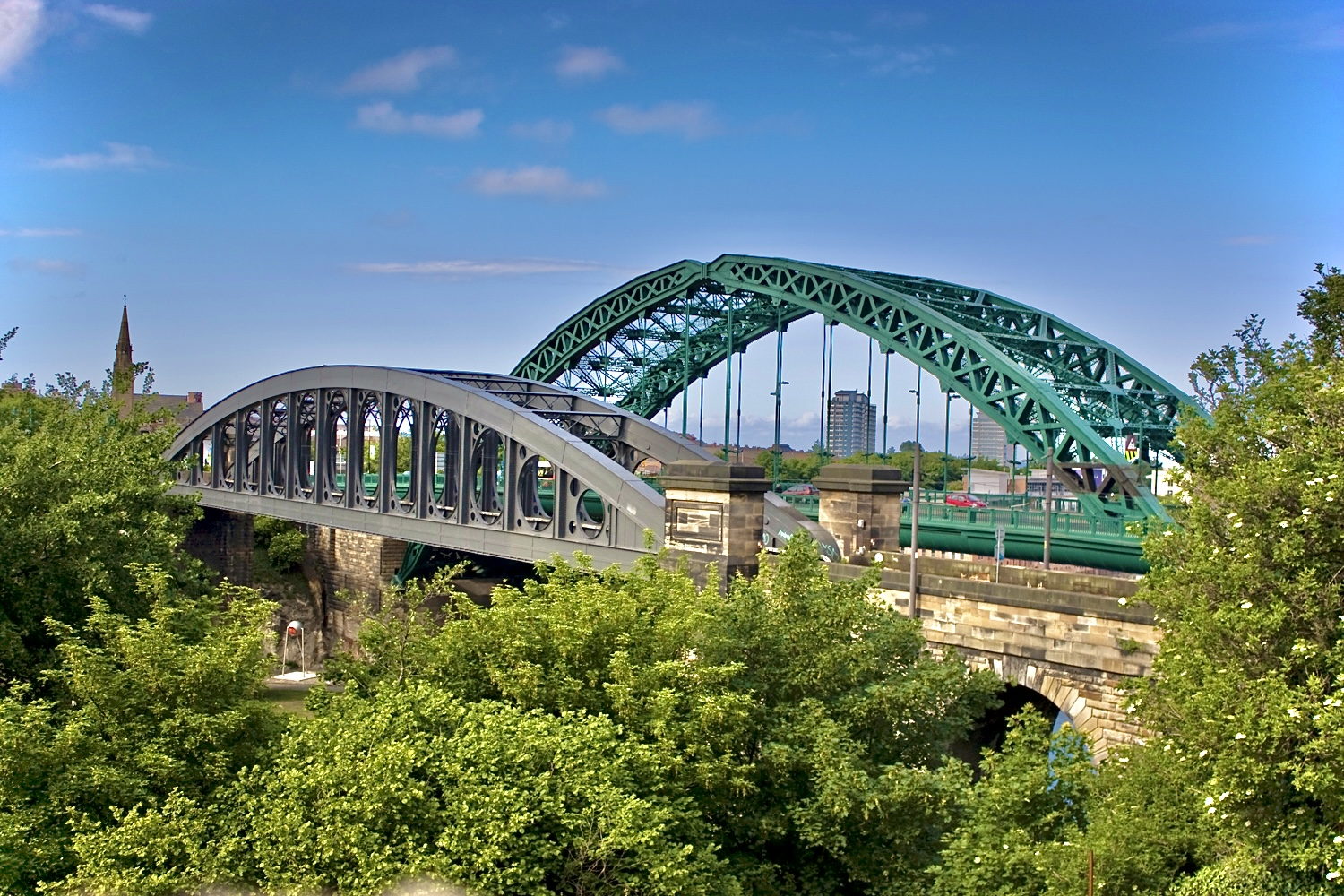
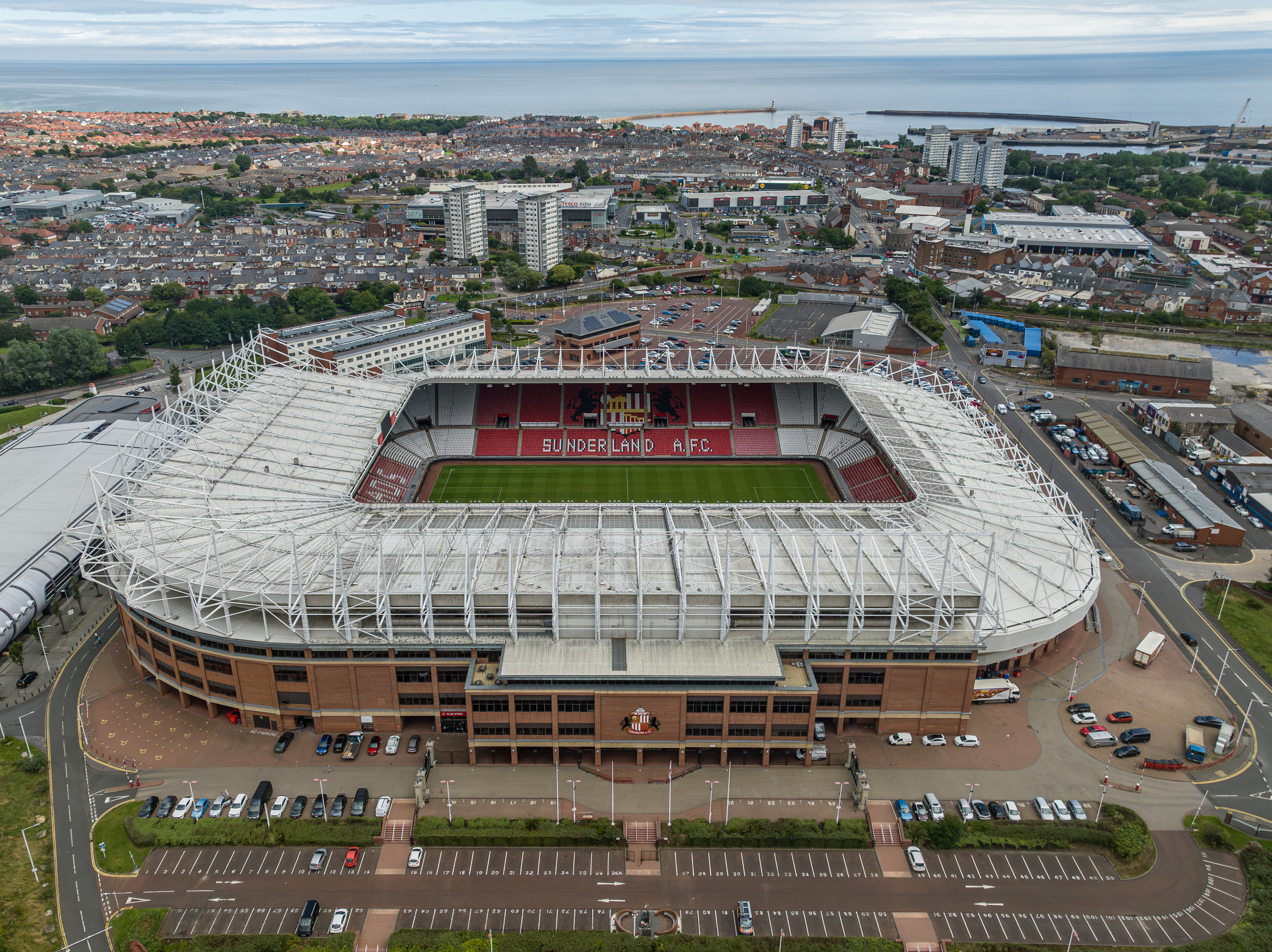
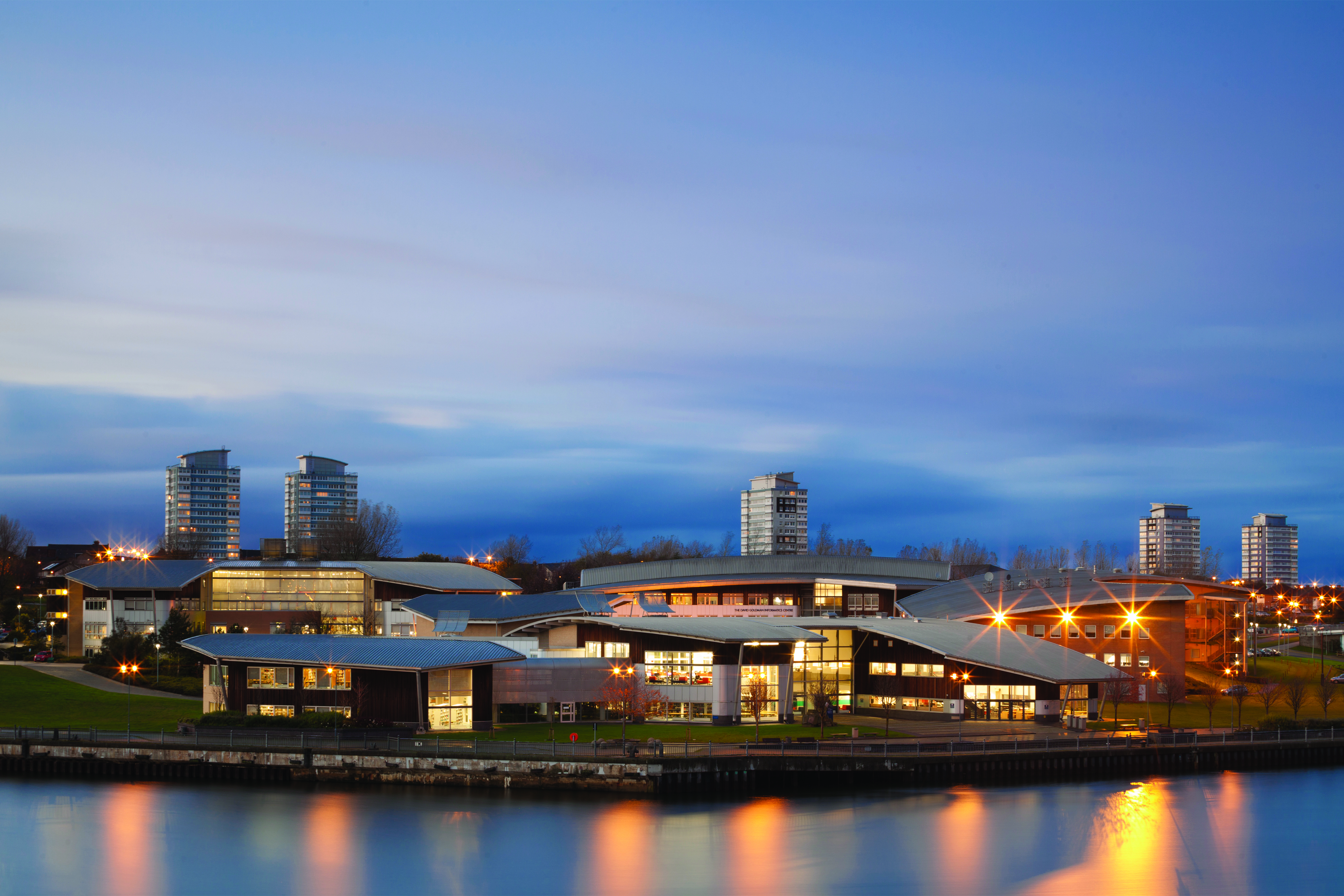
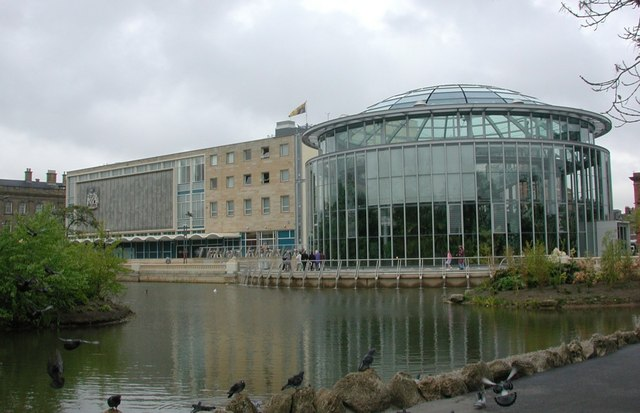
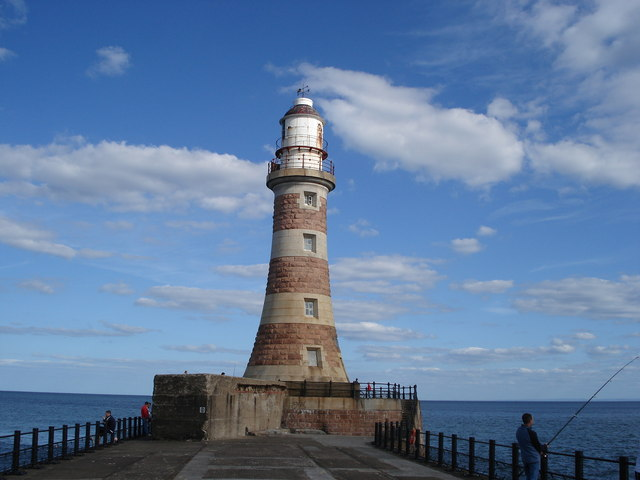
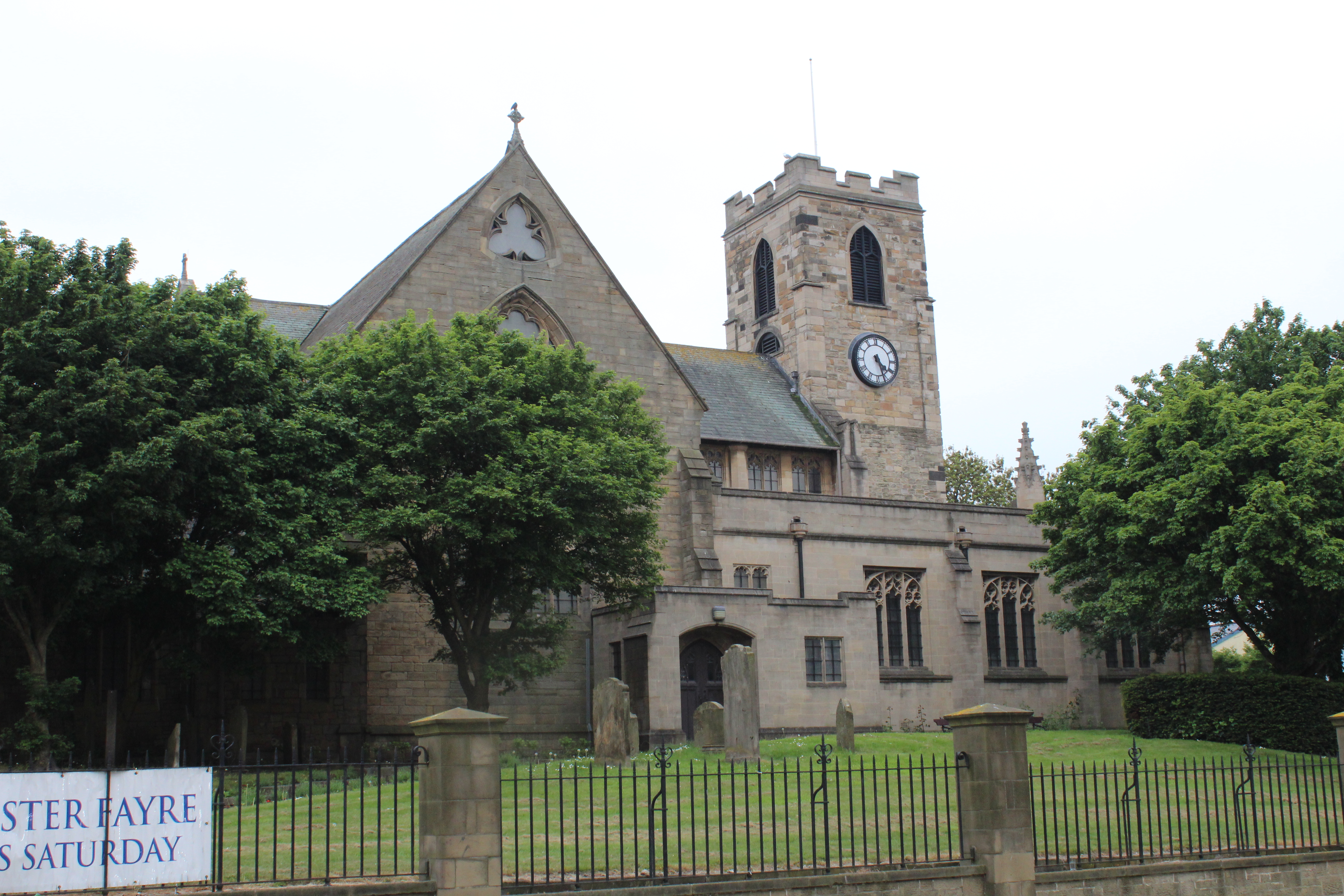
- Monkwearmouth Railway Bridge (left) and Wearmouth Bridge (right) Stadium of Light University of Sunderland Sunderland Museum and Winter Gardens Roker Pier Lighthouse Sunderland Minster

- Coat of arms
- Motto: Latin: Nil Desperandum Auspice Deo, lit. 'do not despair, have faith in God'
- Sunderland shown within Tyne and Wear
- Coordinates: 54°54′16″N 1°22′52″W
- Sovereign state: United Kingdom
- Country: England
- Region: North East
- Ceremonial county: Tyne and Wear
- Historic County: County Durham
- City region: North East
- Founded: 674 AD
- City status: 1992
- City of Sunderland: 1 April 1974
- Administrative HQ: City Hall, Sunderland

Government
  - Type: Metropolitan borough
  - Body: Sunderland City Council
  - Executive: Leader and cabinet
  - Control: Reform UK
  - Leader: Chris Eynon (R)
  - Mayor: Robert Hutchinson
  - MPs: 3 MPs: Lewis Atkinson (L); Sharon Hodgson (L); Bridget Phillipson (L)

Area
  - Total: 137 km^{2} (53 sq mi)
  - Rank: 172nd

Population (2025)
  - Total: 287,070
  - Rank: 59th
  - Density: 2,089/km^{2} (5,410/sq mi)
- Demonym: Mackem (colloq.)

Ethnicity (2021)
  - Ethnic groups: List: 94.6% White; 3.0% Asian; 1.0% Black; 0.9% Mixed; 0.5% other

Religion (2021)
  - Religion: List: 53.2% Christianity; 39.5% no religion; 1.8% Islam; 0.3% Sikhism; 0.2% Hinduism; 0.2% Buddhism; 0.0% Judaism; 0.3% other; 4.5% not stated
- Time zone: UTC+0 (GMT)
  - Summer (DST): UTC+1 (BST)
- Postcode area: SR1-6; SR9; SR43; NE37-38; DH4-5
- Dialling code: 0191
- ISO 3166 code: GB-SND
- GSS code: E08000024
- Website: sunderland.gov.uk

Sunderland (/ˈsʌndərlənd/) is a port city in the county of Tyne and Wear in North East England. It is a port at the mouth of the River Wear on the North Sea, approximately 10 miles (16 km) south-east of Newcastle upon Tyne. It is the most populous settlement in the Wearside conurbation and the second-most populous settlement, after Newcastle. It is the administrative centre of the wider Metropolitan Borough of Sunderland.

The centre of the modern city is an amalgamation of three settlements founded in the Anglo-Saxon era: Monkwearmouth, on the north bank of the Wear, and Sunderland and Bishopwearmouth on the south bank. Monkwearmouth contains St Peter's Church, which was founded in 674 and formed part of Monkwearmouth–Jarrow Abbey, a significant centre of learning in the seventh and eighth centuries. Sunderland was a fishing settlement and later a port, being granted a town charter in 1179. The city traded in coal and salt, also developing a shipbuilding industry in the fourteenth century and a glassmaking industry in the seventeenth century.

Sunderland was once known as 'the largest shipbuilding town in the world' and made a quarter of all of the world's ships in its yards. Following the decline of its traditional industries in the late 20th century, the area became an automotive building centre. In 1992, the borough of Sunderland was granted city status. Sunderland was historically a part of County Durham, it was incorporated into the ceremonial county of Tyne and Wear in 1974.

Locals are sometimes known as Mackems, a term which came into common use in the 1970s. Its use and acceptance by residents, particularly among the older generations, is not universal. The term is also applied to the Sunderland dialect, which shares similarities with the other North-East England dialects.

== Toponymy ==
In c. 674, King Ecgfrith granted Benedict Biscop a "sunder-land". In 685 The Venerable Bede moved to the newly founded Jarrow monastery. He had started his monastic career at Monkwearmouth monastery and later wrote that he was "ácenned on sundorlande þæs ylcan mynstres" (born in a separate land of this same monastery). This can be taken as "sundorlande" (being Old English for "separate land") or the settlement of Sunderland. The name may also be descriptive of the original settlement's location, being almost cut off (sundered) from the rest of the mainland by creeks and gullies from both the sea and the River Wear.

== History ==
=== Early, ancient and Medieval ===
The earliest inhabitants of the Sunderland area were Stone Age hunter-gatherers. Artefacts from this era have been discovered, including microliths found during excavations at St Peter's Church, Monkwearmouth. During the final phase of the Stone Age, the Neolithic period (c. 4000 – c. 2000 BC), Hastings Hill, on the western outskirts of Sunderland, was a focal point of activity and a place of burial and ritual significance. Evidence includes the former presence of a cursus monument.

It is believed the Brythonic-speaking Brigantes inhabited the area around the River Wear in pre-Roman Britain. There is a long-standing local legend that there was a Roman settlement on the south bank of the River Wear on what is the site of the former Vaux Brewery, although no archaeological investigation has taken place.

Roman artefacts have been recovered in the River Wear at North Hylton, including four stone anchors, which may support the theory there was a Roman dam or port on the River Wear.

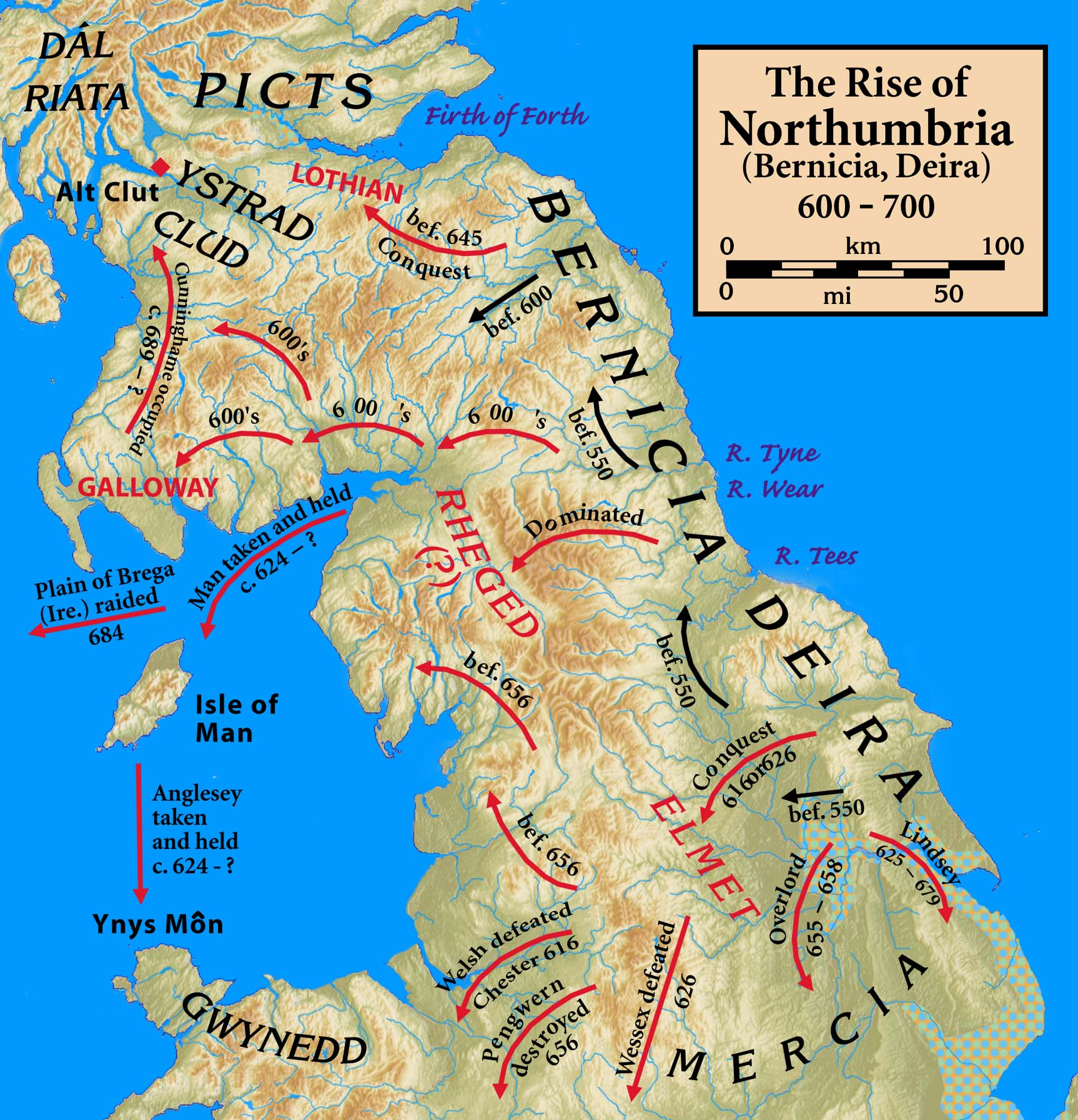
The areas that are now Sunderland were once part of the Brythonic Hen Ogledd lands in the Dark Ages; the land was Anglicised over time and merged into Northumbria.

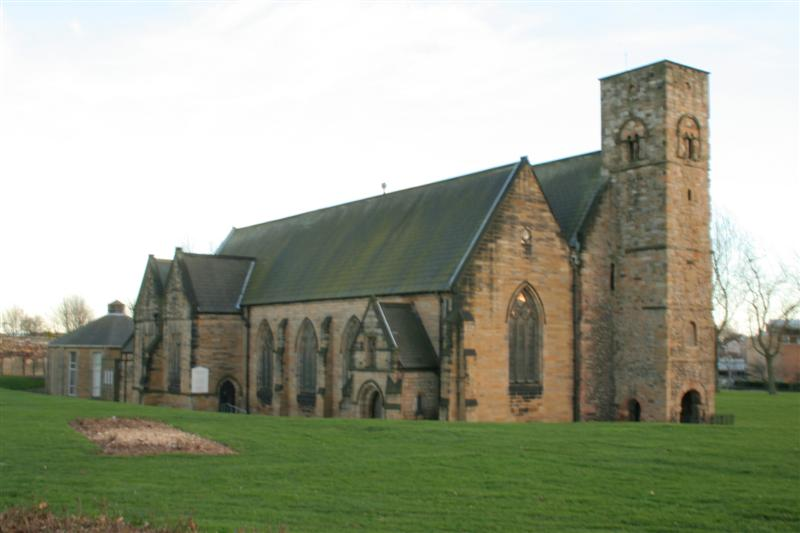
St Peter's Church in Monkwearmouth. Only the porch and part of the west wall remain from the original monastery built in 674.

Recorded settlements at the mouth of the Wear date to c. 674, when an Anglo-Saxon nobleman, Benedict Biscop, was granted land by King Ecgfrith and founded the Wearmouth–Jarrow (St Peter's) monastery on the north bank of the river—an area that became known as Monkwearmouth. Biscop's monastery was the first built of stone in Northumbria. He employed glaziers from France and in doing so he re-established glass making in Britain. In 686, the community was taken over by Ceolfrid, and Wearmouth–Jarrow became a major centre of learning and knowledge in Anglo-Saxon England with a library of around 300 volumes.

The Codex Amiatinus, described by biblical scholar Henry Julian White (1859–1934) as the 'finest book in the world', was created at the monastery and was likely worked on by Bede, who was born at Wearmouth in 673. This is one of the oldest monasteries still standing in England. While at the monastery, Bede completed the Historia ecclesiastica gentis Anglorum (The Ecclesiastical History of the English People) in 731, a feat which earned him the title The father of English history.

In the late 8th century the Vikings raided the coast, and by the middle of the 9th century the monastery had been abandoned. Lands on the south side of the river were granted to the Bishop of Durham by Athelstan of England in 930; these became known as Bishopwearmouth and included settlements such as Ryhope which fall within the modern boundary of Sunderland.

In 1100, Bishopwearmouth parish included a fishing village at the southern mouth of the river (now the East End) known as 'Soender-land' (which evolved into 'Sunderland'). This settlement was granted a charter in 1179 under the name of the borough of Wearmouth by Hugh Pudsey, then the Bishop of Durham (who had quasi-monarchical power within the County Palatine of Durham). The charter gave its merchants the same rights as those of Newcastle upon Tyne, but it nevertheless took time for Sunderland to develop as a port. Fishing was the main commercial activity at the time: mainly herring in the 13th century, then salmon in the 14th and 15th centuries. From 1346 ships were built at Wearmouth, by a merchant named Thomas Menville, and by 1396 a small amount of coal was being exported.

=== 1600s and 1700s ===
Rapid growth of the port was prompted by the salt trade. Salt exports from Sunderland are recorded from as early as the 13th century. By 1589 salt pans were laid at Bishopwearmouth Panns (the modern-day name of the area the pans occupied is Pann's Bank, on the river bank between the city centre and the East End). Large vats of seawater were heated using coal; as the water evaporated, the salt remained. As coal was required to heat the salt pans, a coal mining community began to emerge. Only poor-quality coal was used in salt panning; better-quality coal was traded via the port, which subsequently began to grow.

Both salt and coal continued to be exported through the 17th century, with the coal trade growing significantly (2–3,000 tons of coal were exported from Sunderland in the year 1600; by 1680 this had increased to 180,000 tons). Difficulty for colliers trying to navigate the Wear's shallow waters meant coal mined further inland was loaded onto keels (large, flat-bottomed boats) and taken downriver to the waiting colliers. A close-knit group of workers manned the Keels as 'keelmen'. In 1634 a market and yearly fair charter was granted by Bishop Thomas Morton. Morton's charter acknowledged that the borough had been called Wearmouth until then, but it incorporated the place under the name of Sunderland, by which it had become more generally known.

Before the outbreak of the English civil war, the North, with the exception of Kingston upon Hull, declared for the King. In 1644 the North was captured by the Roundheads (Parliamentarians), the area around Sunderland itself being taken in March of that year. One artefact of the civil war in the area was the long trench; a tactic of later warfare. In the village of Offerton roughly three miles inland from the present city centre, skirmishes occurred. The Roundheads blockaded the River Tyne, crippling the Newcastle coal trade, which allowed a short period of flourishing coal trade on the Wear.

In 1669, after the Restoration, King Charles II granted letters patent to one Edward Andrew, Esq. to 'build a pier and erect a lighthouse or lighthouses and cleanse the harbour of Sunderland'. A tonnage duty was levied on shipping in order to raise the necessary funds. There were a growing number of shipbuilders or boatbuilders active on the River Wear in the late 17th century.

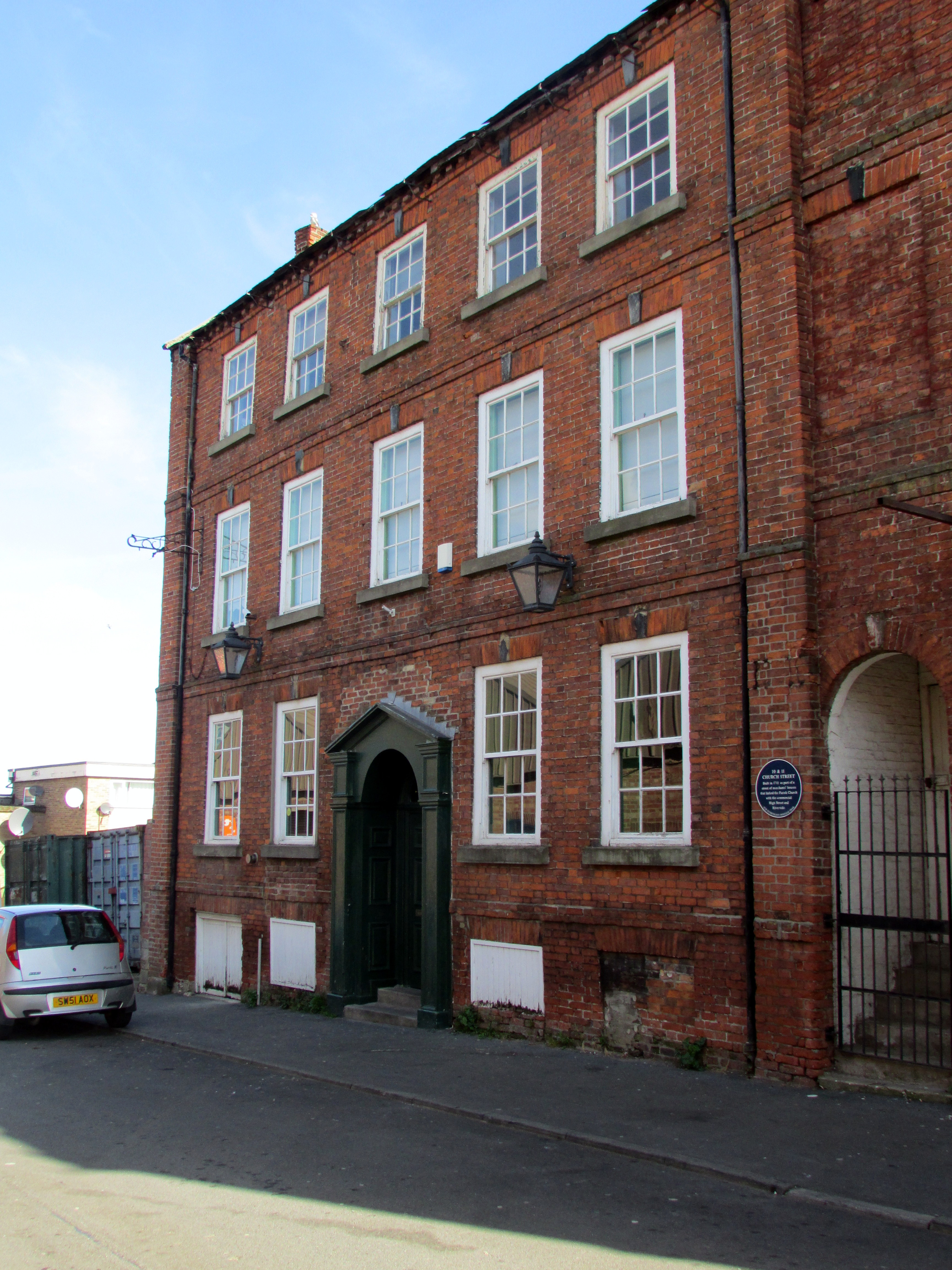
Rare surviving early 18th-century merchant's house (later used as a warehouse) in Church Street, Sunderland

By the start of the 18th century the banks of the Wear were described as being studded with small shipyards, as far as the tide flowed. After measures were taken in 1717 to increase the depth of the river, Sunderland's shipbuilding trade grew substantially, in parallel with its coal exports. A number of warships were built, along with many commercial sailing ships. By the middle of the century the town was probably the premier shipbuilding centre in Britain. Ships built in Sunderland were known as 'Jamies'. By 1788 Sunderland was Britain's fourth largest port by measure of tonnage, after London, Newcastle and Liverpool; among these it was the leading coal exporter (though it did not rival Newcastle in terms of home coal trade). Still further growth was driven across the region, towards the end of the century, by London's insatiable demand for coal during the French Revolutionary Wars.

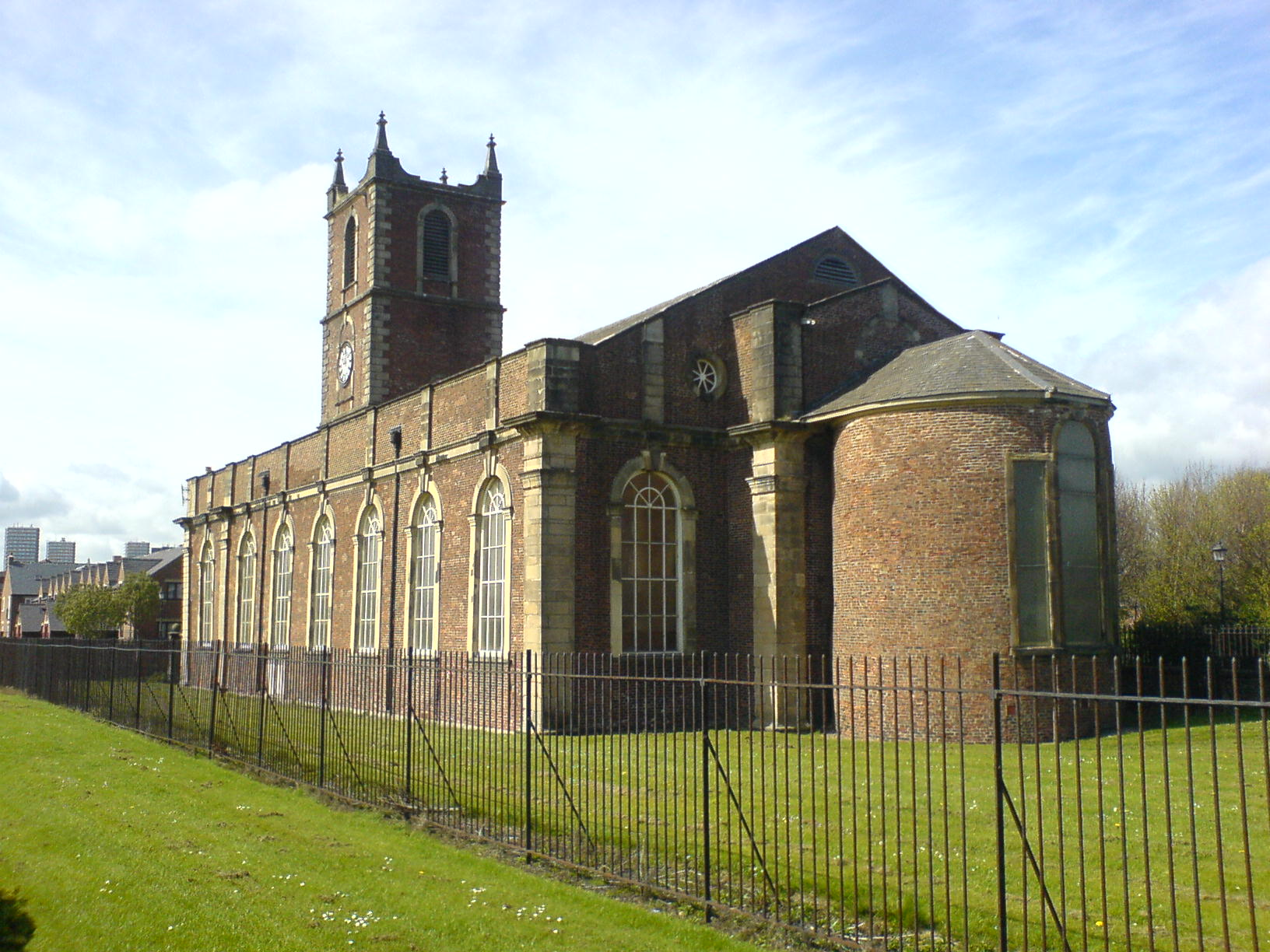
Holy Trinity Church, Sunderland, completed in 1719

Until 1719 the borough of Sunderland formed part of the wider parish of Bishopwearmouth. Following the completion of Holy Trinity Church, Sunderland (today also known as Sunderland Old Parish Church) in 1719, the borough was made a separate parish called Sunderland. Later, in 1769, St John's Church was built as a chapel of ease within Holy Trinity parish; built by a local coal fitter, John Thornhill, it stood in Prospect Row to the north-east of the parish church. St John's was demolished in 1972. By 1720 the port area was completely built up, with large houses and gardens facing the Town Moor and the sea, and labourers' dwellings vying with manufactories alongside the river. The three original settlements - Bishopwearmouth, Monkwearmouth and Sunderland - had started to combine, driven by the success of the port of Sunderland, salt panning and shipbuilding along the banks of the river. Around this time, Sunderland was known as 'Sunderland-near-the-Sea'.

Sunderland's third-biggest export, after coal and salt, was glass. The town's first modern glassworks were established in the 1690s and the industry grew through the 17th century. Its flourishing was aided by trading ships bringing good-quality sand (as ballast) from the Baltic and elsewhere which, together with locally available limestone (and coal to fire the furnaces) was a key ingredient in the glassmaking process. Other industries that developed alongside the river included lime burning and pottery making (the town's first commercial pottery manufactory, the Garrison Pottery, had opened in old Sunderland in 1750).

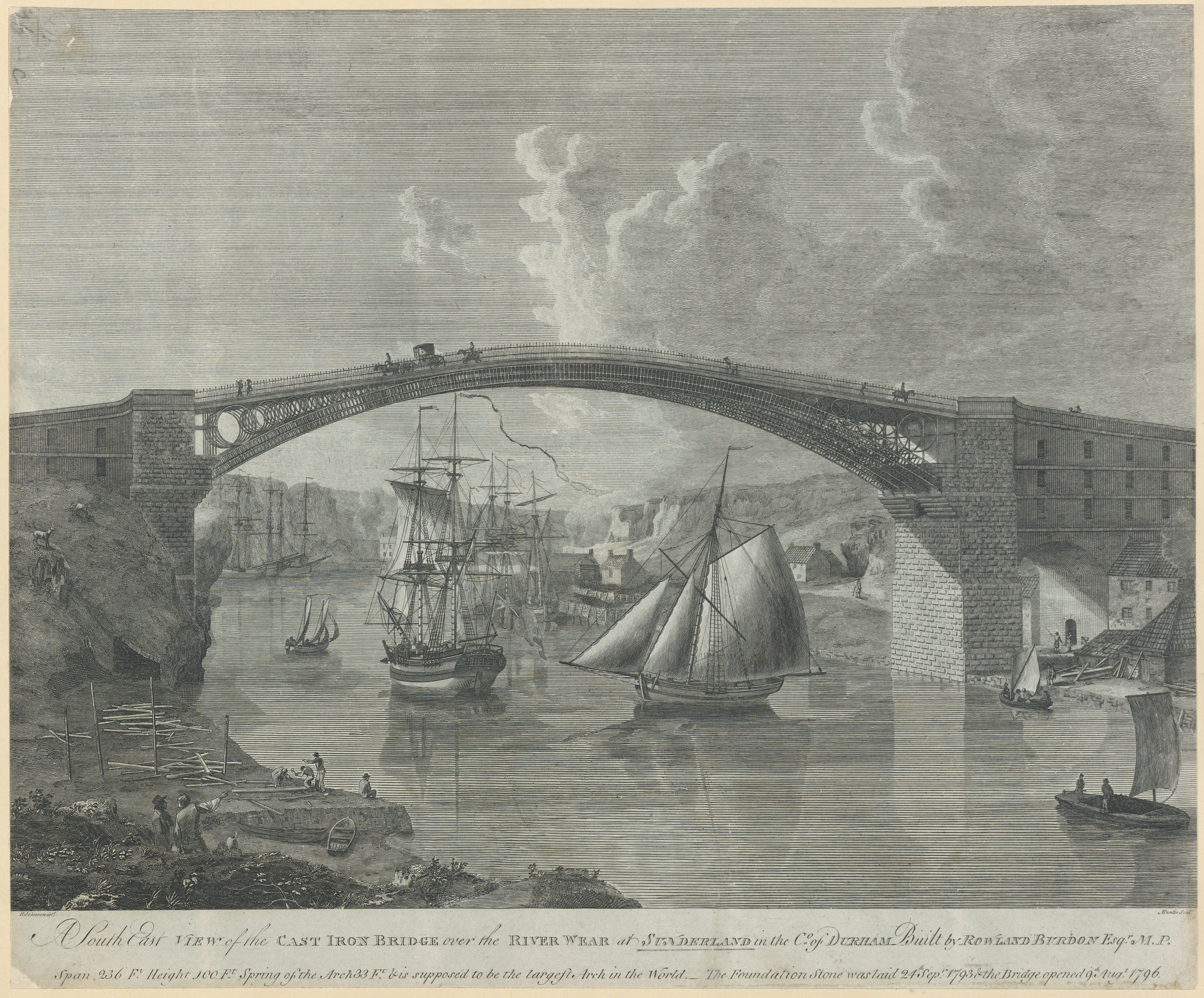
A south east view of Wearmouth Bridge (c. 1796)

By 1770 Sunderland had spread westwards along its High Street to join up with Bishopwearmouth. In 1796 Bishopwearmouth in turn gained a physical link with Monkwearmouth following the construction of a bridge, the Wearmouth Bridge, which was the world's second iron bridge (after the famous span at Ironbridge). It was built at the instigation of Rowland Burdon, the Member of Parliament (MP) for County Durham, and described by Nikolaus Pevsner as being 'a triumph of the new metallurgy and engineering ingenuity [...] of superb elegance'. Spanning the river in a single sweep of 236 feet (72 m), it was over twice the length of the earlier bridge at Ironbridge but only three-quarters the weight. At the time of building, it was the biggest single-span bridge in the world; and because Sunderland had developed on a plateau above the river, it never suffered from the problem of interrupting the passage of high-masted vessels.

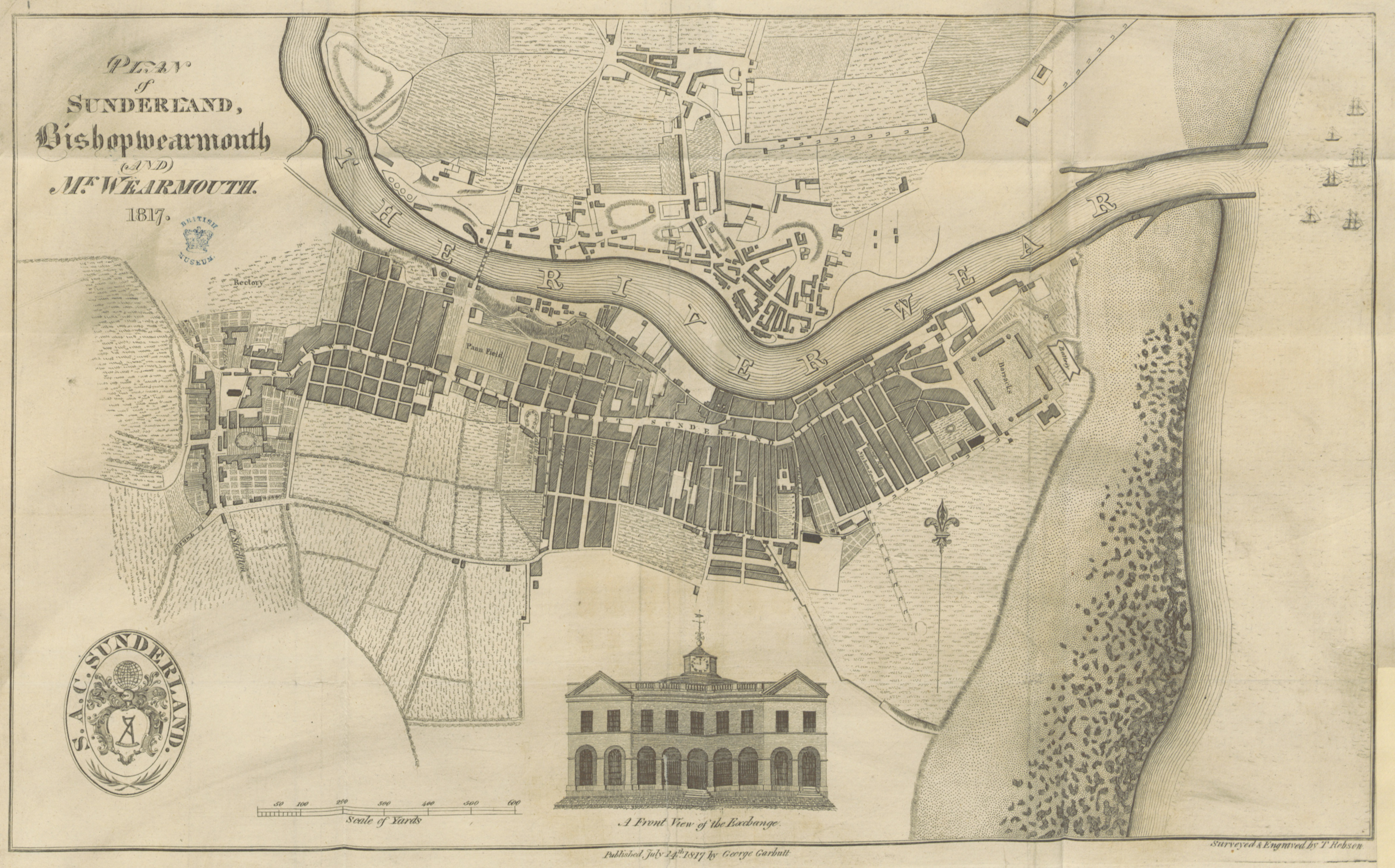
Early 19th century map showing the 18th-century barracks, battery and piers to the east, with the bridge and nearby 'Pann Field' to the west

During the War of Jenkins' Ear a pair of gun batteries were built (in 1742 and 1745) on the shoreline to the south of the South Pier, to defend the river from attack (a further battery was built on the cliff top in Roker, ten years later). One of the pair was washed away by the sea in 1780, but the other was expanded during the French Revolutionary Wars and became known as the Black Cat Battery. In 1794 Sunderland Barracks were built, behind the battery, close to what was then the tip of the headland.

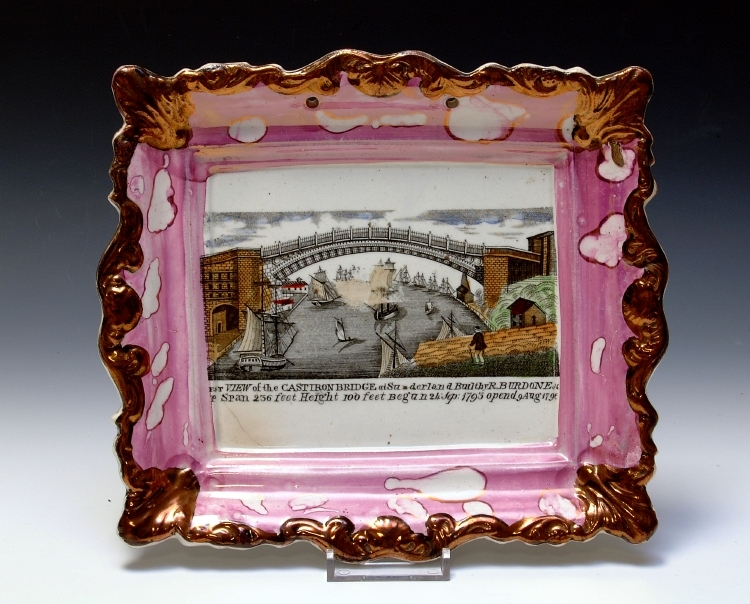
Commemorative plate, with pink 'splash lustre', depicting Wearmouth Bridge of 1796

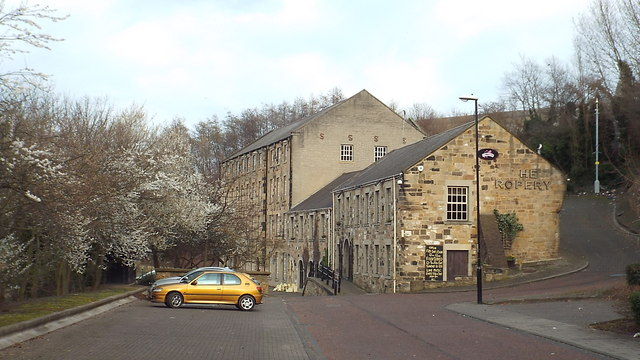
Grimshaw and Webster's Patent Ropery of 1797: the world's oldest factory for machine-made rope

The world's first steam dredger was built in Sunderland in 1796-7 and put to work on the river the following year. Designed by Stout's successor as Engineer, Jonathan Pickernell jr (in post from 1795 to 1804), it consisted of a set of 'bag and spoon' dredgers driven by a tailor-made 4-horsepower Boulton & Watt beam engine. It was designed to dredge to a maximum depth of 10 ft (3.0 m) below the waterline and remained in operation until 1804, when its constituent parts were sold as separate lots. Onshore, numerous small industries supported the business of the burgeoning port. In 1797 the world's first patent ropery (producing machine-made rope, rather than using a ropewalk) was built in Sunderland, using a steam-powered hemp-spinning machine which had been devised by a local schoolmaster, Richard Fothergill, in 1793; the ropery building still stands, in the Deptford area of the city.

=== "The greatest shipbuilding port in the world" ===
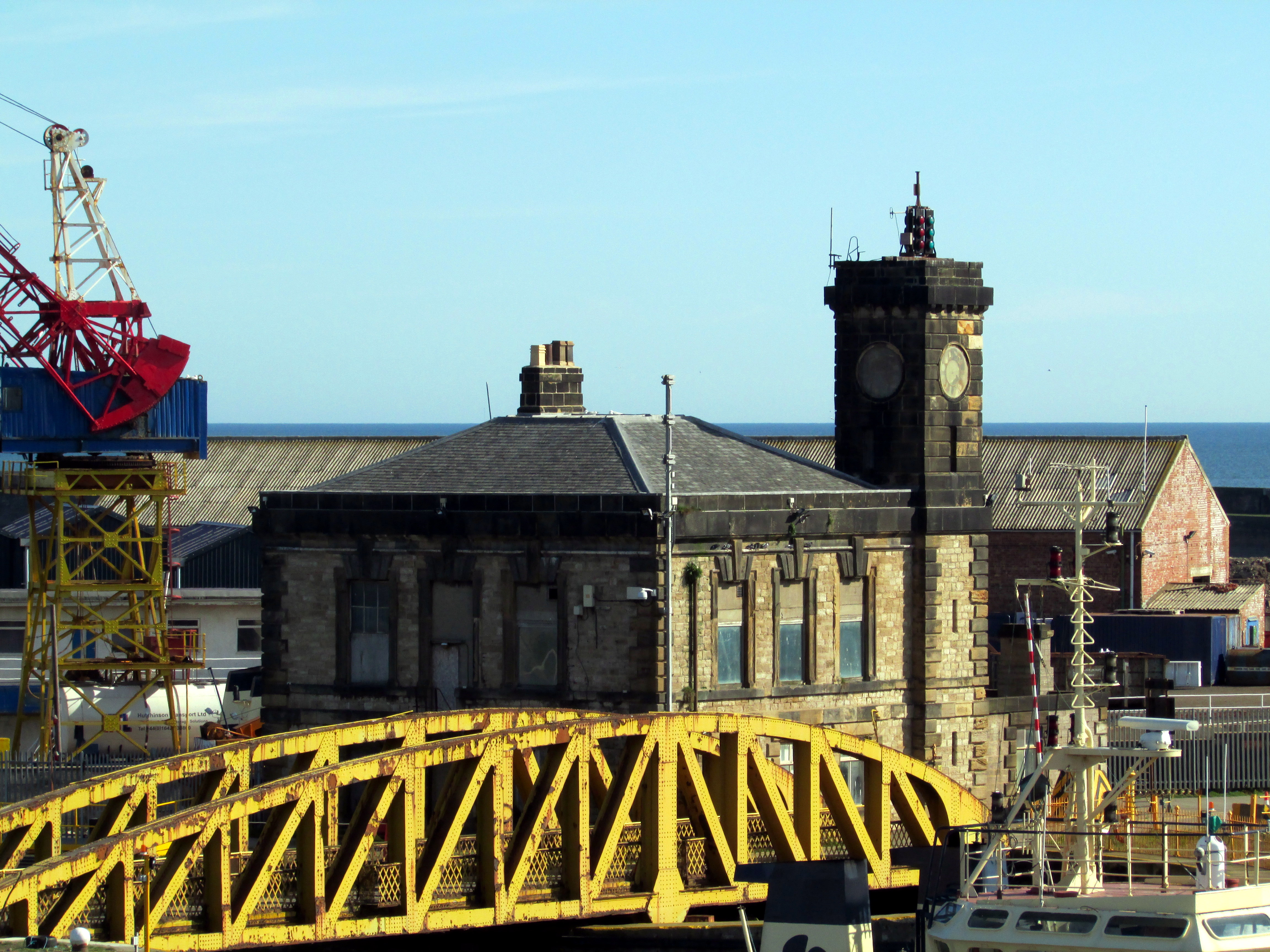
Sunderland Dock Company offices (1850, by John Murray) and the Gladstone Swing Bridge of 1874

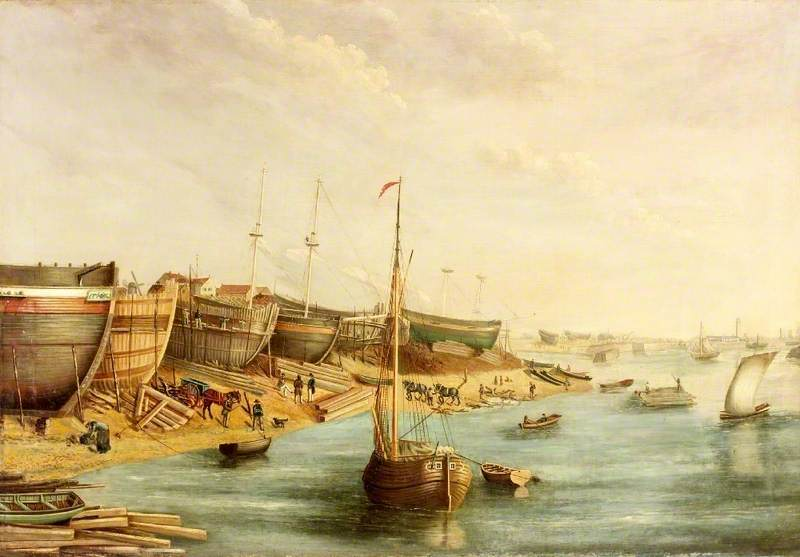
William Pile's Shipyard at North Sands, c. 1830; described as the greatest ship designer of his age, he built more than 100 ships in wood and almost as many in iron.

Sunderland's shipbuilding industry continued to grow through most of the 19th century, becoming the town's dominant industry and a defining part of its identity. By 1815 it was 'the leading shipbuilding port for wooden trading vessels' with 600 ships constructed that year across 31 different yards. By 1840 the town had 76 shipyards and between 1820 and 1850 the number of ships being built on the Wear increased fivefold. From 1846 to 1854 almost a third of the UK's ships were built in Sunderland, and in 1850 the Sunderland Herald proclaimed the town to be the greatest shipbuilding port in the world.

The Durham and Sunderland Railway Company built a railway line across the Town Moor and established a passenger terminus there in 1836. In 1847 the line was bought by George Hudson's York and Newcastle Railway. Hudson, nicknamed 'The Railway King', was Member of Parliament for Sunderland and was already involved in a scheme to build a dock in the area. In 1846 he had formed the Sunderland Dock Company, which received parliamentary approval for the construction of a dock between the South Pier and Hendon Bay.

Increasing industrialisation had prompted residential expansion away from the old port area in the suburban terraces of the Fawcett Estate and Mowbray Park. The area around Fawcett Street itself increasingly functioned as the civic and commercial town centre.

Marine engineering works were established from the 1820s onwards, initially providing engines for paddle steamers; in 1845 a ship named Experiment was the first of many to be converted to steam screw propulsion. Demand for steam-powered vessels increased during the Crimean War; nonetheless, sailing ships continued to be built, including fast fully-rigged composite-built clippers, including the City of Adelaide in 1864 and Torrens (the last such vessel ever built), in 1875.

By the middle of the century glassmaking was at its height on Wearside. James Hartley & Co., established in Sunderland in 1836, grew to be the largest glassworks in the country and (having patented an innovative production technique for rolled plate glass) produced much of the glass used in the construction of the Crystal Palace in 1851. A third of all UK-manufactured plate glass was produced at Hartley's by this time. Other manufacturers included the Cornhill Flint Glassworks (established at Southwick in 1865), which went on to specialise in pressed glass, as did the Wear Flint Glassworks (which had originally been established in 1697). In addition to the plate glass and pressed glass manufacturers there were 16 bottle works on the Wear in the 1850s, with the capacity to produce between 60 and 70,000 bottles a day.

In 1848 George Hudson's York, Newcastle and Berwick Railway built a passenger terminus, Monkwearmouth Station, just north of Wearmouth Bridge; and south of the river another passenger terminus, in Fawcett Street, in 1853. Later, Thomas Elliot Harrison (chief engineer to the North Eastern Railway) made plans to carry the railway across the river; the Wearmouth Railway Bridge (reputedly 'the largest Hog-Back iron girder bridge in the world') opened in 1879.

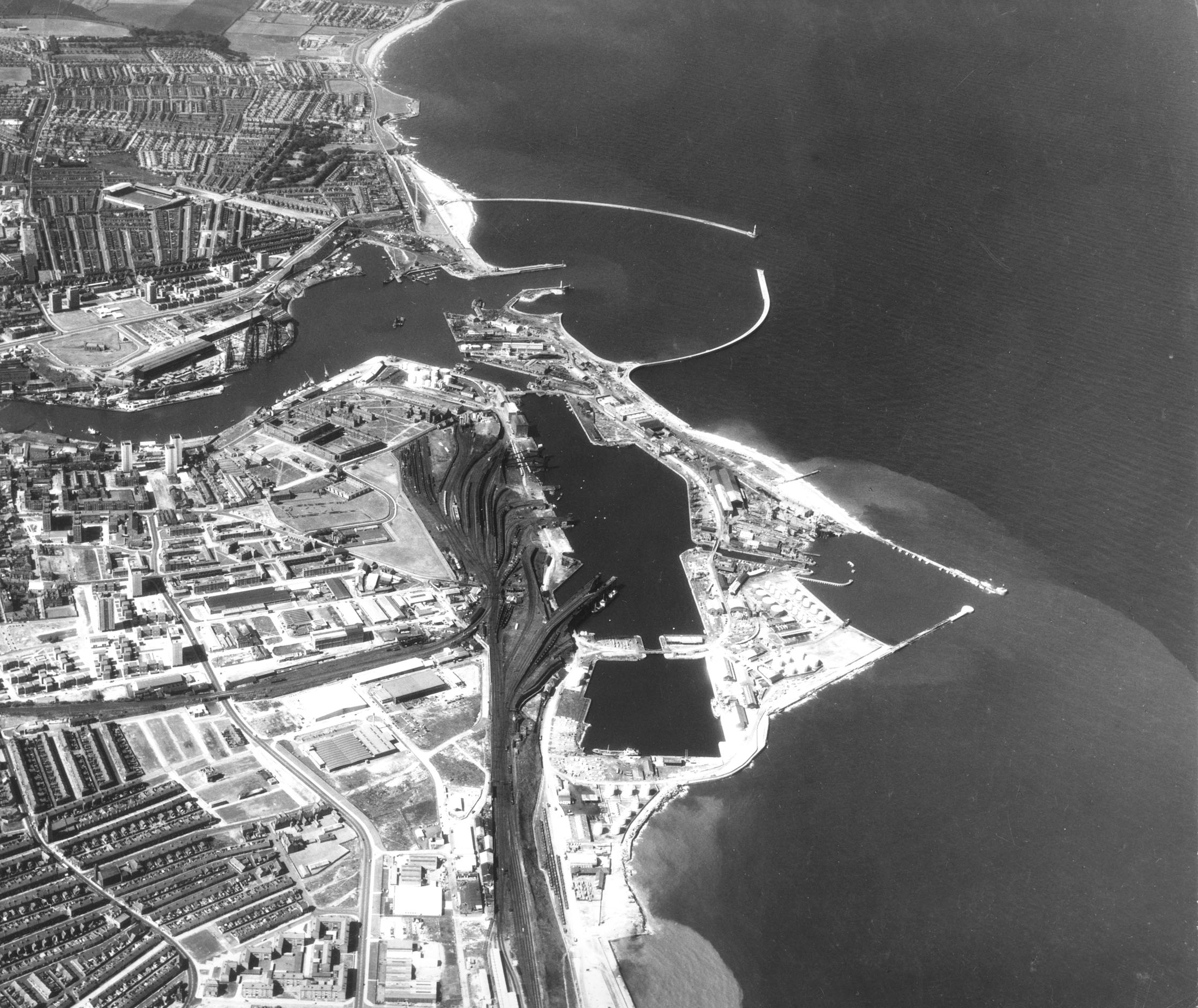
River Wear (top) in 1969, with Hudson Dock, Hendon Dock, and associated railway links to the south

In 1854 the Londonderry, Seaham & Sunderland Railway opened linking collieries to a separate set of staiths at Hudson Dock South, it also provided a passenger service from Sunderland to Seaham Harbour.

In 1886–90 Sunderland Town Hall was built in Fawcett Street, just to the east of the railway station, to a design by Brightwen Binyon. By 1889 two million tons of coal per year was passing through Hudson Dock, while to the south of Hendon Dock, the Wear Fuel Works distilled coal tar to produce pitch, oil and other products.

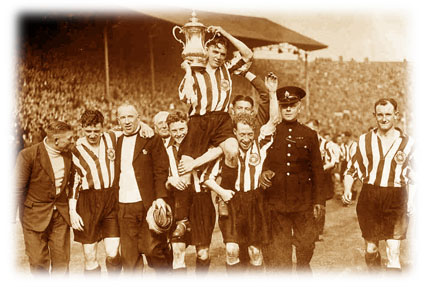
FA Cup winners, Wembley, 1937

The 20th century saw Sunderland A.F.C. established as the Wearside area's greatest claim to sporting fame. Founded in 1879 as Sunderland and District Teachers A.F.C. by schoolmaster James Allan, Sunderland joined The Football League for the 1890–91 season.

=== 20th century ===
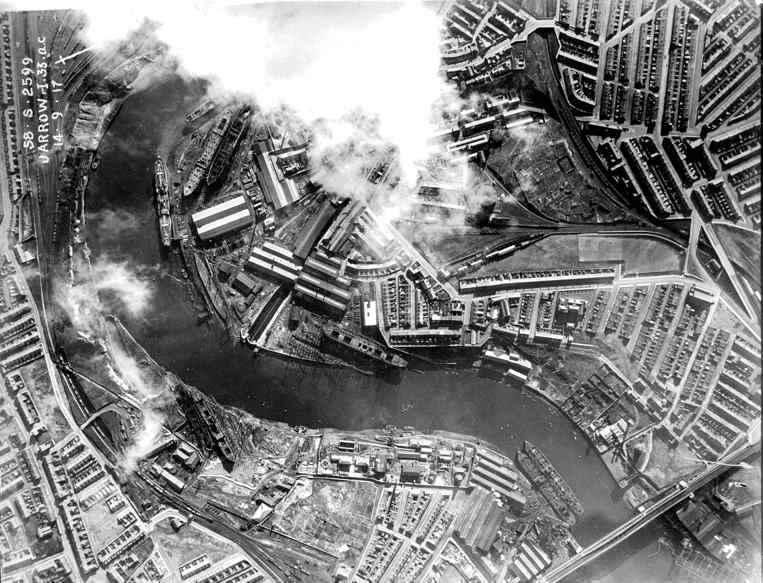
Sunderland in 1917

From 1900 to 1919, an electric tram system was built and was gradually replaced by buses during the 1940s before being ended in 1954. In 1909 the Queen Alexandra Bridge was built, linking Deptford and Southwick.

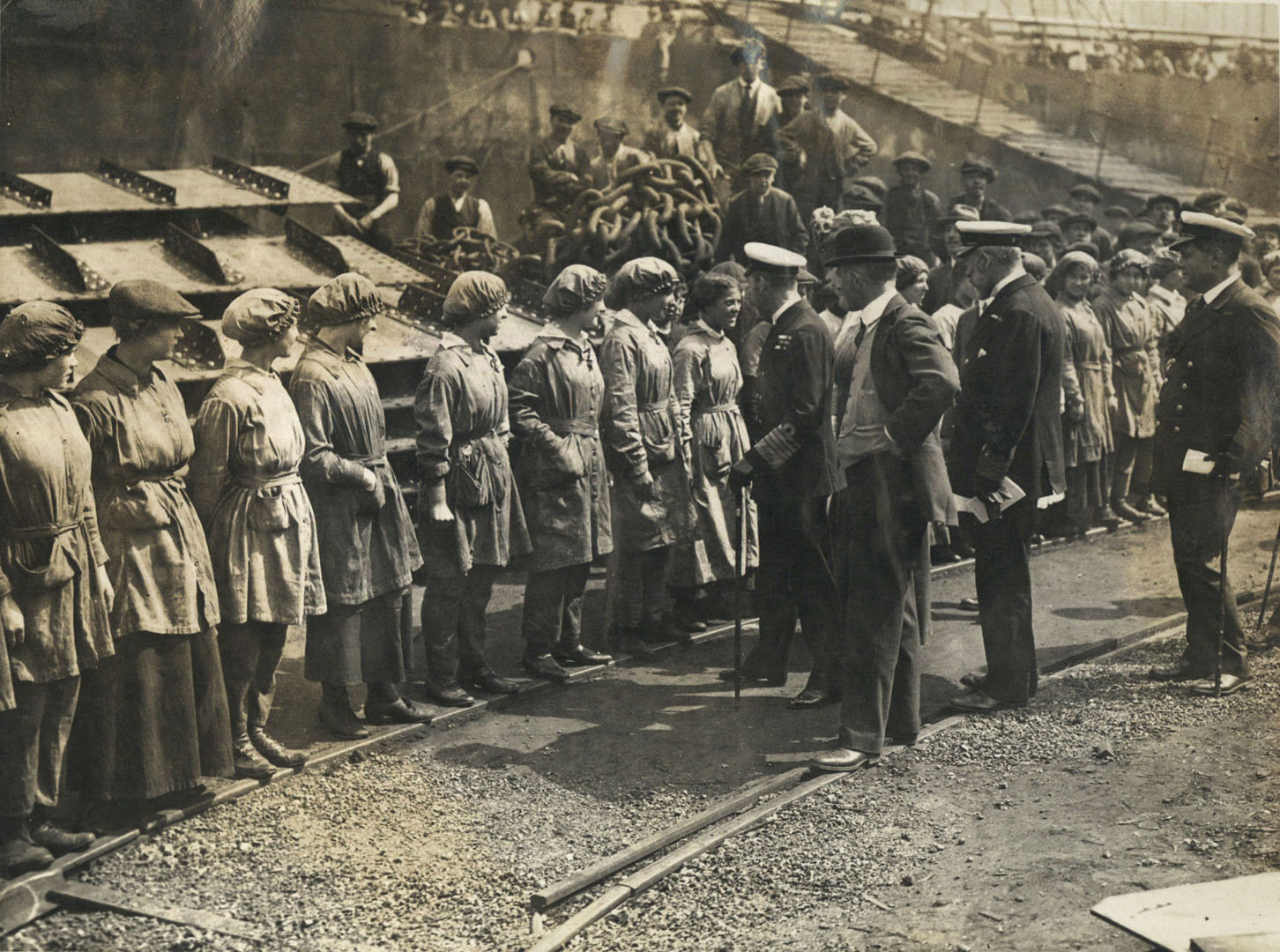
King George V visiting women workers at Sir James Laing & Sons shipyard, 15 June 1917

The First World War increased shipbuilding, leading to the town being a target in a 1916 Zeppelin raid. Monkwearmouth was struck on 1 April 1916 and 22 people died. Over 25,000 men from a population of 151,000 served in the armed forces during the war.

Through the Great Depression of the 1930s, shipbuilding dramatically declined: shipyards on the Wear went from 15 in 1921 to six in 1937. The small yards of J. Blumer & Son (at North Dock) and the Sunderland Shipbuilding Co. Ltd. (at Hudson Dock) both closed in the 1920s, and other yards were closed down by National Shipbuilders Securities in the 1930s.

By 1936 Sunderland AFC had been league champions on six occasions. They won their first FA Cup in 1937.

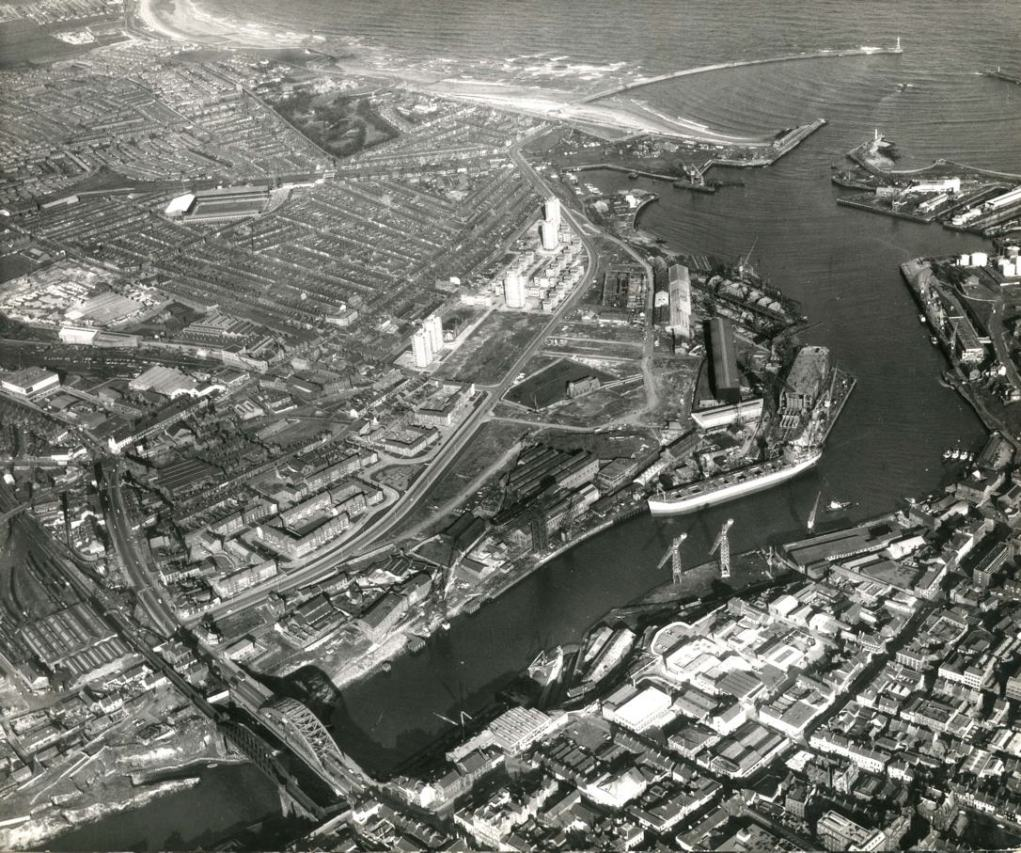
Sunderland viewed from above in 1967

With the outbreak of World War II in 1939, Sunderland was a key target of the German Luftwaffe bombing. Luftwaffe raids resulted in the deaths of 267 people and destruction of local industry while 4,000 homes were also damaged or destroyed.

Many old buildings remain despite the bombing that occurred during World War II. Religious buildings include Holy Trinity Church, built in 1719 for an independent Sunderland, St Michael's Church, built as Bishopwearmouth Parish Church and now known as Sunderland Minster and St Peter's Church, Monkwearmouth, part of which dates from 674 AD, and was the original monastery. St Andrew's Church, Roker, known as the "Cathedral of the Arts and Crafts Movement", contains work by William Morris, Ernest Gimson and Eric Gill. St Mary's Catholic Church is the earliest surviving Gothic revival church in the city. After the war, more housing was built and the town's boundaries expanded in 1967 when neighbouring Ryhope, Silksworth, Herrington, South Hylton and Castletown were incorporated. Sunderland AFC won their only post-World War II major honour in 1973 when they won a second FA Cup.

Shipbuilding ended in 1988 and coal-mining in 1993 after a mid-1980s unemployment crisis with 20 per cent of the local workforce unemployed.

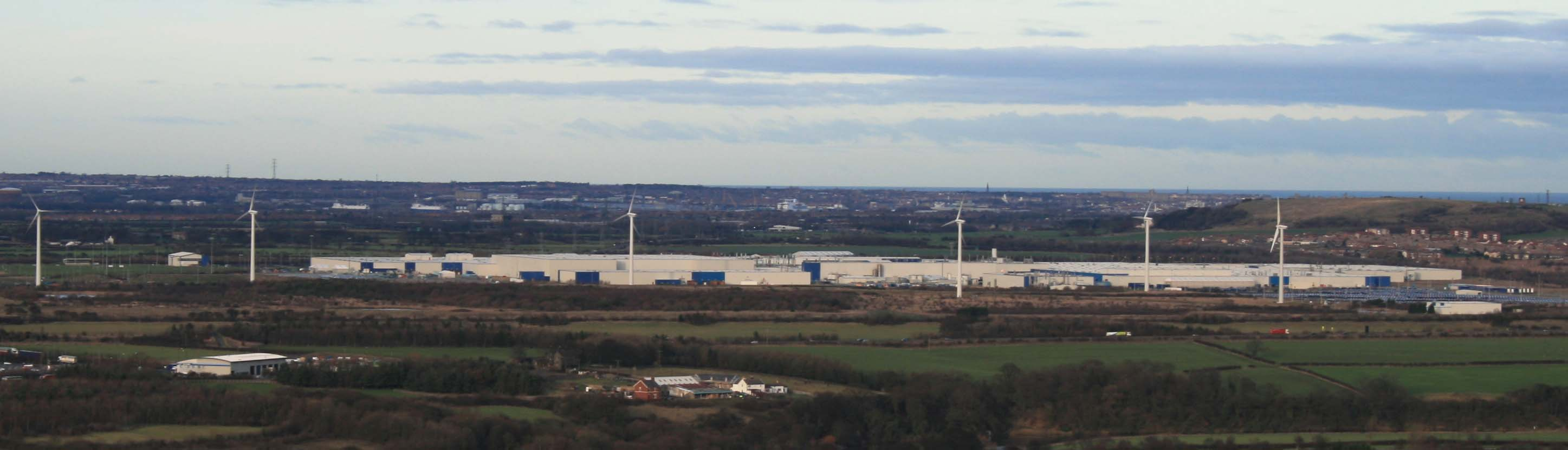
Nissan Motor Manufacturing UK Ltd in Sunderland. Factory complex, including wind turbines, taken from Penshaw Monument.

Electronic, chemical, paper and motor manufacturing as well as the service sector expanded during the 1980s and 1990s to fill unemployment from heavy industry. In 1986 Japanese car manufacturer Nissan opened its Nissan Motor Manufacturing UK factory in Washington, which has since become the UK's largest car factory.

=== City status ===
Sunderland received city status in 1992. Like many cities, Sunderland comprises a number of areas with their own distinct histories, Fulwell, Monkwearmouth, Roker, and Southwick on the northern side of the Wear, and Bishopwearmouth and Hendon to the south. From 1990, the Wear's riverbanks were regenerated with new housing, retail parks and business centres on former shipbuilding sites; the National Glass Centre a new University of Sunderland campus on the St Peter's site were also built. The former Vaux Breweries site on the north west fringe of the city centre was cleared for further development opportunities.

After 99 years at the historic Roker Park stadium, the city's football club, Sunderland AFC moved to the 42,000-seat Stadium of Light on the banks of the River Wear in 1997. At the time, it was the largest stadium built by an English football club since the 1920s, and has since been expanded to hold nearly 50,000 seated spectators.

On 24 March 2004, the city adopted Benedict Biscop as its patron saint. In 2018 the city was ranked as the best to live and work in the UK by the finance firm OneFamily. In the same year, the city was ranked as one of the top 10 safest in the UK.

== Government ==
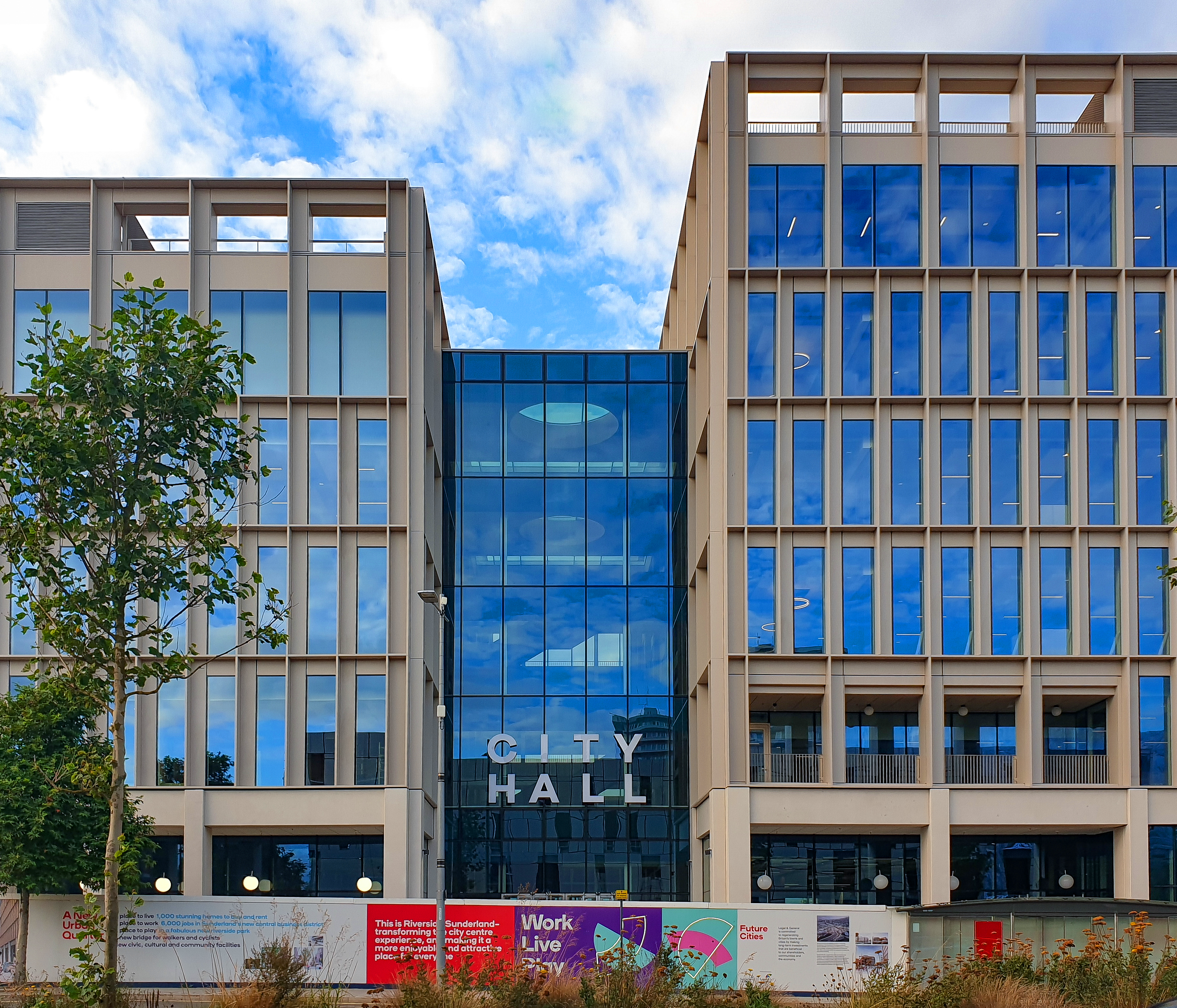
City Hall, meeting place of the City Council

Sunderland is a metropolitan borough with city status, governed by Sunderland City Council. There are three civil parishes within the city boundaries, at Hetton, Burdon, and Warden Law, which form an additional tier of local government for their areas. The rest of the city is an unparished area.

The city council is based at City Hall on Plater Way (formerly the site of the Vaux Brewery), which opened in 2021. Prior to that the council was based at the Civic Centre on Burdon Road, which had been built in 1970.

=== Administrative history ===
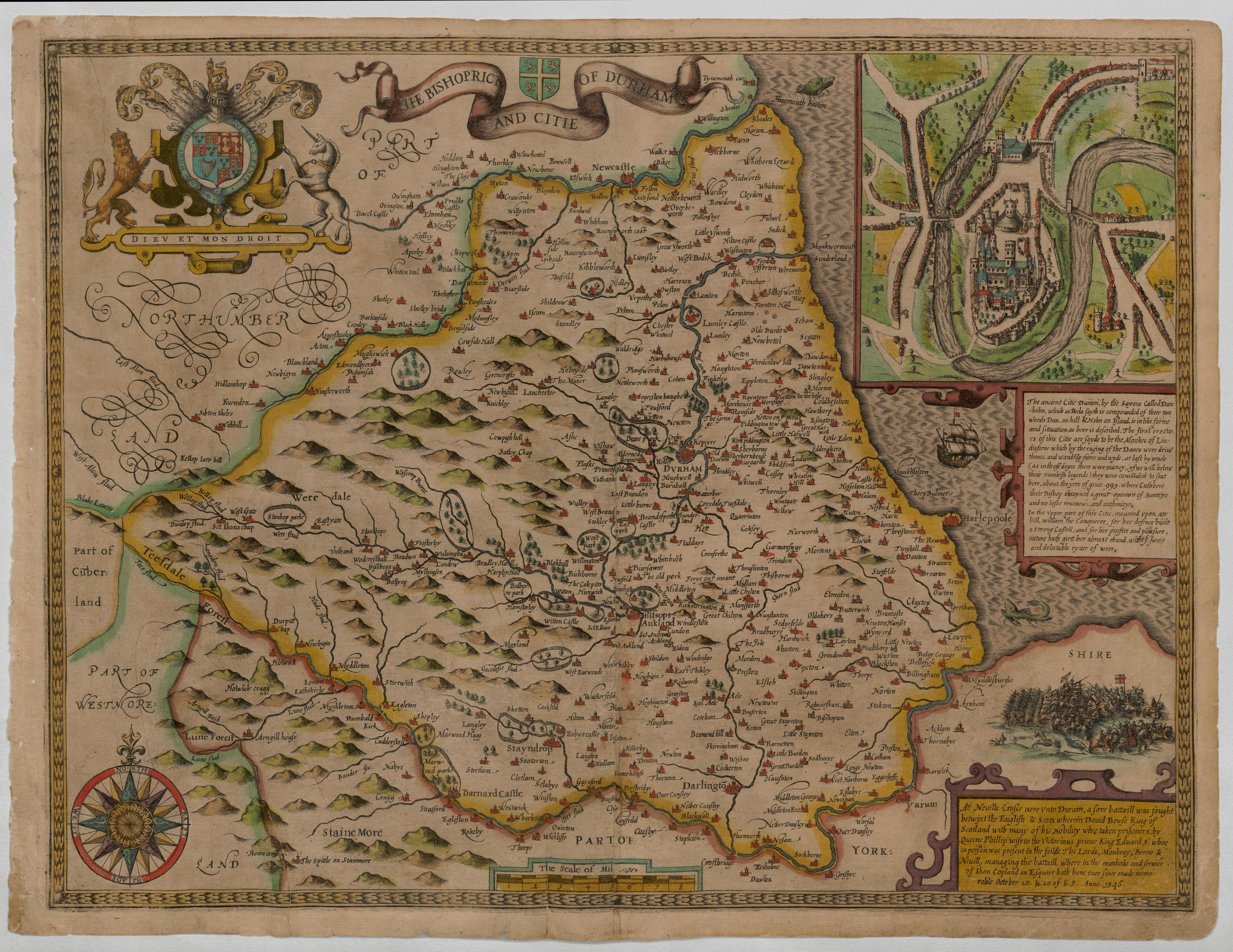
Historic map of County Durham. Sunderland was part of County Durham until the local government changes in 1974.

The original settlement of Sunderland was historically part of the ancient parish of Bishopwearmouth in County Durham. It was an ancient borough, having been granted a charter in 1179 under the name of 'Wearmouth'. The original borough covered a relatively small area in the north-east corner of the old Bishopwearmouth parish, lying on the south side of the mouth of the River Wear. The borough was granted a further charter in 1634 which gave it the right to appoint a mayor and incorporated the town under the name of Sunderland rather than Wearmouth. The area of the borough was made a separate parish from Bishopwearmouth by an act of Parliament, the Sunderland Parish Act 1719 (5 Geo. 1. c. 19 Pr.).

The ancient borough's powers were relatively modest. Unlike most such boroughs, it did not hold its own courts, nor did it have any meaningful municipal functions. A separate body of improvement commissioners was established in 1810 with responsibilities to pave, light and clean the streets, provide a watch, and improve the market. In 1832 a parliamentary borough (constituency) of Sunderland was created, covering the parishes or townships of Sunderland, Bishopwearmouth, Bishopwearmouth Panns, Monkwearmouth, Monkwearmouth Shore and Southwick.

In 1836 Sunderland was reformed to become a municipal borough under the Municipal Corporations Act 1835, which standardised how most boroughs operated across the country. The municipal boundaries were enlarged at the same time to match the constituency, although later that year the municipal boundaries were reduced to remove Southwick and the parts of Bishopwearmouth and Bishopwearmouth Panns which fell more than one mile from the centre of Wearmouth Bridge. The improvement commissioners were wound up in 1851 and their functions transferred to the council.

When elected county councils were established in 1889, Sunderland was considered large enough to provide its own county-level services, and so it was made a county borough, independent from the new Durham County Council. The borough boundaries were enlarged on several occasions, notably in 1867, 1928 (when it gained areas including Fulwell, Southwick and the remainder of the old Bishopwearmouth parish), 1936, 1951, and 1967 (when it gained North Hylton, South Hylton, Ryhope, Silksworth, and Tunstall).

In 1974 the county borough was replaced by a larger metropolitan borough within the new county of Tyne and Wear. The borough gained Hetton-le-Hole, Houghton-le-Spring, Washington, Burdon, and Warden Law.

From 1974 until 1986 the borough council was a lower-tier district authority, with Tyne and Wear County Council providing county-level services. The county council was abolished in 1986, with the borough council taking on county-level functions. Some functions are provided across Tyne and Wear by joint committees with the other districts. The county of Tyne and Wear continues to exist as a ceremonial county for the purposes of lieutenancy, but has had no administrative functions since 1986. The borough of Sunderland was awarded city status in 1992.

Between 2014 and 2024, Sunderland was part of the North East Combined Authority. Since 2024 the council has been a member of the North East Mayoral Combined Authority, which replaced the previous combined authority.

=== UK Parliament ===
As of 2024 Sunderland is represented in the House of Commons in the Parliament of the United Kingdom by three Labour Members of Parliament; Bridget Phillipson since 2020, Lewis Atkinson since 2024 and Sharon Hodgson since 2005.

Houghton and Sunderland South	Sunderland Central	Washington and Gateshead South
Bridget Phillipson	Lewis Atkinson	Sharon Hodgson
Labour Party	Labour Party	Labour Party

=== EU referendum ===
Sunderland voted for Brexit in the 2016 referendum on European Union membership by 61% of the vote; an unexpectedly high margin. The New Statesman and The Daily Telegraph have described Sunderland as the poster city for Brexit.

== Geography ==
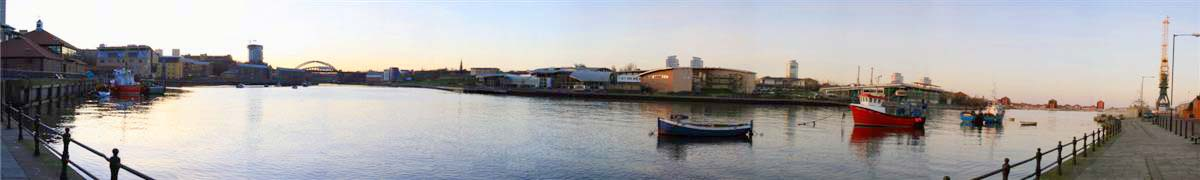
Sunderland riverside at sunset

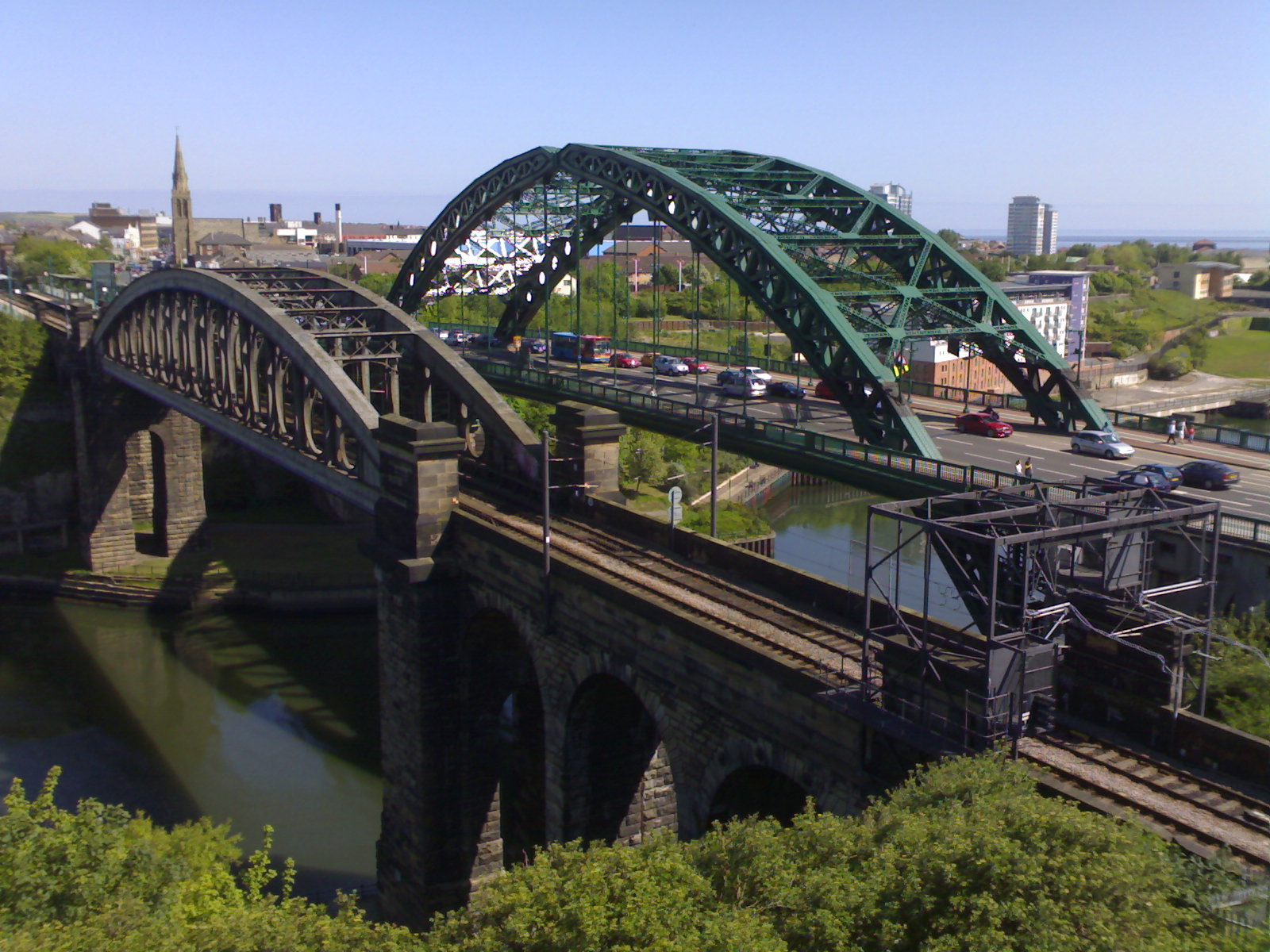
The Wearmouth Bridge (right) and railway bridge (left). This road was the route of the old A19, now it is the A1018.

Much of the city is located on a low range of hills running parallel to the coast. On average, it is around 80 metres above sea level. Sunderland is divided by the River Wear which passes through the middle of the city in a deeply incised valley, part of which is known as the Hylton gorge. Several smaller bodies of water, such as Hendon Burn and the Barnes Burn, run through the suburbs. The three road bridges connecting the north and south portions of the city are the Queen Alexandra Bridge at Pallion, the Wearmouth Bridge just to the north of the city centre and most recently the Northern Spire Bridge between Castletown and Pallion. A pedestrian and cycle bridge called the Keel Crossing was constructed between 2023 and 2025. To the west of the city, the Hylton Viaduct carries the A19 dual-carriageway over the Wear (see map below).

The city has a number of public parks. Several of these are historic, including Mowbray Park, Roker Park and Barnes Park. In the early 2000s, Herrington Country Park was opened opposite Penshaw Monument. The city's parks have secured several awards for its commitment to preserving natural facilities, receiving the Britain in Bloom collective in 1993, 1997 and 2000.

Approximately 70% of the population of the built-up area lives on the south side of the river and 30% on the north side. The built-up area extends to the seafront at Hendon and Ryhope in the south and Seaburn in the north.

=== Green belt ===
The built-up area is surrounded by the Tyne and Wear Green Belt, with its portion in much of its surrounding rural area of the borough. It is a part of the local development plan, of which its stated aims are as follows:

A Green Belt will be maintained which will:-

(i) Check the unrestricted sprawl of the built up area of Sunderland;
(ii) Assist in safeguarding the city's countryside from further encroachment;
(iii) Assist in the regeneration of the urban area of the city;
(iv) Preserve the setting and special character of Springwell Village;

(iv) Prevent the merging of Sunderland with Tyneside, Washington, Houghton-le-Spring and Seaham, and the merging of Shiney Row with Washington, Chester-le-Street and Bournmoor.

In the Sunderland borough boundary, as well as the aforementioned areas, landscape features and facilities such as much of the River Don and Wear basins, the George Washington Hotel Golf and Spa complex, Sharpley Golf Course, Herrington Country Park, Houghton Quarry and Penshaw Hill are within the green belt area.

=== Climate ===
Sunderland has a temperate oceanic climate (Köppen: Cfb). Its location in the rain shadow of the Pennines, as well as other mountain ranges to the west, such as those of the Lake District and southwestern Scotland, make Sunderland one of the least rainy cities of Northern England. The climate is heavily moderated by the adjacent North Sea, giving it cool summers, and winters that are mild considering its latitude. The closest weather station is in Tynemouth, about 8 miles (13 km) north of Sunderland. As a result, Sunderland's coastline is likely slightly milder given the more southerly position. Another relatively nearby weather station in Durham has warmer summer days and colder winter nights courtesy of its inland position.

Climate data for Tynemouth, 1981–2010
Month	Jan	Feb	Mar	Apr	May	Jun	Jul	Aug	Sep	Oct	Nov	Dec	Year
Mean daily maximum °C (°F)	7.2 (45.0)	7.3 (45.1)	9.0 (48.2)	10.3 (50.5)	12.7 (54.9)	15.6 (60.1)	18.1 (64.6)	18.1 (64.6)	16.1 (61.0)	13.2 (55.8)	9.7 (49.5)	7.4 (45.3)	12.1 (53.8)
Mean daily minimum °C (°F)	2.2 (36.0)	2.2 (36.0)	3.3 (37.9)	4.8 (40.6)	7.2 (45.0)	10.0 (50.0)	12.3 (54.1)	12.3 (54.1)	10.4 (50.7)	7.7 (45.9)	4.9 (40.8)	2.5 (36.5)	6.7 (44.1)
Average precipitation mm (inches)	45.5 (1.79)	37.8 (1.49)	43.9 (1.73)	45.4 (1.79)	43.2 (1.70)	51.9 (2.04)	47.6 (1.87)	59.6 (2.35)	53.0 (2.09)	53.6 (2.11)	62.8 (2.47)	52.9 (2.08)	597.2 (23.51)
Average precipitation days (≥ 1.0 mm)	9.8	7.6	8.7	8.2	8.3	8.7	8.6	9.2	8.1	10.7	11.6	10.1	109.5
Mean monthly sunshine hours	61.1	81.6	117.7	149.9	191.7	183.0	185.7	174.9	141.1	106.2	70.4	51.9	1,515
Source: Met Office

== Demography ==
Population pyramid of the City of Sunderland in 2020

=== 2021 census ===
At the 2021 census, the built-up area of Sunderland had a population of 168,315, and the wider borough had a population of 274,200. The 2011 census had defined a much larger Sunderland built-up area covering all the built-up areas in the borough and some areas beyond it, notably including Chester-le-Street.

The table below compares Sunderland's ethnic make up to the North East England region.

2021 Census Ethnic Groups	White	Asian, Asian British, Asian Welsh	Black, Black British, Black Welsh, Caribbean or African	Mixed or Multiple ethnic groups	Other ethnic groups
Sunderland	94.6%	3.0%	1.0%	0.9%	0.5%
North East England	93.0%	3.7%	1.0%	1.3%	1.0%

The majority of the BAME population live in Sunderland East – more specifically Hendon and Millfield where there is a larger population of Bangladeshi/Bangladeshi British and Indian/Indian British than elsewhere. There is also a significant Chinese population in these areas. Sunderland West has a population of Indian, Pakistani and other Asian ethnicities. Sunderland North has a substantial Chinese population, notably in St.Peter's. This is believed to be influenced by the student population in which:

- 147 nationalities are represented
- 51.27% students are White, 13.92% Asian, 12.78% Asian Other and 5.12% Black African, with other ethnicities in much smaller numbers

While BAME populations are more concentrated in some areas within Sunderland, ethnic diversity is too low in the city to determine if any groups are particularly segregated.

=== Religion ===
Hierarchy
Denomination	Top tier	2nd	3rd	4th
Church of England	Province of York	Diocese of Durham	Archdeaconry of Sunderland	Deanery of Wearmouth
Roman Catholic	Archdiocese of Liverpool	Diocese of Hexham and Newcastle	Sunderland and East Durham Vicariate	
Methodist	District of Newcastle-upon-Tyne		Circuit of Sunderland	

The 2011 census recorded that 70.2% of the population identified as Christian, 1.32% as Muslim, 0.29% as Sikh, 0.22% as Hindu, 0.19% as Buddhist, 0.02% as Jewish, and 21.90% as having no religion.

The Stake Center for the Sunderland Stake of The Church of Jesus Christ of Latter-Day Saints is in Sunderland.

Jewish heritage in the city, once part of a thriving community, can be dated back to around 1750, when a number of Jewish merchants from across the UK and Europe settled in Sunderland, eventually forming a congregation in 1768. A rabbi from Holland was established in the city in 1790. After a rapid growth in numbers during the latter half of the nineteenth century, the Jewish community in Sunderland reached its height in the mid-1930s, when around 2,000 Jews were recorded to be living in the town. The community has been in slow decline since the mid-20th century. Many Sunderland Jews left for stronger Jewish communities in Britain, including Gateshead, or to Israel. The Jewish primary school, the Menorah School, closed in July 1983, and the yeshiva moved to Gateshead in June 1988. The synagogue on Ryhope Road, opened in 1928, closed at the end of March 2006. (See also History of the Jews in North East England.) The Jewish population of the Sunderland Metropolitan Borough is continually diminishing, as the Jewish population fell from 114 people in 2001, to 87 people in 2021.

In 1998, following the grant of city status to Sunderland, the erstwhile parish church of Bishopwearmouth (St Michael's) was redesignated as Sunderland Minster with a city-wide role. It was believed to have been the first creation of a minster church in England since the Reformation.

==== Pentecostalism ====
The Reverend Alexander Boddy (1854–1930) was appointed vicar of All Saints' Church, Monkwearmouth in 1884. During his ministry at Monkwearmouth, Boddy was influenced by the 1904–1905 Welsh revival and also by the British-born Norwegian preacher Thomas Ball Barratt. In the early years of the 20th century All Saints, Monkwearmouth became an important centre for the development of the Pentecostal Movement in Britain.

== Economy ==
Following the industrial decline of the 1970s to early 1980s and collapse of the local shipbuilding industry, Sunderland's mid-1980s economic situation began to improve. Japanese car manufacturer Nissan opened the Nissan Motor Manufacturing UK factory in 1986, and the first Nissan Bluebird car was produced later that year. The factory and its supplier companies remain the largest employers in the region, with current cars produced there including the Nissan Qashqai, the Nissan Juke and the electric Nissan LEAF. As of 2012 over 500,000 cars are produced annually, and it is the UK's largest car factory.

Also in the late 1980s, new service industries moved into sites such as the Doxford International Business Park in the south west of the city, attracting national and international companies. Sunderland was named in the shortlist of the top seven "intelligent cities" in the world for the use of information technology, in 2004 and 2005.

=== Regeneration ===
Since the mid-1980s Sunderland has undergone massive regeneration, particularly around the City Centre and the river corridor.

In 2000, the Bridges shopping centre was extended towards Crowtree Road and the former Central Bus Station, attracting national chain stores. This was followed by adjacent redevelopments on Park Lane.

The former shipyards along the Wear were transformed with a mixture of residential, commercial and leisure facilities including St Peter's Campus of the University of Sunderland, university accommodation along the Fish Quay on the South side of the river, the North Haven housing and marina development, the National Glass Centre, the Stadium of Light and Hylton Riverside Retail Park. Also in 2007, the Echo 24 luxury apartments opened on Pann's Bank overlooking the river.

Sunderland Corporation's massive post-war housing estate developments at Farringdon, Pennywell and Grindon have all passed into the ownership of Gentoo Group (previously 'Sunderland Housing Group'), a private company and a Registered Social Landlord.

The Port of Sunderland, owned by the city council, has been allocated for medium-term redevelopment with a focus on mixed-use industry.

Sunderland City Council's Unitary Development Plan (UDP) outlines a number of sites around the city for regeneration. The plans are supported by Sunderland Arc, an urban regeneration company funded by the City council, One NorthEast (defunct) and the Homes and Communities Agency.

Sunniside

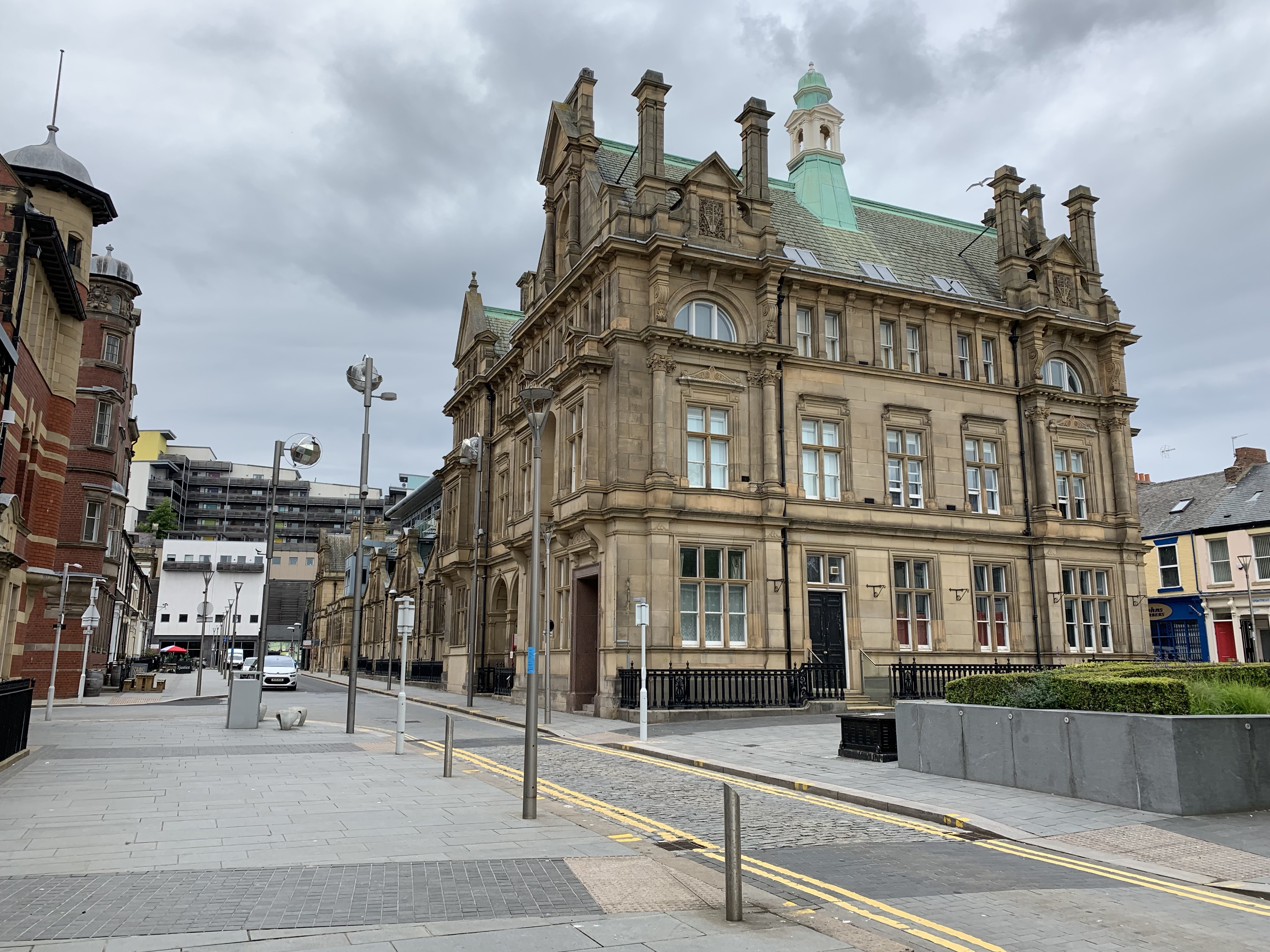
The former General Post Office building on Sunniside Gardens in 2019

In 2004, redevelopment work began in the Sunniside area in the east-end of the city centre, including a multiplex cinema, a multi-storey car park, restaurants, a casino and tenpin bowling. Originally the River Quarter, the site was renamed Limelight in 2005, and renamed in 2008, when it became Sunniside Leisure. Sunniside Gardens were landscaped, and a number of new cafes, bars and restaurants were opened. Up-market residential apartments were developed, including the Echo 24 building.

Vaux development and Keel Square

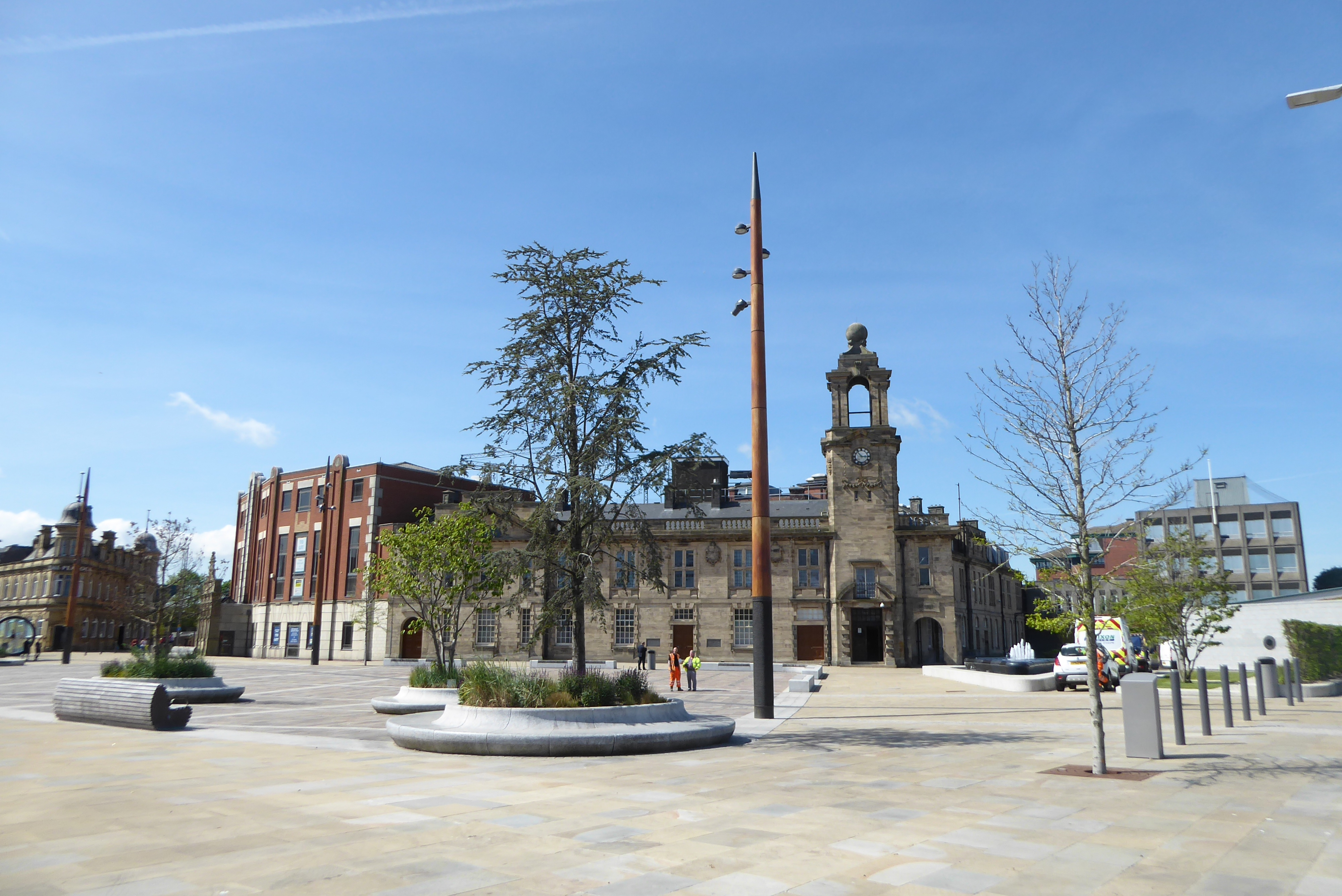
Keel Square in 2017

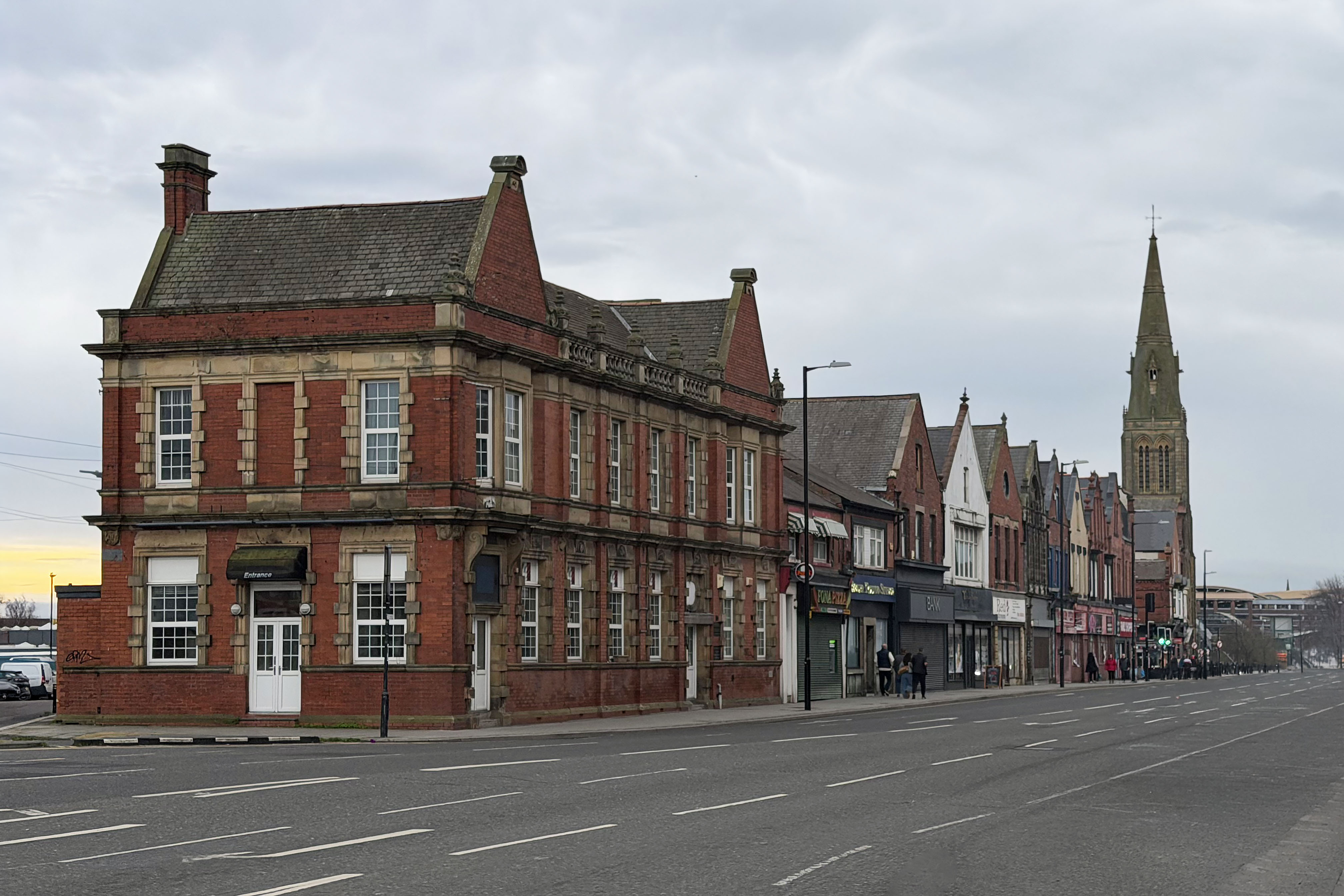
View along North Bridge Street

Following the closure of the Vaux brewery in 1999, a 26-acre (11-hectare) brownfield site lay dormant in the centre of Sunderland. The land was subject to dispute between supermarket chain Tesco, who bought the site in 2001, and Sunderland arc, who submitted plans for its redevelopment in 2002. During formal negotiations, Tesco stated they would be willing to sell the land to arc, if an alternative city centre site could be found. Possibilities include Holmeside Triangle, and the Sunderland Retail Park in Roker. Arc originally hoped to begin development in 2010. Arc's plans for the site were approved by the Secretary of State in 2007, and included extensive office space, hotels, leisure and retail units, residential apartments and a new £50 m Crown and Magistrates' court, along with a central public arcade located under an expansive glass canopy. It was hoped an "evening economy" could be encouraged, to complement the city's nightlife. In 2013 in the area opposite the Vaux site, Sunderland City Council announced the Keel Square project, a new public space designed to commemorate Sunderand's maritime heritage, which was completed in May 2015. Construction commenced in 2014.

Stadium Village

Sunderland A.F.C. has been a major symbol of the area and a contributor to the local economy since the late 19th century. The club was one of the most successful and best supported clubs in the English game during this era, with its home at Roker Park holding more than 70,000 spectators at its peak. However, the FA Cup triumph of 1973 would prove to be the club's only postwar major trophy to date, and after its relegation in 1958 the club frequently bounced between the top two divisions of English football, and in 1987 and again in 2018 suffered relegation to the third tier of English football. The club played at Roker Park for 99 years until the completion of the new Stadium of Light at Monkwearmouth on the banks of the River Wear in 1997. The new stadium seated more than 42,000 on its completion, and has since been expanded to hold some 49,000 spectators. Sunderland's relatively high attendances have been a major boost to the local economy – averaging at more than 30,000 even during the club's most recent spell in the third tier of English football.

Redevelopment of the Monkwearmouth Colliery site, which sits on the north bank of the river Wear opposite the Vaux site, began in the mid-1990s with the creation of the Stadium of Light. In 2008 the Sunderland Aquatic Centre opened adjacent to the Stadium of Light, containing the only Olympic-size swimming pool between Leeds and Edinburgh. The Sheepfolds industrial estate occupies a large area of land between the Stadium and the Wearmouth Bridge. Sunderland Arc were in the process of purchasing land in the Sheepfolds, with a view to relocate the businesses and redevelop the site. The emphasis of development plans included further sporting facilities, in order to create a Sports Village. Other plans included a hotel, residential accommodation, and a footbridge linking the site with the Vaux development.

Grove and Transport Corridor

The Sunderland Strategic Transport Corridor (SSTC) is a proposed transport link from the A19, through the city centre, to the port. A major phase of the plan was the creation of a new bridge, the Northern Spire Bridge, which links the A1231 Wessington Way on the north of the river with the Grove site in Pallion, on the south of the river. In 2008, Sunderland City Council offered the residents of Sunderland the opportunity to vote on the design of the bridge. The choices were a 180-metre (590 ft) iconic cable-stayed bridge, which would result in a temporary increase in council tax, or a simple box structure which would be within the council's budget. The results of the consultation were inconclusive, with residents keen to have an iconic bridge, but reluctant to have a subsequent increase in tax to fund it. Regardless of the ultimate design of the new bridge, the landing point will be the former Grove Cranes site in Pallion. Plans for this site focus around the creation of a new residential area, with homes, community buildings, commercial and retail space.

=== Former ===
==== Major ====
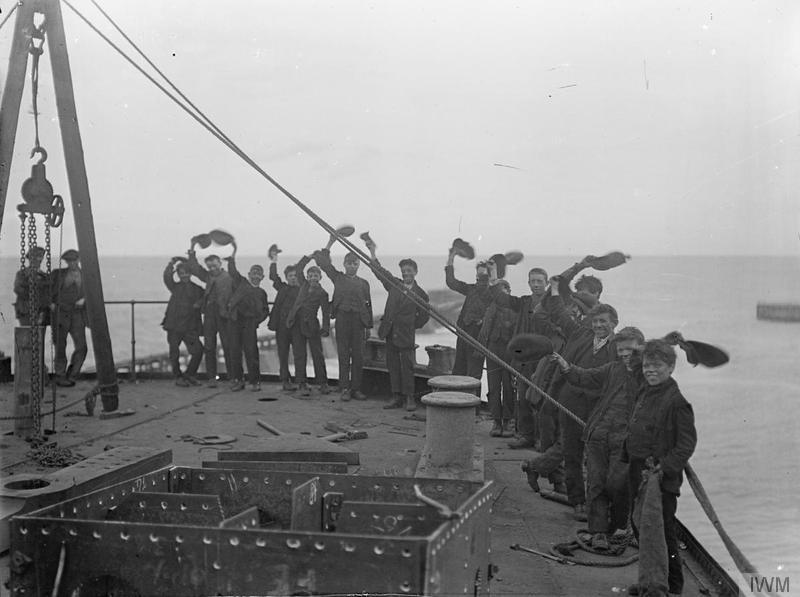
A group of boys who worked on the construction of a Standard ship at a yard in Sunderland during the First World War

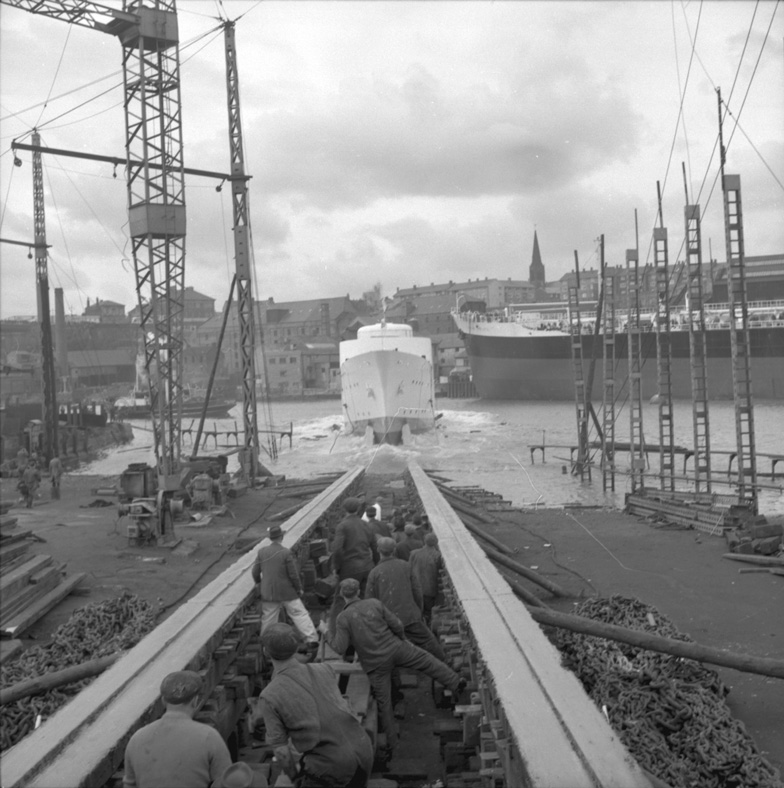
A ship (Radiant II) launched into the River Wear by Austin & Pickersgill, 29 March 1961

Once hailed as the "Largest Shipbuilding Town in the World", ships were built on the Wear from at least 1346 onwards and by the mid-18th century Sunderland was one of the chief shipbuilding towns in the country. Sunderland Docks was the home of operations for the shipbuilding industry on Wearside. The Port of Sunderland was significantly expanded in the 1850s with the construction of Hudson Dock to designs by River Wear Commissioner's Engineer John Murray, with consultancy by Robert Stephenson. One famous vessel was the Torrens, the clipper in which Joseph Conrad sailed, and on which he began his first novel. She was one of the most famous ships of her time and can claim to be the finest ship ever launched from a Sunderland yard.

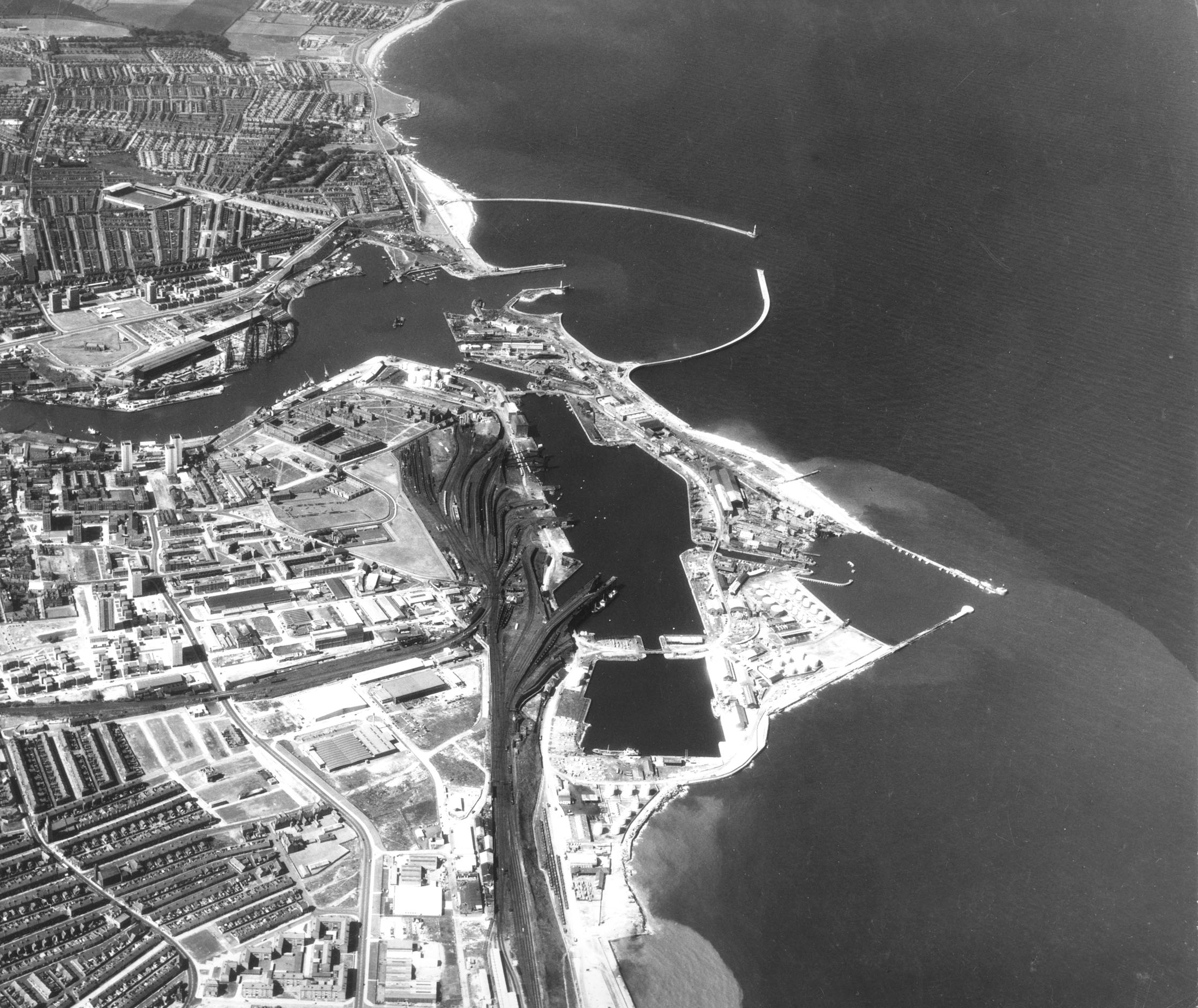
Sunderland Docks in 1969

Between 1939 and 1945 the Wear yards launched 245 merchant ships totalling 1.5 million tons, a quarter of the merchant tonnage produced in the UK at this period. Competition from overseas caused a downturn in demand for Sunderland built ships toward the end of the 20th century. The last shipyard in Sunderland closed on 7 December 1988.

Sunderland, part of the Durham coalfield, has a coal-mining heritage that dates back centuries. At its peak in 1923, 170,000 miners were employed in County Durham alone, as labourers from all over Britain, including many from Scotland and Ireland, entered the region. As demand for coal slipped following World War II, mines began to close across the region, causing mass unemployment. The last coal mine closed in 1994. The site of the last coal mine, Wearmouth Colliery, is now occupied by the Stadium of Light, and a miner's Davy lamp monument stands outside of the ground to honour the site's mining heritage. Documentation relating to the region's coalmining heritage are stored at the North East England Mining Archive and Resource Centre (NEEMARC).

==== Minor ====
The Liebherr crane factory is the last remaining heavy industry on the River Wear in Sunderland.

As with the coal-mining and shipbuilding, overseas competition has forced the closure of all of Sunderland's glass-making factories. Corning Glass Works, in Sunderland for 120 years, closed on 31 March 2007 and in January 2007, the Pyrex manufacturing site also closed, bringing to an end commercial glass-making in the city. However, there has been a modest rejuvenation with the opening of the National Glass Centre which, amongst other things, provides international glass makers with working facilities and a shop to showcase their work, predominantly in the artistic rather than functional field.

In 1855, John Candlish opened a bottleworks, producing glass bottles, with 6 sites at nearby Seaham and at Diamond Hall, Sunderland.

Vaux Breweries was established in the town centre in the 1880s and for 110 years was a major employer. Following a series of consolidations in the British Brewing industry, however, the brewery was finally closed in July 1999. Vaux in Sunderland and Wards in Sheffield had been part of the Vaux Group, but with the closure of both breweries it was re-branded The Swallow Group, concentrating on the hotel side of the business. This was subject to a successful take-over by Whitbread PLC in the autumn of 2000. It is now a brownfield site and this is a derelict site in an urban area.

== Education ==
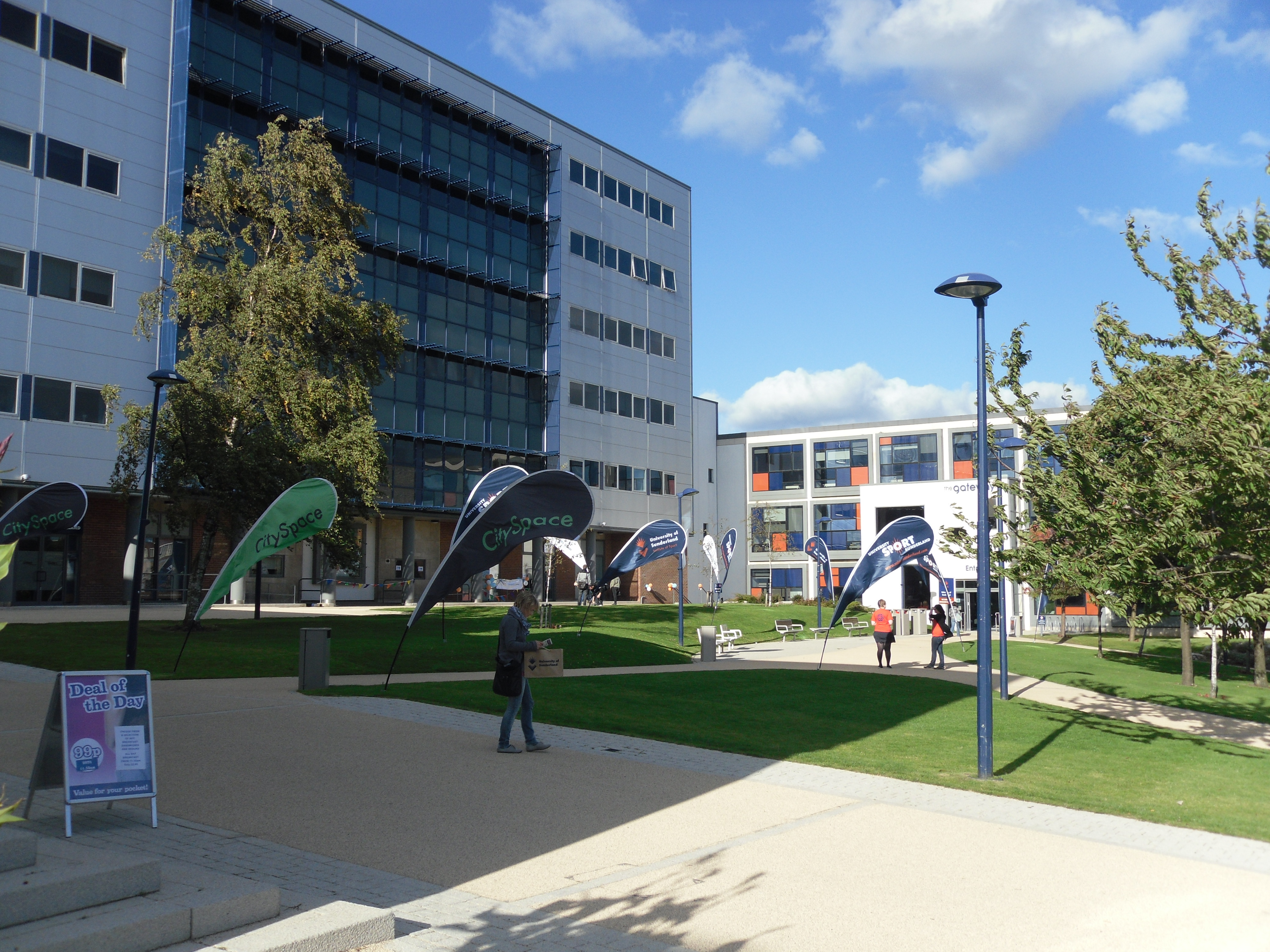
University of Sunderland

Sunderland Polytechnic was founded in 1969, becoming the University of Sunderland in 1992. The institution currently has over 17,000 students. The university is split into two campuses; the City Campus (site of the original Polytechnic) is just to the west of the city centre, as is the main university library and the main administrative buildings. The 'Award-Winning' St Peter's Riverside Campus is located on the north banks of the river Wear, next to the National Glass Centre and houses the School of Business, Law and Psychology, as well as Computing and Technology and The Media Centre. The University of Sunderland was named the top university in England for providing the best student experience by The Times Higher Education Supplement (THES) in 2006. Since 2001 Sunderland has been named the best new university in England by The Guardian and Government performance indicators showed Sunderland as the best new university in England for the quality, range and quantity of its research.

Sunderland College is a further education establishment with campuses located at the Bede centre on Durham Road, Hylton, Doxford International Business Park and 'Phoenix House' in the city centre. It has over 14,000 students, and based on exam results is one of the most successful colleges. St Peter's Sixth Form College, next to St Peter's Church and the university, opened in September 2008. The college is a partnership between the three Sunderland North schools and City of Sunderland College.

There are eighteen secondary schools in the Sunderland area, predominantly comprehensives. According to exam results, the most successful was St Robert of Newminster Catholic School, a coeducational secondary school and sixth form in Washington. However, comprehensive schools also thrive, notably the Roman Catholic single-sex schools St Anthony's (for girls) and St Aidan's (for boys). Both continue to attain high exam results.

There are seventy-six primary schools in Sunderland. According to the 'Value Added' measure, the most successful is Mill Hill Primary School, in Doxford Park.

== Transport ==
=== Heavy and light rail ===
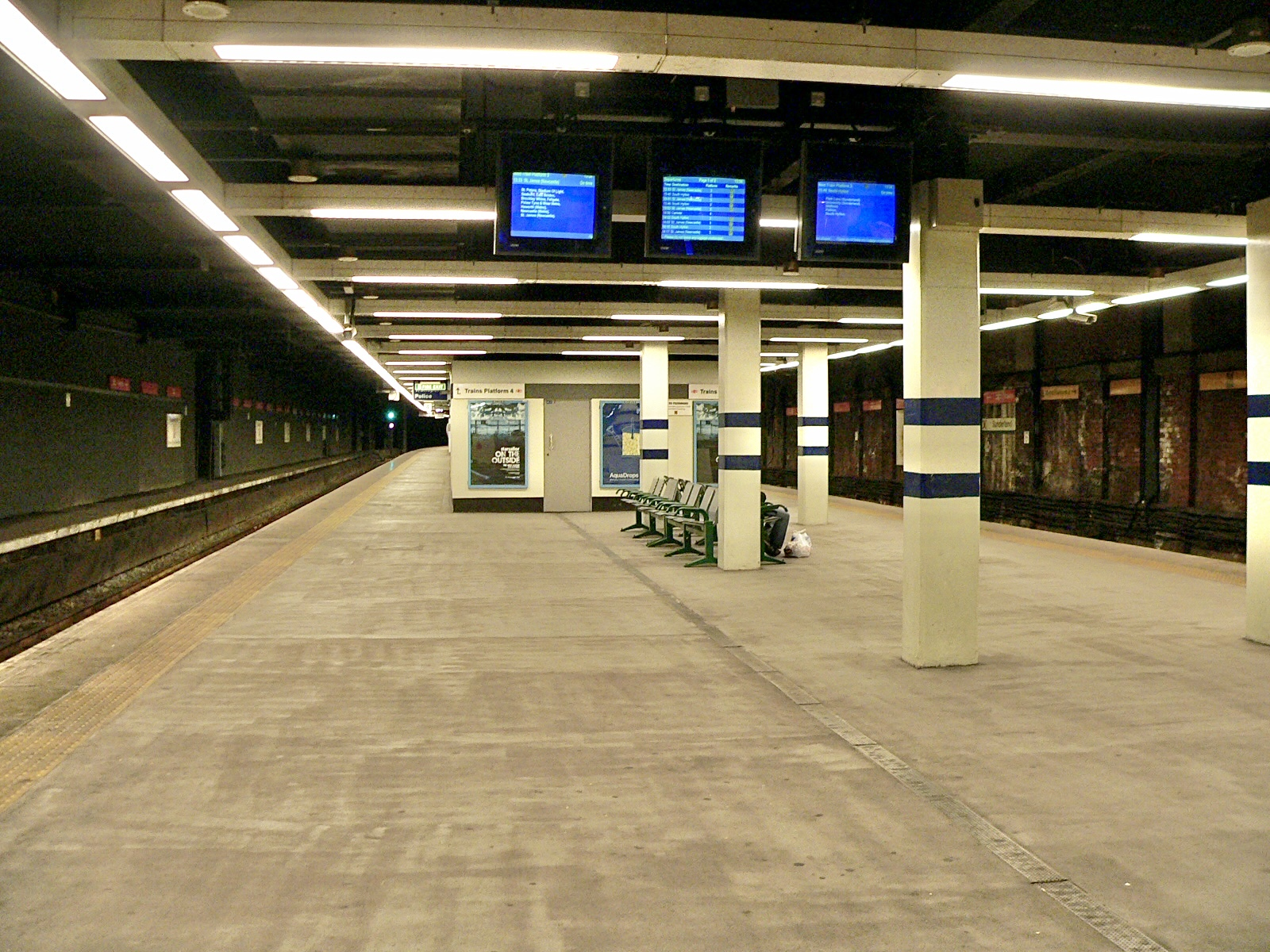
Sunderland railway and Metro station

Sunderland station is served by four train operating companies:

- Grand Central operates five direct inter-city trains to London King's Cross Monday-Saturday, with four on Sunday, taking about 3 hours 30 minutes.
- Northern Trains provides services between Nunthorpe, Middlesbrough, Whitby, Newcastle and Hexham.
- Tyne and Wear Passenger Transport Executive owns and operates the Tyne & Wear Metro, under the Nexus brand. The city has several stops on the Green line between South Hylton and Newcastle Airport, including at Seaburn, Stadium of Light and St Peters before the city's main station with the Park Lane Interchange, University, Millfield and Pallion. Trains run every 12–15 minutes, depending on the time of day, at each of the nine stations.
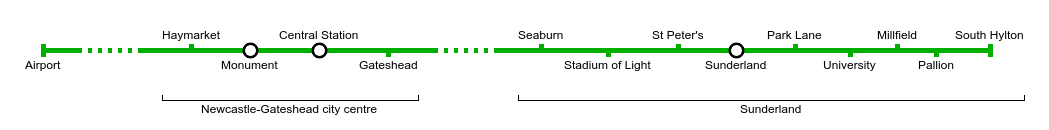
The Green Line simplified with dashed lines for omitted stations

Newcastle is a 30-minute Metro or train ride from Sunderland city centre, which facilitates connecting services to London King's Cross every half hour that take approximately 2 hours 45 minutes. It also provides regular services to Edinburgh Waverley, Glasgow Central, Leeds, Manchester Piccadilly, Liverpool Lime Street, Birmingham New Street and beyond.

Sunderland station opened in 1879 and completely redesigned for England's 1966 World Cup footfall to get to Roker Park. It is underground and became part of the Tyne & Wear Metro in 2002.

In March 2014, Metro owner Nexus proposed an extension of the network by an 'on-street' tram link which would connect north to South Shields and Doxford Park to the west.

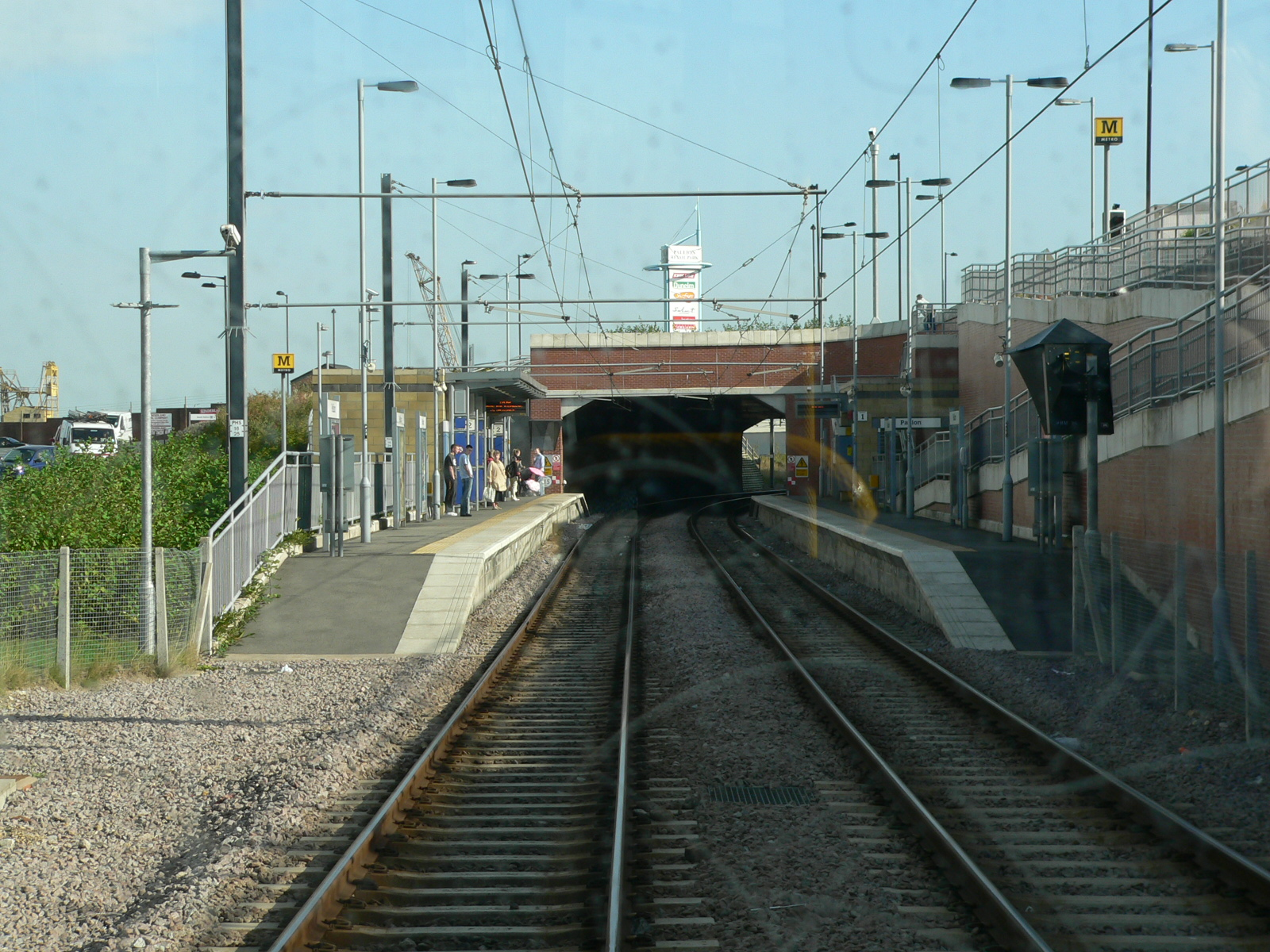
Pallion Metro station

Sunderland railway station's connections
Operators	Services	Lines	Terminus	Other stations
Northern Trains	An hourly service	Durham Coast Line (DCL), Tyne Valley Line and Esk Valley Line	Hexham and Nunthorpe	Newcastle, Hartlepool and Middlesbrough
Grand Central Trains	Five (four on Sunday) trains per day	DCL (south), Northallerton–Eaglescliffe Line and the East Coast Main Line (ECML)	It is a terminus and London Kings Cross	Eaglescliffe, Northallerton, Thirsk and York
Tyne and Wear Metro	Up to five (four on evening and Sunday services) trains per hour on	Green Line	Newcastle Airport and South Hylton	Newcastle

=== Roads ===
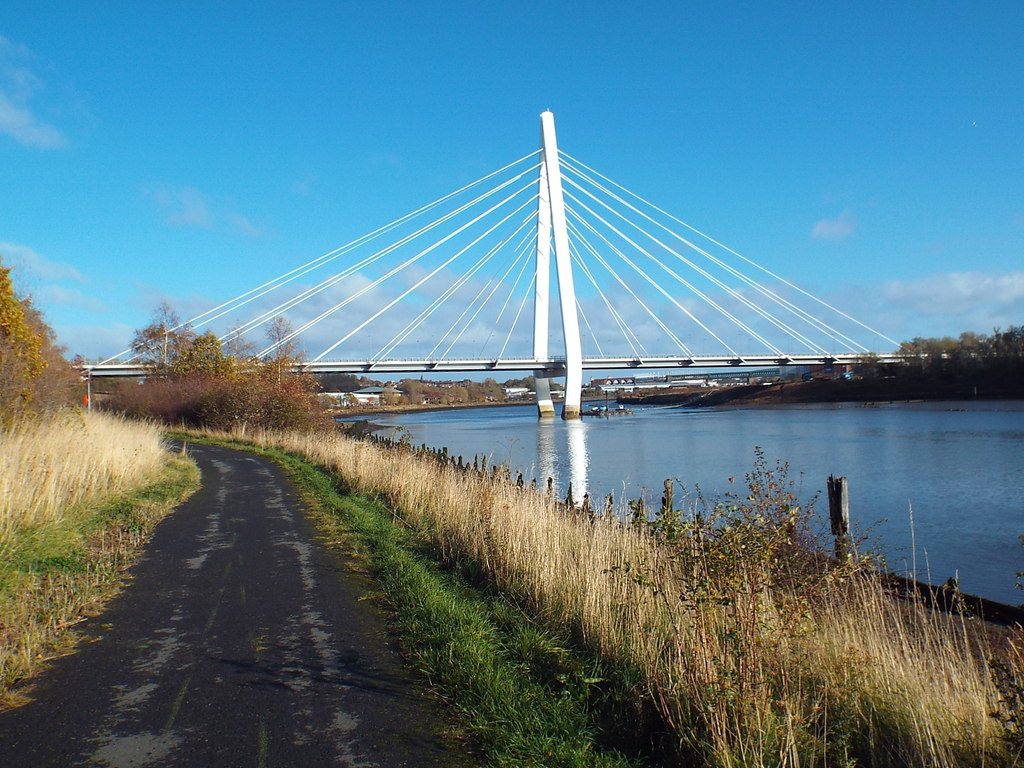
The Northern Spire

Illustration of the main roads through Sunderland

There are five main roads which connect the city:

- The city's main road is the A19, which is a dual carriageway running north-to-south west of the city, crossing the River Wear at Hylton. The road goes links Doncaster with the north of Newcastle upon Tyne and the A1 to Edinburgh; it passes Hartlepool, Stockton-on-Tees, Middlesbrough and York to A168 and the A1M. The A19 originally ran through Sunderland city centre until a bypass was built in the 1970s, renaming the old route to the A1018.
- The A690 Durham Road terminates in the city centre and runs to Crook, County Durham, via the city of Durham.
- The A1231 (Sunderland Highway) begins in the city centre, crosses the Northern Spire Bridge and runs west through Washington to the A1. From the north end of the Northern Spire Bridge to the A19 is a 50 mph limit. From the A19 to the A1 is national speed limit.
- The A1018 and A183 roads both start in the centre of South Shields and enter Sunderland from the north, before merging to cross the Wearmouth Bridge. The A1018 follows a direct route from Shields to Sunderland, the A183 follows the coast. After crossing the bridge, the A1018 follows a relatively straight path to the south of Sunderland where it merges with the A19. The A183 becomes Chester Road and heads west out of the city to the A1 at Chester-le-Street. In Autumn 2007, the Southern Radial Route was opened. This is a bypass of the A1018 through Grangetown and Ryhope – a stretch that commonly suffered from congestion, especially during rush hour. The bypass starts just south of Ryhope and runs parallel to the cliff tops into Hendon, largely avoiding residential areas.

The Sunderland strategic transport corridor project is an ongoing investment to the city's road infrastructure. The scheme improves transport links around the city, ensuring continuous dual carriageway between the A19 road and the port of Sunderland, as well as the Northern Spire bridge built over the Wear between Pallion (south) and Castletown (north).

=== Buses ===
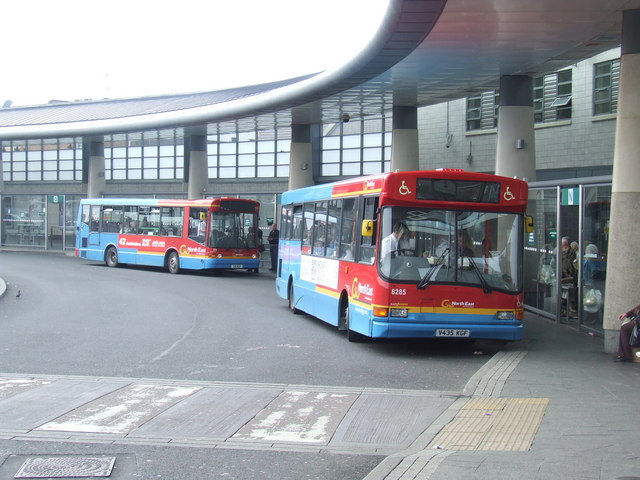
Go North East buses at Park Lane Interchange

The majority of bus services in Sunderland are provided by Stagecoach in Sunderland and Go North East, with a handful of services provided by Arriva North East. Cross-country and inter-city routes are operated mainly by National Express and Flixbus.

A multimillion-pound transport interchange at Park Lane was opened on 2 May 1999 by the then Brookside actor Michael Starke. With 750,000 passengers per year, it is the busiest bus and coach station in Britain after Victoria Coach Station in Central London and has won several awards for innovative design.

A new Metro station was built underneath the bus concourse to provide a direct interchange as part of the extension to South Hylton in 2002.

=== Cycling ===
There are a number of cycle routes that run through and around Sunderland. The National Cycle Network National Route 1 runs from Ryhope in the south, through the centre of the city and then along the coast towards South Shields. Britain's most popular long-distance cycle route – The 'C2C' Sea to Sea Cycle Route – traditionally starts or ends when the cyclist dips their wheel in the sea on Roker beach. The 'W2W' 'Wear-to-Walney' route and the 'Two-Rivers' (Tyne and Wear) route also terminate in Sunderland.

=== Airports ===
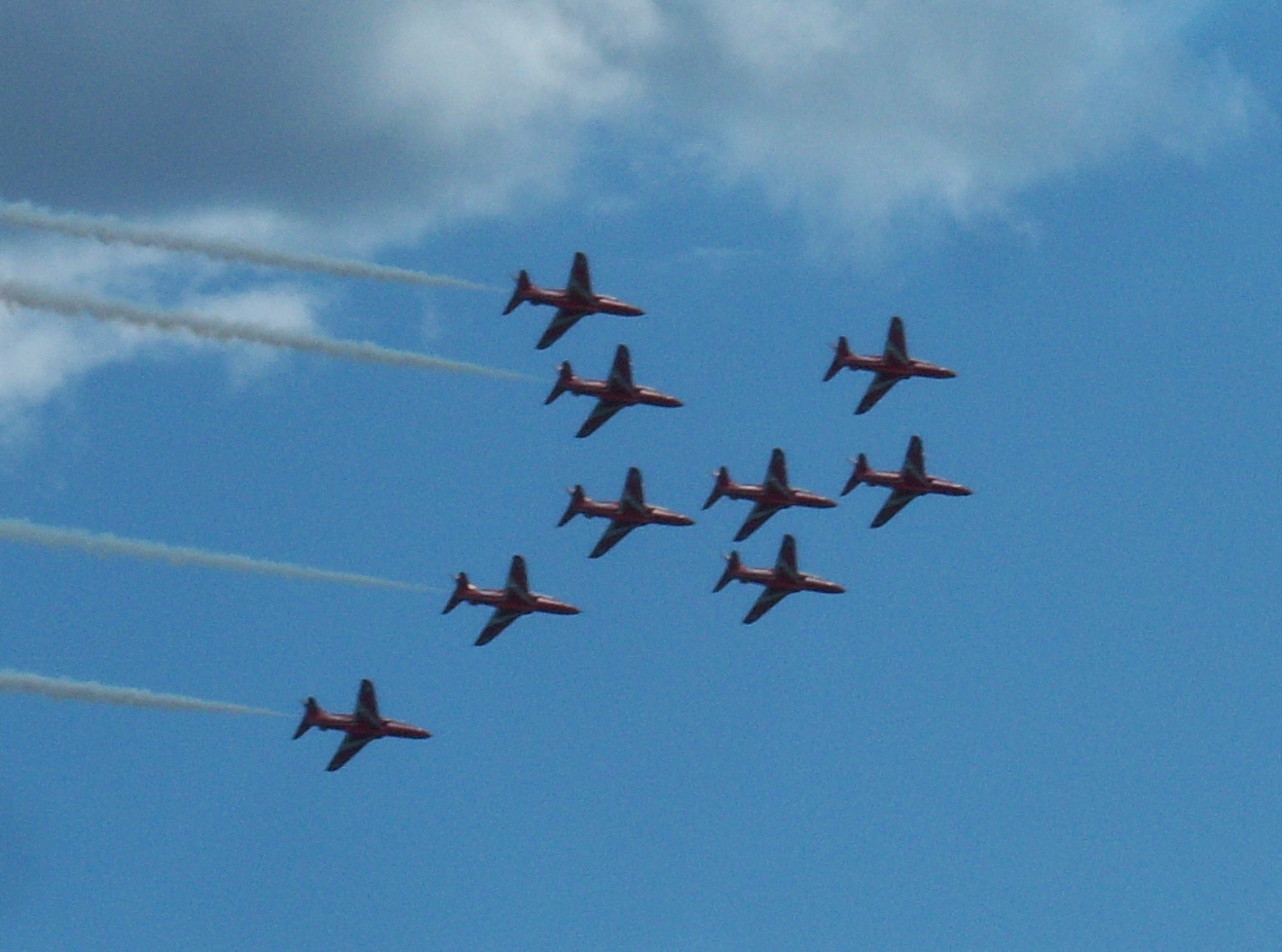
The Red Arrows display team perform at the 2009 Sunderland International Airshow

Newcastle Airport is a 55-minute Metro ride from Sunderland city centre; there is a Metro train connecting with the airport every 12–15 minutes in both directions until about 11 pm, Monday-Sunday.

Teesside International Airport can be reached in less than one hour by car.

Up until 2020, the city hosted the Sunderland International Airshow. It took place along the sea front at Roker and Seaburn.

=== Port ===
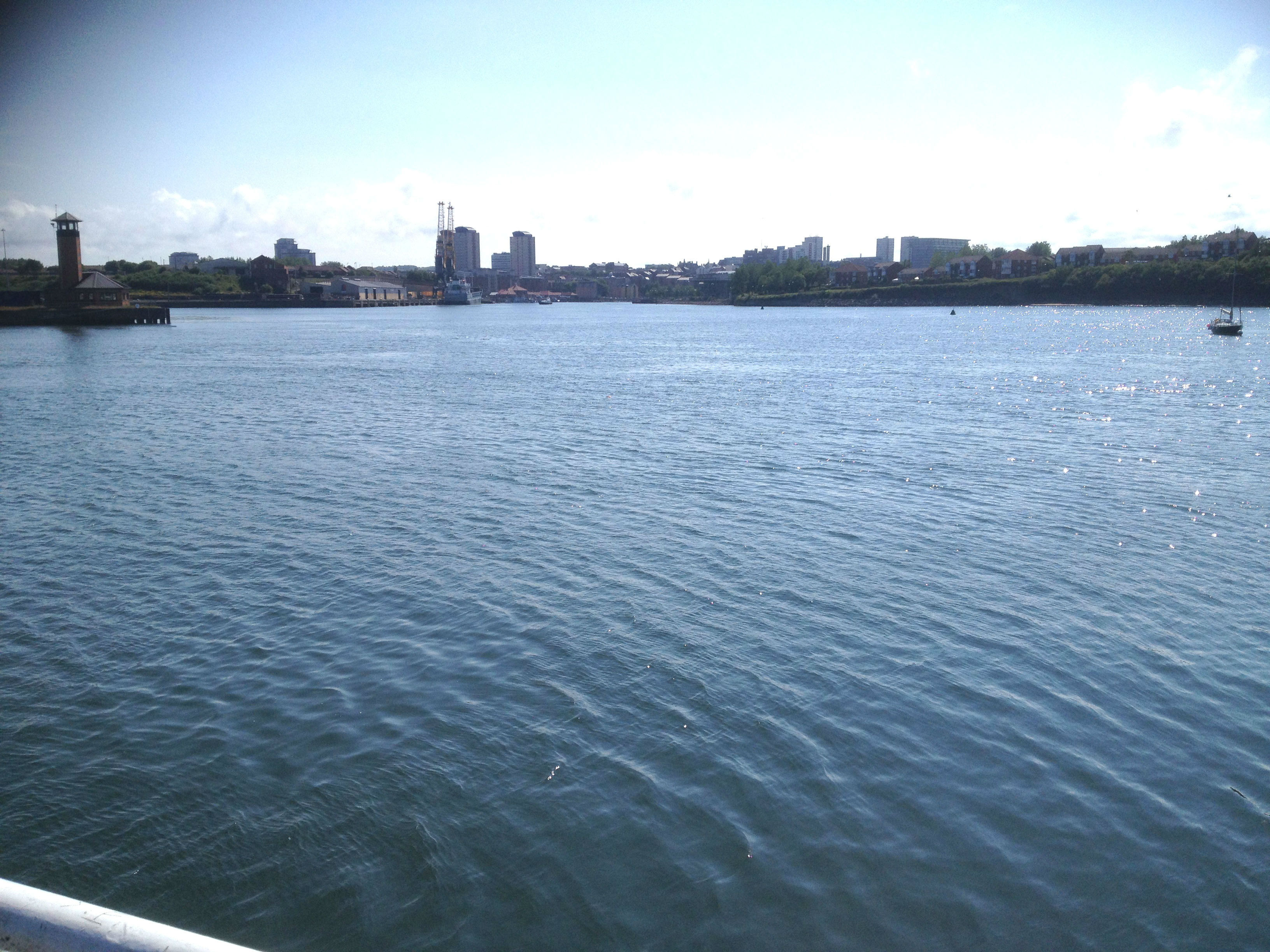
Sunderland harbour viewed from the north dock

The Port of Sunderland is the second largest municipally-owned port in the United Kingdom. The port offers a total of 17 quays, which handle cargoes including forest products, non-ferrous metals, steel, aggregates and refined oil products, limestone, chemicals and maritime cranes. It also handles offshore supply vessels and has ship repair and drydocking facilities.

The river berths are deepwater and tidal, while the South Docks are entered via a lock with an 18.9-metre (62 ft) beam restriction.

== Culture ==
=== Dialect and accent ===
The dialect of Sunderland is known as Mackem, and contains a large amount of vocabulary and distinctive words and pronunciations not used in other parts of the United Kingdom. The Mackem dialect has much of its origins in the language spoken by the Anglo-Saxon population. Although the accent has much in common with Geordie, the dialect spoken in Newcastle, there are some distinctive differences.

A few Sunderland dialect words:

- Nee – No
- Bosh – Problem
- Marra – Mate
- Ha'way – Come on (Not to be confused with Geordie's Howay)
- Knack – Hurt
- Git – Very (Used to emphasise something so 'very good' becomes 'git good')
- Claes – Clothes

=== Attractions and events ===
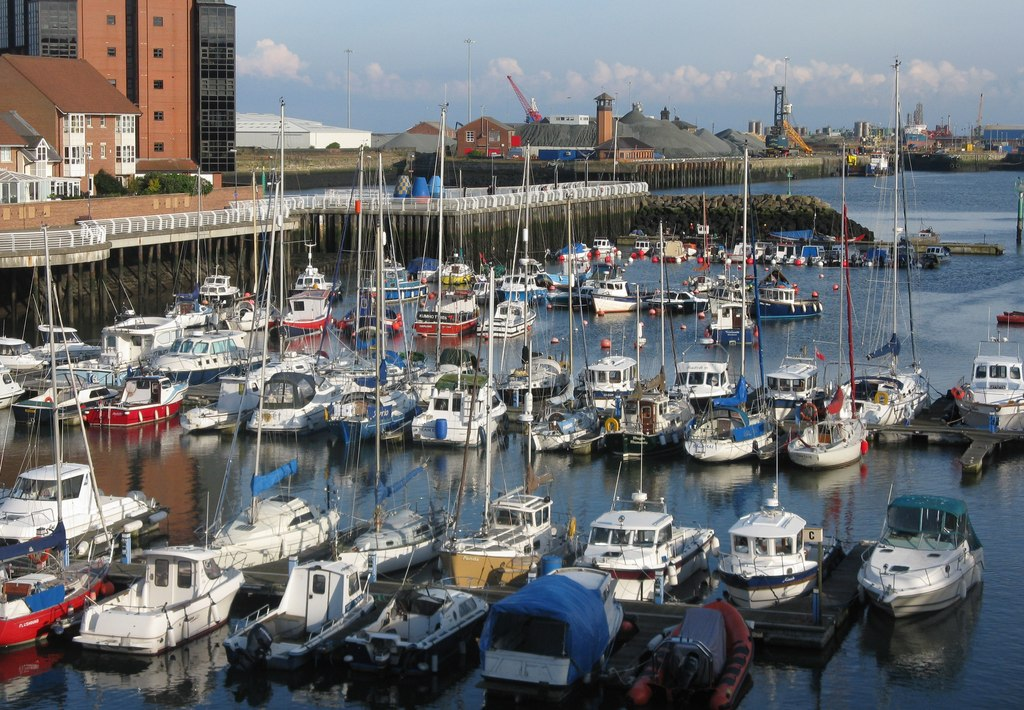
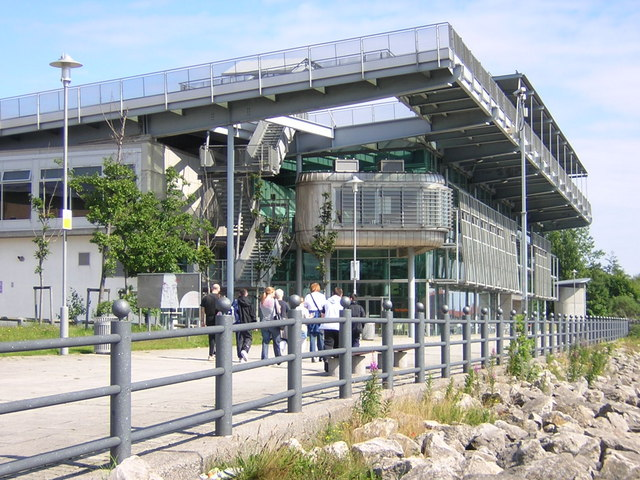
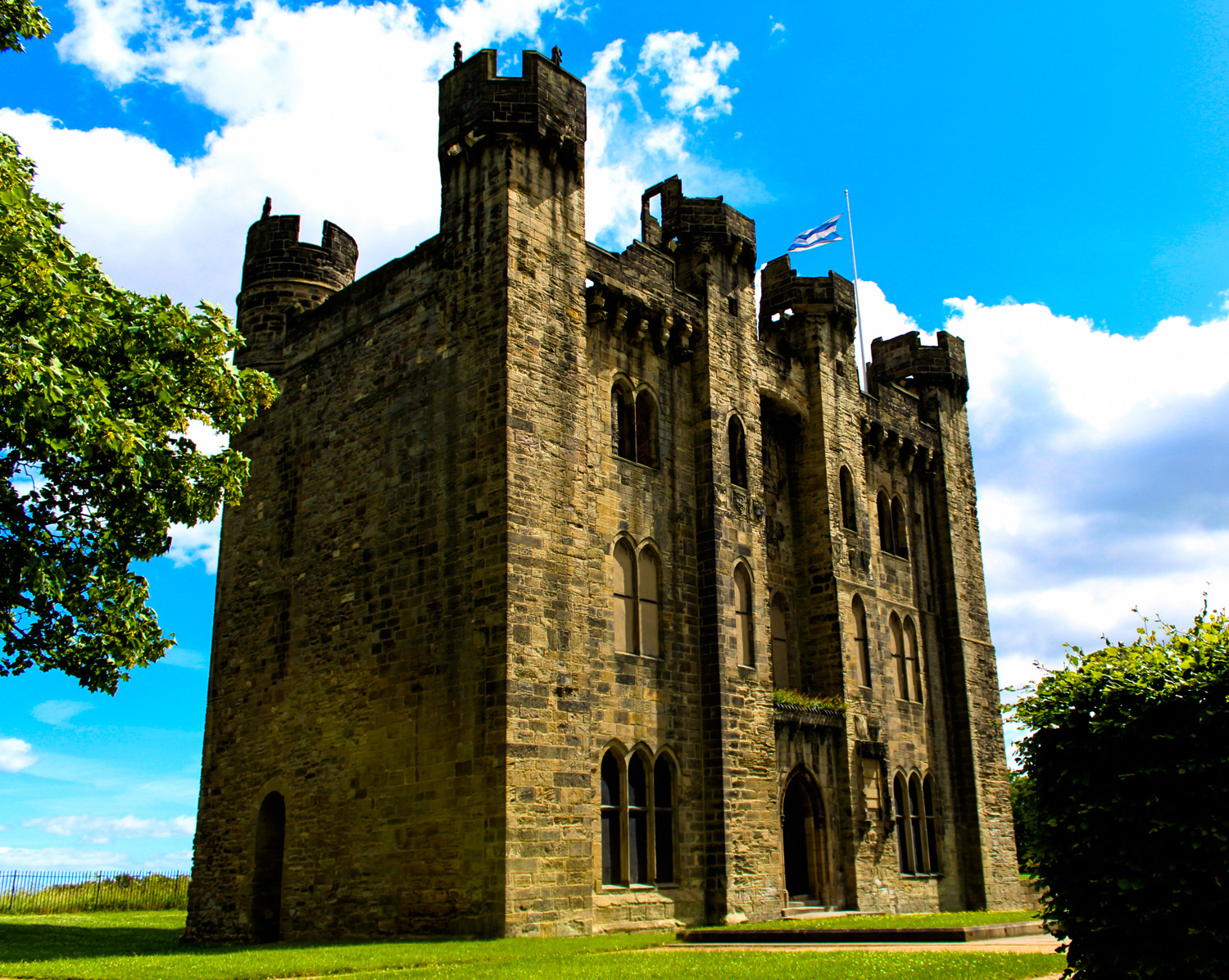
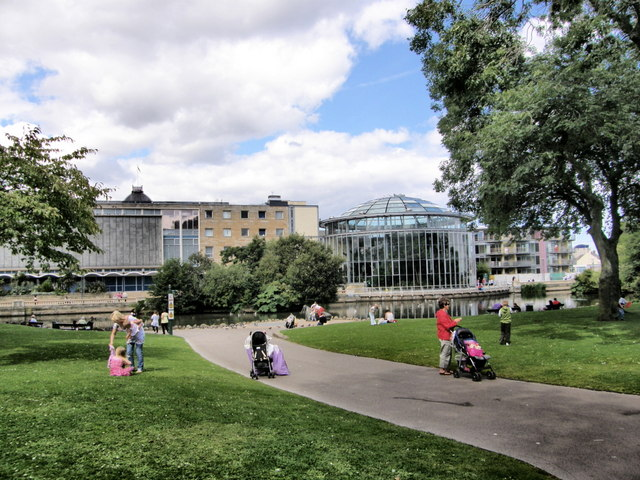
Clockwise from top: the marina; the National Glass Centre; the Museum and Winter Gardens from Mowbray Park; and Hylton Castle

Notable attractions for visitors to Sunderland include the 14th century Hylton Castle and the beaches of Roker and Seaburn. The National Glass Centre opened in 1998, reflecting Sunderland's distinguished history of glass-making.

Sunderland Museum and Winter Gardens, on Borough Road, was the first municipally funded museum in the country outside London. It houses a comprehensive collection of the locally produced Sunderland Lustreware pottery. The City Library Arts Centre, on Fawcett Street, housed the Northern Gallery for Contemporary Art until the library was closed in January 2017. The library service was relocated to the Museum and Winter Gardens and the Gallery for Contemporary Art transferred to Sunderland University.

Every year the city hosts a large Remembrance Day memorial service, the largest in the UK outside London in 2006.

Sunderland celebrates an annual Restaurant week, where city centre restaurants provide some of the best plates at low costs.

=== Literature and art ===
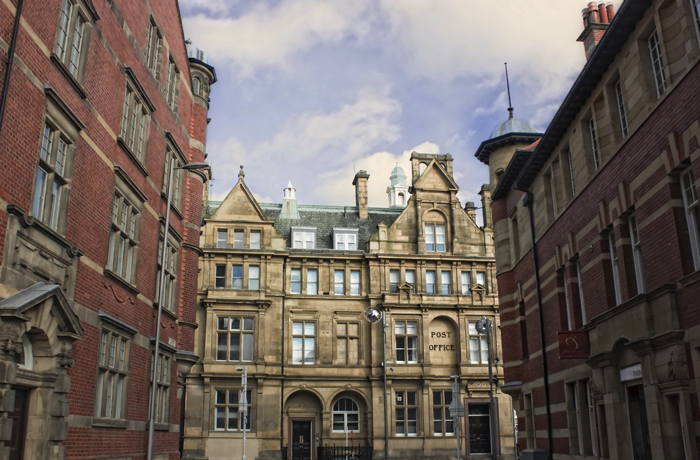
Sunniside district in the city centre

Lewis Carroll was a frequent visitor to the area. He wrote most of Jabberwocky at Whitburn as well as "The Walrus and the Carpenter". Some parts of the area are also widely believed to be the inspiration for his Alice in Wonderland stories, such as Hylton Castle and Backhouse Park. There is a statue to Carroll in Whitburn library. Lewis Carroll was also a visitor to the Rectory of Holy Trinity Church, Southwick; then a township independent of Sunderland. Carroll's connection with Sunderland, and the area's history, is documented in Bryan Talbot's 2007 graphic novel Alice in Sunderland. More recently, Sunderland-born Terry Deary, writer of the series of Horrible Histories books, has achieved fame and success, and many others such as thriller writer Sheila Quigley, are following his lead.

The Salford-born painter L. S. Lowry was a frequent visitor, staying in the Seaburn Hotel in Sunderland. Many of his paintings of seascapes and shipbuilding are based on Wearside scenes. The Northern Gallery for Contemporary Art on Fawcett Street and Sunderland Museum and Winter Gardens showcase exhibitions and installations from up-and-coming and established artists alike, with the latter holding an extensive collection of Lowry. The National Glass Centre on Liberty Way also exhibits a number of glass sculptures.

=== Media, film and television ===
Sunderland has a local newspaper: the daily tabloid The Sunderland Echo, founded in 1873.

It also has its own commercial station, Nation Radio North East, formerly known as Sun FM, an independent station but now owned by Nation Broadcasting who acquired the station from the UKRD Group, a student-led community radio station, Spark, and a hospital radio station – Radio Sunderland for Hospitals, and can receive other north-eastern independent radio stations Hits Radio North East, Greatest Hits Radio North East, Capital North East, Smooth North East and Heart North East. The regional BBC radio station is BBC Radio Newcastle. The city is covered by BBC North East and Cumbria and ITV's Tyne Tees franchise, which has a regional office in the university's media centre.

Sunderland's inaugural film festival took place in December 2003 at the Bonded Warehouse building on Sunderland riverside, in spite of the lack of any cinema facilities in the city at that time, featuring the films of local and aspiring directors as well as re-showings of acclaimed works, such as Alan Bleasdale's The Monocled Mutineer, accompanied by analysis. By the time of the second festival commencing on 21 January 2005, a new cinema multiplex had opened in Sunderland to provide a venue which allowed the festival to showcase over twenty films.

In March 2024, Crown Works Studios was given government backing to pave the way to create thousands of jobs across the north-east of England. The development forms part of a major regeneration scheme taking place in Wearside. Planning firm Lichfields said the studios would put the North East "on the map" as an international centre for broadcast and film production. Main financial backers for the Crown Works Studios include Fulwell Entertainment and the United Kingdom government. Cain initially invested in the project but withdrew from it in June 2025.

=== Music, dance and kites ===
In January 2025, Sunderland Music City announced that its bid to join the Music Cities Network has been successful, with Sunderland now a fully fledged member of the global collective. The accreditation will make Sunderland only the second city in the UK to join the network, behind Manchester. The Music Cities Network, established in 2016, connects cities worldwide to promote the music industry's growth, economic development, and cultural exchange. Sunderland's place among the roster of international Music Cities is an acknowledgement of Wearside's significant musical heritage and marks the ongoing commitment to nurturing the city's dynamic music scene and creative economy. Inclusion in the network gives members access to collaborative opportunities, resources, and advocacy that will help the city build on its music ecosystem and support cultural, social, and economic development.

In 2013, local band Frankie and The Heartstrings opened a temporary pop up record store in the city, Pop Recs Ltd. Initially only intended to remain open for a fortnight, the store remains open and has hosted live performances from acts including the Cribs, the Vaccines and the Charlatans.

The Sunderland Stadium of Light, home to Sunderland AFC, is recognised internationally as a major stadium concert venue. Headlining acts have included Oasis, Take That, Pink, Kings of Leon, Red Hot Chili Peppers, Coldplay, Bruce Springsteen and the E Street Band, Bon Jovi, Rihanna, One Direction, Foo Fighters and Beyoncé. The Empire Theatre and Firestation play host to music acts. Venues such as Independent, a city-centre nightclub/music venue, satisfy music lovers need eclectic tastes and need to hear the next generation of bands.

Since 2009, Sunderland: Live in the city has played host to a series of free and ticketed live music events throughout venues in the city centre.

In May 2005, Sunderland played host to BBC Radio 1's Big Weekend concert at Herrington Country Park, attended by 30,000 visitors and which featured Foo Fighters, Kasabian, KT Tunstall, Chemical Brothers and the Black Eyed Peas.

The Manor Quay' the students' union nightclub on St Peter's Riverside at the University of Sunderland, has hosted the Arctic Monkeys, Maxïmo Park, 911, the Levellers and Girls Aloud. In 2009, the club was taken into private ownership under the name Campus and hosted N-Dubz, Ocean Colour Scene, Little Boots, Gary Numan and Showaddywaddy but has since been returned to the university where it has become the Interfaith Chaplaincy Centre.

The former students' union Wearmouth Hall hosted Voice of the Beehive, Manic Street Preachers, The Primitives and Radiohead before closing in 1992.

Sunderland musicians that have gone on to reach international fame include Dave Stewart of the Eurythmics and all four members of Kenickie, whose vocalist Lauren Laverne later became known as a TV presenter. In recent years, the underground music scene in Sunderland has helped promote the likes of Frankie & the Heartstrings, the Futureheads, the Golden Virgins and Field Music. Other Mackem musicians include punk rockers the Toy Dolls ("Nellie the Elephant", December 1984); oi! punk band Red Alert; melodic hardcore punk band Leatherface; the lead singer of dance outfit Olive, Ruth Ann Boyle ("You're Not Alone", May 1997); and A Tribe of Toffs ("John Kettley is a Weatherman", December 1988).

Sunderland has also hosted a free International Festival of Kites, Music and Dance, which attracted kite-makers from around the world to Northumbria Playing Fields, Washington.

=== Theatres and performance venues ===
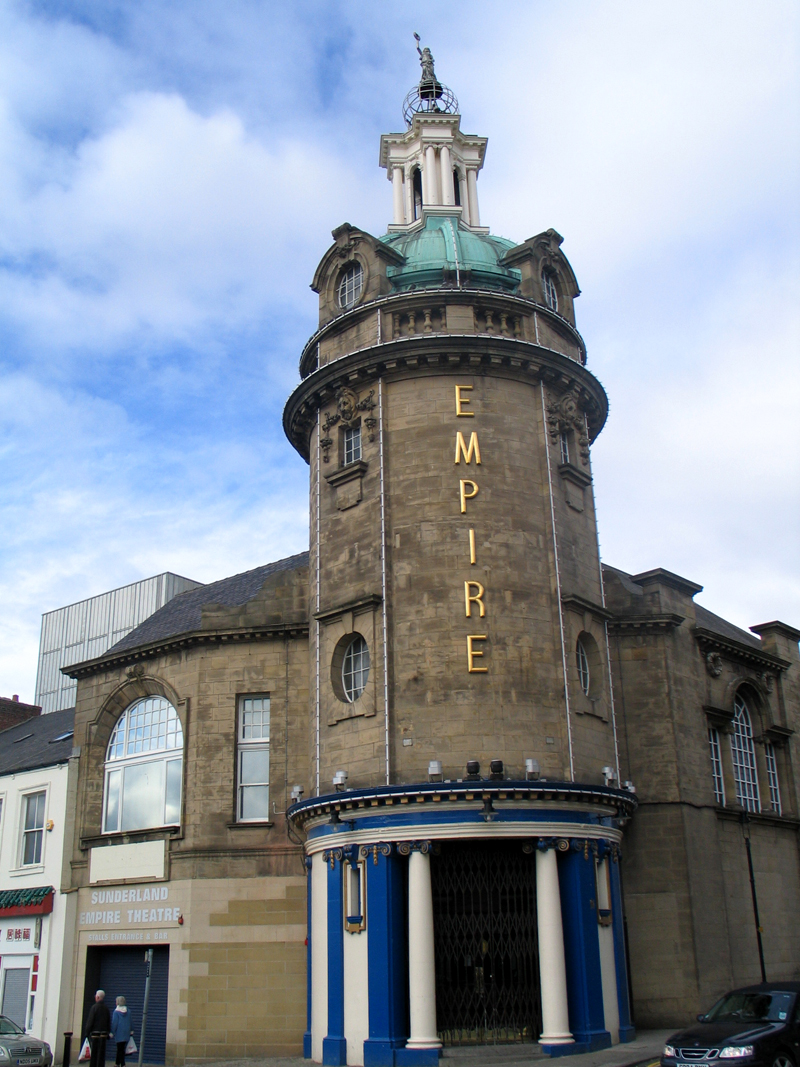
The Sunderland Empire

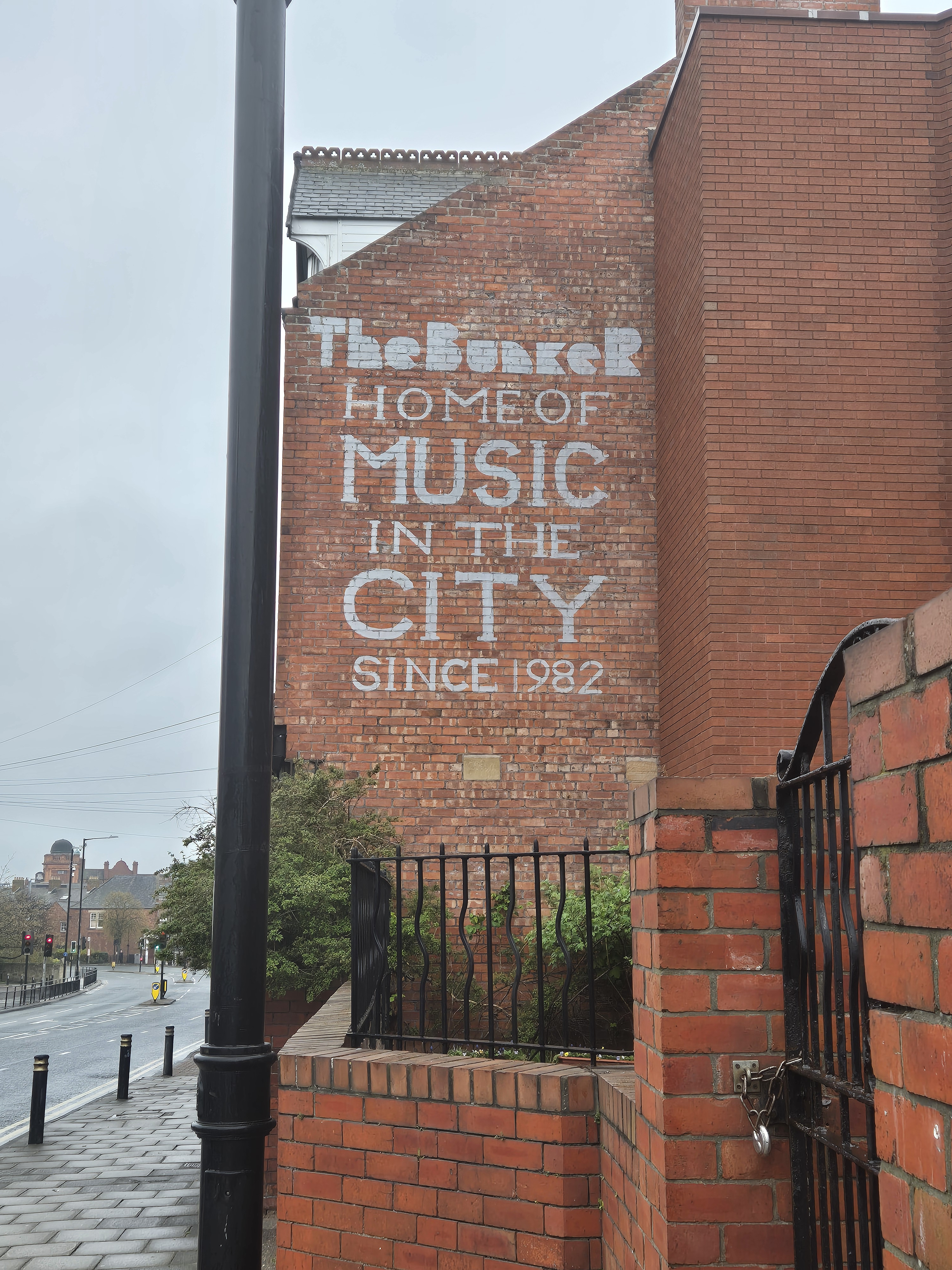
The Bunker, Sunderland

The Sunderland Empire Theatre opened in 1907 on High Street West in the city centre. It is the largest theatre in between Edinburgh and Manchester, and completed a comprehensive refurbishment in 2004. Operated by international entertainment group Live Nation, the Empire is the only theatre between Glasgow and Leeds with sufficient capacity to accommodate large West End productions. It is where British comic actor Sid James died of a heart attack whilst on stage in 1976.

The Bunker is the only venue in Sunderland where you can rehearse, record, learn and perform, all in one location. Born as a youth project in 1980, finally settling in its current home in 1983, new music talent can practice and perform in the same building that has hosted gigs by The Clash, Bjork, Chumbawamba and Billy Bragg. The Bunker has a history synonymous with the development of music making in the North East.

Independent is popular grass roots music venue in Sunderland, nurturing young talent, supporting bands and giving people a stage to play their first ever show. Open since the early 2000s, it has played host to not only a range of up-and coming talent, but acts such as The Zutons, Jamie T, Klaxons as well as local heroes such as The Futureheads and Field Music.

The Fire Station is a live music and performance auditorium that complements its Edwardian neighbour, the Empire Theatre. It is operated by Sunderland Culture. In 2017, the Sunderland MAC Trust restored Sunderland's 1908 Central Fire Station, vacant since 1992, and converted it into a cultural hub with dance and literacy studios, teaching rooms and a bar/restaurant. The Fire Station auditorium is a 500 seat/800 standing venue attached to the restored building which opened in December 2021.

The Royalty Theatre on Chester Road is the home to the amateur Royalty Theatre Group who also put on a number of low-budget productions throughout the year. Film producer David Parfitt belonged to this company and is now a patron of the theatre.

The Sunniside area plays host to a number of smaller theatrical workshops and production houses.

=== Landmarks ===
Landmarks in Sunderland include the Wearmouth Bridge, Monkwearmouth Railway Bridge, Northern Spire Bridge, Keel Crossing, Queen Alexandra Bridge, Penshaw Monument, Sunderland Minster, and the Tunstall Hills.

== Sport ==
=== Football ===
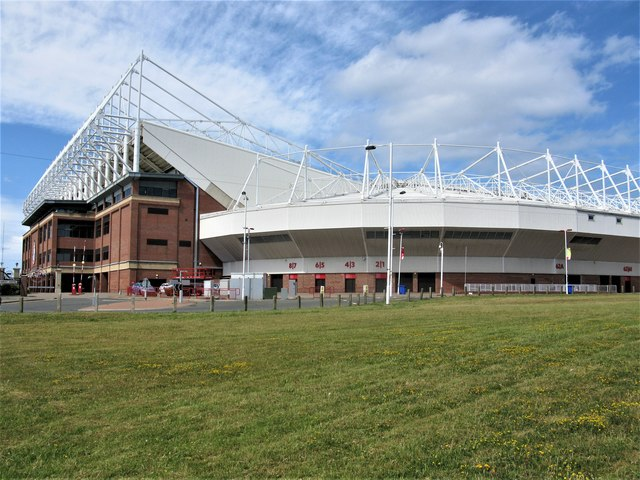
View of the Stadium of Light

The city is well known for its passion for football.

The football team, Sunderland A.F.C. was elected to the Football League in 1890. Sunderland supporters are one of the oldest fan bases in England: in 2019 it was reported that despite being in League One, Sunderland's average gates were higher than those of such teams as Lyon, Napoli, Roma, Valencia, Juventus, and Porto. After relegations from the FA Premier League and the EFL Championship, documented in the streaming series Sunderland 'Til I Die the club played four consecutive seasons in EFL League One. It played in the EFL Championship since the 2022–23 season until the 2024–2025 season, in which it was promoted back to the Premier League through the play-offs for the first time in eight years. It is based at the 49,000-seat Stadium of Light, which was opened in 1997.

Sunderland AFC's longest stadium occupancy so far was of Roker Park for 99 years beginning in 1898, with relocation taking place due to the stadium's confined location and the need to build an all-seater stadium.

Sunderland A.F.C. Women is one of the north-east's top women's football teams. They currently play in the 2nd tier of English women's football, the Women's Super League 2.

The city also has three non-league sides, Sunderland Ryhope Community Association F.C., and Ryhope Colliery Welfare F.C., both of the Northern League Division One as well as Sunderland West End FC of the Wearside League, who play at the Ford Quarry Complex.

=== Rugby and Cricket ===
The Ashbrooke ground was opened on 30 May 1887. Sunderland's amateur Rugby and Cricket clubs are both based in Ashbrooke.

=== Boxing & MMA ===
Sunderland boasts a large combat sports community with active clubs such as Sunderland Amateur Boxing Club, Lambton Street ABC and Roker Rough House.

Kiaran MacDonald picked up a silver at both the 2022 European Championships and Commonwealth Games. Other talented boxers from Sunderland include former Olympians Tony Jeffries, Josh Kelly, and Billy Hardy, and Layla Straughan. Notable Mixed Martial Artists who have competed out of Sunderland are Andy Ogle, Ian Freeman, Phil De Fries, Mick Parkin, Alex Enlund and Ross Pearson.

=== Swimming ===
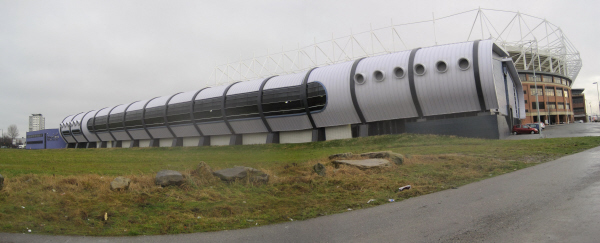
Sunderland Aquatic Centre, located next to the Stadium of Light, holds the only Olympic-sized swimming pool in North-East England.

On 18 April 2008, the Sunderland Aquatic Centre was opened. Constructed at a cost of £20 million, it is the only Olympic sized 50 m pool between Leeds and Edinburgh and has six diving boards, which stand at 1 m, 3 m and 5 m.

The Crowtree Leisure Centre has also played host to a number of important boxing matches and snooker championships including the 2003 Snooker World Trickshot and Premier League Final. In September 2005, BBC TV cameras captured international boxing bouts featuring local boxers David Dolan, Stuart Kennedy and Tony Jeffries. The latter became Sunderland's first Olympic medallist when he won a bronze medal in the light heavyweight boxing category for Great Britain and Northern Ireland at the 2008 Beijing Olympic Games.

=== Athletics ===
In 2023, the British leg of the 2023 World Triathlon Championship Series was hosted in Sunderland, bringing elite swim, bike, run to Sunderland. The beach front at Roker welcomed the triathletes from around the world as well as thousands of amateur participants over the weekend of 29–30 July 2023 for a festival of swim, bike, and run.

Sunderland Harriers Athletics Club based at Silksworth Sports Complex. 800 m runner Gavin Massingham represented the club at the AAA Championships in 2005.

The first Sunderland city 10 km was held in 2011, with just over 1500 taking part. By 2021, the Sunderland City Runs welcomed 4000 participants to the city streets in a celebration of running across a range of distances. Entrants can choose the flat and fast 10K, a spring Half-Marathon, or the Active Sunderland Big 3K.

On 25 June 2006, the first Great Women's Run took place along Sunderland's coastline. Among the field which lined up to start the race were Olympic silver medallists Sonia O'Sullivan of the Republic of Ireland and Gete Wami of Ethiopia, who eventually won the race. The race quickly became an annual fixture in the city's sporting schedule, with races in 2007 and 2008. In 2009, the race was relaunched as the Great North 10K Run, allowing male competitors to take part for the first time, on 12 July.

== Twin towns and sister cities ==
Sunderland is twinned with:

- Essen, Germany
- Harbin, China
- Saint-Nazaire, France
- Washington, D.C., United States

Sunderland is the only non-capital city that is twinned with Washington, D.C., as it includes the town of Washington, the ancestral home of George Washington's family.

== See also ==
- Sunderland's Boxing Day dip
- The North Dock Tufa
- List of important dates in the history of Sunderland
- The New Monkey
- Future developments in City of Sunderland
