= Future developments in City of Sunderland =

Proposed development projects

There have been number of proposed developments in City of Sunderland in England aimed at supporting its revitalisation. Although the majority of the schemes have not progressed past initial consultation phase.

== The Holmeside Triangle ==
The Holmeside Triangle is an area adjacent to the Park Lane transport interchange, enclosed on three sides by Park Lane, Holmeside and railway tracks. Sunderland arc own 75% of the land, currently occupied by a mixture of retail and commercial units including Park Lane Market. £147 million plans for the site include the creation of extensive retail space, public meeting spaces, cafes, bars and restaurants, and a 33-storey Skyscraper called the Spirit of Sunderland, which would be the tallest building in North East England. In the summer of 2009 it was announced that Thornfield properties had signed a £180 million agreement with Sunderland Arc, to fund and establish the development. However, despite having the benefit of an exclusivity deal signed with the Council Thornfield Ventures, the preferred developer, have become another victim of the recession and gone into administration The project had since been dropped.

== Grove and Transport Corridor ==
The Sunderland Strategic Transport Corridor (SSTC) is a proposed transport link from the A19, through the city centre, to the port. A major phase of the plan is the creation of a new bridge, which will link the A1231 Wessington Way on the north of the river with the Grove site in Pallion, on the south of the river. In 2008, Sunderland City Council offered the residents of Sunderland the opportunity to vote on the design of the bridge. The choices were a 700-foot-tall (210 m), iconic cable stay bridge, which would result in a temporary increase in council tax, or a simple road bridge which would be within the council's budget. The results of the consultation were inconclusive, with residents keen to have an iconic bridge, but reluctant to have a subsequent increase in tax to fund it. Regardless of the ultimate design of the new bridge, the landing point will be the Grove site in Pallion. Plans for this site focus around the creation of a new residential area, with homes, community buildings, commercial and retail sites.

In September 2009, City Councillors agreed to proceed with the landmark bridge, which can be delivered without any increased costs to taxpayers. The bridge will be the tallest bridge in England. A planning application for the bridge is now being developed and could be submitted by the end of 2009. Subject to further permissions on planning and funding, work could begin in 2012 with completion towards the end of 2014. The planning application was in fact submitted in December 2009.

On May 14, 2010. The Sunderland City Council approved an application for River Wear Bridge. It will be a cable-stay bridge, towering 180 meters above the River Wear and connecting Castletown and Pallion. The bridge will be having two independent curving steel masts with the taller western mast rising to 190 meters, making the structure UK's tallest bridge.. The suspended deck will cover 336 meters and will consist of two carriageways, along with pedestrian and cycle access. The deck will be hung some 16 to 20 meters above the River Wear. The construction is planned to begin in 2012 with completion slated in 2015.

On 10 July 2013, Sunderland Council announced the project would be abandoned. The excessive costs and changing economic climate were cited as reasons, and a cheaper, less complex bridge would instead be commissioned.
