= Mac Brádaigh =

Mac Brádaigh is an Irish surname, meaning "spirited".

== Overview ==
The MacBrádaigh family were a strong sept of Breifne, in what is now County Cavan. Chiefs of Cúil Bhríghde feature in the Annals of Ireland, for example in the 'Annals of the Four Masters'. The surname is still strongly represented in that county, and in adjacent areas in County Meath. In 1890 in County Cavan, Brady had the third highest number of births registered. The surname is generally anglicised as Brady.

A separate family, the Ó Grádaigh, of north-east Thomond, generally anglicise their name as O'Grady, but some have also used the name Brady.

== Genealogy ==
- Tighearnán mac Gallbrath mac Domhnall mac Bradaigh (a quo Mac Brádaigh) mac Niall mac Geistal mac Cerbhuill mac Maolmordha (a quo Muintir Maoilmhordha) mac Cearnachán mac Donnchadh mac Baoithín mac Blathmac mac Feidhlimidh mac Criomhthan mac Scannlán mac Aodh Fionn mac Fearghna mac Fearghus mac Muireadhach Mál mac Eóghan Sréb mac Duí Galach mac Brion (a quo Uí Briúin') mac Eochaid Mugmedon.

== Notables ==
- Tighearán Mac Brádaigh, Chief of the Name, died 1256.
- Gilbert Mac Brádaigh, Bishop of Ardagh, 1396–1400.
- Nicol Mac Brádaigh, Bishop of Kilmore, died 1421.
- Aindrias Mac Brádaigh, bishop of Kilmore, died 1445.
- Tomás Mac Brádaigh, bishop of Kilmore, died 1511.
- Sean Mac Brádaigh, bishop of Kilmore, died 1559.
- Aodh Mac Brádaigh/Hugh Brady, Church of Ireland Bishop of Meath, died 1584. (from the O'Grady family)
- Richard Mac Brádaigh (Richard Brady), bishop of Kilmore, died 1607.
- Fedlim Mac Brádaigh, the bard of Armagh, fl. 1710.
- Phillip Mac Brádaigh, Protestant cleric and Gaelic poet, died 1719.
- Michael Mac Brádaigh, Jacobite, executed 1746.
- Fiachra Mac Brádaigh, Irish poet and scribe, c. 1690-c.1760.
- Thomas Mac Brádaigh, Field marshal of Austria, 1752–1827
- Thomas A. Mac Brádaigh, USMC, Battle of Chapultepec, 1813–47.
- Seán Mac Brádaigh, historian and genealogist, born 1932.
