= Alumni Dublinenses =

Trinity College Dublin biographical dictionary

- Flag of Trinity College Dublin
- Country: United Kingdom / Ireland
- Language: English
- Publisher: Williams and Norgate, London; Alexander Thom & Co., Dublin
- Published: 1924, 1935
- No. of books: 3 (first edition); 3 and Supplement (second edition)

Alumni Dublinenses: a register of the students, graduates, professors and provosts of Trinity College, Dublin, 1593–1860 is a biographical reference work by George Dames Burtchaell (1853–1921) and Thomas Sadleir (1882–1957), first published in 1924 in three volumes by Williams and Norgate, listing the alumni of the college, the only one of the University of Dublin, and covering the years 1593 to 1846. This period was extended to 1860 in a later edition.

== Outline ==
The work contains over 35,000 Irish and non-Irish biographies, arranged alphabetically by surname. Wherever possible, for each entry it gives the man's full name, place of birth, schoolmaster or school, date of entry to the college, age, father's name and status, and any degrees awarded, and it cross-references dozens of other reference works. It is often the only source of information available on Dublin-educated clergymen, lawyers, politicians, scientists, civil servants, and others.

The volumes were compiled from the matriculation registers of Trinity College Dublin, which for most of the period was the only seat of advanced learning in Ireland, from the university archives, and from many other printed sources. As expanded in 1935, they seek to give biographies of all students and senior academic staff who were members of Trinity College from its earliest days up to 1860.

The work was ongoing for many years, at the same time as John Venn was working on Part I of Alumni Cantabrigienses ("From the earliest times to 1751"), which was published in four volumes at Cambridge between 1922 and 1927. At Oxford, Joseph Foster had already in 1892 completed the four volumes of Alumni Oxonienses, covering the years 1500 to 1886, but not the Middle Ages. This was followed in 1893 by his Oxford Men and their Colleges (1880–1892), in two volumes. At Cambridge, Venn's son John Archibald Venn continued his father's work in Part II (1752–1900), a further six volumes which appeared between 1940 and 1954.

== Editions ==
The first edition was reported to be "in the press" in October 1921, shortly after the death of Burtchaell, but was not published until 10 June 1924, when the set of three volumes was priced at 42 shillings, or two Guineas.

A new edition was published by Alexander Thom & Co. of Dublin in 1935. This has a supplement, addenda, and corrigenda, and takes the years covered up to 1860. The later edition was reprinted in England in 2001.

- Alumni Dublinenses: a register of the students, graduates, professors and provosts of Trinity College, in the University of Dublin, 1593–1846, edited by George Dames Burtchaell K. C., M. A., and Thomas Ulick Sadleir M. A. (London: Williams and Norgate, three volumes, 1924)
- Alumni Dublinenses: a register of the students, graduates, professors and provosts of Trinity College, Dublin, 1593–1860, new edition in three volumes with supplement (Dublin: A. Thom & Co., 1935)
- The 1935 edition was reprinted in three volumes by Thoemmes Press, of Bristol, in 2001 ISBN 9781855069534

== Full texts online ==
- Alumni Dublinenses, Digital Collections of Trinity College Dublin
- Volume 2 (Gabbett —Ryves) of the 2001 reprint at Archive.org

== See also ==
- Alumni Cantabrigienses
- Alumni Oxonienses
