= James Terry =

James Terry may refer to:

- James Terry (officer of arms), Irish officer of arms
- James Terry (fighter), American mixed martial artist
- James L. Terry, United States Army general
- James Terry (basketball), American-Israeli basketball player
