= Séamus P. Ó Mórdha =

Irish historian (1915–2005)

- Born: 8 October 1915; Scotshouse, County Monaghan
- Died: 12 February 2005 (aged 89)

Academic work
- Discipline: History
- Institutions: St. Patrick's College, Drumcondra, Dublin

Séamus P. Ó Mórdha (8 October 1915 – 12 February 2005) was an Irish teacher and historian.

A native of Scotshouse in County Monaghan, and professor of Irish at St. Patrick's College in Drumcondra, Dublin, from 1954 to 1981, Ó Mórdha contributed to Celtica, Éigse, Studies, Studia Hibernica, Seanchas Ardmhacha, and Breifne. His published work included studies of poets such as Fiachra Mac Brádaigh, Art Mac Bionaid, and Muiris Ó Gormáin. The Irish Times praised him as a "renowned scholar who promoted Irish education, language and culture. ... His tenure coincided with a period of great change in education that saw the introduction of the new curriculum and the restructuring of teacher training. When St Patrick’s College was granted university status in 1974 he ensured that the Irish department rose to the challenge by offering courses on a par with any third-level institute."
