= Oxoniensis =

Oxoniensis is a Latin adjective derived from Oxonia, the Latin name of Oxford, meaning "relating to Oxford, Oxonian“ and may refer to:

- Universitas Oxoniensis, see University of Oxford
- Editio Oxoniensis, a critical edition of a Greek or Latin text in the Oxford Classical Texts series
- Alumni Oxonienses, a biographical directory of University of Oxford alumni
