= James Terry (officer of arms) =

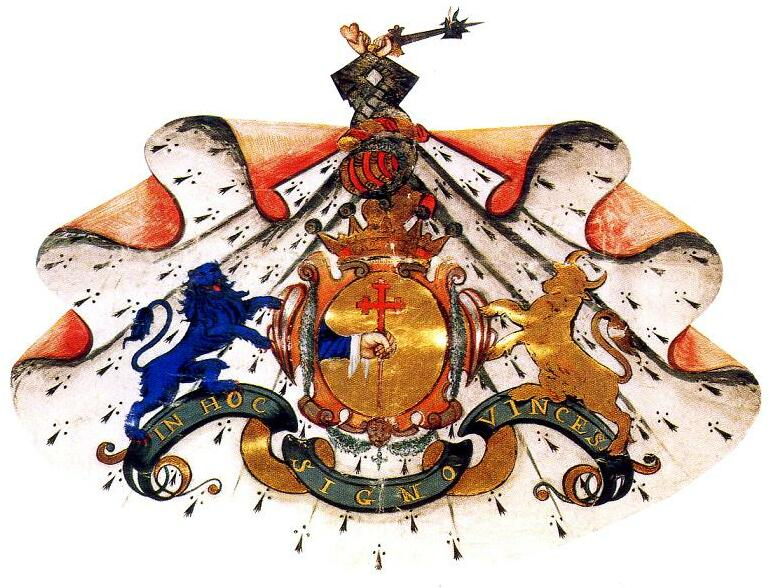
The arms of Sir Rory O'Donnell, 1st Earl of Tyrconnell (1603), exemplified in a genealogy provided to Daniel O'Donnell by James Terry in 1709

James Terry (Limerick, Ireland, 26 May 1660 - Paris, France 1725) was an Irish officer of arms who remained faithful to the Jacobite kings of Britain after their escape to the European continent.

== Biography ==
Terry was born in Limerick, 1660, to John Terry, from Cork, and wife Mary Ronan. After the defeat of James II of England, the court went into exile in St Germain, France. James Terry had been serving as Athlone Pursuivant of Arms in Ordinary at the Irish Office of Arms, and took his seal of office and his heraldic records with him to France. As James II still considered himself King of England, Scotland, and Ireland, he needed a herald with him to handle matters of heraldry and ceremonial. In 1690, he appointed Terry to the post of Athlone Herald.

It is interesting to consider that during the exile, Terry was in communication with English and Scottish heralds when it became necessary to verify armorial records and genealogies. In spite of the dispute between the royals that employed them, the heralds still maintained a collegial working relationship. Terry continued granting arms to the members of the Irish diaspora until his death in 1725. After his death, the Irish abroad were obliged to apply to Ulster King of Arms for grants.

A collection of his pedigrees and papers has been published in bookform.

== Family ==
In 1678, Terry married Mary Stritch of Limerich, and had several children:

- John, naturalised Spanish as Juan Bautista Tirry y Stritch. Married to his first cousin Francisca Patricia Tirry y Sánchez-Silveira, 2nd Marchioness of la Cañada (her father, Guillermo Terry, 1st Marquess of la Cañada, being James' younger brother).
- William
- Margaret

== Sources ==
- Micheál Ó Comáin. The Poolbeg Book of Irish Heraldry. Poolbeg: Dublin, 1991, 51-3.
- Stephen Slater. The Complete Book of Heraldry. Hermes House: New York, 1999, 192-195.
- Seán MacBrádaigh. James Terry's Legacy, pp. 22–25, Journal of the Genealogical Society of Ireland, vol. 5, # 1, Spring 2004.
- Charles Edmund Lart. The pedigrees and papers of James Terry, Athlone Herald, at the Court of James II in France (1690 - 1725). William Pollard & Co., Exeter, 1938.
