= William Darrell =

William Darrell may refer to:

- William Darrell of Littlecote (1539–1589), MP for Downton
- William Darrell (Jesuit) (1651–1721), English Jesuit theologian and writer
- William Darell (clergyman), also spelled Darrell, (d. after 1580), English Anglican clergyman and antiquarian

== See also ==
- William Darell (disambiguation)
