= William Darell =

William Darell may refer to:

- William Darell (clergyman) (d. after 1580), English Anglican clergyman and antiquarian
- William Darell (British Army officer) (1878–1954), British Army officer

== See also ==
- William Darrell (disambiguation)
