= William Darell (clergyman) =

English Anglican clergyman and antiquarian

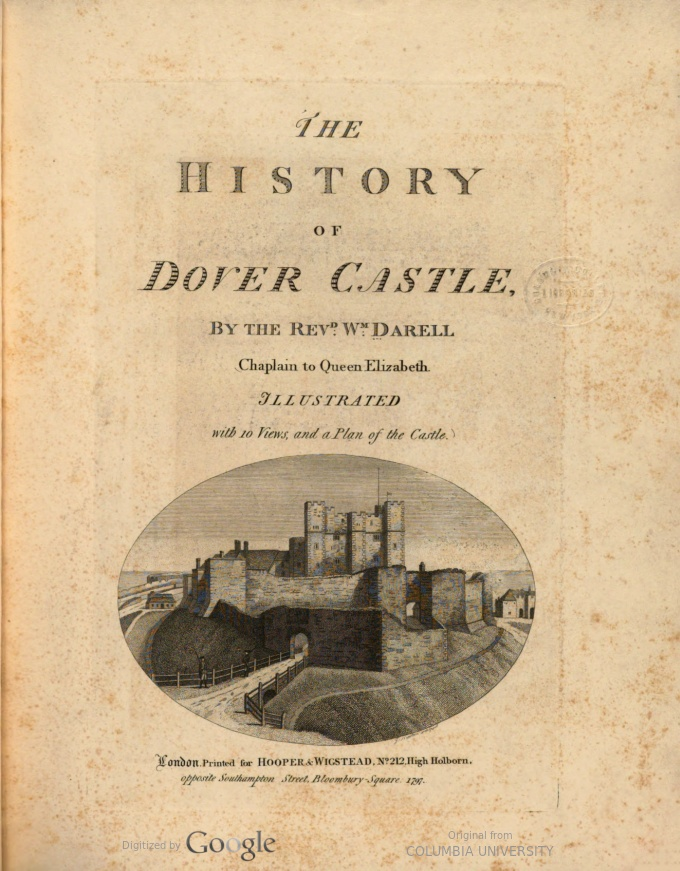
The History of Dover Castle (1797), the only published fruit of Darell's antiquarian work on the castles of Kent, with the relevant sections on Dover Castle translated from Latin.

William Darell or Darrell (died after 16 February 1580) was an English Anglican clergyman and antiquarian.

Born in Kent, Darell first appears in the historical record when in 1546 he was presented to the rectory in his home town of Little Chart. A pluralist, Darell went on to hold many benefices, rectories, and vicarages during his ecclesiastical career. This included notably a prebend at Canterbury Cathedral, where he was among those who elected Matthew Parker to the Archbishopric of Canterbury and subsequently worked under Parker as an antiquarian. However a succession of controversies within the church—including one where he was found smuggling a woman of "suspect behaviour" into his Canterbury quarters—precipitated a loss of favour in the 1570s. After he lost his prebend at Canterbury in 1580, Darrel disappeared from the historical record.

== Biography ==
Darell was born into the ancient Darell family of Calehill, Little Chart, Kent who remained loyal to the Catholic Church after the English Reformation; nothing more is known of his early life. He first appears in the historical record when he is presented to the rectory of Little Chart in 1546. By 1548, he had the benefice of St Andrew's, Droitwich, Worcestershire; thereafter he found himself in the rectories of Milton-next-Gravesend, Kent in 1549 and Chawton, Hampshire in 1553. When Elizabeth came to the throne in 1558, Darell was living in Lenham, Kent.

On both 23 September 1553 and 24 March 1554, Darell was assigned to take over the third prebend of Canterbury Cathedral, Kent from the previous incumbent Robert Goldeston. Darell also attended Oxford University, where he graduated BA on 24 April 1554 and MA on 29 May 1554. At Canterbury, Darell was among five-person chapter who elected Matthew Parker to the Archbishopric of Canterbury. He was tasked with announcing the chapter's decision and presenting it to Parker for his approval. Darell thereafter advanced through the ranks of the Cathedral, becoming subdean in 1560. Under Archbishop Parker, Darell was among those encouraged in antiquarianism. He authored a work on the castles of Kent, entitled Castra in campo Cantiano ab antiquo aedita nobilium ope et diligentia, dedicated to his patron, William Brooke, 10th Baron Cobham, lord of the Manor of Cobham, Kent and Lord Warden of the Cinque Ports. Darell was also a diligent collector of manuscripts. Among his collection was a copy of the Flores Historiarum, a Latin chronicle of English history, with 14th-century additions, formerly in the collection of John Bale; a 15th-century copy of the medieval Brut Chronicle; and a 15th-century collection on the heraldry of the Irish nobility.

Darell also received preferment elsewhere while at Canterbury. He seems to have received an MA in 1564, after a residency at Corpus Christi College, Cambridge, perhaps thanks to his connection with Archbishop Parker. However no such MA degree has been found in Cambridge records. He served as the chancellor of Bangor from 1565 to 1570 and was, for a short time in 1568, the prebend of Flixton. He meanwhile received the rectories of Upper Hardres, Kent (1559), of Lower Hardres (1561), and of Kingweston, Somerset, (1564), as well as the vicarages of Monkton, Kent (1562) and of Benenden, Kent (1563). Darell gained favour at court, and was one of Elizabeth's chaplains by 1564. In 1569, Elizabeth made him a commissioner for Berkshire.

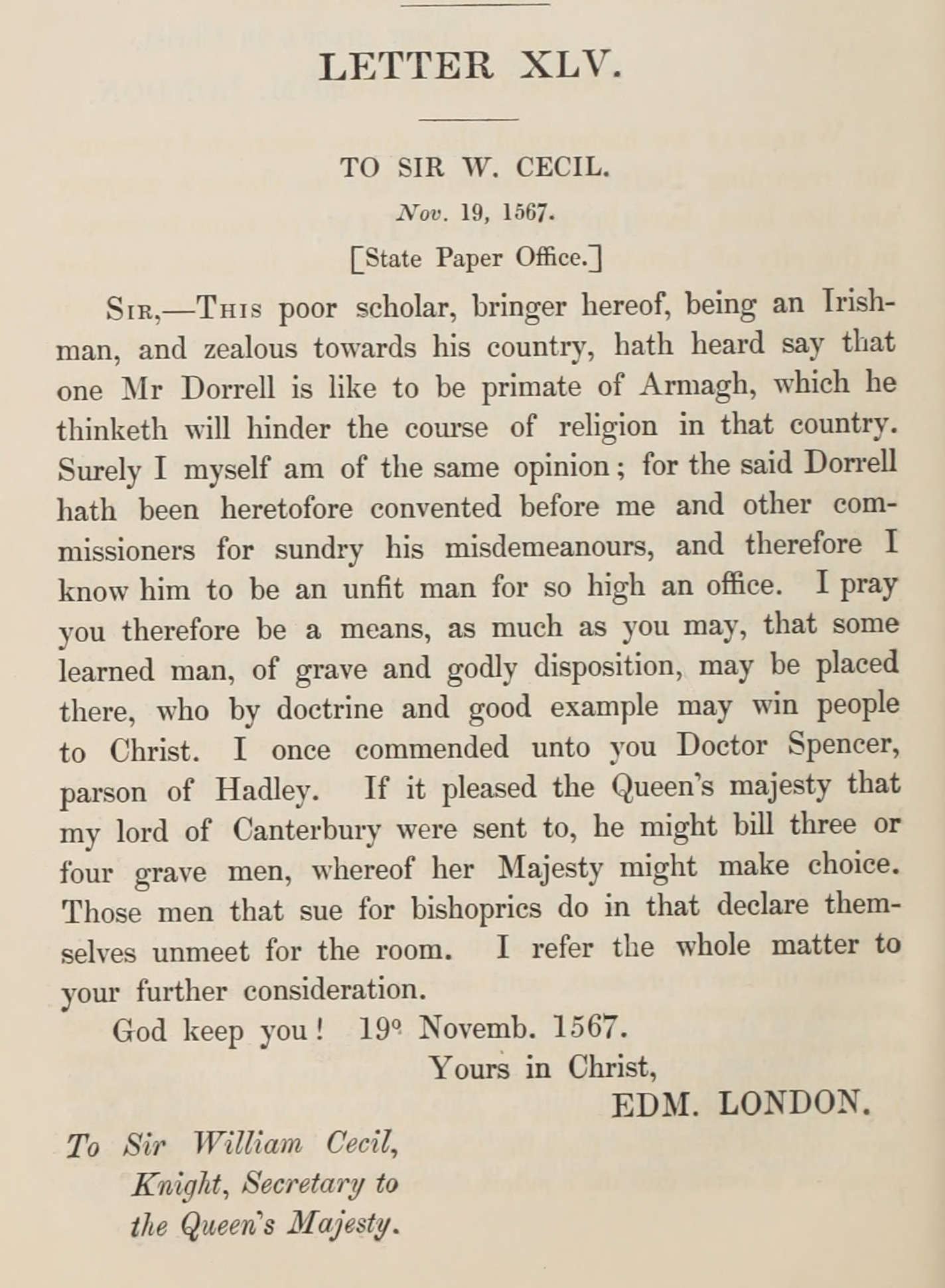
Grindal's letter of protest to William Cecil, dated 19 November 1567

In 1567, while obtaining an attorney (one Henry Style of Westminster) in the event he left England, Darell described himself as "Deane of Fernes in Irelande". This suggests that Darell is the same "Mr. Dorrell" who was proposed to be Archbishop of Armagh. The see went vacant in 1567, after previous incumbent Adam Loftus was elevated to Archbishop of Dublin. Among those subsequently proposed to the see was Darell. This nomination came to the attention of Edmund Grindal, Bishop of London, who apparently already regarded Darell as (in biographer John Strype's description) "corrupt in religion; though otherwise outwardly complying." Grindal assiduously opposed this nomination. On 19 November, he wrote to Secretary of State William Cecil to recommend against Darell; he spoke of one "poor scholar" in Ireland who had described to him how he dreaded Darell's election, believing his nomination would ultimately "hinder the course of religion in that country." Grindal moreover spoke of his own negative experiences with Darell: "the said Dorrell hath been heretofore convented before me and other commissioners for sundry his misdemeanours, and therefore I know him to be an unfit man for so high an office". He recommended one "Dr. Spenser, Parson of Hadley", but also offered to send forth several candidates, from whom the Queen could choose. Ultimately, Thomas Lancaster, previously Bishop of Kildare, was elected to the Archbishopric, most likely on the advice of Sir Henry Sidney, Elizabeth's Lord Deputy in Ireland. Cecil was apparently pleased with this nomination.

This was not the end of Darell's controversies within the church. Darell developed such extensive debts that he could no longer afford to pay them back, even with his many benefices, so the Cathedral chapter was forced to bail him out. Part of his prebend wages were seized as restitution. Rumours abounded about Darell's sexual misconduct at the chapel, culminating in a case brought before the ecclesiastical courts. Clemence Ward, a lady of "suspect behaviour" living in a nearby parish, had been seen entering a laundry basket destined for Darell's residence in Canterbury. One of the Cathedral lay clerks set upon the basket with a knife, stabbing Ward in the arm in the process, and thus substantiating the plot. Though nothing more is known of the case, as historian Andrew Butcher put it, "few stories [...] could be better designed to destroy Darrell's reputation". The Privy Council wrote to the ecclesiastical commissioners in the diocese of Canterbury concerning "certain horrible offences" committed by Darell, requesting he be cited before them. These offences went unmentioned in the letter, and nothing more is recorded of the Privy Council's request. However, Darell did subsequently lose some of his ecclesiastical positions: the rectory of Monkton, Kent in 1579 and the Canterbury prebend by 16 February 1580. His misconduct also apparently lost him favour at court, as he received no further preferment from Elizabeth.

Nothing more of Darell's life is known, including his date of death.

== Legacy ==
Darell's Castra in campo was never fully published; relevant selections were translated for Alexander Campbell's The History of Dover Castle (1786, 1797). But, as biographer Peter Sherlock put it, Darell was "perhaps of more significance as a collector". His copy of the Flores is now held at Lambeth Palace Library (MS 1106); his Brut, the British Library (Stowe MS 69); and his heraldic collection, the College of Arms (MS B 22).

== Sources ==
- Butcher, Andrew (1988). Introduction. Christopher Marlowe and Canterbury. By Urry, William. London: Faber and Faber. pp. ix–xl. ISBN 978-0-571-14566-9.
- Foster, Joseph, ed. (1891). "Darrell, William". Alumni Oxonienses, 1500-1714. Vol. 1. Oxford. OCLC 82239515.
- Jefferies, Henry A. (21 May 2009). "Lancaster, Thomas (d. 1583), Church of Ireland archbishop of Armagh". Oxford Dictionary of National Biography (online ed.). Oxford University Press. doi:10.1093/ref:odnb/15965. (Subscription or UK public library membership required.)
- Sherlock, Peter (23 September 2004). "Darell, William (d. in or after 1580), Church of England clergyman and antiquary". Oxford Dictionary of National Biography (online ed.). Oxford University Press. doi:10.1093/ref:odnb/7149. (Subscription or UK public library membership required.)
- Strype, John (1821). The History of the Life and Acts of the Most Reverend Father in God, Edmund Grindal, the first Bishop of London, and the second Archbishop of York and Canterbury Successively, in the Reign of Queen Elizabeth. Oxford: Clarendon Press. OCLC 633194849.
- Venn, John (1922). "Darell, William". Alumni Cantabrigienses. Vol. 2. Cambridge: Cambridge University Press. p. 13.
