= Chartershaugh Bridge =

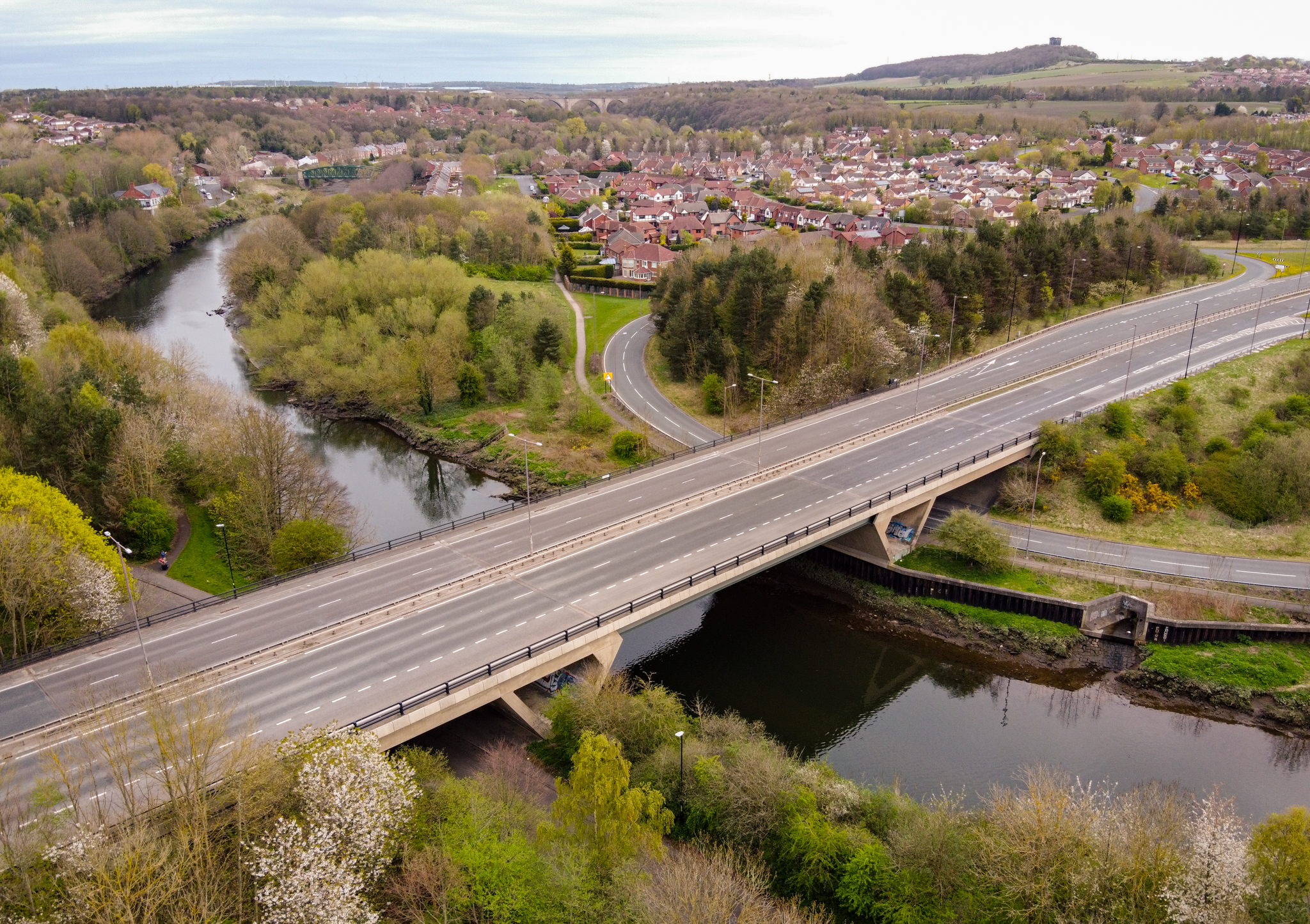
- Chartershaugh Bridge, 2020.
- Coordinates: 54.8760°N 1.5195°W
- OS grid reference: NZ309536
- Carries: A182 Washington Highway; Motor vehicles
- Crosses: River Wear
- Locale: Sunderland, England

History
- Opened: 1975

Location
- Interactive map of Chartershaugh Bridge

Chartershaugh Bridge is a road traffic bridge spanning the River Wear in North East England, linking Penshaw with Fatfield as part of the A182 road. The bridge was opened in 1975 and is named after the former settlement of Chartershaugh, which once stood on a site near the bridge.

Next bridge upstream	River Wear	Next bridge downstream
New Bridge (Q99776242) (Lambton Estate)	Chartershaugh Bridge; Grid reference NZ309536	Penshaw Bridge
