= George Dames Burtchaell =

Irish genealogist (1853–1921)

- Born: 12 June 1853
- Died: 18 August 1921 (aged 68)
- Education: Trinity College Dublin
- Occupation: Genealogist

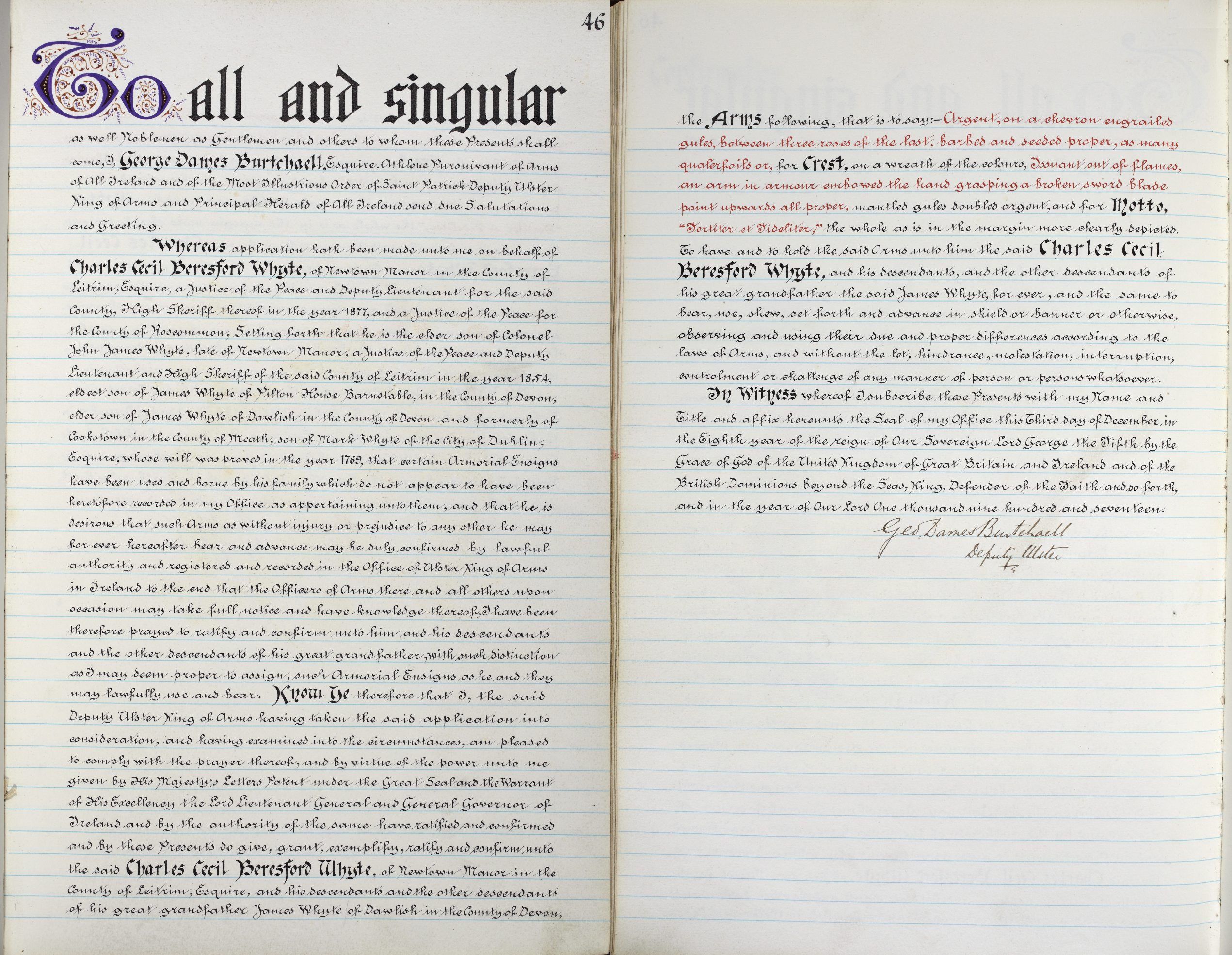
1917 copy confirmation of Whyte arms, by George Dames Burtchaell (Dublin: National Library of Ireland, Genealogical Office: Ms.111B, fol.46)

George Dames Burtchaell, KC, MA, LLB, MRIA, JP (12 June 1853 – 18 August 1921) was an Irish genealogist.

== Education ==
Burtchaell was educated at Kilkenny College and Trinity College, Dublin.

== Career ==
- Barrister King's Inns, 1879
- KC 1918
- Fellow, Royal Society of Antiquaries of Ireland, 1891
- Assistant Secretary and Treasurer, Royal Society of Antiquaries of Ireland 1899
- Vice-President, Royal Society of Antiquaries of Ireland 1909–14
- Athlone Pursuivant of Arms, 1908
- Member of Council of Royal Irish Academy, 1915–18
- Deputy Ulster King of Arms, 1910–11

== Works ==
- Alumni Dublinenses : a register of the students, graduates, professors and provosts of Trinity College, Dublin, 1593–1860: London: Williams and Norgate, three volumes, 1924; Dublin : A. Thom & Co., 1935; (with Thomas Sadleir)
- "Genealogical Memoirs of the members of parliament for the county and city of Kilkenny from the earliest on record to the present time; and for the boroughs of Callan, Thomastown, Inistioge, Gowran, St. Canice or Irishtown, and Knocktopher, from their enfranchisement to the Union" Dublin : Sealy & Co., 1888
- "The Knights of England: a complete record from the earliest time to the present day of the knights of all the Orders of Chivalry in England, Scotland and Ireland, and of Knights Bachelors Incorporating a complete list of Knights Bachelors dubbed in Ireland": London : Sherratt & Hughes, 1906 (with William Arthur Shaw)
