= Sunderland Arc =

- Company type: Non-profit
- Industry: Regeneration
- Founded: 2002
- Headquarters: Sunderland, England
- Key people: John Anderson, (Chairman); Tom Macartney CEO 2002-2007, David Walker CEO 2007 - 2010
- Website: www.sunderlandarc.co.uk

Sunderland Arc was a privately owned, non-profit, urban regeneration company based in Sunderland, North East England. It ceased operations in 2011.

== History ==
The Sunderland arc Task Group was originally appointed in June 2002 by the former Trade and Industry Secretary, Rt. Hon. Stephen Byers MP.

This followed the closures and associated job losses at Grove Cranes and the Vaux Brewery, both of which were key private employers in traditional industries close to the City Centre. The Task Group was charged with developing and implementing a strategic vision to tackle the severe economic and social problems facing a substantial area of Sunderland and its communities.

The resulting framework, set out a fifteen-year vision for the Sunderland arc area that would radically transform the heart of Sunderland. The strategic objectives outlined in the framework are detailed below.

• To accelerate the revival of Sunderland, integrating major physical redevelopment with comprehensive social regeneration in support of the Government's National Strategy for Neighbourhood Renewal and the Urban White Paper.

• To accelerate redevelopment of the former Vaux, Holmeside and Farringdon Row sites ensuring that end uses support Sunderland arc's four strategic programmes – raising aspirations, creating sustainable neighbourhoods, developing ICT and the promotion of key development sites within the relevant planning framework and in support of the rest of the city.

• To pursue sustainability of the environment and development of community assets to underpin regeneration in active support of Local Agenda 21.

• To support the Deputy Prime Minister's major initiative and pilot exciting new ways of promoting ‘joined up’ service and regeneration delivery, including neighbourhood management and effective local consultation following the very successful community visioning exercise.

• To develop innovative delivery mechanisms, which will maximise the impact of public and private investment in the heart of Sunderland over a fifteen-year period. TWO

The boundary of the Sunderland arc area stretched along the south bank of the River Wear from Claxheugh Rock in the west to the Port in the east. The boundaries also encompass the Stadium of Light, St. Peter's Campus and the National Glass Centre on the north bank.

The Company's Board for the first five years was chaired by leading industrialist Bryan Sanderson, then John Anderson, a substantial business figure from the NE of England. The experienced Executive Team was led by Chief Executive Tom Macartney who had previously led the successfully regeneration of the Gorbals of Glasgow. David Waker followed on from Tom Macartney and led the arc for three years.

The priorities for development in the five years included bringing forward the following substantial sites:

• the former Vaux Brewery/Farringdon Row Site, • the historic quarter of Sunniside, • Holmeside, • Stadium Park and Sheepfolds, • Sunderland Strategic Transport Corridor.

The Arc made significant progress in the Sunniside area, with the opening of a new arts centre, several new bars and restaurants, new business space, a new leisure complex incorporating a bowling alley and multiplex cinema, hundreds of new apartments, and a new area of public art and sculpture on a newly landscaped Sunniside Gardens. The Sunniside district, which lies on the eastern fringe of Sunderland City Centre, was awarded with the North East Renaissance Award from the Royal Institution of Chartered Surveyors.

One of the main thrusts over the first five years of the arc was the company moving a proposed Tesco Extra from a city centre site, the former Vaux Brewery site. For over five years Tesco did not wish to move and a very substantial planning dispute involving large teams of planners, architects, surveyors and legal experts ensued.

== See also ==
- Spirit of Sunderland
- New River Wear Crossing
