= John Gibb (engineer) =

Scottish civil engineer and contractor

- Born: 13 October 1776
- Died: 3 December 1850 (aged 74) (Note: A date of 3 November 1850 is given in Min. Proc. Inst. Civ. Eng. (1851), p. 85)
- Occupation: Engineer

John Gibb (1776–1850) was a Scottish civil engineer and contractor whose work included the construction of harbours, bridges, roads, lighthouses, and railways in the United Kingdom, primarily in Scotland. He was a close associate of Thomas Telford, who employed him on many of his civil engineering projects during the first half of the 19th century.

== Life ==
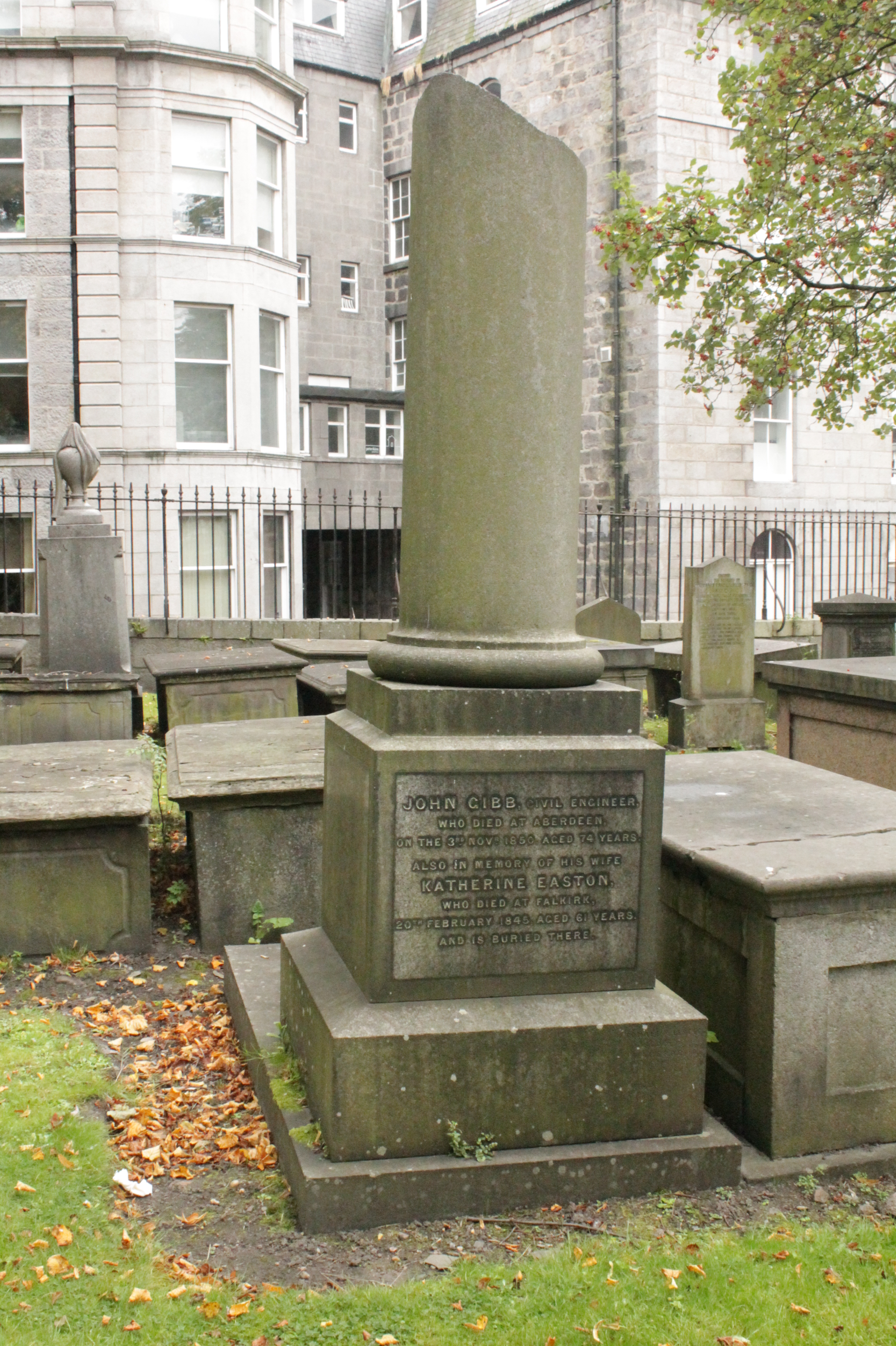
The grave of John Gibb, engineer, churchyard of the Kirk of St Nicholas

John Gibb was baptised on 13 October 1776, the youngest son of William Gibb (1736-1791) of Kirkcows, near Falkirk, Scotland, a contractor. He served an apprenticeship as a mechanic, after which he was employed by James Porteous (his brother in law) on the works of the Lancaster Canal, then by John Dalgleish Easton on the docks at Leith. In 1803 he married Easton's daughter, Catherine.

From 1805, he was employed under John Rennie on the harbour at Greenock for four years .

On the works at Greenock, his abilities brought him to the notice of Thomas Telford, who installed him as resident engineer for harbour works at Aberdeen Harbour, with a salary of £250 a year; at Aberdeen, he spent six years extending and fortifying the harbour, repairing the south pier, constructing a breakwater and north pier, as well as dock walls for new docks. He also was the first to use a steam dredger in Scotland, employed on the works. In 1817, during a lull in the works he resigned his position.

Gibb became a close associate of Telford, working as contractor or resident engineer for him on various projects over a thirty-year period; from 1817 he worked under Telford on works including harbours at Peterhead, Cullen, Banff, and Nairn.

Whilst working for Telford Gibb was encountered by the poet Robert Southey, then touring Scotland, who described him as ".. that obliging, good-natured, useful and skilful man, Mr Gibb.". He became involved in the quarrying and supply of aberdeen granite, in association with the company of Messrs. Jolliffe and Banks, as well as surveying the River Dee at Chester, and worked on a turnpike road from Glasgow to Carlisle. In 1823, he began employment under Robert Stevenson on the construction of lighthouses, and from 1827 to 1829 worked under the Commissioners of Highland Roads and Bridges; his work included the construction of the Don bridge near Aberdeen.

In 1829, he returned to works under Telford, and was involved in the construction of the Wet dock at Aberdeen, of the Dean Bridge in Edinburgh and, in 1835, the Glasgow Bridge. In 1836, under Thomas Elliot Harrison he was contracted for the construction of the Victoria bridge.

His last major contract was works on the Edinburgh and Glasgow Railway (built c. 1840), including the construction of the Almond Valley Viaduct, and the Winchburgh Tunnel, designed by noted Scottish railway engineer John Miller. An error in his tender estimate for the cost of the viaduct led to his incurring a loss of £40,000 on a construction cost of £130,000.

His wife, Katherine Easton, died on 20 February 1845. John Gibb died on 3 December 1850. They are buried in the churchyard of the Kirk of St Nicholas. The grave lies in the eastern section of the main area south of the church.

=== Legacy ===
Gibb's only son, Alexander Gibb (1804-1867), joined him after studying under Telford and the two worked together as John Gibb and Son on several contracts from the 1820s onwards. After his father's death, Alexander continued to work as a civil engineer and in the quarrying of granite in Aberdeen.

Gibb's direct descendants included grandsons Sir George Gibb and Alexander Easton Gibb, and great-grandson Sir Alexander Gibb. Both Alexander Gibbs were notable Civil Engineers; in 1922 Sir Alexander established what became the biggest civil engineering consultancy in the United Kingdom, Sir Alexander Gibb & Partners.

=== See also ===
- Profile, gracesguide.co.uk. Accessed 7 January 2023.
