= Spirit of Sunderland =

The Spirit of Sunderland was a skyscraper proposed for Sunderland, North East England, by the designs of Sunderland Arc and Thornfield Properties Ltd. The tower was part of the Holmeside Triangle regeneration plan, a project to establish the area as a thriving, attractive modern area of retail.

The proposed tower had 33 storeys, and at 100 m (328 ft), it would have been the tallest building in the United Kingdom north of Bridgewater Place, Leeds, West Yorkshire. It would have stood on the current site of the 'Independent', a nightclub and live music venue, enjoying excellent access to Tyne and Wear Metro services at Sunderland Central and Park Lane, as well as regional and London-bound Grand Central train services at Sunderland Central.

On 26 June 2009 Thornfield Properties signed a £180 million agreement to build the Holmeside development along with Sunderland Arc. However, the project was axed in late 2010 after Thornfield Ventures – one of the companies behind the Holmeside Triangle – collapsed into administration.

== See also ==
- New River Wear Crossing
