= Cox Green Footbridge =

Bridge in North East England

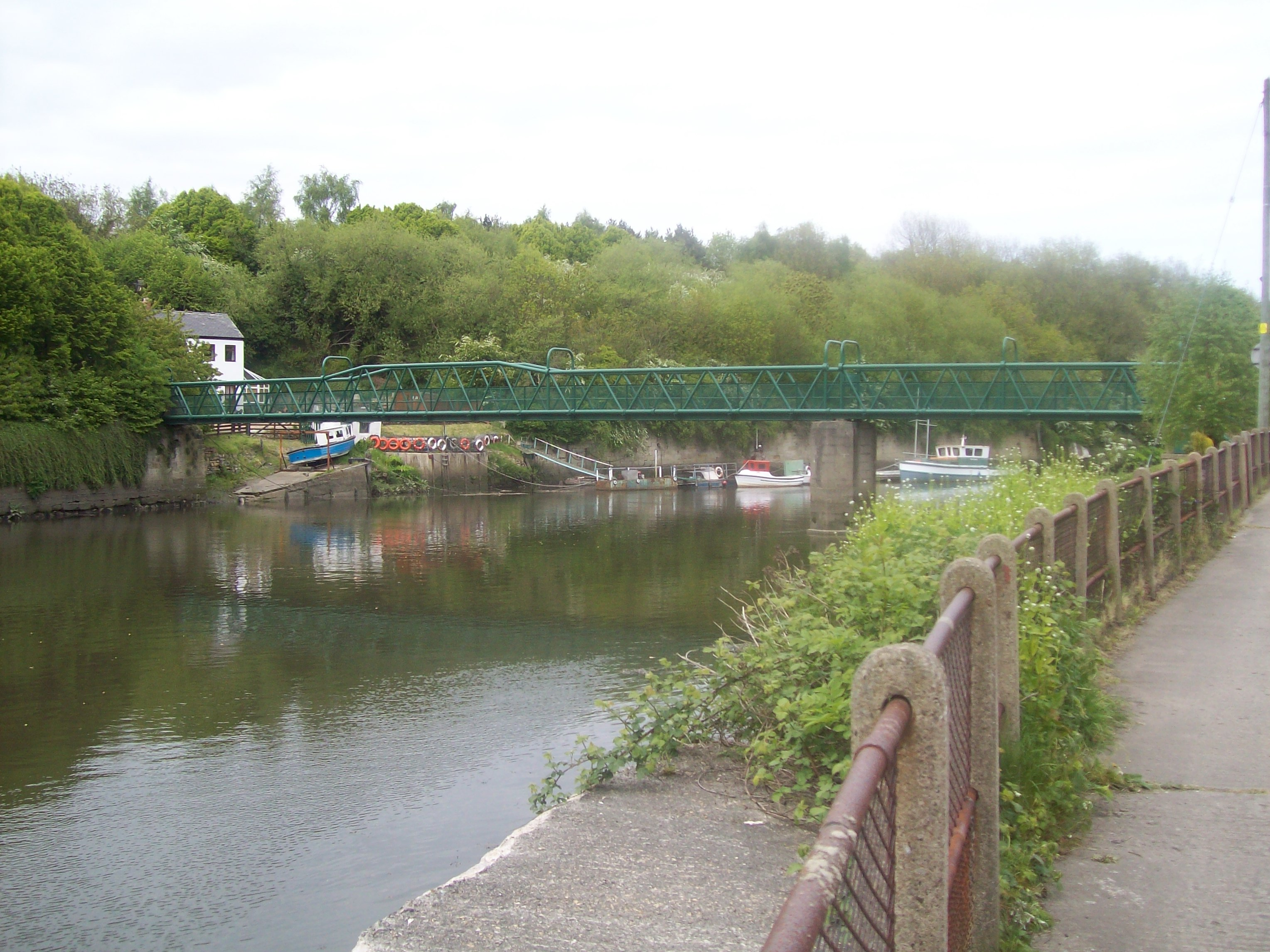
- Coordinates: 54°53′27″N 1°29′39″W
- OS grid reference: NZ324552
- Carries: Pedestrians
- Next upstream: Victoria Viaduct
- Next downstream: Hylton Viaduct

History
- Replaces: Ferry

Location
- Interactive map of Cox Green Footbridge

Cox Green Footbridge is a footbridge spanning the River Wear in North East England, linking Cox Green and Washington Staithes. The bridge opened in 1958, replacing a former ferry route.

Next bridge upstream	River Wear	Next bridge downstream
Victoria Viaduct; Leamside line	Cox Green Footbridge; Grid reference NZ324552	Hylton Viaduct; A19 road
