= Penshaw Bridge =

Fatfield Bridge
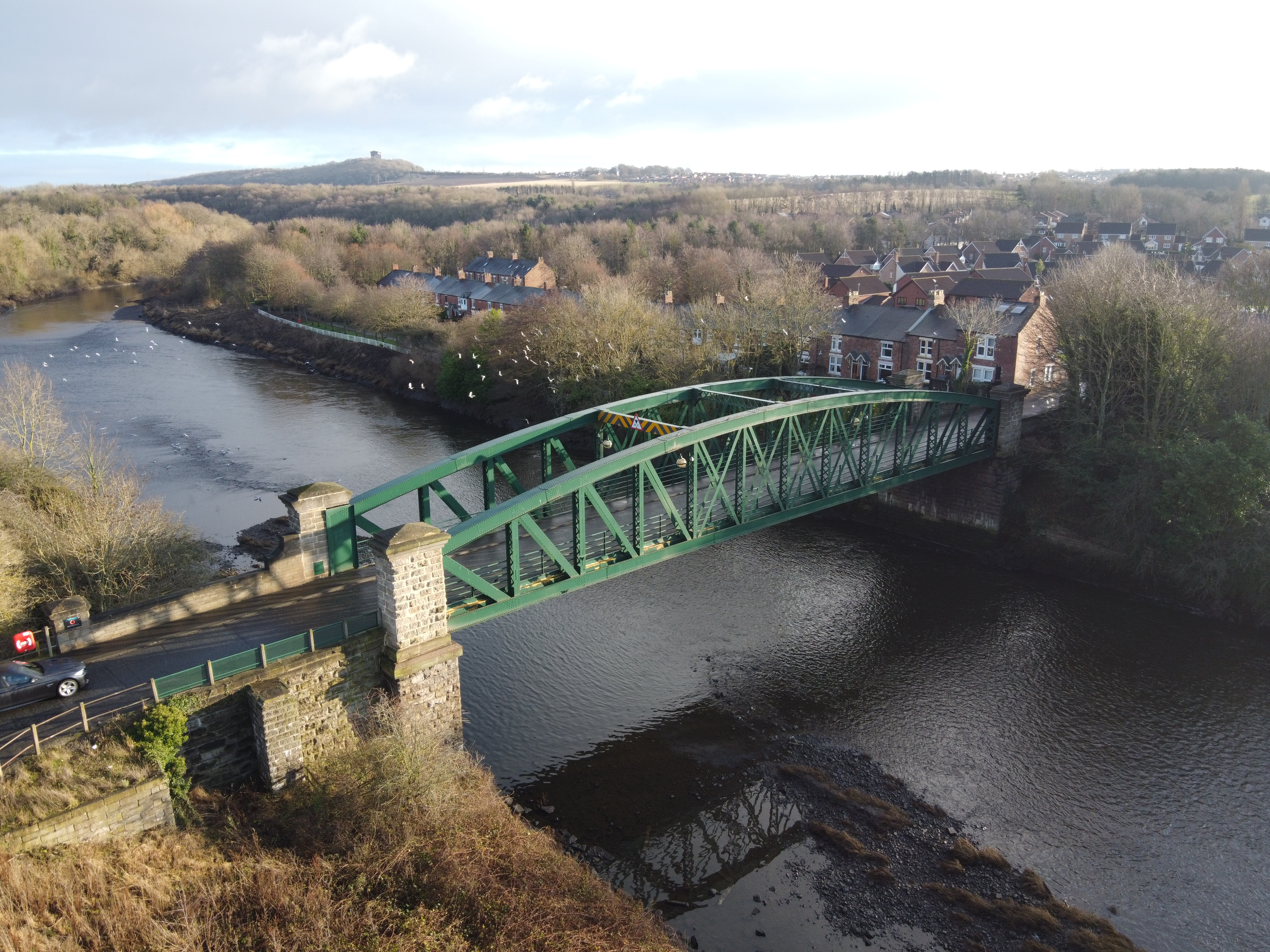
- Fatfield Bridge in 2019
- Coordinates: 54.8800°N 1.5151°W
- OS grid reference: NZ312540
- Carries: Motor vehicles
- Crosses: River Wear
- Locale: Sunderland, England
- Other name(s): Fatfield Bridge
- Preceded by: Chartershaugh Bridge
- Followed by: Victoria Viaduct

History
- Construction cost: £8,000
- Opened: 29 January 1890

Penshaw Bridge, also known as Fatfield Bridge, is a road traffic bridge spanning the River Wear in North East England, linking Penshaw with Fatfield. The bridge was opened on 29 January 1890.

Next bridge upstream	River Wear	Next bridge downstream
Chartershaugh Bridge; A182	Penshaw Bridge; Grid reference NZ312540	Victoria Viaduct; Leamside Line
