= Hylton Viaduct =

Road and pedestrian bridge over the River Wear

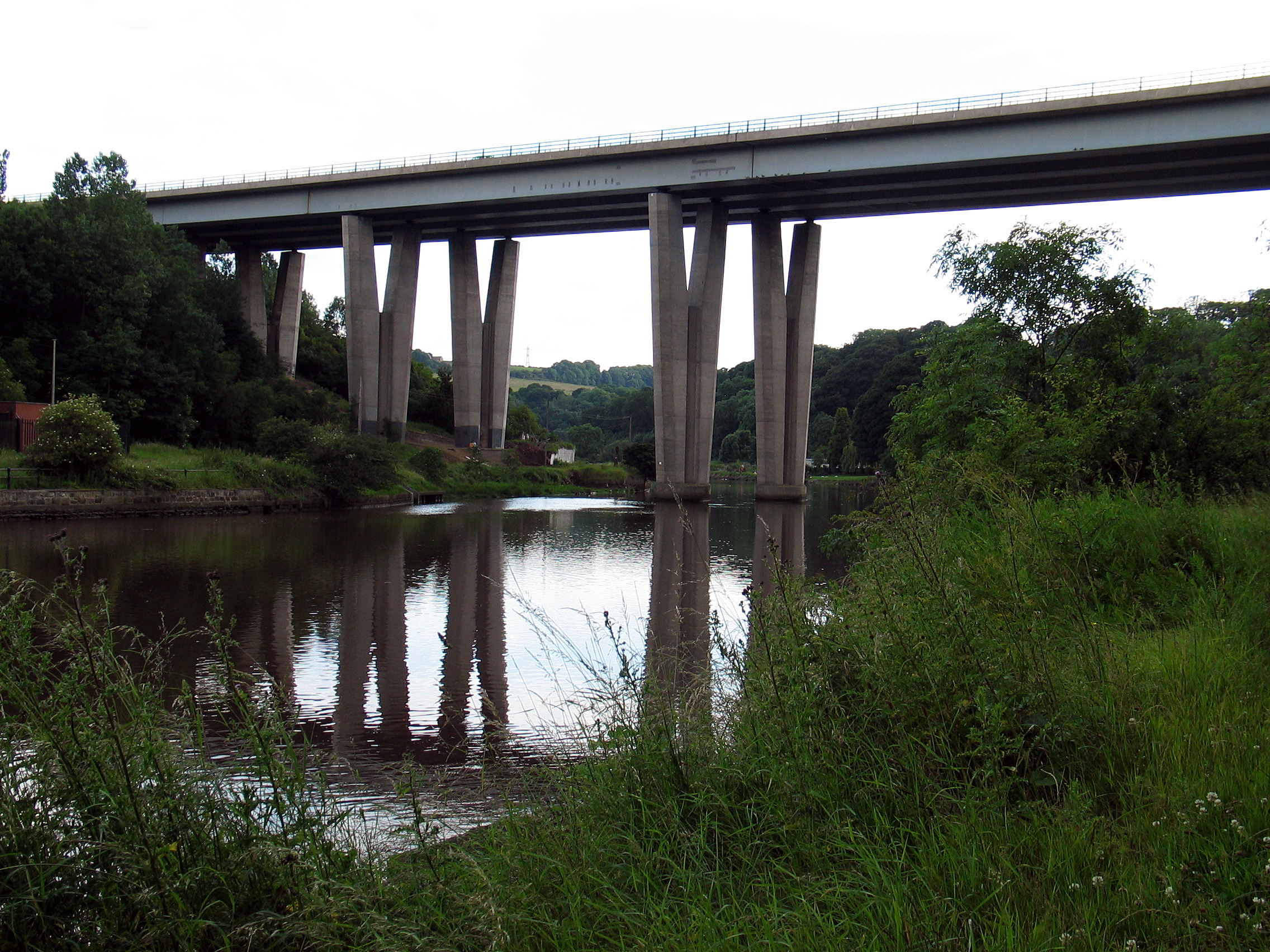
- Hylton Viaduct viewed from North Hylton in 2007.
- Coordinates: 54°54′16″N 1°27′30″W
- OS grid reference: NZ347567
- Carries: A19; Motor vehicles; Pedestrians
- Next upstream: Cox Green footbridge
- Next downstream: Northern Spire Bridge

Characteristics
- Design: Box girder bridge

Location
- Interactive map of Hylton Viaduct

Hylton Viaduct is a road traffic and pedestrian bridge spanning the River Wear in North East England, linking North Hylton and South Hylton in Sunderland as the A19 road. The steel box girder bridge was opened in 1974 by short hand typist and secretary Jean Temple and is above a former chain ferry route which ceased in 1915.

Next bridge upstream	River Wear	Next bridge downstream
Cox Green Footbridge	Hylton Viaduct; Grid reference NZ347567	Northern Spire Bridge; A1231
