= Athlone Pursuivant =

Officer of arms in Ireland (1552–1921)

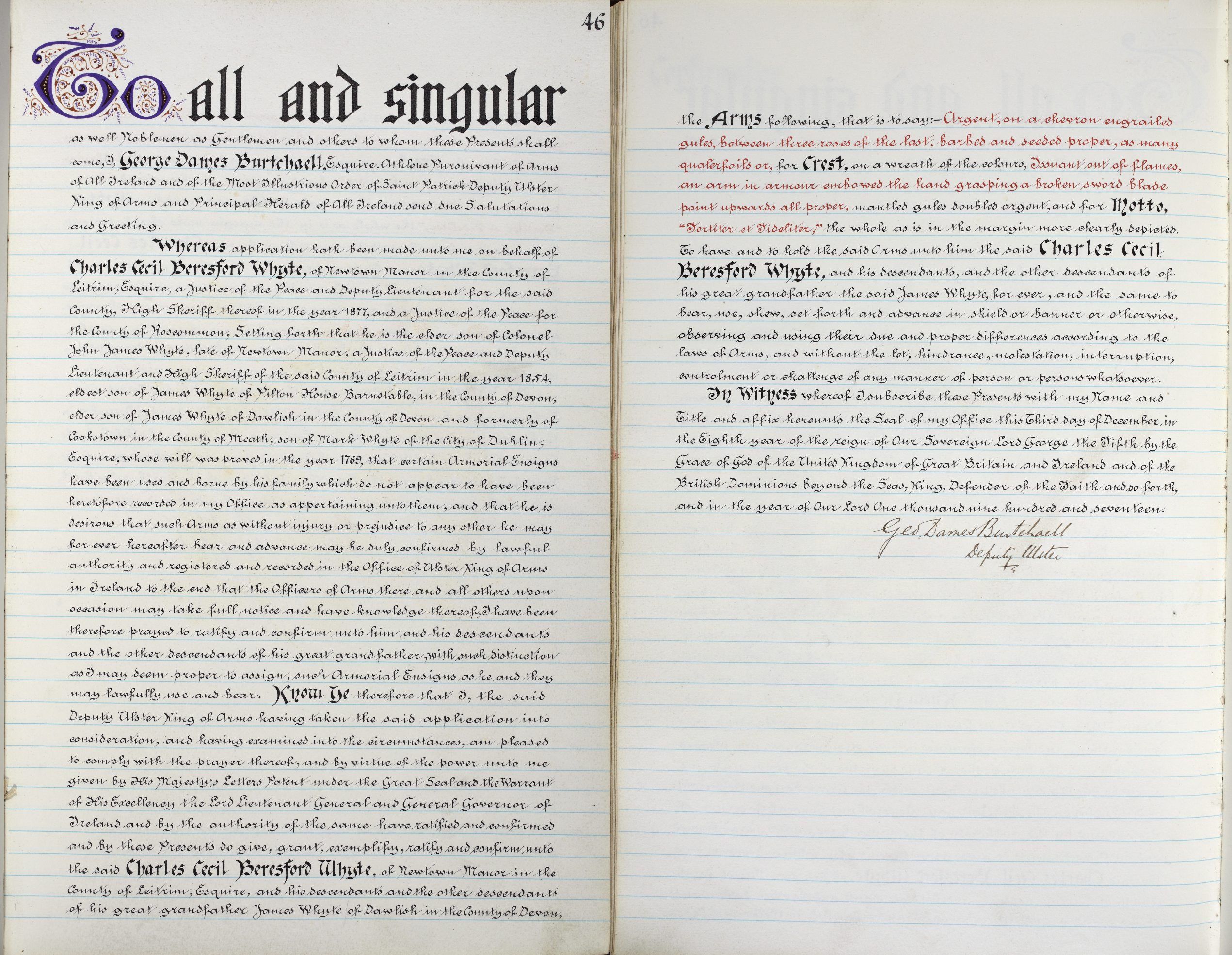
Confirmation of arms of the descendants of James Whyte of Dawlish, issued in 1917 by George Dames Burtchaell, Athlone Pursuivant of Arms.

Athlone Pursuivant of Arms (or Athlone Pursuivant) was a junior officer of arms in Ireland, founded 1552 during the reign of Edward VI, King of England and King of Ireland, and was named for the town of Athlone, which is partly in Co. Roscommon (in the province of Connacht). The other heraldic offices of Ireland being Ireland King of Arms, 1392-1485, the Ulster King of Arms (Ulster) from 1552, the Dublin Herald (Leinster) and the Cork Herald (Munster). Accordingly, an officer was named for each of the four traditional provinces of Ireland. From 1943 the Ulster King of Arms was merged with the Norroy King of Arms as the Norroy and Ulster King of Arms with jurisdiction for Northern Ireland. Heraldic matters in the Republic of Ireland are now handled by the office of the Chief Herald of Ireland (a part of the Genealogical Office in the National Library).

The Order of St. Patrick was instituted by George III 5 Feb 1783 and the Athlone Pursuivant became one of its officers thereafter, being 12th in order of precedence. There are no living members of the Order.

== Literary reference ==
James Joyce mentioned the office in 'Ulysses' and again in 'Finnegans Wake' as the "Athlone Poursuivant".

== List of holders with recorded years in office ==
- 1552 Philip Butler, illegitimate son of Bartholomew Butler, gentleman, Ulster King of Arms; Butler was the first holder, appointed on midsummer day 22 June 1552 (or on 16 Jun 1552 according to Lodge)
- 1568 Leonard Palmer
- 1570 Edward Fletcher, appointed 20 Mar 1569/70, who gave the Four Provinces Flag of Ireland, succeeded by William Cotgrave
- 1578 William Cottgreve or Cotgrave, appointed 19 Apr 1578
- William Laveret, appointed 28 mar 1595, 17 Jul 1608
- 1608 Alvane, alias Albon or Albone Levert or Laveret, son of William Leveret above, appointed 17 Jul 1608, d. 1638
- 1661/2 to 1665 Sir Richard Carney, Knt. appointed 15 Feb 1661/2 who became Ulster King of Arms
- 1672 Richard Carney jun. son of Sir Richard Carney above, appointed 29 Apr 1672, 25 May 1683
- 1683 Richard Carney, son of Richard Carney jun., above appointed 25 May 1683
- 1690 James Terry, appointed by James II; (d. 1725) took his seal of office and his heraldic records with him to France. A collection of his pedigrees and papers has been published in bookform
- 1700 Charles Ashfield, appointed 26 Apr 1700
- 1700 Mr. Joseph Moland, appointed 12 Jul 1700, 8 Aug 1702
- 1711/12, 1714, 1727 Philip Ridgate, Esq., appointed 8 Feb 1711/12, 15 Dec 1714, 19 Sep 1727
- 1745/6 William Hawkins, son of William Hawkins, Ulster King of Arms, appointed 28 Jan 1745/6
- 1749 George Winstanley, appointed 8 Sep 1749, 6 Mar 1761
- 1780-1783 Thomas Meredyth Winstanley, appointed 19 Dec 1780, later Dublin Herald
- 1783, 1804 George Twisleton Ridsdale, Esq. appointed, Dublin Castle, June 13, 1783. Proclamation of Peace at Dublin, Dublin Castle October 23, 1783 "...Athlone pursuivant made an oyez, and Ulster King at Arms read his Majesty's Proclamation aloud..."
- 1807-1820 William Betham
- 1817 George J. Ridsdale, appointed 27 May 1783
- 1820-1827 Joseph Rock, Esq. in office during the King's (George IV) visit to Ireland
- 1827-1829 Molyneux Cecil John Betham
- 1829 William Crawford, esq.
- 1865 Captain Robert Smith, died 1882
- 1883 Bernard Louis Burke (b. 1861 - d. 1892 unm.), son of Sir John Bernard Burke and Barbara Frances MacEvoy
- 1892-removed 1899 John Edward Burke
- 1899-1907 Henry Claude Blake
- Feb 1907-Nov 1907 Francis Bennett-Goldney (b. 1865 - killed 1918). The insignia of the Order of St. Patrick known generally as the Irish Crown Jewels, were stolen from the Bedford Tower in Dublin Castle shortly before a visit by the Order's Sovereign, King Edward VII.
- 1908-1921 George Dames Burtchaell. In 1909 he was additionally appointed Registrar of the Office of Arms.

On the death of Burtchaell, Nevile Wilkinson suggested Thomas Sadleir to succeed the deceased. However, Sadleir declined to accept the offer. He operated the Office of Arms in the capacity of Deputy Ulster King of Arms. The post of Athlone Pursuivant had never been filled since then.

== Deputy Athlone Pursuivants - List of holders with recorded years in office ==
- 1874-1882 Joseph Nugent Lentaigne
- 1882-1883 Bernard Louis Burke

== See also ==
- Pursuivant
- Genealogical Office and Chief Herald of Ireland
- Heraldry

== Notes ==
- Thomas Meredyth, previously Athlone Pursuivant, appointed Dublin Herald at Arms, 18 Apr 1783 - Patentee Officers in Ireland 1173-1826 James L. J. Hughes (Irish Manuscripts Commission, 1960)
- The Cork Herald of Arms in 1907 was Pierce Gun Mahony, M.R.I.A. (Journal of the Association for the Preservation of the Memorials of the Dead, Ireland - 1907 Vol. VII No. 2 of Part I., p. 96)
