= Muiris Ó Gormáin =

- Born: 1720; Ulster
- Died: 1794 (aged 73–74)
- Occupations: Bookseller, poet and scribe
- Writing career
- Notable work: Is aoibhinn duit a Éire

Muiris Ó Gormáin (c. 1720–1794) was an Irish bookseller, poet and scribe.

A native of Ulster, Ó Gormáin spent most of his later life in Dublin, where he was acquainted with Aodh Ó Dálaigh of the Ó Neachtain circle of scribes.

Faulkner’s Dublin Journal of 24 July 1766 contains the following advert by Ó Gormáin:

"Whereas the Irish, the ancient language of this Nation, hath long been neglected; an Evil justly complained of, as it renders Gentlemen unable to have Recourse to the many Chronicles and Compositions still preserved among us, relative to the ancient State of this Kingdom, its Arts, Sciences and Literature. Therefore, Maurice Gorman, Professor of that Language, offers his Service to the Public, and proposes to lay himself out in his own apartment (at the Sign of the Mashing Keeve in St Mary’s-Lane, Dublin,) every Morning from Ten to Two, for the Instruction of Youth and Others, as wish for their own cultivation, to open Treasures so long locked up. Such Persons who cannot conveniently go to him, shall be attended at their own Houses. N.B. He is perfect Master of the Difficulties attending the Reading and Explaining the ancient Irish Manuscripts in Vellum."

He resided for a while in Belanagare transcribing material for Charles O'Conor (historian). He helped Charlotte Brooke in compiling and translating Reliques of Irish Poetry (1789). However, Peadar Ó Doirnín mocked him for a supposed lack of competence in English.

Other people for whom he worked or associated with included Tomás Ó Gormáin, Matthew Young (Bishop of Clonfert), Charles Vallancey, John Fergus, Richard Tipper, Thomas Leland, Éadbhard Ó Raghallaigh, and Fiachra Mac Brádaigh.

His poems include Is aoibhinn duit a Éire, which Ó Gormáin wrote in 1763 for Hugh Percy, 1st Duke of Northumberland, who became Lord Lieutenant of Ireland. He recycled this for a later incumbent, George Townshend, 1st Marquess Townshend, which caused Énrí Ó Muirgheasa to comment in 1915:

"Poor O’Gorman may have hoped for some recognition of his Irish learning from Townsend, and so his fulsome flattery may have been inspired with a hope of favours to come. Otherwise it is unthinkable that a Gael of the Gaels, such as O’Gorman was, should have lauded so highly an Englishman who fought against his countrymen at Dettingen and Fontenoy ..."

Both a scribe and a teacher, Ó Gormáin has been described as "one of the most sought after scribes as he was employed by many of the leading Irish antiquarians, both Protestant and Catholic, to copy and translate Gaelic manuscripts." During the 1760s and 1770s he compiled very detailed catalogues of book and manuscripts in his possession, as well as his evaluation of them and their value.

According to James Hardiman

"After a long life devoted to the transcription and consequent preservation of numerous volumes of the ancient poetry, tales, annals, etc etc. of Ireland, he died in the greatest poverty in a ground-cellar in Mary’s Lane, Dublin, about 1794; where he was a long time supported by the charity of Mac Entaggart, who was himself a poor man."
