= Queen Alexandra Bridge =

Road and pedestrian bridge over the River Wear

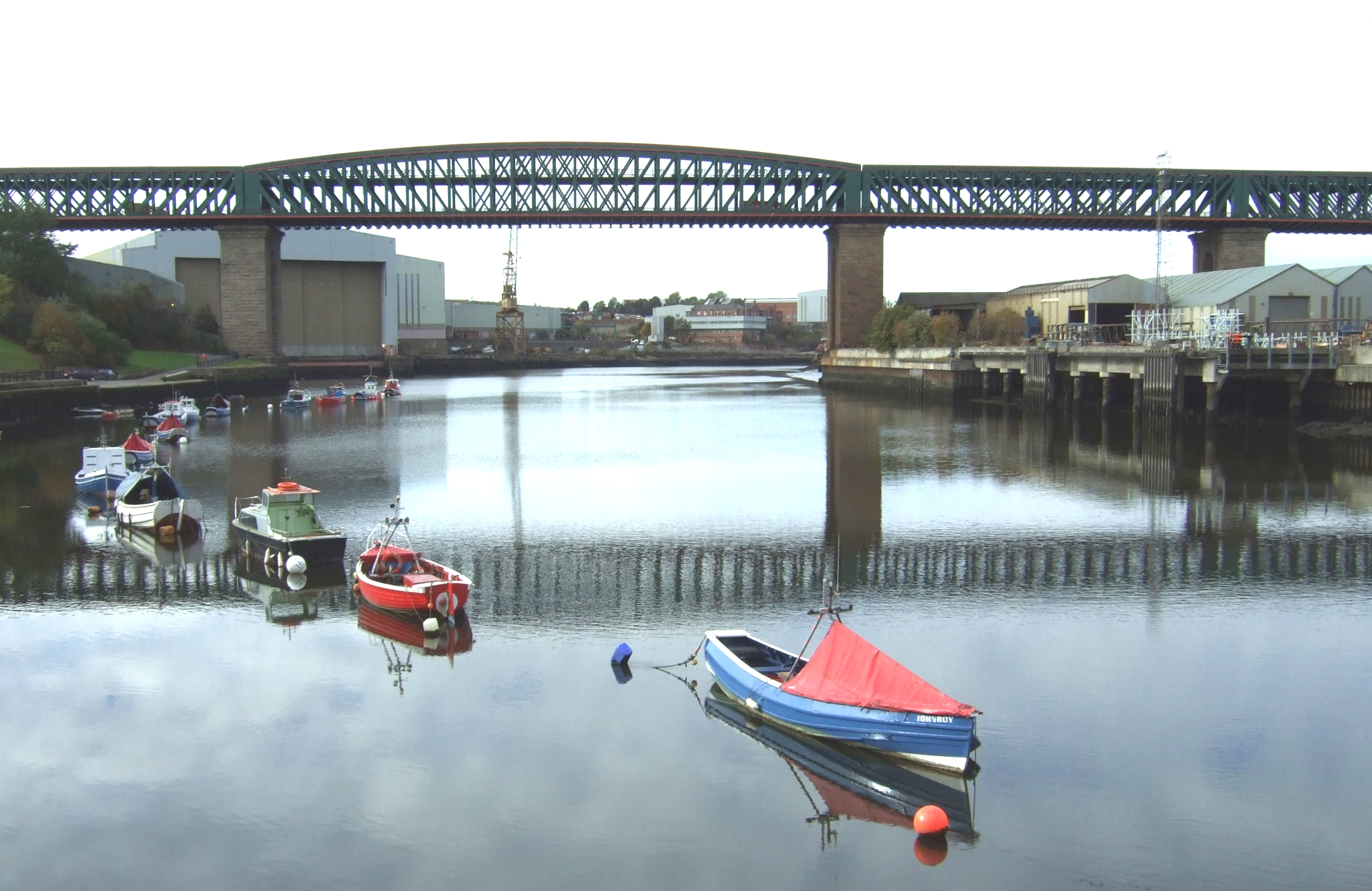
- The Queen Alexandra Bridge in October 2007.
- Coordinates: 54.9138°N 1.4059°W
- OS grid reference: NZ381578
- Carries: B1539; Motor vehicles; Pedestrians
- Crosses: River Wear
- Locale: Wearside

Characteristics
- Design: Truss bridge
- Longest span: 300 ft (91 m)
- Clearance below: 85 ft (26 m)
- No. of lanes: 2

History
- Designer: Charles A. Harrison
- Constructed by: Sir William Arrol & Co.
- Construction start: 1907
- Construction end: 1909
- Construction cost: £450,000
- Opened: 1909
- Inaugurated: 10 June 1909

Statistics

Listed Building – Grade II
- Official name: Queen Alexandra Bridge
- Designated: 4 May 1984
- Reference no.: 1207052

Location
- Interactive map of Queen Alexandra Bridge

The Queen Alexandra Bridge is a road traffic, pedestrian and former railway bridge spanning the River Wear in North East England, linking the Deptford and Southwick areas of Sunderland. The steel truss bridge was designed by Charles A. Harrison (a nephew of Robert Stephenson's assistant). It was built by Sir William Arrol between 1907 and 1909 and officially opened by The Earl of Durham, on behalf of Queen Alexandra on 10 June 1909.

In 1899 the North Eastern Railway and the Sunderland Corporation agreed to build the bridge to improve communications across the river and to connect the coalfields of Annfield Plain and Washington with Sunderland's south docks. Before the completion of the bridge, road traffic crossing the river had to use one of two ferries which crossed below near to where the bridge is today. As the bridge was due to be built near to the successful shipyards of the Wear, a clause in the North Eastern Railway Act 1900 (63 & 64 Vict. c. clxii) required that only one arch span be built over the river to give a clearance of 85 ft (26 m) above high water level.

The approaches to the bridge were completed in 1907 by the Mitchell Brothers of Glasgow. The steel bridge comprises three 200-foot (61 m) spans (weighing 1,000 tonnes each), plus a 300-foot (91 m) main span across the river (weighing 2,600 tonnes), and was the heaviest bridge in the United Kingdom at the time. The bridge was built from each side of the river and the two halves came together at noon on 15 October 1908. In all, a total of 8,500 tonnes of steel, 4,500 tonnes of granite, 60,000 tonnes of red sandstone from Dumfries, and 350,000 bricks were used. The total cost was £450,000 (equivalent to £47.9 million in 2016). The bridge also housed gas and water mains and in later years, high voltage electricity cables and a pumped rising-main for sewage.

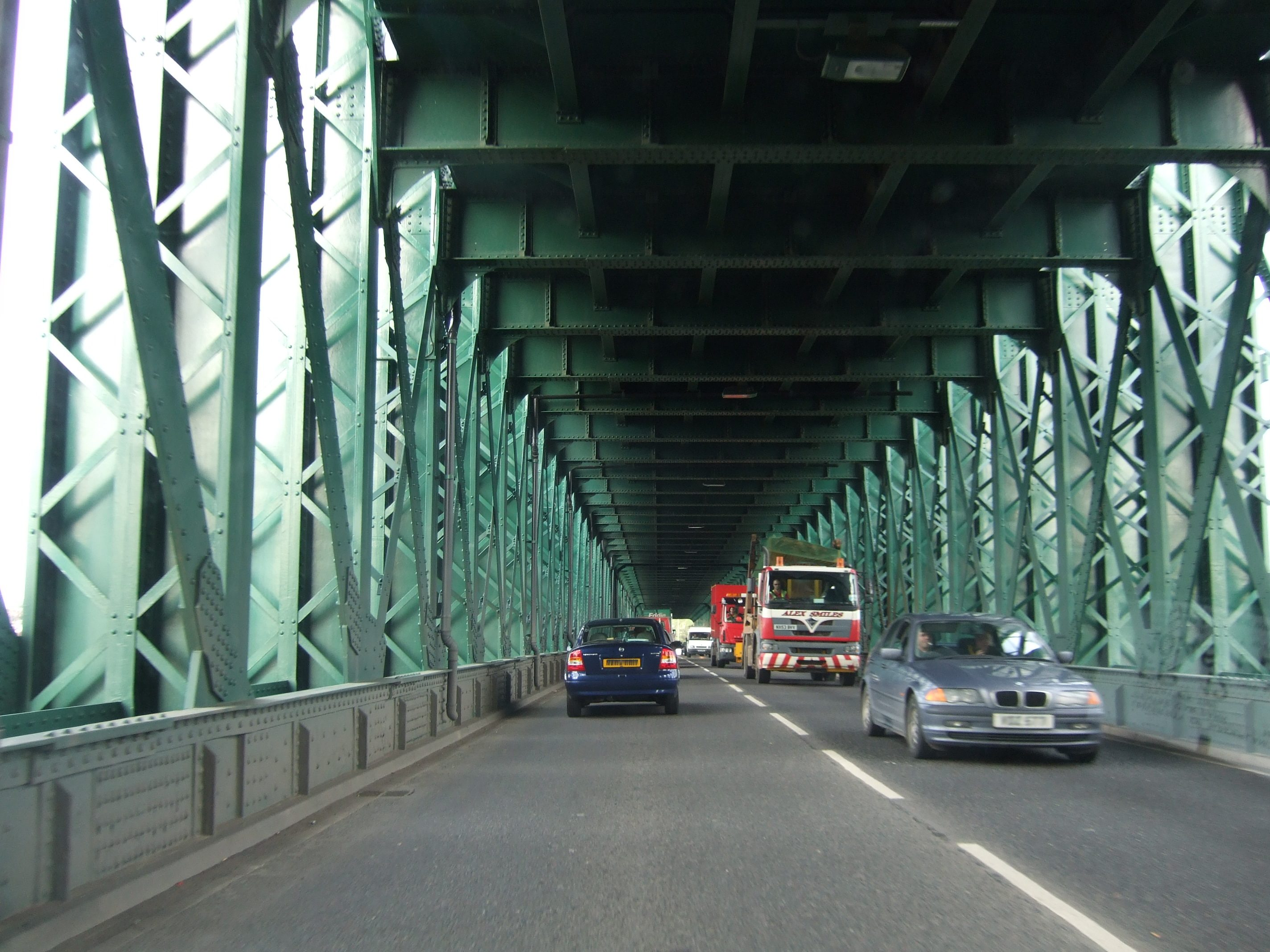
Travelling north.

About six million tonnes of coal passed over the upper-deck annually for export, but the trade rapidly declined at the end of the 1910s. For the last few years only one train per day passed over the bridge. The last goods train ran over in 1921, but the lower-deck continues as a valuable road link. In the Second World War, the upper-deck was used as a searchlight and anti-aircraft platform. The railway and decking at each end of the bridge were finally removed near to the end of the 20th century. A large free standing brick and stone viaduct fragment remains on the north side of the Bridge.

From 21 March 2005, the bridge was temporarily restricted to southbound traffic whilst repainting and repair work was carried out on the 96-year-old structure, which was due to take almost a year to complete. It reopened for both lanes of traffic on 12 October 2006, having been partly closed for 18 months and costing £6.3m in repairs.

Previously classified as part of the A1231, the road across the bridge was reclassified as the B1539 when the Northern Spire Bridge was opened to traffic on 29 August 2018.

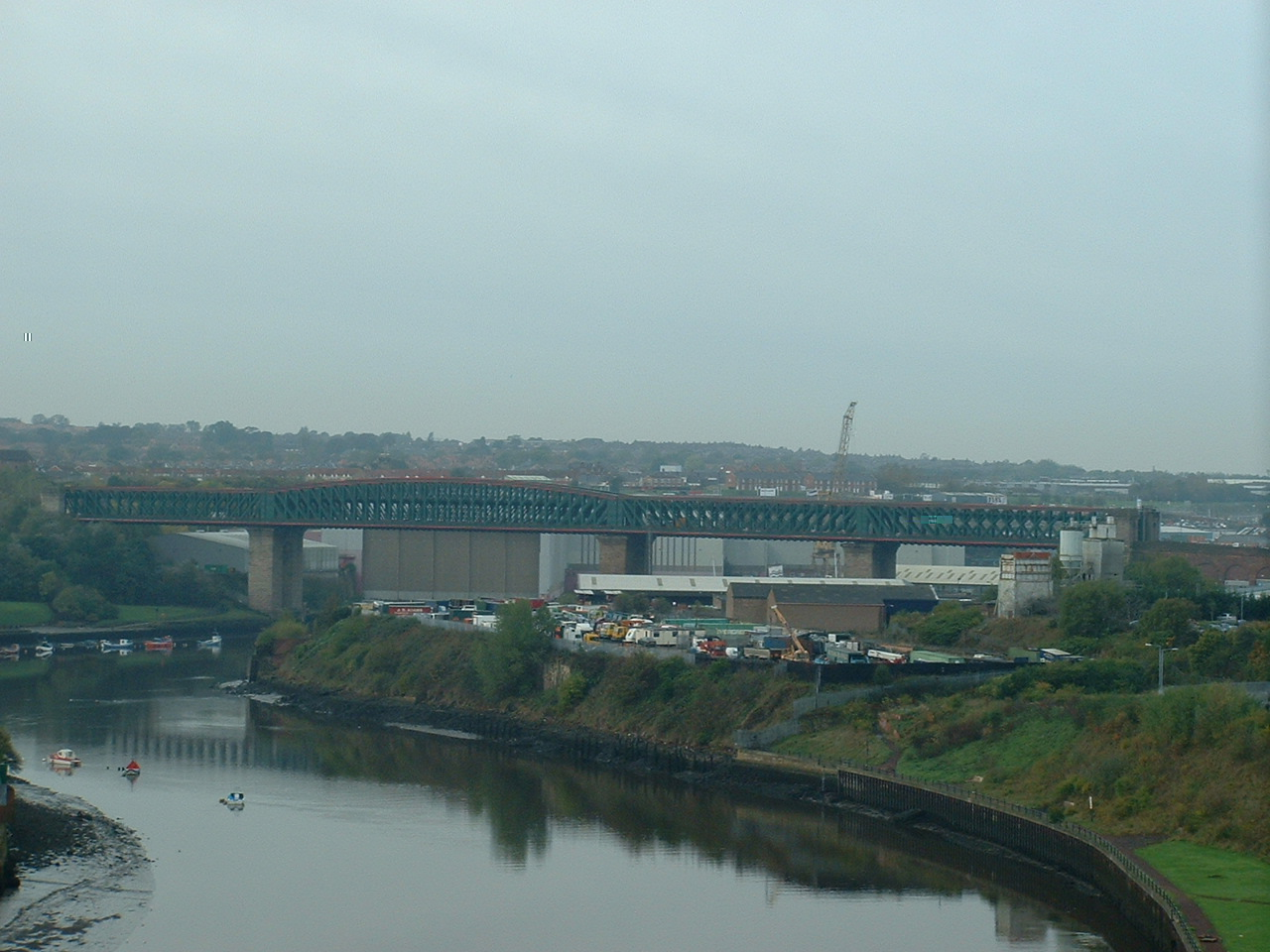

== Sources ==
- National Grid for Learning
- University of Newcastle Upon Tyne

Next bridge upstream	River Wear	Next bridge downstream
Northern Spire Bridge; A1231	Queen Alexandra Bridge; Grid reference NZ381578	Keel Crossing
