= Alumni =

Term for former students of a school

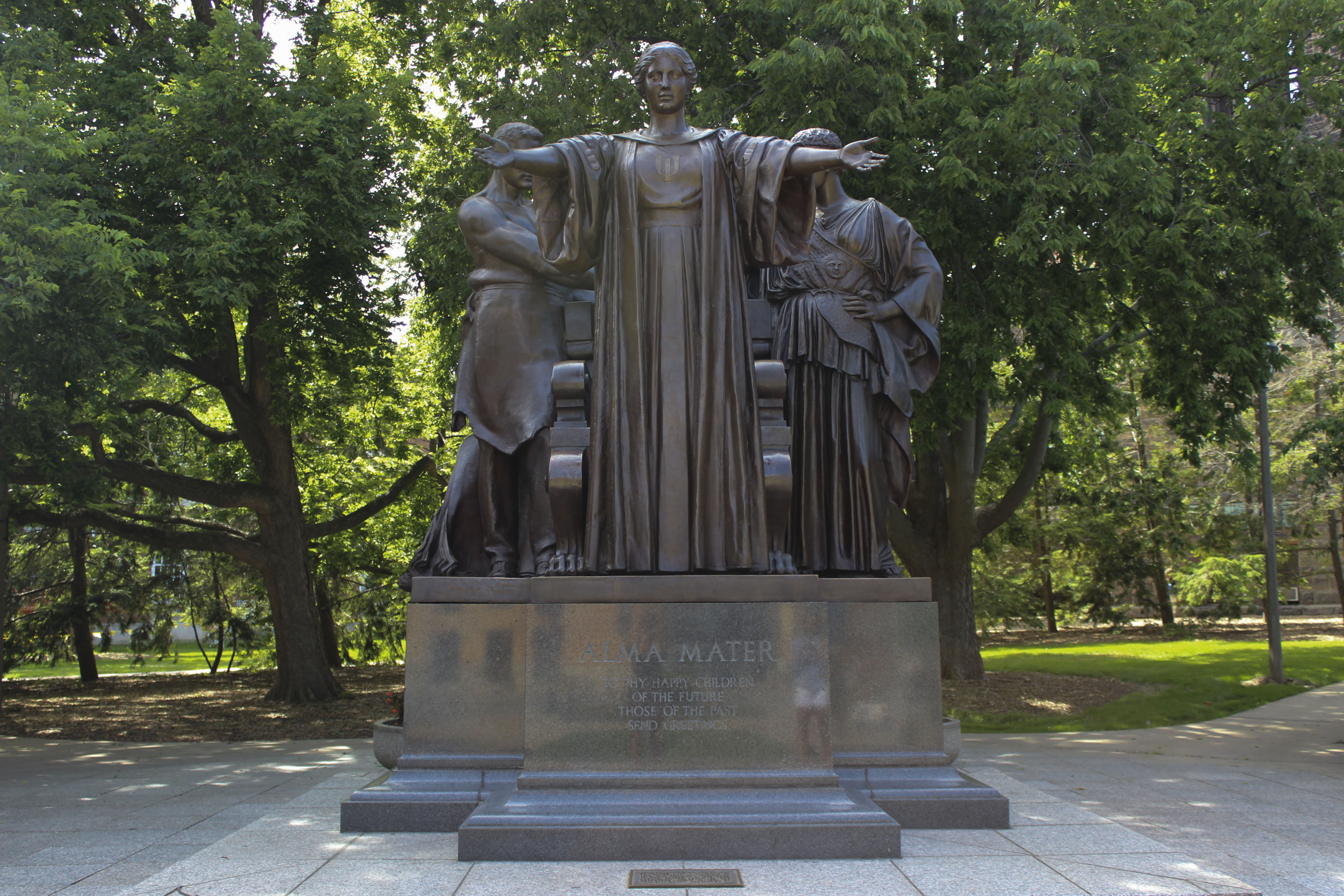
The Latin noun alumnus means "foster son" or "pupil" and is derived from the verb alere "to nourish". B Pictured: Lorado Taft's Alma Mater in Urbana, Illinois.

Alumni (sing.: alumnus (masc) or alumna (fem)) are former students or graduates of a school, college, or university. The feminine plural alumnae is sometimes used for groups of women, and alums (sing.: alum) also spelt alumns (sing.: alumn) as gender-neutral alternatives. The word comes from Latin, meaning nurslings, pupils or foster children, derived from alere "to nourish".

Alumni may or may not have completed their degree. For example, Burt Reynolds was an alumnus of Florida State University but not a graduate.

Alumni can also be former inmates, former employees, former contributors, or former members of an organization.

== Etymology ==
The Latin noun alumnus means "foster son" or "pupil". It is derived from the Latin verb alere "to nourish". Separate, but from the same root, is the adjective almus "nourishing", found in the phrase alma mater, a title for a person's home university.

Pronunciation
	alumnus	alumna	alumni	alumnae
English	/əˈlʌmnəs/ ə-LUM-nəs	/əˈlʌmnə/ -nə	/əˈlʌmnaɪ/ -nye	/əˈlʌmniː/ -nee, also US: /-naɪ/ -nye
Latin (Classical)	[aˈlʊmnʊs]	[aˈlʊmna]	[aˈlʊmniː]	[aˈlʊmnae̯]
Latin (Ecclesiastical)	[aˈlumnus]	[aˈlumna]	[aˈlumni]	[aˈlumne]

== Usage in Roman law ==
In Latin, alumnus is a legal term (Roman law) to describe a child placed in fosterage. According to John Boswell, the word "is nowhere defined in relation to status, privilege, or obligation." Citing the research of Henri Leclercq, Teresa Nani, and Beryl Rawson, who studied the many inscriptions about alumni, Boswell concluded that it referred to exposed children who were taken into a household where they were "regarded as somewhere between an heir and a slave, partaking in different ways of both categories." Despite the warmth of feelings between the parent and child, "an alumnus might be treated both as a beloved child and as a household servant."

== Usage ==
An alumnus or alumna is a former student or a graduate of an educational institution (school, college, university). According to the United States Department of Education, the term alumnae is used in conjunction with either women's colleges or a female group of students. The term alumni is used in conjunction with either men's colleges, a male group of students, or a mixed group of students:

In accordance with the rules of grammar governing the inflexion of nouns in the Romance languages, the masculine plural alumni is correctly used for groups composed of both sexes: the alumni of Princeton University.

The term is sometimes informally shortened to "alum" (optional plural "alums"). This is increasingly being used more formally as a gender-neutral alternative. However, and for this latter purpose, the option "alumn" and "alumns" are also used in some institutions in Australia, Europe and the UK.

The words "alum/alums" and "alumn/alumns" (pronounced with a silent "n") are both pronounced with the accent on the second syllable (al-UM), as opposed to the chemical compound alum and its plural, "alums" (pron. AL-um).

Many universities have alumni offices that coordinate fundraising and offer benefits to registered alumni. Alumni reunions are popular events at many institutions. These may be organized by alumni offices or by alumni associations, and are often social occasions for fundraising. Full membership of alumni associations is sometimes limited just to graduates rather than all alumni, e.g. at Harvard University. Universities with validation agreements may limit some alumni benefits to graduates who studied at that university rather than at validated institutions.

In British English, the terms "old boy" or "old girl" are often preferred for a former pupil of a primary or secondary school, while universities refer to their former students as alumni.

Some universities, including the University of Cambridge, the University of California, San Francisco and Yale University, include former postdoctoral researchers as alumni, in recognition of the trainee status of such positions. Others, such as the Massachusetts Institute of Technology, consider them 'associate alumni', without full access to alumni benefits.

Some higher education institutions, particularly those with a history as women's colleges or women-only universities (such as St. Hilda’s College, University of Oxford), have chosen to retain the terms alumna (fem. sg.) and alumnae (fem. pl.) after becoming co-ed, reflecting institutional continuity with their historical identity.

== See also ==
- Category:Alumni by educational institution
- Alumni Cantabrigienses: A Biographical List of All Known Students, Graduates and Holders of Office at the University of Cambridge, from the Earliest Times to 1900
- Alumni Oxonienses: The Members of the University of Oxford

== Bibliography ==
- Boswell, John (1988). The Kindness of Strangers:The Abandonment of Children in Western Europe from Late Antiquity to the Renaissance. New York: Pantheon. ISBN 9780226067124.
