= Victoria Viaduct =

Railway viaduct over the River Wear

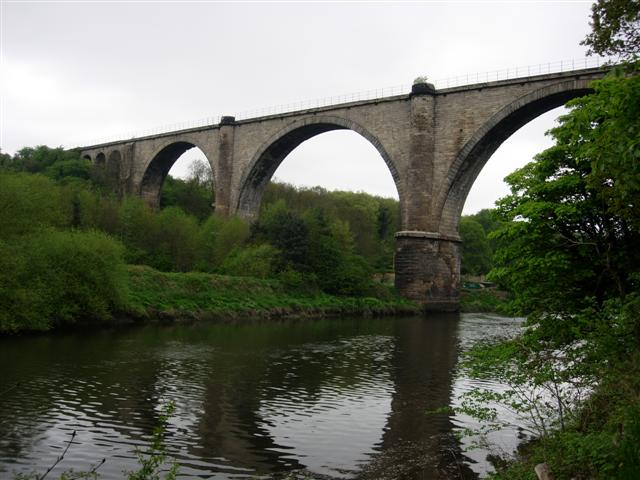
- Victoria Viaduct in 2006
- Coordinates: 54.8847°N 1.5028°W
- OS grid reference: NZ319546
- Carries: Leamside line
- Crosses: River Wear
- Locale: Wearside
- Other name: Victoria Bridge
- Owner: Network Rail
- Maintained by: Network Rail
- Heritage status: Grade II* listed
- Network Rail Bridge ID: MAC3 133(1)
- Preceded by: Penshaw Bridge
- Followed by: Cox Green Footbridge

Characteristics
- Material: Penshaw Sandstone; Aberdeen Granite
- Total length: 810 ft 9 in (247 m)
- Height: 120 ft (37 m)
- Longest span: 160 ft (49 m)
- No. of spans: 10

Rail characteristics
- No. of tracks: 2 (No longer in situ)
- Track gauge: 1,435 mm (4 ft 8 1/2 in)

History
- Designer: James Walker
- Constructed by: John Gibb & Son.
- Construction start: 17 March 1836
- Construction end: 28 June 1838
- Construction cost: £40,338
- Opened: August 1838
- Closed: 1991 (Mothballed)

Statistics

Listed Building – Grade II*
- Official name: Victoria Railway Bridge
- Designated: 15 June 1985
- Reference no.: 1354978

Location
- Interactive map of Victoria Viaduct

Victoria Viaduct, originally known as the Victoria Bridge, is a stone arch rail viaduct spanning the River Wear about 1 mile (1.6 km) south-east of Washington in the City of Sunderland North East England. It was built as part of the Durham Junction Railway under the supervision of Thomas Elliot Harrison.

== History and design ==
The bridge was constructed as part of the Durham Junction Railway, which had been sanctioned by act of parliament in 1834; the act allowed for traffic tolls on a bridge over the Wear, including tolls for road and foot crossing. A 170 ft (52 m) iron bridge suitable for passage by rail, foot and road vehicle was designed by John Green of Newcastle, but instead a stone arch bridge designed by James Walker was chosen. The contract to build the bridge was given to John Gibb & Son. of Aberdeen.

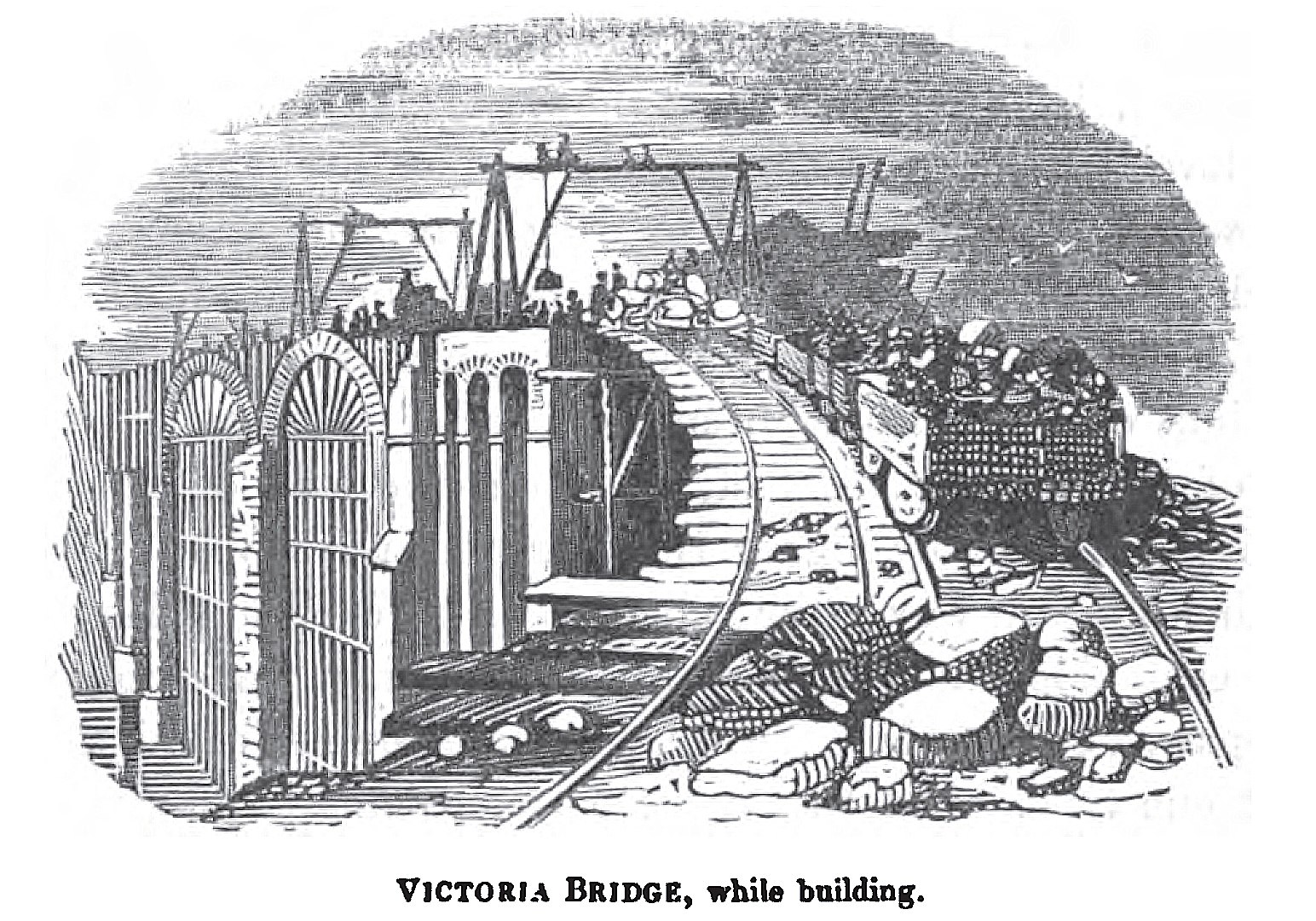
The Bridge under construction, woodcut from "The Local Historian's Table Book".

The design was based upon the Alcántara Bridge in Spain. Construction began 17 March 1836 and was completed on 28 June 1838, the date of the coronation of Queen Victoria; as a result it was called 'Victoria Bridge'. The cost of construction was £40,338 5s. 10d. (Note: In The Theory, Practice, and Architecture of Bridges of Stone, Iron, Timber.. the contracted cost is given as £34,619 and the actual cost as £38,000.(Weale et al. 1843, pp. cxxii))

The bridge is 810 ft 9 in (247.12 m) in length and 23 ft 4 in (7.11 m) in width, with a height above water level of the top point of the arches of approximately 120 ft (37 m) It was constructed entirely of locally quarried Penshaw sandstone, excluding the quoins stones of the main arches, made of aberdeen granite. The viaduct carried a double track railway, and had a walkway on either side for pedestrians.

The main arches had spans of 100 ft (30 m); 160 ft (49 m); 144 ft (44 m); and 100 ft (30 m). At either end of the viaduct were sets of three smaller spans of 20 ft (6.1 m). (Note: Walker's original design had full arches at either end, and a total length of 135ft – the design was modified to replace both of the end arches with three smaller arches. Walker was unhappy with this modification,(Tomlinson 1915, p. 319) and the architect Charles Barry was also critical of the change.) The main arches were semicircular with the exception of the main 160 ft span, which was a circular segment, spanning 160 ft with a rise of 72 ft. The three main piers and one of the arch abutments were founded on bedrock, the river pier required excavation to a depth of 24 ft (7.3 m) below the river bed to obtain that footing. One arch abutment was founded on 14 ft (4.3 m) long, 10 in (250 mm) diameter scotch fir piles, spaced at 3 ft (0.91 m). Above the first 5 ft (1.5 m) the piers contained voids to minimise mass. (Note: In Account of the Victoria Bridge, Erected Across the River Wear (Bremner 1843) an erroneous span width of 60ft is given for one of the main arches)

The bridge and line opened in August 1838. As built it was one of the largest bridges in Europe, being exceeded in arch length by the River Dee bridge at Chester, and in height by the Alcántara bridge, but not by other structures in both dimensions.

Scheduled passenger trains on the line and viaduct ceased in 1964 following the Beeching Axe. The bridge continued to carry freight, and was renovated in 1989/90. Diverted passenger trains also used it occasionally, especially while the East Coast Main Line was being electrified. After closure of the freight terminal at Follingsby in 1991 the line and bridge were mothballed. The structure was grade II* listed in 1985.

== Future ==
The proposed Tyne and Wear Metro Washington extension would use the viaduct.

== See also ==
- Leamside line

== Notes ==
Next bridge upstream	River Wear	Next bridge downstream
Penshaw Bridge	Victoria Viaduct; Grid reference NZ319546	Cox Green Footbridge
