= Thomas Sadleir =

Irish genealogist

- Born: Thomas Ulick Sadleir; 15 September 1882; Curragh Camp, County Kildare
- Died: 21 December 1957 (aged 75); Dublin
- Resting place: Castleknock church, Dublin
- Other name: Tom Sadleir
- Education: Trinity College Dublin
- Occupations: Barrister; Genealogist
- Spouse: Anna Elizabeth Norman (married 1922–)
- Children: Randal Sadleir; Digby Sadleir
- Parents: Franc Sadleir; Philippa Elizabeth Burke

Thomas Ulick Sadleir (15 September 1882 – 21 December 1957) was an Irish genealogist and heraldic expert. He was successively registrar of the Order of St Patrick, Deputy Ulster King of Arms and Acting Ulster King of Arms.

== Career ==
Sadleir's first involvement with the office of arms at Dublin Castle was when he worked on an unpaid basis whilst an undergraduate at Trinity College, Dublin. He graduated in 1904, and was called to the bar in 1906.

By 1913, he was working on a daily basis at the office, whilst practising as a barrister. In 1915 he was appointed registrar of the Order of St Patrick by George Dames Burtchaell, Deputy Ulster King of Arms. In practice, Sadleir carried out most of the day-to-day work of Ulster's office.

In 1915, Sadleir wrote an unofficial 6th volume of the annual Georgian Society Records called "Georgian mansions in Ireland" along with Page Dickinson. It proved to be the last volume of the society's annual records until it was re-established as the modern Irish Georgian Society in 1958.

In August 1921, Burtchaell was killed in a tram accident, and in September, Sadleir was appointed Deputy to Major Sir Neville Wilkinson, Ulster King of Arms. As Major Wilkinson was almost always absent from Dublin, Sadleir performed most of the duties of the office.

The Office of Arms was unaffected by the creation of the Irish Free State in December 1922, continuing to cover the whole of the island of Ireland, and remaining based in Dublin Castle.

In December 1940, Major Wilkinson died, and the Government of Ireland requested that no successor be appointed. For the next three years, Sadleir was Acting Ulster King of Arms. In 1943, the Government of Ireland established the Genealogical Office, which took over the records of the Office of Arms, while the title of Ulster King of Arms was merged with that of Norroy to become Norroy and Ulster King of Arms, a member of the College of Arms in London.

Sadleir continued to work for the Genealogical Office until 1944, clearing the large backlog of grants and confirmations of arms that had built up in Ulster's office. After leaving the G.O., he continued his private genealogical practice. He maintained links with his former employer, however, remaining a trustee of the Heraldic Museum in Dublin until his death.

Sadleir subsequently became a librarian at the King's Inns in Dublin, a post he held until his death.

On 29 August 1922, he married Anna Elizabeth Norman ("Norma"), daughter of Dr James and Anna Kenny of Killeshandra, County Cavan, with whom he had two sons, Randal and Digby.

Sadleir died at his home on Marlborough Road, Dublin on 21 December 1957, and was buried at Castleknock church, Dublin.

Thomas Ulick Sadleir's 9th Great Grandfather is Sir Ralph Sadleir of the Court of Henry VIII King of England

== Works ==
- Alumni Dublinenses: a register of the students, graduates, professors and provosts of Trinity College, in the University of Dublin, edited by George Dames Burtchaell and Thomas Ulick Sadleir (London: Williams and Norgate, three volumes, 1924)

== Arms ==
Coat of arms of Thomas Sadleir

Notes
Confirmed 3 July 1915 by George James Burtchaell, Deputy Ulster King of Arms.
Crest
A demi-lion rampant Azure crowned Or.
Torse
Of the colours.
Escutcheon
Quarterly 1st & 4th Or a lion rampant per fess Azure and Gules (Sadleir) 2nd per chevron Or and Gules two lions combatant in chief Sable (Lee) 3rd Gules three swords barways in pale Proper the point of the middle sword to the dexter between twelve estoiles Or a bordure engrailed Argent 4th paly of six Sable and Ermine on a canton Argent a lion rampant Azure.
Motto
Servire Deo Sapere

== See also ==
- Athlone Pursuivant

== Sources ==
- "Dickinson, Page Lawrence". Dictionary of Irish Architects 1720 - 1940. Irish Architectural Archive.
- Hood, Susan (2002). Royal Roots – Republican Inheritance: The Survival of the Office of Arms. Woodfield Press in association with the National Library of Ireland. OCLC 1245778782.
- Hood, Susan (October 2009). "Sadleir, Thomas Ulick ('Tom')". Dictionary of Irish Biography (online ed.). Royal Irish Academy. doi:10.3318/dib.007896.v1.
- Ireland. Genealogical Office (1914–1919). Grants and Confirmations of Arms. Vol. L: 1914–1919 (folio 13).
- Sadleir, Thomas Ulick; Dickinson, Page Lawrence (1915). Georgian Mansions in Ireland: With Some Account of the Evolution of Georgian Architecture and Decoration. Dublin: Printed for the authors at the Dublin University Press by Ponsonby & Gibbs. OCLC 1517589.
