= Joseph Foster (genealogist) =

British genealogist (1844–1905)

Joseph Foster (9 March 1844 – 29 July 1905) was an English antiquarian and genealogist whose transcriptions of records held by the Inns of Court and the University of Oxford remain important historical resources.

== Life and career ==
While his family was originally seated at Cold Hesledon and Hawthorn on the east coast of County Durham, Joseph Foster was born in Sunniside, Sunderland, the son of Joseph Foster and Elizabeth née Taylor. Educated in private schools in the neighbouring towns of North Shields, Sunderland, and Newcastle-on-Tyne, Foster developed an interest in genealogy at an early age, inheriting his genealogical faculty from his grandfather, Myles Birket Foster (1785-1861). He published his first genealogical work in 1862, entitled The Pedigree of the Fosters of Cold Hesledon in Co. Durham, at the age of 18. He was a nephew of the artist Myles Birket Foster.

Working initially as a printer in London, Foster continued to undertake genealogical research and became a prolific writer and publisher in the field. He undertook research into the histories of various families from the north of England, later publishing four volumes of Lancashire and Yorkshire pedigrees. He became friends with several Kings of Arms and Heralds of Arms during his lifetime, and the records of the College of Arms were often unreservedly placed at his service.

His major works, still used by historians, were transcriptions of the admission registers of the Inns of Court (published in 1885 as Men-at-the-Bar) and of the matriculation registers of the University of Oxford for the period 1500 to 1886 (published as Alumni Oxonienses). This latter work was marked by the award of an honorary MA degree by the university in 1892. It has been said of Foster that he was "no scholarly antiquary, but his energy as a transcriber and collector of genealogical and heraldic data has few parallels, and many of his publications remained classic resources, several of permanent value."

== Family ==
Foster married Catherine Clarke Pocock on 12 August 1869 at Burgess Hill, Sussex, and they had two sons and three daughters. His son, Sandys Birket Foster, initially continued his father's work and published several pedigrees in 1890 before qualifying as an accountant and emigrating to America where he died in 1938.

Joseph Foster died in London aged 61, at his home in St John's Wood, and was buried at Kensal Green cemetery.

== Works ==
Foster's publications include the following:

- Some Account of the Pedigree of the Forsters of Cold Hesledon, Co. Durham (1862)
- The King of Arms (1871)
- The Pedigree of Wilson of High Wray & Kendal, and the Families Connected With Them (1871)
- A Pedigree of the Forsters and Fosters of the North of England, and of some of the families connected with them (1871)
- The revised genealogical account of the various families descended from Francis Fox of St.Germans, Cornwall to which is appended a pedigree of the Croker's of Lineham and many other families connected with them (1872)
- Lancashire County Families (1873)
- Yorkshire County Families (3 volumes) (1874)
- The Pedigree of Dawes, of Shawe Place (1874)
- (editor) Visitations of Yorkshire by Robert Glover (1875)
- The Pedigree of Sir Josslyn Pennington (1878)
- (with Edward Bellasis) Peerage, Baronetage and Knightage (1879)
- The Lyon Office and the Marjoribanks family (1882)
- Members of Parliament, Scotland (1882)
- Men at the Bar (1885)
- London Marriage Licences (1521–1869) (1887)
- Alumni Oxonienses (1715–1886) (4 volumes) (1887)
- Concerning the Beginnings … of Heraldry as Related to untitled Persons (1887)
- The register of admissions to Gray's Inn (1557–1859), together with … marriages in Gray's Inn Chapel (1889)
- Index ecclesiasticus, or, Alphabetical lists of all ecclesiastical dignitaries in England and Wales since the Reformation (1890)
- The Pedigree of Birkbeck of Mallerstang and Settle, Braithwaite of Kendal, Benson of Stang End (1890)
- Alumni Oxonienses (1500–1714) (4 volumes) (1891)
- Pease of Darlington (1891)
- The Royal Lineage of our Noble and Gentle Families (1891)
- Oxford Men and their Colleges (1893)
- The Descendants of John Backhouse (1894)
- The Pedigree of Ashworth of Ashworth &c (1895)
- A Narrative of the Descendants of Richard Harris (1895)
- The Pedigree of Raikes, formerly of Kingston-upon-Hull (1897)
- Some Feudal Coats of Arms (1902)
- Two Tudor books of arms (1904)
