= Sean Mac Brádaigh =

Seán Mac Brádaigh (also known as Sean Brady) is a writer, podcaster and Sinn Féin activist. A former adviser and spokesman for the Sinn Féin Leader Gerry Adams, he was previously the party's Director of Publicity (2010–2014) and editor of the Sinn Féin newspaper, An Phoblacht (2005–2010). He has been a leading republican activist for many years.
