= Sunniside, Sunderland =

District of Sunderland, England

Coordinates: 54.90657°N 1.37808°W

Sculpture at Sunniside installed in 2008, a symbol of the area's growing regeneration

Sunniside is a district of Sunderland, North East England, towards the eastern side of the city centre, bounded to the west by Fawcett Street, to the south by Borough Road, and to the north and east by the Inner Ring road. A significant programme of urban development has established Sunniside as a centre of culture, film, dining, entertainment and art in the city. It is also known as the historic heart of Sunderland's legal and real estate sectors, with many solicitors and estate agencies based in the area.

== History ==
Sunniside grew up in the Victorian Era as the original business centre of Sunderland. At the height of Sunderland's power as a shipbuilding centre, most of the mercantile insurance and reinsurance companies and other associated business functions were based in Sunniside, as were a substantial number of foreign consulates, including the Netherlands, Denmark and Russia. Situated between West Sunniside and Norfolk Street is the old General Post Office building, now converted to residential use.

As the economic fortunes of Sunderland waned in the 1980s, however, many of the lucrative businesses left Sunniside and many others moved westward to new locations in the city centre and out of town, leaving the area to become plagued by urban decay. In the late 1990s, the Sunniside district was earmarked by the local council as a priority for urban renewal.

== Regeneration ==
In 2003, Sunderland's area regeneration company, Sunderland Arc released 15 year long proposals for Urban regeneration in the area, and they worked with the One Northeast regional redevelopment corporation and the city council to begin improvements on Sunniside with an investment.

The Place, Sunniside. A £6 million arts centre and anchor of local regeneration.

In 2007, the first redevelopment was completed; bringing the old Sunniside Gardens back to life with a complete makeover and a modern iconic sculpture to go along with it. and the following year after that new bars and cafes in the area were opened, along with the new £6 million development arts centre, "ThePlace".

=== Awards ===
The regeneration projects of Sunniside have won two national awards for their revival of that area of the city. In 2007, the area won an award from the Landscape Institute Awards and in 2008 Sunniside the North East Renaissance Award from the Royal Institution of Chartered Surveyors.

== Film-making ==
Sunniside is home to the film company Tanner Films Ltd. which was set up in 2008. The company's first film, a crime drama called "King of the North" starring Angus MacFadyen, is currently under production after it secured a £6 million deal from MonteCristo International at the Cannes film festival.

== Attractions ==
Because of the regeneration projects and other private investment, Sunniside now has a strong range of attractions:

- Sunniside Gardens
- ThePlace modern art centre
- Northern Gallery of Contemporary Art
