= Fiachra Mac Brádaigh =

Fiachra Mac Brádaigh (c. 1690–c. 1760) was an Irish poet and scribe,

Mac Brádaigh was a descendant of one of the leading families of Breifne. A Gaelic poet and one of the finest products of, and teachers in, the hedge schools before the introduction of formal education. He is buried in Dunsandle in County Galway, his adopted home.

His work has been described by Séamus P. Ó Mórdha:

"He composed an Aisling, a Seachrán and a Faoistin as was expected of an 18th century poet but he invested each of them with a something of the exuberance and liveliness of his own personality. Some of the Northern Aislingí that have come down to us could have been written by any one of half a dozen poets but not so Mac Brádaigh. He puts the stamp of his own locality and of his own individuality on his compositions."
