= Seán Mac Brádaigh =

Irish genealogist and historian (1932–2019)

Seán Mac Brádaigh (1932 – 2019) was an Irish genealogist and historian.

== Biography ==
The eldest of eight children, Mac Brádaigh is a native of Sandymount, Dublin.

He served as a Sergeant in the Irish Defence Forces and as a Sergeant in An Garda Siochana. Mac Brádaigh joined the Irish Army in 1952 and served as Sergeant Instructor in the Cadet School, Military College at the Curragh, often instructing through the medium of Irish. He joined An Garda Siochana in 1958 serving in Sundrive, Terenure, Irishtown and Blackrock. He also served as Instructor at the Garda College in Templemore.

Upon retirement he entered University College, Dublin, graduating in 1993 with an Honours Degree in History. Mac Brádaigh was also an heraldic artist, published poet, oral historian and expert on ancient Irish manuscripts and Irish Clans.

== Publication ==
Since the early 1960s he has published academic articles on Irish genealogy and family history in historical and genealogical journals such as the Arklow Historical Society, Dublin Historical Record, Cumann Seanchais Bhreifne, and Genealogical Society of Ireland.

His book "The Bradys of Cavan" is a history of the people called Brady or Mac Brádaigh whose origins lie in that part of Breifne now called County Cavan. It is designed to tell their modern descendants about their ancient ancestors' position and status over the years with special attention to those who were chiefs, poets, bishops, and/or otherwise distinguished from the ordinary. Heraldry became important after the Flight of the Wild Geese and senior members of the Brady family endeavoured to take their place among the nobility of Europe and the story of these arms as relate to Brady is recounted in the book.

== Personal life ==
He married Maura in 1960 and has four daughters and one son. MacBrádaigh is not associated with any political party.

== Select bibliography ==
=== Articles ===
All articles published in the Journal of the Genealogical Society of Ireland, unless otherwise stated.

- An Ulster Migration to Arklow 1597, vol. 3, no. 1, 2002.
- My Cavan Connections, vol.3, no. 2, 2002.
- Occupants of the Village of Deansgrange, Co. Dublin, 1846-95, vol. 3, no. 2, 2002.
- Padraig MacPiarais agus Tochailt an Phoir, vol. 3, no. 2, 2002.
- Noda, the Scribally Contracted Forms Used in Irish Manuscripts, vol. 3, no. 4, 2002.
- Occupants of the Village of Kill Of The Grange, Co. Dublin, 1846-95, vol. 3, no. 3, 2002.
- The Gaelic Genealogies of the Irish, vol. 3, no. 4, 2002.
- James Terry's Legacy, pp. 22–25, vol. 5, no. 1, Spring 2004.
- The Genealogy of MacGovern, 2003, Vol. 4, No. 2, Page 122.
- The genealogy of MagShamhradháin, in Breifne Journal 2010, Vol.XII, No.45, pp. 150–153.
- The Genealogies in the Irish Manuscripts, pp. 33–39, Féil-Scríbhinn Liam Mhic Alasdair:Essays Presented to Liam Mac Alasdair, FGSI, ed. Rory J. Stanley, Genealogical Society of Ireland, December 2009.

=== Books ===
- The Bradys of Cavan in history and genealogy, Irish Genealogical Sources No. 29, 2002, ISBN 1-898471-12-6.

"The Bradys of Cavan" 2nd Edition Revised and Enlarged, Cards, pp. 330. Dublin 2013.
