= Northern Spire Bridge =

Bridge in Sunderland, England

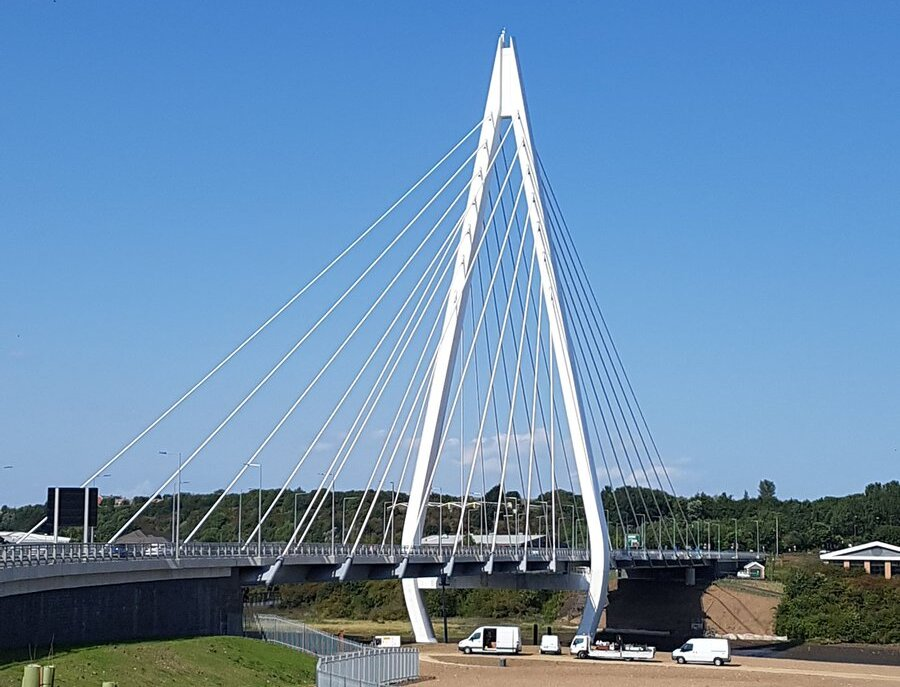
- The Bridge shortly after opening.
- Coordinates: 54°55′00″N 1°25′28″W
- OS grid reference: NZ369581
- Owner: Sunderland City Council
- Website: sunderland.gov.uk/article/14608/Northern-Spire
- Next upstream: Hylton Viaduct
- Next downstream: Queen Alexandra Bridge

Characteristics
- Design: Cable-stayed bridge
- Piers in water: 1
- No. of lanes: 4

History
- Construction start: May 2015
- Construction end: 2018

Location
- Interactive map of Northern Spire Bridge

The Northern Spire Bridge is a bridge over the River Wear in Sunderland, Tyne and Wear, England. The crossing opened to pedestrians on 28 August 2018, before opening to traffic the next day. A two span cable-stayed structure, construction began in May 2015, overseen by Farrans Construction and Victor Buyck Steel Construction.

A crossing had been proposed as early as 2005, however financial uncertainties caused significant delay until funding was approved by HM Treasury. Originally an ambitious design was selected, but was later dropped after several contractors withdrew. In 2014, the project switched to a cheaper cable-stayed design.

== Specifications ==
The bridge has been constructed to the west side of the city over the River Wear, with the purpose of reducing traffic congestion. It was designed by Spence Associates in partnership with structural engineering firm Techniker. The bridge was first designed in 2005, but it was kept confidential for several years by the City Council to avoid a rise in expectations until funding was secured. The council was also considering plans for a cheaper, basic beam bridge design. The cost of the Spence design was estimated at £133 million for the bridge and the associated approaches and roadworks.

The crossing forms part of the regeneration plan produced by Sunderland Arc, whose aim was to use the bridge as part of a Sunderland Strategic Transport Corridor to improve transport links and to improve the city's image. In 2017, following a public consultation and vote, the crossing was named the Northern Spire Bridge out of three shortlisted names.

== Background and history ==
In 2003, the urban regeneration company, Sunderland Arc commissioned the engineering firm Arup to assist with finding a suitable location for the siting of a new road bridge over the River Wear. In 2004, the Canadian-American Architect Frank Gehry undertook a study for this new river crossing. An international design competition was organised by Sunderland Arc in 2005. Several submissions were made, including one by Frank Gehry, but it was the cable-stayed design of Spence Associated that won.

In 2008, Sunderland City Council held a public consultation on the designs to see if the public would prefer the Spence design to a more basic beam bridge. The consultation showed that people in the Sunderland area were in favour of the Spence design. The council decided to back the Spence design and abandon the cheaper beam bridge option. They justified their decision on the grounds that the more ambitious design would attract more businesses to the city and thus create more jobs. The United Kingdom government then announced a contribution of £93 million towards construction and the regional development agency One NorthEast pledged another £8.5 million, with the council funding the remaining £23 million required.

The decision to build the Spence design became official Sunderland City Council policy on 9 September 2009. In November 2009, public notices on the compulsory purchase of land and new rights for the project were published including side roads orders and bridge schemes notices, made under the Highways Act 1980. An official planning application was placed with Sunderland City Council on 7 December 2009 with a consultation expiry date of 29 October 2010. Construction was timetabled to start around 2012.

On 26 May 2010, Sunderland City Council approved the planning application and the project appeared ready to go ahead. However, by July 2013 construction still had not begun, due to difficulty in producing the design at the approved funding level; several contractors withdrew from the project. This led to a reassessment of the design, which dropped the Spence plan in favour of a simpler cable-stayed design.

Roughan & O’Donovan and BuroHappold Engineering delivered the preliminary and detailed design of the bridge with Yee Associates as architectural consultants.

Between 10 and 11 February 2017, the central A-frame pylon (fabricated in Ghent, Belgium by Victor Buyck Steel Construction) was installed which stands at a height of 105 m (344 ft), making it the tallest structure in Sunderland.

The raising of the single bridge pylon marked the culmination of two years of design and planning, as well as twelve months of fabricating.

== Gallery ==
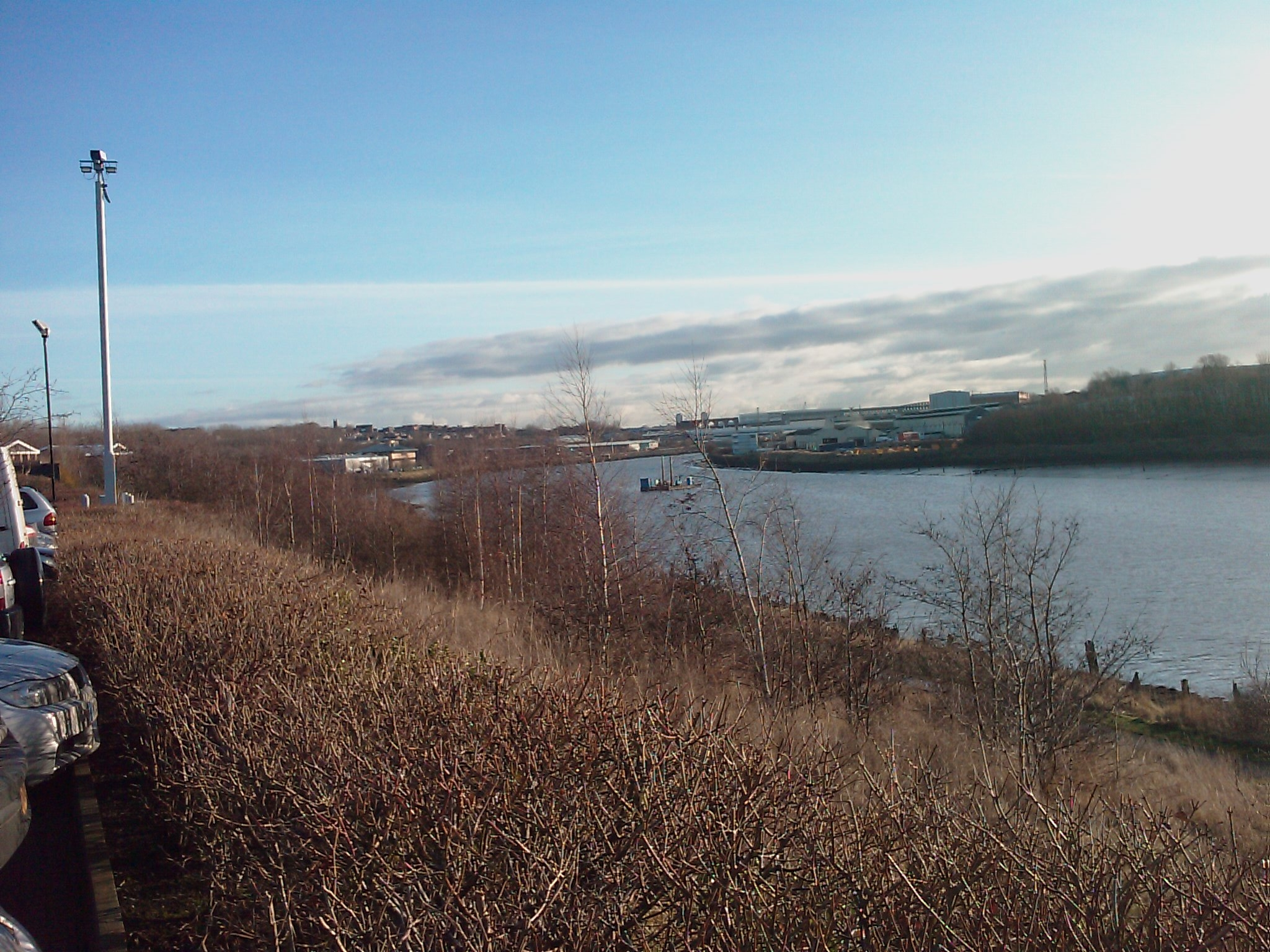
The site of the Northern Spire in 2010

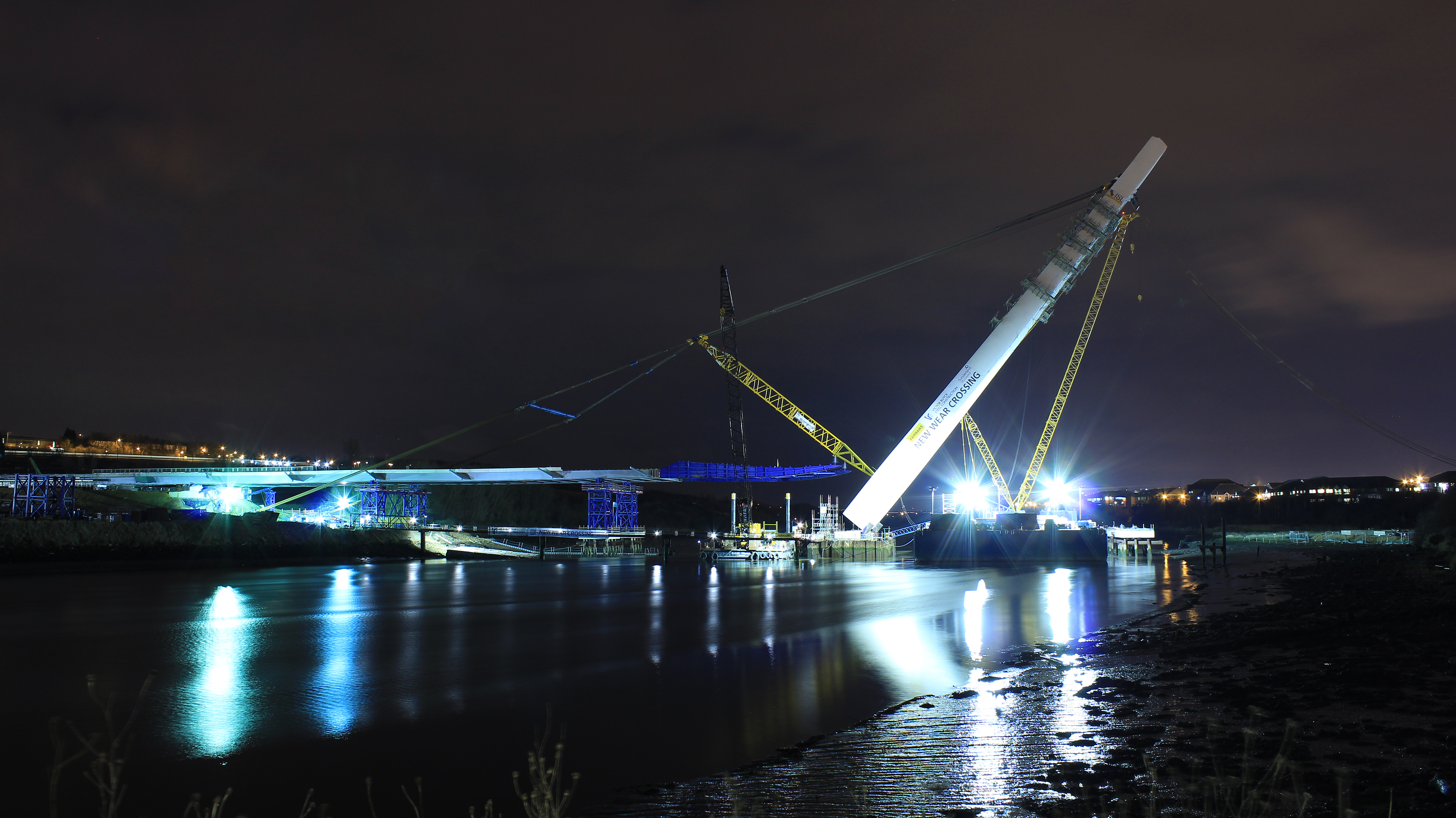
The spire being raised in 2017

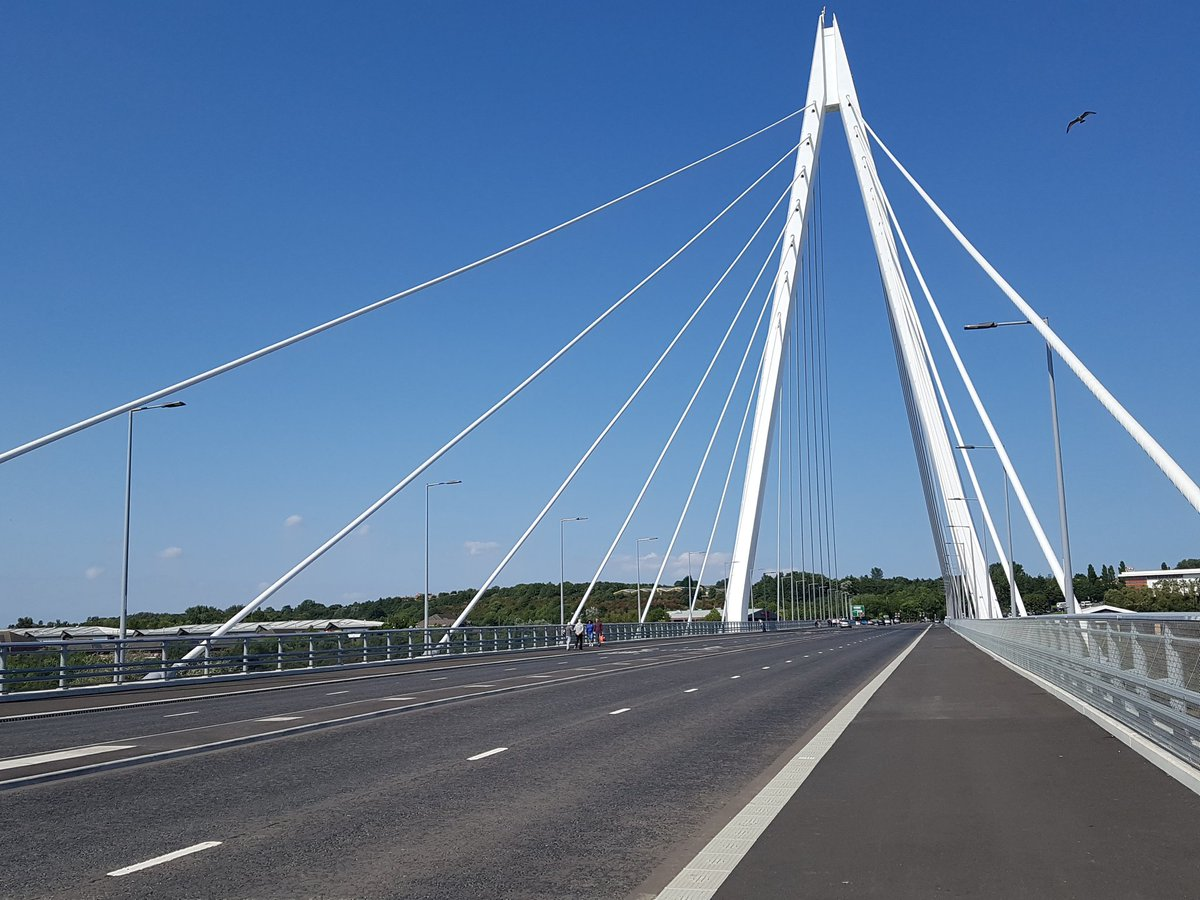
Walking across the bridge

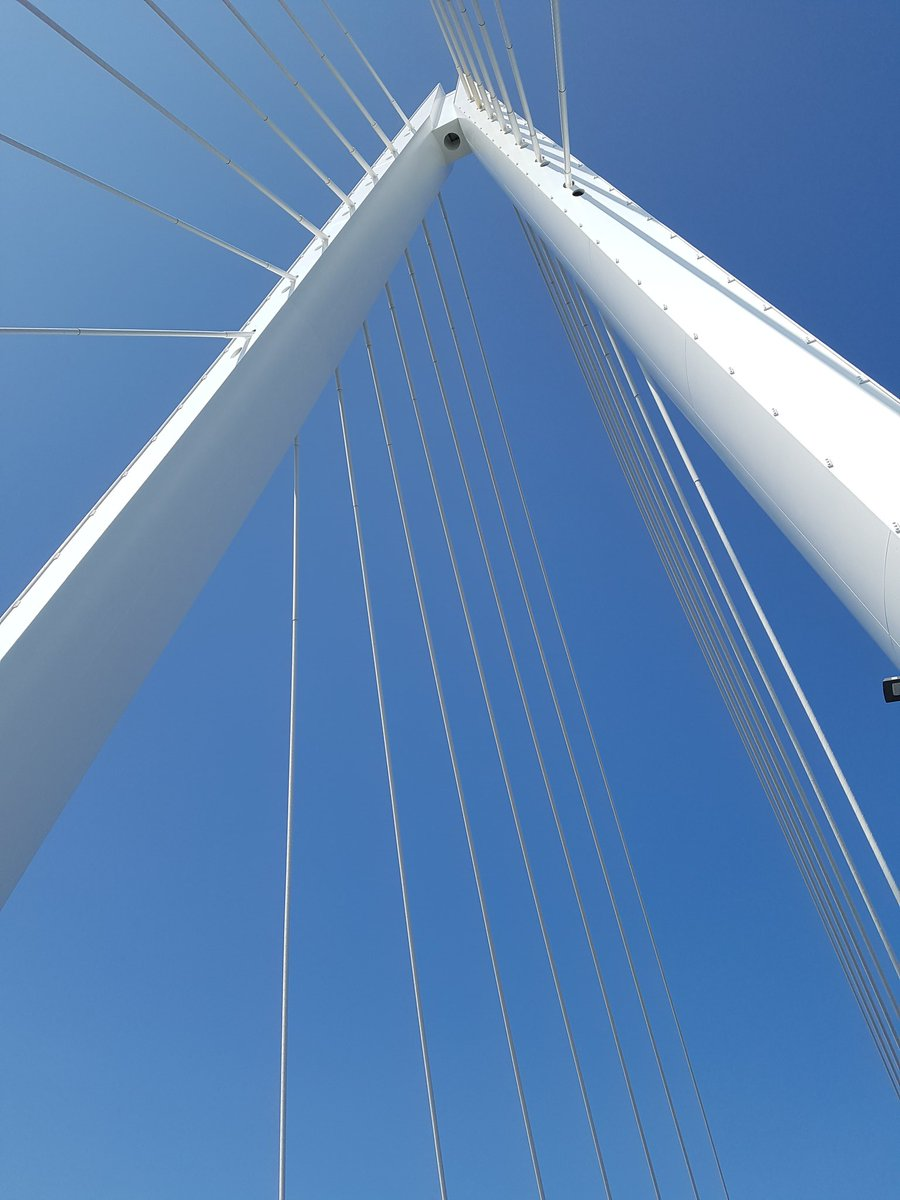
Looking up towards the spire

| Next bridge upstream | River Wear | Next bridge downstream |
| Hylton Viaduct; A19 | Northern Spire Bridge; Grid reference NZ369581 | Queen Alexandra Bridge; B1539 |
