= Genealogical Society of Ireland =

Genealogical and Vexillological organisation

- Cumann Geinealais na hÉireann
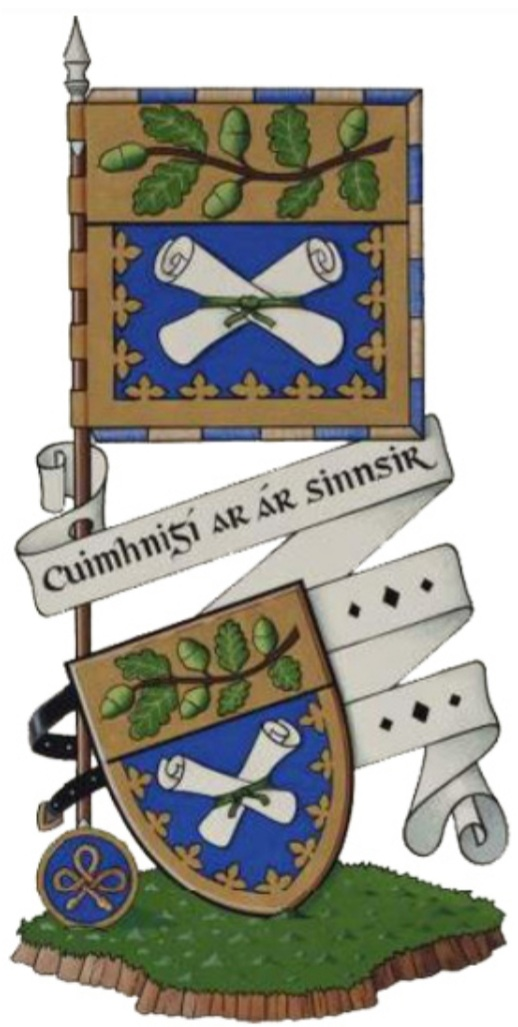
- Coat of Arms of the Genealogical Society of Ireland
- Formation: 1990
- Type: NPO
- Legal status: Charity
- Purpose: Genealogy; Vexillology
- Headquarters: An Daonchartlann, Archive & Research Centre, DLR Leisure Centre, Loughlinstown, County Dublin.
- Location: Dublin, Ireland
- Region served: Ireland
- Official language: English, Irish
- Cathaoirleach (Chairperson): Gerry Hayden, MGSI
- Main organ: Board of Directors
- Website: www.familyhistory.ie

The Genealogical Society of Ireland (Irish: Cumann Geinealais na hÉireann) is a voluntary non-governmental organisation promoting the study of genealogy, heraldry, vexillology and social history in Ireland and amongst the Irish diaspora as open access educational leisure pursuits available to all.

== Founding, governance and purpose ==
Founded in 1990, the society has charitable status in Ireland and it is incorporated under the Companies Acts. Membership of the society is open to all and therefore, the society has both a national and international membership. The society is also a nominating body for the Cultural and Educational Panel for Seanad Éireann.

The society is governed by a board of directors which is elected annually at the annual general meeting held in March of each year. The current cathaoirleach (chairperson) is Gerry Hayden, who was elected in March 2018. The society received a grant of arms from the Chief Herald of Ireland in 2001. The activities of the society include two open meetings each month; the publication of a monthly newsletter, biannual journal and other occasional publications; the operation of an archive at the DLR Leisure Centre, Loughlinstown, County Dublin. The premises were allocated to the society by the Dún Laoghaire-Rathdown County Council in May 2016.

The society does not engage in any commercial research assignments; however, its members undertake individual research.

== Political influence ==
In May 2006, the Genealogy and Heraldry Bill, 2006, was introduced in Seanad Éireann (Irish Senate) by Senator Brendan Ryan. This bill was researched, written and promoted by the society, its officers, and members.

== Affiliations ==
Flag of Vexillology Ireland

The Genealogical Society of Ireland, through its branch Vexillology Ireland, became a member of the International Federation of Vexillological Associations (also known as FIAV) at the 25th International Congress of Vexillology in Rotterdam, the Netherlands, in 2013.
