= Alumni Cantabrigienses =

Cambridge University biographical dictionary

Alumni Cantabrigienses: A Biographical List of All Known Students, Graduates and Holders of Office at the University of Cambridge, from the Earliest Times to 1900 is a biographical register of former members of the University of Cambridge which was edited by the mathematician John Venn (1834–1923) and his son John Archibald Venn (1883–1958) and published by Cambridge University Press in ten volumes between 1922 and 1953. Over 130,000 individuals are covered, with more extended biographical detail provided for post-1751 matriculants.

== Publication history ==
John Venn, a fellow and later president of Caius College, Cambridge, began this huge project after completing a biographical register of members of his own college. Part I of Alumni Cantabrigienses, in four volumes, covered those who matriculated at Cambridge up to 1751. Although publication was delayed by World War I, Venn lived to see the first two volumes of Part I published before his death in 1923. They were a collaboration between Venn and his son, J. A. Venn, fellow and (from 1932) president of Queens' College, Cambridge: Alumni Cantabrigienses was continued by J. A. Venn as "the work which occupied him for most of his life". With support from the syndics of Cambridge University Press, the younger Venn saw the two remaining volumes of Part I through the press, and (from 1940 to 1954) six volumes comprising Part II, covering 1752–1900 matriculations.

Beyond details of an individual's progression at the University of Cambridge, the information provided in Alumni Cantabrigienses may include: dates and place of birth and death; the names of parents, siblings and spouses; schooling, occupation, and notable accomplishments; and references to sources cited. The Venns compiled Alumni Cantabrigienses from university records (matriculation registers and degree lists), written sources, and archives which included college admission registers, episcopal registers, college accounts, genealogical collections and documents in public record offices. For pre-1500 matriculations, their work has been superseded by that of A. B. Emden, but "the bulk of the work [...] has not been paralleled, let alone surpassed", and Alumni Cantabrigienses has twice been reprinted in facsimile.

== Derived works ==
An ongoing project at the University of Cambridge is integrating Alumni Cantabrigienses with Emden's material, registers of women's colleges (members of Girton and Newnham colleges were not given full university membership until 1947) and other sources, amounting to over 20,000 cards of addenda and corrigenda. The results are available online as a searchable database.

== Volumes ==
=== Part I. From the earliest times to 1751 ===
- Vol. i. Abbas – Cutts, 1922. Online version at the Internet Archive.
- Vol. ii. Dabbs – Juxton, 1922. Online version at the Internet Archive. And another and another
- Vol. iii. Kaile – Ryves, 1924. Online version at the Internet Archive
- Vol. iv. Saal – Zuinglius, 1927. Online version at the Internet Archive

=== Part II. 1752–1900 ===
- Vol. i. Abbey – Challis, 1940. Online version at the Internet Archive
- Vol. ii. Chalmers – Fytche, 1944. Online version at the Internet Archive
- Vol. iii. Gabb – Justamond, 1947. Online version at the Internet Archive
- Vol. iv. Kahlenberg – Oyler, 1947. Online version at the Internet Archive
- Vol. v. Pace – Spyers, 1953. Online version at the Internet Archive
- Vol. vi. Square – Zupitza, 1954. Online version at the Internet Archive

== See also ==
- Alumni Oxonienses
- Alumni Dublinenses
- Template:Acad
