= Alumni Oxonienses =

Oxford University biographical dictionary

Alumni Oxonienses: The Members of the University of Oxford is a biographical reference work by Joseph Foster (1844–1905), published by Oxford University Press, listing the alumni of the University of Oxford from 1500 to 1886. Foster's work was compiled principally from the colleges' matriculation registers and the university archives, but it also relies on numerous printed and other sources.

The supplement is called Oxford Men and their Colleges.

== Publications ==
- Alumni Oxonienses (1500–1714) (four volumes, 1891–92):
  - Online version at british-history.ac.uk
  - Wikisource transcriptions
  - Online volumes at Hathitrust
- Alumni Oxonienses (1715–1886) (four volumes 1887-1888, reissued in four volumes, 1891–92):
  - Surnames beginning A-D online version
  - Surnames beginning E-K online version
  - Surnames beginning L-R online version
  - Surnames beginning S-Z online version
- Oxford Men and their Colleges (1880–1892) (two volumes, 1893): online version

== See also ==
- Alumni Cantabrigienses
- Alumni Dublinenses
