= Sunderland 'Til I Die =

2018 British sports documentary series

- Genre: Fly on the wall documentary
- Theme music composer: Marty Longstaff
- Opening theme: "Shipyards" by The Lake Poets
- Country of origin: United Kingdom
- Original language: English
- No. of seasons: 3
- No. of episodes: 17

Production
- Executive producers: Leo Pearlman; Ben Turner
- Running time: 37–42 mins
- Production company: Fulwell 73

Original release
- Network: Netflix
- Release: 14 December 2018 – 13 February 2024

Sunderland 'Til I Die is a sports documentary series. Produced by Fulwell 73 (named as a homage to Sunderland A.F.C. by its founders), the series documents the events around English football club Sunderland A.F.C.

Released on 14 December 2018, the first series documents Sunderland's 2017–18 season which saw the club playing in the EFL Championship having been relegated from the Premier League the season prior. As a result of the first series success a second series was produced documenting the following season in 2018–19, which coincided with the club's first season under the ownership of Stewart Donald; this was released on 1 April 2020. A third and final series charting the 2021-22 season was released on 13 February 2024, which documented the club's promotion to the EFL Championship in 2022.

Overall the show has received positive reviews from critics and fans.

== Background ==
Sunderland chairman Ellis Short originally agreed to extensive, behind-the-scenes filming in the summer of 2017 on the basis it would attract potential investors. Sunderland had already been the focus of previous fly on the wall documentaries, including the 1998 Premier Passions (which also documented a relegation season) and its 1999 follow-up Premier Pressures.

Production company Fulwell 73 (who had previously produced the acclaimed football documentary The Class of '92) had allegedly expressed interest in buying Sunderland in June 2017 shortly before the commencement of filming, but withdrew, citing the demands of their production business. Promoting Sunderland 'til I Die on The Totally Football League Show in December 2018, Pearlman and Turner cast doubt on the veracity of these reports, suggesting there had been: "a lot of two plus two equals five going on". Speaking on the Roker Report podcast prior to the release of the series, Pearlman and Turner, both Sunderland fans, revealed that they had been trying to produce material for the club for a while and had even offered to produce an end-of-season DVD for free.

Filming commenced in June 2017 with the expectation that Sunderland would be challenging for promotion back to the Premier League. Manager Chris Coleman admitted to being uncomfortable with the filming arrangements, which were already in place when he replaced Simon Grayson as manager part way through the season. Coleman described the constant attention as being 'unnatural'. The series does not include a repeat of the memorable, expletive-laden dressing room scenes from Premier Passions, as Coleman explained: "The only thing I really dug my heels in about was that I didn't want any filming in my dressing room. That's been kept separate."

The first season culminates with the takeover of the club by Stewart Donald following relegation.

A premiere of the first episode took place at the Sunderland Empire Theatre on 5 December 2018. The production company were joined by local media, Sunderland players and staff, and a group of 200 season ticket holders who had been selected from a draw. After the premiere, attendees were shown a trailer for a second season.

The opening titles were created by Alchemy Studio and feature icons from Sunderland's industrial past, with the song "Shipyards" by the Sunderland-based band The Lake Poets.

Filming continued during 2018–19, with a view to producing a second season. Speaking to BBC Sport in February 2019, Turner said that they had received greater access since the change of ownership.

Regarding the possibility of a third series, co-producer Leo Pearlman had stated that there were no plans currently in place for one and filming didn't take place during the 2019–20 season.

Following the club's victory in the 2022 EFL League One play-off final, Pearlman announced a third and final series documenting Sunderland's 2022 League One play-offs. The third series comprising three episodes was released on 13 February 2024.

== Episodes ==
Series	Episodes	Originally released
1	8	14 December 2018
2	6	1 April 2020
3	3	13 February 2024

=== Season 1 (2018) ===
No. overall	No. in series	Title	Featured matches	Original release date
1	1	"Blinded by the Light"	Sunderland 0–5 Celtic	14 December 2018
Sunderland begin a new season in the second tier of English football following a disappointing relegation.
2	2	"We Can't Walk Away"	Sunderland 1–1 Derby County / Norwich City 1–3 Sunderland / Bury 0–1 Sunderland / Carlisle United 1–2 Sunderland / Sheffield Wednesday 1–1 Sunderland / Sunderland 0–2 Leeds United / Barnsley 3–0 Sunderland	14 December 2018
After a promising start to the season, the lack of squad depth is exposed. With money short, the team scrambles for help in the transfer market.
3	3	"Plastic Shoes"	Sunderland 1–2 Sheffield United / Sunderland 0–1 Nottingham Forest / Ipswich Town 5–2 Sunderland / Brentford 3–3 Sunderland / Sunderland 3–3 Bolton	14 December 2018
Frustration mounts among the players and fans as the team falls into the relegation zone, leaving manager Simon Grayson in a precarious position.
4	4	"Rocking and Rolling"	Middlesbrough 1–0 Sunderland / Sunderland 2–2 Millwall / Burton Albion 0–2 Sunderland / Sunderland 1–0 Fulham	14 December 2018
A major shakeup brings renewed hope to the Stadium of Light, but as Christmas approaches, the team still seeks its first home win of the year.
5	5	"Sticking Plasters"	Sunderland 0–1 Barnsley / Birmingham City 3–1 Sunderland	14 December 2018
The Winter Transfer Window proves difficult when ownership refuses to put money in the club and a rarely used player collects on a massive contract.
6	6	"No Guarantees"	Bristol City 3–3 Sunderland / Sunderland 0–2 Brentford / Bolton 1–0 Sunderland / Sunderland 3–3 Middlesbrough	14 December 2018
Injuries mount as the team struggles to move clear of the relegation zone, but a key player's return to the lineup could provide a spark.
7	7	"Changing the Landscape"	Millwall 1–1 Sunderland / Sunderland 0–3 Aston Villa / Derby County 1–4 Sunderland / Sunderland 1–2 Burton Albion	14 December 2018
Desperation kicks in as the season winds down. A familiar face returns in opposing colours, while a current player makes an unfortunate mistake.
8	8	"A Fresh Start"	Sunderland 3–0 Wolves	14 December 2018
With organisational upheaval on the horizon, coaches, players and staff consider their futures as fans pledge to stand behind "the lads" forever.

=== Season 2 (2020) ===
No. overall	No. in series	Title	Featured matches	Original release date
9	1	"A Role in the Renaissance"	Sunderland 2–1 Charlton Athletic	1 April 2020
New owner Stewart Donald and director Charlie Methven begin the arduous task of bringing the club out of financial ruin while succeeding on the field.
10	2	"The Old-Fashioned Way"	TBA	1 April 2020
Stewart's frustrations with agents mount during the club's contract negotiations with key players, including young goal-scoring leader Josh Maja.
11	3	"Pride, Passion and Loyalty"	Port Vale 1–2 Sunderland / Sunderland 1–1 Wycombe Wanderers / Sunderland 4–2 Barnsley / Sunderland 2–1 Bristol Rovers / Sunderland 1–0 Bradford City	1 April 2020
Amid concerns about the front office culture, Charlie puts an aggressive marketing plan in place to draw the largest crowd in third division history.
12	4	"Playing Poker"	Sunderland 1–1 Luton Town / Sunderland 1–0 AFC Wimbledon / Oxford United 1–1 Sunderland / Sunderland 1–1 Blackpool / Sunderland 4–2 Gillingham	1 April 2020
In need of a striker to bolster the club's promotion bid, Stewart races against time to sign a key player by the January transfer deadline.
13	5	"The Time for Men"	Sunderland 4-0 Newcastle United U21s / Bristol Rovers 0-2 Sunderland / Sunderland 2-2 Portsmouth (4-5 pens)	1 April 2020
The team's run to a trophy final at Wembley Stadium brings pride and excitement to the long-suffering fans, who travel in huge numbers to London.
14	6	"Football Is Life"	Sunderland 4-5 Coventry City / Sunderland 1-1 Portsmouth / Fleetwood Town 2-1 Sunderland / Sunderland 1-0 Portsmouth (playoff semi final 1) / Portsmouth 0-0 Sunderland (playoff semi final 2) / Sunderland 1-2 Charlton Athletic	1 April 2020
A singular focus on promotion consumes the players, management and fans, who don't want to endure another season in League One.

=== Season 3 (2024) ===
No. overall	No. in series	Title	Featured matches	Original release date
15	1	"Something to Throw Your Hope Into"	TBA	13 February 2024
16	2	"Heck of a League to Get Out Of"	TBA	13 February 2024
17	3	"Til the Very End"	TBA	13 February 2024

== Critical reception ==
The critical response to the series has been generally positive.

Reviewing the series for Sports Illustrated, Luis Miguel Echegaray compared it to All or Nothing: Manchester City and wrote: "The project perfectly encapsulates the cultural significance of the city's relationship with its proud, working-class supporters. As a result, Sunderland 'Til I Die, despite the club's plight, is a cut above the rest." Writing for The Independent, Alex Hess again drew comparisons to All or Nothing, suggesting that, unlike the "weirdly bland affair" which followed Manchester City's unrelenting success, the dismal failure of Sunderland's season made for "triumphant TV".

The Newcastle-based Evening Chronicle gave the series a positive five-star review describing it as "so much more than just a tale of woe" and praising the show's focus on the fans. Writing for The Guardian, Barry Glendenning described it as a "wonderful series" which: "simultaneously showcases everything that is right and wrong with English football." Jack Fox in the Metro states "at times it's more gory than Game of Thrones but it is a series well worth binging on." The Daily Telegraph gave it four out of five stars, and described it as an "uplifting story", while The Wall Street Journal described it as "superb".

Writing a review for the Sunderland Echo (the local newspaper for the Sunderland area), Phil Smith expressed disappointment at the lack of anything revelatory or explosive in the series, and considered the setup of Sunderland as an area of post-industrial poverty a little forced in the opening episodes. Nevertheless, he described it as "a beautiful and fundamentally true piece of work".

Writing for Decider, Scott Hines compared the first season of Sunderland 'Til I Die to the likes of Gimme Shelter or 9/11 as a case in which "you start making a movie about one thing, and something entirely different happens". He also wrote that the story of the first season – a team hoping to return to the top flight that instead finds itself moving further away from it after piling up losses on the pitch – is "deeply relatable if you've ever worked hard for a company that's failed over your head, if you've ever tried to help someone who can't help themself, if you've ever kept hope in the face of overwhelming evidence to the contrary."

The third season was described by Richard Jolly of The Independent as "giving viewers a happy ending as the long-suffering stars of the show, the Sunderland fans, remain at its emotional heart".

== Legacy ==
Writer Humphrey Ker credits the series to the initial motivation for Rob McElhenney's interest in purchasing Wrexham A.F.C.; the purchase was documented in the documentary series Welcome to Wrexham, which itself was compared to Sunderland 'Til I Die.

== See also ==
- Sunderland A.F.C. supporters
