= Beacon of Light =

Sports, community and education facility, in Sunderland, Tyne & Wear

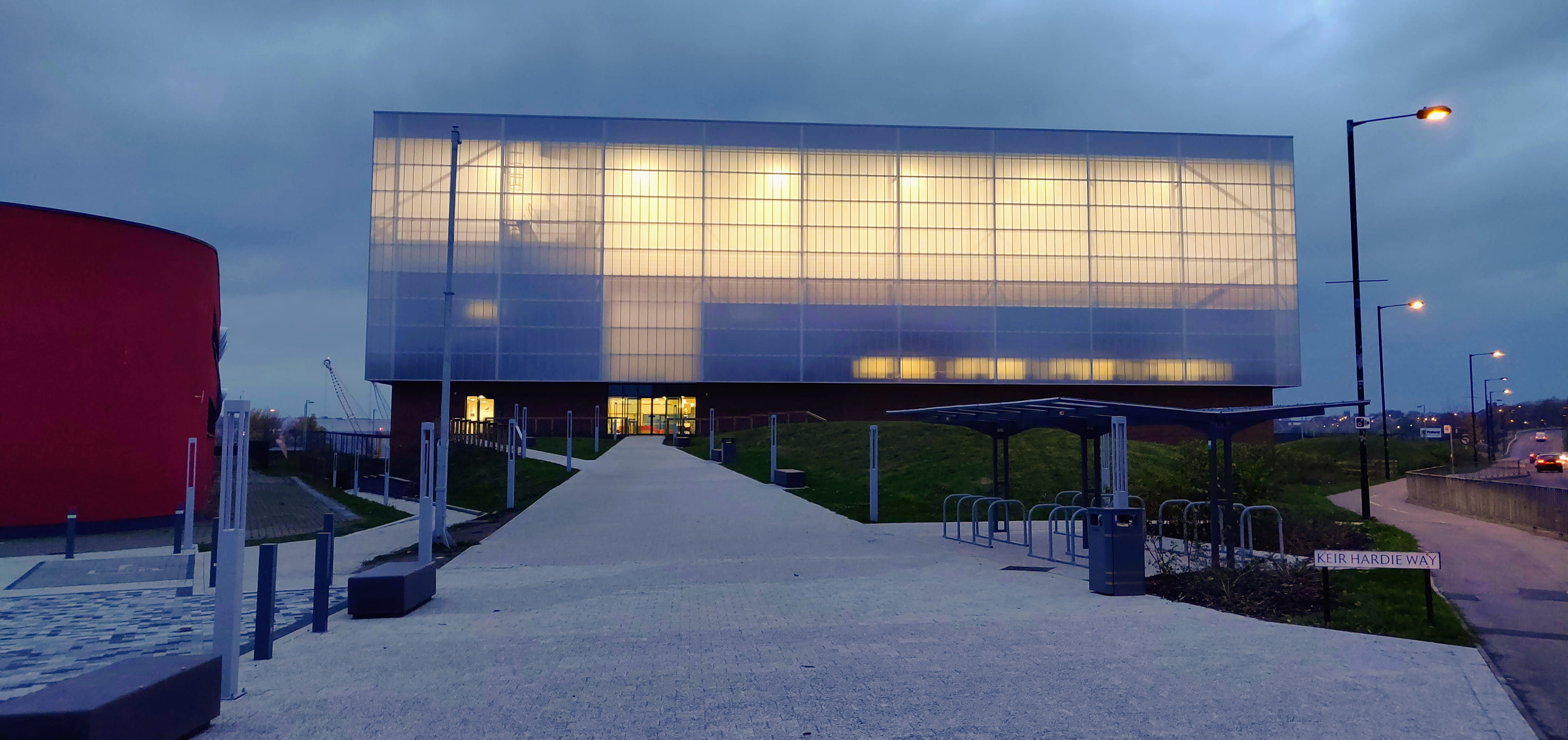

- Location within Tyne and Wear

General information
- Status: Completed
- Type: Sports & Education Centre
- Location: Stadium Park, Sunderland, United Kingdom
- Coordinates: 54°54′58.68″N 1°23′25.44″W
- Construction started: 5 October 2016
- Completed: May 2018
- Opened: 14 September 2018
- Cost: £19 million GBP
- Owner: Foundation of Light

Height
- Roof: 26 metres (85 ft)

Technical details
- Floor count: 6
- Floor area: 11,140 m^{2} (119,900 sq ft)
- Lifts/elevators: 2

Design and construction
- Architect: FaulknerBrowns
- Structural engineer: s h e d
- Main contractor: Tolent Construction

The Beacon of Light is a sports, community and education facility, in Sunderland. The £19m facility was commissioned by the Foundation of Light, and became the headquarters of the charity when it opened in September 2018. The beacon is in Stadium Park, alongside the Sunderland Aquatic Centre and the North Stand of the Stadium of Light.

== History ==
The Foundation of Light opened an education facility, The Centre of Light, within the Stadium of Light in 2004. The classrooms were a huge success, so much so that the Foundation outgrew them. This prompted Foundation chief executive Lesley Spuhler to look to commission a bigger venue.

The Beacon was given approval to begin construction in October 2015, and received financial support from the Tom Cowie Foundation, and Foundation of Light trustees Peter Vardy and Bob Murray. Further investors included the North East Local Enterprise Partnership, Arriva, and Tombola.

The Beacon was designed to provide both indoor and outdoor sporting facilities and spaces for both adult and school-level education. It can also support events and exhibitions, with a 2,084 Square metre exhibition space supporting a maximum capacity of 3,425. It is expected to serve up to 300,000 people per year.

Construction was complete in May 2018. The Beacon was opened in phases, with people able to use the football facilities from June 2018. It officially opened on 14 September 2018.

== Facilities ==
=== Outdoor ===
- 6 outdoor Five-a-side football pitches with 3G turf
- Outdoor sports courts

=== Indoor ===
Level 0	12 Badminton courts; 3 indoor courts for netball, Basketball and futsal
Level 1	Entrance & Cafe; Sir Tom Cowie Education Zone; The Vardy Heath and Wellbeing Zone, which will incorporate a Jamie Oliver cookery school
Level 2	Foundation of Light Work Space; Arriva 'World of Work' Zone
Level 3	Beacon of Light School, a Free school with a capacity of 80 children.
Level 4	Tombola Football Barn, including a 7-a-side football 4G pitch and the venue for Saturday FC.
Level 5	Rooftop viewing gallery

The Beacon is designed in a cube shape with a luminous roof which lights up at night.
