= Sunderland A.F.C. supporters =

Football club supporters

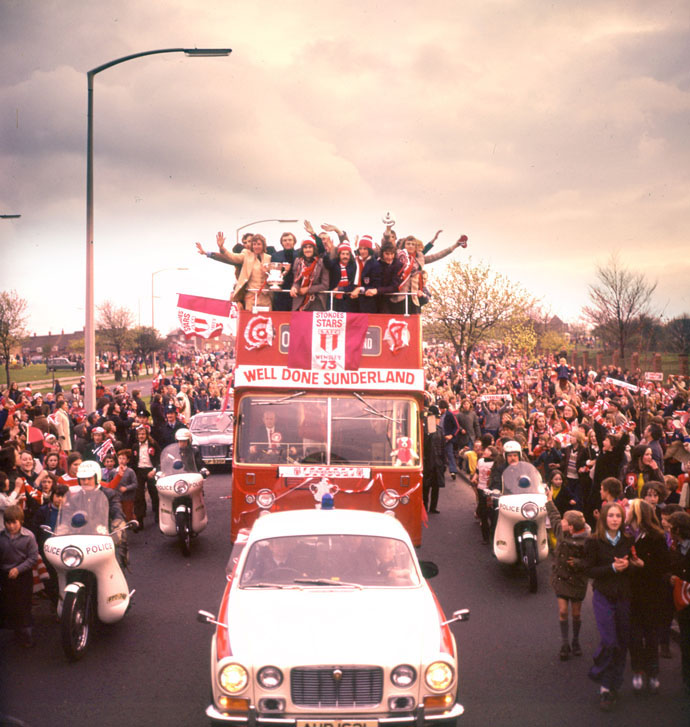
Fans line the streets as the Sunderland team return home after winning the 1973 FA Cup Final.

Sunderland A.F.C. supporters are the followers of Sunderland A.F.C., an English professional football club based in the city of Sunderland, Tyne and Wear. Sunderland A.F.C. were formed in 1879 and joined The Football League for the 1890–91 season. They experienced an immediate period of success with five league titles in a decade between 1892 and 1902, and added subsequent titles in 1913 and 1936. Supporters of the club, and people from Sunderland in general, are traditionally called Mackems. During their tenure at Roker Park, they were also referred to as Rokerites and Rokermen.

According to the club, there are over 70 branches of official supporters' clubs in England and around the world, including North Korea. The official clubs are represented collectively by a Branch Liaison Council that was formed in the 1970s. In addition, the club has had a SAFC Liaison Group (SLG) since 1994 that works with fans on club issues, as well as an independent supporters group, the Red & White Army (RAWA).

The club's longest running fanzine is A Love Supreme. It was first published in 1989 and has won several awards for best fanzine. Since 2010, the online fanzine Roker Report has operated on the SB Nation blogging network. The longest running fan podcast is Wise Men Say, which was featured heavily on the first season of the Netflix series, Sunderland 'Til I Die. It has run uninterrupted since 2013.

Despite the club's size and lack of connections to Mexico, the club has had a large number of Mexican fans since their promotion to the Premier League for the 2025–26 season. This is due to an online trend where Mexicans support a random European club to confuse international fans.

== Fanbase size ==
After the disbanding of the short-lived Sunderland Albion, Sunderland became the only professional football club in Sunderland, an urban area with a population of 335,000 as of 2011, and the 21st most populous urban area in the United Kingdom. Sunderland was also the largest and most successful of the four professional teams in County Durham (alongside, Gateshead A.F.C., Darlington and Hartlepool United), until the town became part of the newly formed county of Tyne and Wear in 1974. In contrast to teams in London and the North-West, Sunderland benefited historically from a large and relatively uncontested catchment area far beyond the boundary of the town itself, incorporating areas such as South Shields, Durham, Chester-le-Street, Consett, Seaham and Bishop Auckland. Areas north of the River Tyne traditionally fell within the catchment of Newcastle United.

Sunderland's attendances typically reflect their status as a one-club city with a large traditional catchment area. Despite a long period with relatively little success, Sunderland held the third highest average attendance in the country in the 2000–01 season with 46,791 fans. A 2019 survey by the International Centre for Sports Studies (CIES) showed that over between 2013 and 2018, Sunderland recorded the 38th highest average attendance in world football with an average of 39,249 fans at the Stadium of Light. Sunderland's average attendance were higher over that period than perennial title challengers such as Juventus FC in Italy and FC Porto in Portugal. Despite relegation from the Premier League in 2017 and subsequent relegation from The Championship at the end of the 2018 season, Sunderland continued to record high attendances. Sunderland broke the League One division attendance record on 26 December 2018 in a match against Bradford City with a total of 46,039 fans; it was the largest crowd outside of the Premier League that season, a feat repeated on 6 May 2022 when 44,742 watched a game v Sheffield Wednesday. Sunderland's average attendance of 32,157 in the 2018–19 season was an English third-tier record and the largest average attendance outside of the Premier League.

== Nicknames ==
Supporters of A.F.C. Sunderland have historically been named Mackems as are the populace of the city. However, during their near 100-year history at Roker Park both the fans and the club were also known as Rokerites while club and players were sometimes known as Rokermen, Roker Men or derivatives of. The old nicknames became obsolete after the club left Roker Park for the Stadium of Light in 1997 but have stayed in use.

In 2000 a public vote was held for supporters to choose the first ever official nickname for the club from five options picked by the club. The overwhelming number of respondents supported the nickname of 'The Black Cats'. The origin of the nickname has been speculated on and various stories may be apocryphal, but the imagery of a black cat has long been associated with the club both on the crest and memorabilia, and was used throughout the clubs history on club merchandise and supporters clubs prior to becoming official.

== Politics ==
According to a YouGov poll in 2014, supporters of Sunderland showed a tendency towards left politics. Like the rest of Tyne and Wear, the city of Sunderland itself is a stronghold for the Labour Party, as it is a traditionally working-class city.

In 2013 the club appointed Paolo Di Canio as manager. Di Canio was long associated with Italian Fascism having spoke generously of Benito Mussolini in his 2001 autobiography. During the 2010 season he was pictured giving the Roman salute while playing for S.S. Lazio against clubs considered to have left leaning politics.

In response to his appointment club vice-chairman David Miliband resigned. The appointment also met with opposition from the Durham Miners' Association which threatened to remove one of its mining banners from Sunderland's Stadium of Light.

== Songs ==
A song heard in every match is one to the chorus of "Can't Help Falling in Love" by Elvis Presley, with "Sunderland" being sang repeatedly after "but I can't help falling in love with you."

During Gus Poyet's tenure, Sunderland fans started singing "Things Can Only Get Better" by D:Ream. Supporters of Sunderland launched a campaign to get the song back into the chart, to coincide with their team's Capital One Cup Final on 2 March 2014 at Wembley Stadium. On 3 March 2014, the song re entered in the UK Dance Chart at No. 19.

Two of the most famous chants by Sunderland supporters are "I'm Sunderland till I die..." and "We're by far the greatest team, the World has ever seen" – with the former being chosen as the title of the Netflix show Sunderland 'Til I Die. One of the oldest Sunderland chants is "Ha'way the lads..." which was sung at Sunderland games as far back as the 1960s.

In 1996, a group of Sunderland fans under the name Simply Red and White released a song called "Daydream Believer (Cheer Up Peter Reid)" to the melody of "Daydream Believer" dedicated to the manager Peter Reid. The song peaked at number 41 in the UK Singles & Album Chart. The fans recorded the song due to the fact the manager often had a dour demeanour, whilst the team was doing well, and even won promotion at the end of the season.

== Popular culture ==
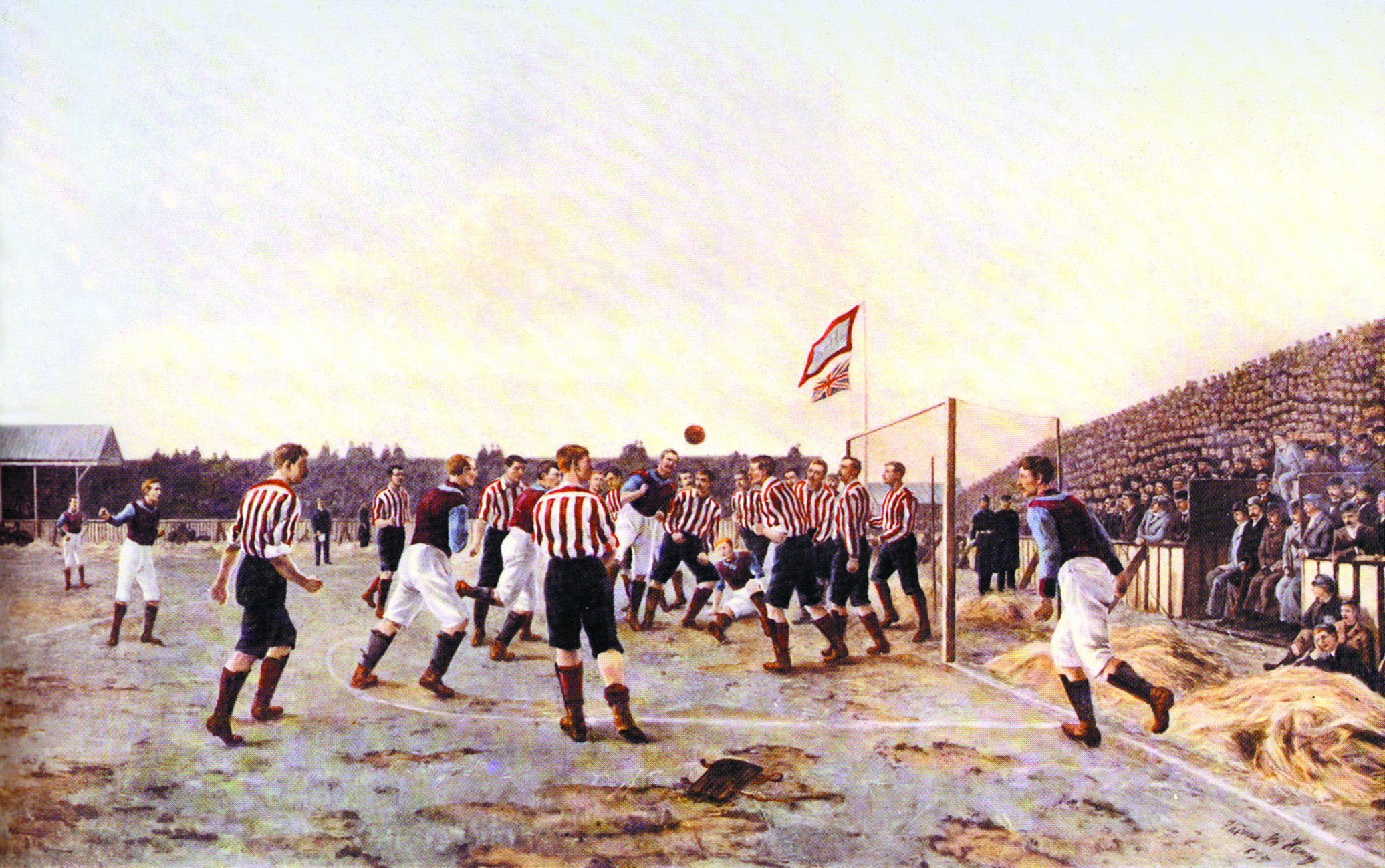
Sunderland fans can be seen in one of the earliest football paintings in the world, Thomas MM Hemy's "Sunderland v. Aston Villa 1895," depicting a match between the teams.

Sunderland fans can be seen in of one of the earliest football paintings in the world – possibly the earliest – when in 1895 the artist Thomas M. M. Hemy painted a picture of a game between Sunderland and Aston Villa at Sunderland's then ground Newcastle Road.

In 2018 television producers and Sunderland fans Ben Turner, Gabe Turner and Leo Pearlman co-produced the Netflix documentary series Sunderland 'Til I Die with their production company Fulwell 73. The "Fulwell End" was the name of a stand at Roker Park and "73" is a reference to the 1973 FA Cup Final, the last time the club won a major trophy. The production company had been linked with a takeover of the club in 2017 but had pulled out prior to the start of filming.

The show ran for three seasons and was a behind the scenes fly on the wall documentary following the trials and tribulations of the club following their relegation from the Premier League, often featuring the perspective of fans of the club.

== Friendships and rivalries ==
Traditionally, Sunderland's main rivals are Newcastle United, with whom they contest the Tyne–Wear derby. Sunderland also shares a rivalry with Middlesbrough, commonly known as the Tees–Wear derby. The club shared a rivalry with the now defunct Sunderland Albion in the 1880s and 1890s, a breakaway club formed by Sunderland's founder James Allan. In recent seasons the club has also developed a minor rivalry with Portsmouth, mainly stemming from the clubs meeting each other 5 times in the 18/19 season. Conversely, sections of fans share a mutual friendship with Dutch club Feyenoord; this was developed after Wearside shipbuilders found jobs in Rotterdam during the 1970s and 80s.

The club also has good relations with Norwich City, matches between the two clubs being known as the Friendship Trophy, following good rapport in the 1985 Milk Cup final.

== Hooliganism ==
The most famous hooligan firm is the Seaburn Casuals, named after the Seaburn area near Roker Park stadium, even though early hooligan firms of Sunderland fans appeared as far back as the 1970s and the 1980s, like the Vauxies (named after the Vaux Breweries), who were active in the late 1970s and early 1980s.

At the end of the 1999–2000 and the 2002–03 seasons, Sunderland topped the hooliganism table in the Premier League with 223 and 154 fan arrests, respectively. According to official data released by the Football Banning Order Authority, Sunderland's fanbase was named third most dangerous in English football in 2013–14, and in particular, a group called The Sunderland Youth Firm was noted in the context of its clashes with West Ham United fans.

Before the 1998 FIFA World Cup, 26 Seaburn Casuals hooligans were arrested in a police raid after a military-issue smoke bomb was let out at a local pub after a fight with bouncers. By the end of the operation, over 60 were facing charges. Some of the Seaburn Casuals hooligans picked up in the raid were also involved with neo-Nazi groups like Combat 18. The operation failed when judge ruled CCTV footage from the pub inadmissible.

In March 2002, the Seaburn Casuals fought with hooligans from the Newcastle Gremlins in a pre-arranged clash near the North Shields Ferry terminal, in what was described as "some of the worst football related fighting ever witnessed in the United Kingdom". The leaders of the Gremlins and Casuals were both jailed for four years for conspiracy, with 28 others jailed for various terms, based on evidence gained after police examined the messages sent by mobile phone between the gang members on the day.

== Notable supporters ==
Notable supporters with verifiable citations confirming their support or allegiance for Sunderland are listed.

=== Athletes ===
- Paul Collingwood – cricketer.
- Steve Cram – track and field athlete, silver medal at the 1984 Olympic Games.
- Billy Hardy - professional boxer.
- Jordan Henderson – association football player.
- Steph Houghton- former professional Footballer and Lionesses captain.
- Jill Scott - former professional footballer and winner of I’m a Celebrity… Get Me Out of Here in 2022.
- Tony Jeffries – professional boxer, bronze medal in the 2008 Summer Olympics.
- Josh Kelly - professional boxer, WBA International welterweight title holder.
- John Lowe – darts world champion.
- Jackie Milburn (as a boy) - footballer.
- Daniel Neil - association football player.
- Martin O'Neill – Northern Irish football manager and player.
- Jordan Pickford - association football goalkeeper.

=== Business ===
- Peter Vardy – businessman, automotive retail business.
- Tom Cowie – businessman, Arriva Group.

=== Comedians ===
- Alfie Joey – comedian, radio presenter.
- Bobby Knoxall – comedian.
- Tom Binns – comedian, writer.
- Chris Distefano-American comedian & podcaster

=== Film ===
- Melanie Hill – actress, Auf Wiedersehen, Pet, Coronation Street.
- Debbie Arnold
- Peter O'Toole – stage and film actor, T. E. Lawrence in Lawrence of Arabia, record for the most Academy Award nominations for acting without a win.
- David Parfitt – Oscar-winning producer.
- Richard Short – stage and film actor.
- Gabe Turner – producer, one of the founders of Fulwell 73.
- Ben Turner – writer, director, one of the founders of Fulwell 73.
- Leo Pearlman – producer, one of the founders of Fulwell 73.

=== Music ===
- Don Airey – keyboardist, Deep Purple, Rainbow.
- Thomas Allen – operatic baritone.
- Tasmin Archer – pop singer.
- Peter Brewis – musician, Field Music.
- Frankie Francis - singer, Frankie & The Heartstrings.
- Dickie Hammond - guitarist, Leatherface and Angelic Upstarts.
- Alex Kapranos – Musician, Franz Ferdinand.
- Lauren Laverne – singer, Kenickie.
- Alan Price – keyboardist, The Animals.
- Tim Rice – lyricist and author.
- David A. Stewart – musician, Eurythmics.
- Frankie Stubbs – punk musician, guitarist and lead singer for Leatherface.
- Jojo Siwa –American singer & dancer

=== Politicians ===
- Ian Lucas – Labour MP for Wrexham, Wales.
- Сhris Mullin – Labour MP for Sunderland South, journalist, author.
- Jonathan Reynolds – Labour MP for Stalybridge and Hyde.
- Justin Welby Archbishop of Canterbury

=== Television personalities ===
- George Clarke – architect, television presenter, lecturer and writer.
- Chris Hughes – model, television personality and former footballer.
- Glenn Hugill – television presenter and producer.
- Chris Cowey – television presenter and producer.
- David Jones – sports presenter for Sky Sports.
- Denise Robertson – writer and television broadcaster.
- Nicky Crosby – television broadcaster.
- Tommy Banks – Michelin-starred television chef.

=== Writers and journalists ===
- Kate Adie – journalist, Chief News Correspondent for BBC News.
- James Herriot – veterinary surgeon and writer.
- Terry Deary – children's author, Horrible Histories series.
- Barry Glendenning- sports journalist who holds the position of deputy sports editor on the guardian.co.uk website run by UK newspaper The Guardian
- Kevin Maguire – political journalist, associate editor at the Daily Mirror, reporter for The Guardian.
- Jonathan Wilson – Author, editor of The Blizzard and sports journalist for The Guardian.

== See also ==
- Sunderland 'Til I Die
