= Foundation of Light =

Charity

- Founded: 6 September 2001
- Type: Registered Charity
- Headquarters: Beacon of Light
- Location: Sunderland
- Region served: North East England
- Official language: English
- Key people: Sir Bob Murray CBE
- Employees: 130
- Website: foundationoflight.co.uk

The Foundation of Light (Previously called the SAFC Foundation) is a Registered Charity in the United Kingdom, and is the independent charitable foundation of professional football club Sunderland A.F.C. It is the biggest football charity in the UK.

It was founded on 6 November 2001 by Sunderland chairman Bob Murray. The charity's patron is the Duchess of Edinburgh and the Chief executive officer is Lesley Spuhler OBE.

== History ==
In 1988, Sunderland took part in the 'Community Programme in Professional Football’, a scheme aimed at encouraging links between football clubs and their local communities. This became the 'Football in the Community' initiative in the early 1990s, which Sunderland were involved in from the beginning.

In November 2001, Sunderland chairman Bob Murray announced the separation of Sunderland's charitable and community work from the mainstream club activity, and the independent SAFC Foundation was created. The foundation was initially supported with funding from Sunderland A.F.C., Northern Rock and the Coalfields Regeneration Trust.

The Foundation's main charitable aim is to:

Advance the education (including the social and physical training) of children and young persons attending schools and clubs in the area, through the use of football and other sports activities as educational tools and thereof to provide facilities for meetings, lectures and classes for the benefit of such young children and young persons.

Within a year, the Foundation had a staff of 70 who engaged with school children in 280 schools, predominantly in Sunderland and County Durham. Initially, classrooms within the Academy of Light were used for the Foundation, as well as two mobile double-decker buses containing specialist classrooms. The custom-built Centre for Light opened in 2004, a £1.6m learning facility built within the Stadium of Light. The centre included five learning areas supporting up to 120 visiting children per day.

The Foundation regularly undertakes various fund-raising activities. In 2011, it collaborated with Durham Cathedral on a 'Carols of Light' event. The event was produced by Tim Rice and included music performances from Thomas Allen, former Animals member Alan Price, and Sunderland based band The Futureheads. Readings were performed by SAFC Foundation Trustee and former player Niall Quinn, in addition to other sports and media celebrities including journalist Kate Adie, and presenter Steve Cram.

In 2012, the SAFC Foundation was rebranded as the Foundation of Light.

In 2015, the Foundation was granted permission to open a free school next to the Stadium of Light. The Sunderland Centre for Opportunity (SCOO) would offer opportunities for vulnerable children who struggle in mainstream education.

In September 2018, the Beacon of Light opened, and became the new official home of the Foundation of Light. The £20m, five-storey building, which sits alongside the Stadium of Light, includes indoor sports courts, indoor and outdoor artificial turf pitches, as well as classrooms and learning spaces.

After purchasing the club in May 2018, Sunderland chairman Stewart Donald joined the Foundation of Light board of trustees on 11 October 2018.

== Financials ==
In 2017, the Foundation of Light raised £11.1m and spent £4.1m. It had £17.8m in assets and £5.5m in liabilities. There were 130 employees and 42 volunteers. Almost 1 million people have been helped by the Foundation since it was created.

== Board of trustees ==
The following people are on the board of trustees:

- Sir Robert Sydney Murray CBE (Chair)
- Sir Peter Vardy
- Sir Tim Rice
- Estelle Morris, Baroness Morris of Yardley
- Kate Adie OBE
- Steve Cram MBE
- Paul Collingwood MBE
- Colonel The Hon James Ramsbotham
- George Clarke
- Baroness Tanni Grey-Thompson DBE
- Kyril Louis-Dreyfus

=== Former Trustees ===
- David Puttnam CBE (resigned 24 June 2013)
- Ellis Short (22 January 2012 to 18 January 2017)
- Niall Quinn (resigned 28 February 2012)
- Stewart Donald (resigned 2023)
