= Roker Report =

Online football fanzine, blog and podcasts

- Website type: Fanzine
- Available in: English
- Website: https://rokerreport.sbnation.com/
- Launched: December 2010

Roker Rapport Podcast
- Genre: Association Football
- Language: English

Creative team
- Created by: Damian Brown – Gavin Henderson – Tom Atkinson – Sean Brown

Cast and voices
- Hosted by: Gavin Henderson – Rich Speight – Chris Wynn – Martin Wanless – Ant Waterson – Brett Lyons-Davis

Production
- Production: Sean Brown

Publication
- No. of episodes: 500+
- Original release: 11 September 2016
- Updates: 3–4 shows weekly: Quick Reaction – Full Match Reviews – Match Previews – Interviews

Related
- Website: https://rokerreport.sbnation.com/roker-rapport-podcast

Roker Report is an online fanzine, blog and accompanying series of podcasts and livestreams related to English football club Sunderland and the club's women's team. Roker Report has interviewed many high-profile former players and celebrities and gained significant attention among Sunderland fans during 2018 when Stewart Donald and Charlie Methven gave exclusive interviews to the podcast team after buying the club. Roker Report has performed an annual charity drive since 2019, and has raised over £120,000 for local charities.

== Fanzine ==
Roker Report was formed in December 2010 by Simon Walsh and was sold to Vox Media In 2011.

A new management and editorial group formed in 2016 with the aim of improving the quality and quantity of the site's content. A substantial recruitment phase took place in the years that followed. Roker Report's website now has over forty regular contributors producing news roundups and opinion pieces on Sunderland as well as many popular regular features such as On This Day and the Roker Ramble. Many former contributors (including Graham Falk and Connor Bromley) have gone on to careers in sports journalism, with some setting up fanzines and podcasts of their own.

Roker Report was nominated for two awards in 2012 EPL Talk Awards, and was shortlisted for a 2018 Football Blogging Award.

The group has helped raise over £120,000 for local charities since Christmas of 2019 when it launched the now annual Roker Report Christmas Fundraiser. In December 2021 a 24-hour continuous broadcast on Twitter Spaces featuring a number of celebrities, sports journalists, broadcasters, current and former Sunderland and Sunderland ladies players and managers – as well as a number of UK based and International fan branches – was attempted successfully and raised roughly £10,000 for the aforementioned campaign in that time period alone.

== Podcasts ==
An original run of Roker Report podcasts were launched in 2011 but were discontinued in 2013. As part of the editorial restructuring in September 2016, the podcast was relaunched with the name Roker Rapport Podcast.

The podcast shows include both quick reaction, and longer more intensive full reviews of the latest match and result, with support from a regular team of contributors and guests – often including local Journalists or broadcasters. Previews of upcoming games are conducted with Journalists and opposition fans, podcasts, and club officials/owners such as Darragh MacAnthony of Peterborough United and Andy Holt of Accrington Stanley.

In May 2018, Roker Report received widespread attention among Sunderland supporters when Stewart Donald and Charlie Methven gave an exclusive interview on the Roker Rapport Podcast immediately after buying the club. This was followed up by several more interviews until November 2019, at which point Roker Report joined a coordinated protest organised by the Red and White Army Supporters' Trust (RAWA) demanding the Sunderland chairman sell the club.

Additional special edition podcasts have included interviews with former chairman and Foundation of Light chair Sir Bob Murray, former vice chairman John Fickling, Sunderland super-fan and now retired SAFC Supporters' Association chairman George Forster, former club secretary Malcolm Bramley, club historian Rob Mason, club officials such as Kevin Ball and prominent Sunderland fans, such as Sky Sports presenter Dave Jones.

Interviews have also been conducted with former Sunderland managers such as Peter Reid and Gus Poyet as well as former Sunderland players such as Niall Quinn, Kevin Phillips and Seb Larsson. The podcast team has also interviewed Sunderland A.F.C. Ladies manager Melanie Reay and players Keira Ramshaw, Claudia Moan, Neve Herron and Grace McCatty and former players Jen O'Neill, Rachel Furness and Beth Mead.

Roker Report also runs a 'Lasses Live' Twitter Spaces broadcast on the social media platform every Monday night, covering all things SAFC Ladies with a variety of guests from opposition clubs in the FA Women's Championship, including journalists, fans and others fighting for equality for the women's game in the UK, such as HerGameToo, the grassroots campaign group for an end to sexism in football, which Roker Report partners with.

As of 2019 the Roker Rapport Podcast has been officially partnered with local Sunderland charity the Sunderland Community Soup kitchen – all advertising revenue generated by the podcast is donated to the charity at the end of each year. The podcast itself operates strictly as non-profit, though the Roker Report on-site advertising is handled by SBNation.
