= Charlie Methven =

British consultant, journalist and publisher (born 1976)

- Born: Charles Harry Finlayson Methven; June 1976
- Education: Eton College
- Alma mater: Exeter College, Oxford
- Occupations: Public relations consultant, journalist and publisher

Charles Harry Finlayson Methven is an English football executive, adviser and podcaster. Earlier in his career he worked as a journalist and communications consultant.

== Early life and education ==
Methven was born in June 1976 and brought up largely in rural Oxfordshire and went to Eton College. He went on to read Theology at Exeter College, Oxford.

== Career ==
=== Journalism ===
In 1997, he started his career as a journalist for the horseracing paper Sporting Life, and later transferred to The Daily Telegraph, where he went on to edit the Peterborough diary column before being given his own column in 2003. He also wrote features and leaders for The Telegraph and The Spectator during this time. In 2002, he was elected the Telegraph Group's ‘Father of the Chapel’ (the term used to denote a shop steward of the National Union of Journalists). During a subsequent dispute with management, the Telegraph's NUJ Chapel, led by Methven, went on to pass the first national newspaper strike ballot in over a decade.

=== Publisher ===
In 2005, in a consortium that included former Daily Telegraph director Jeremy Deedes, Methven founded a daily horseracing and gambling newspaper titled The Sportsman; it was the UK's first new nationally distributed newspaper since The Independent in 1986. While the paper reached a circulation of over 20,000 copies a day, it ran out of funds in late 2006 and folded.

=== Public relations ===
In 2011, he co-founded a communications consultancy called Dragon Associates which has advised clients such as the Kingdom of Bahrain.

== Football clubs ==
=== Oxford United F.C. ===
A life-long supporter of Oxford United, Methven became a founding committee member of Oxford's supporters' trust, OxVox. In 2011, he became a Trustee of OUFC's Youth and Community Trust, founded supporters group the Yellow Army. Methven had launched an attempt to buy the club with subsequent business partner Stewart Donald, but was outbid.

=== Sunderland A.F.C. ===
In May 2018, Methven arranged for Juan Sartori and Stewart Donald to buy Sunderland from American billionaire Ellis Short. Methven bought 6% of the club and was appointed as its Executive Director. The takeover is featured in Episode 8 of Netflix documentary Sunderland 'Til I Die: A Fresh Start. Prior to Sunderland's acquisition by Donald, Sartori, and Methven it had been relegated twice consecutively and was £160 million in debt and losing over £20 million per annum. The club had been expected by many industry experts to go into administration. Under its new leadership, the club achieved the highest-ever season average attendance for the third tier of English football (31,500), the highest single-match attendance for League One (46,039 vs Bradford City on Boxing Day 2018) and the highest revenues in League One history. SAFC also received Football Business’ Marketing Award for season 2018/2019 for the club's ‘Big Seat Change’ initiative and was nominated by the Football Supporters' Association for their Best Fan Engagement award.

Methven clashed with fan groups on several occasions. In a BBC Radio Newcastle interview in September 2018, he described Sunderland fans who chose to watch illegal live streams in pubs adjoining the stadium instead of paying to watch matches as ‘parasites’, a word he subsequently described as "ill-chosen". Over a year later, he was the subject of a leak from a private meeting with fans group leaders at a meeting to clarify what they were concerned might have been a misleading statement made by him to the press. He explained to The Times, who published the leak, that he had "felt exasperated" by the negative reaction to something he regarded as good news and had reacted "intemperately".

Following the leaked account of the private meeting by The Times, Methven said he had already given notice of his resignation from Sunderland's board, eventually stepping down in December 2019 citing the pressures of business and family life. He explained in a statement that his wife was in the latter stages of pregnancy and that his consultancy clients expected him to be in London more often in 2020. He continued as a shareholder of the club, and as a director of its holding company, Madrox Partners Limited.

=== Charlton Athletic F.C. ===
On 5 June 2023, Charlton Athletic announced that SE7 Partners, comprising Methven and Edward Warrick, had agreed a takeover of the club. On 19 July 2023, the EFL and FA cleared SE7 Partners to take over the club, and the deal was completed on 21 July 2023.

Under manager Nathan Jones, the 2024–25 season started slowly, but gathered momentum around the turn of the year, seeing Charlton qualify for the end-of-season-play-offs in fourth place. Charlton went on to win the play-off final, beating Leyton Orient 1–0 on 27 May 2025 at Wembley Stadium, to gain promotion back to the Championship for the first time since relegation from that division in 2020.

In March 2025, Methven announced he would be stepping down as Charlton's CEO. He subsequently left to take up an appointment as managing director of Jamaica Premier League club Mount Pleasant F.A..

=== Mount Pleasant and RAEC Mons ===
Shortly after his appointment to Mount Pleasant F.A., Methven and MPFA owner Peter Gould announced that they had acquired a majority stake in Belgian third tier club RAEC Mons. In December 2025, Mount Pleasant won the CONCACAF Caribbean Cup to get a bye to the last 16 of the CONCACAF Champions Cup.

=== Other sports activities ===
On 27 May 2025, the Global Institute of Sport announced that Methven had joined its board as a non-executive director.

On 6 December 2025, Charlie Stebbings of 20VC announced that its Business of Sport podcast platform would launch a new series called The Breakdown in January 2026, with Methven co-hosting alongside Stebbings.

In March 2026, Methven was linked with bids to buy Sheffield Wednesday F.C..
