= Monkwearmouth Colliery =

Defunct coal mine in Sunderland, UK (1835–1993)

Coordinates: 54°54′52″N 1°23′18″W

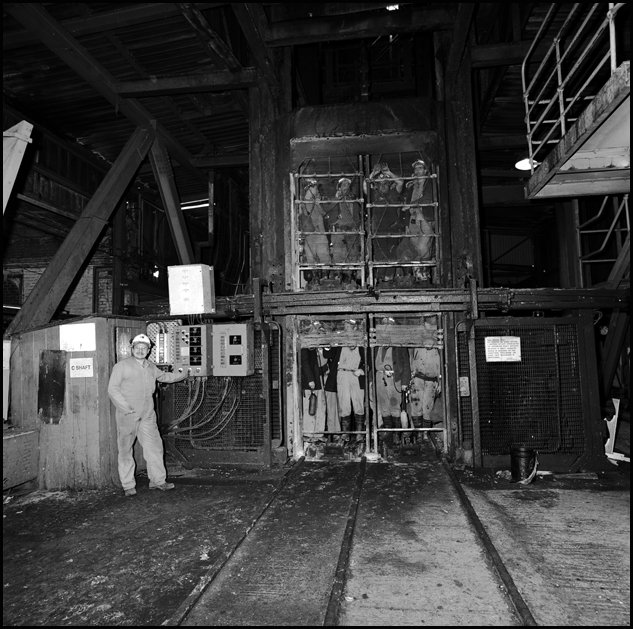
Miners in the cage ready for their descent, Wearmouth Colliery, 1993.

Monkwearmouth Colliery (or Wearmouth Colliery) was a major North Sea coal mine on the north bank of the River Wear in Sunderland, England, United Kingdom. It was the largest mine in the world and one of the most important in County Durham in northeast England. First opened in 1835 and in spite of the many accidents at the pit, the mine was the last to remain operating in the County Durham Coalfield. The last shift left the pit on 10 December 1993, ending over 80 years of commercial coal mining in the region. The Colliery site was cleared soon afterwards, and the Stadium of Light, the stadium of Sunderland A.F.C., was built over it, opening in July 1997 to replace nearby Roker Park.

== See also ==
- Northeast England
