= Anne McElvoy =

British journalist

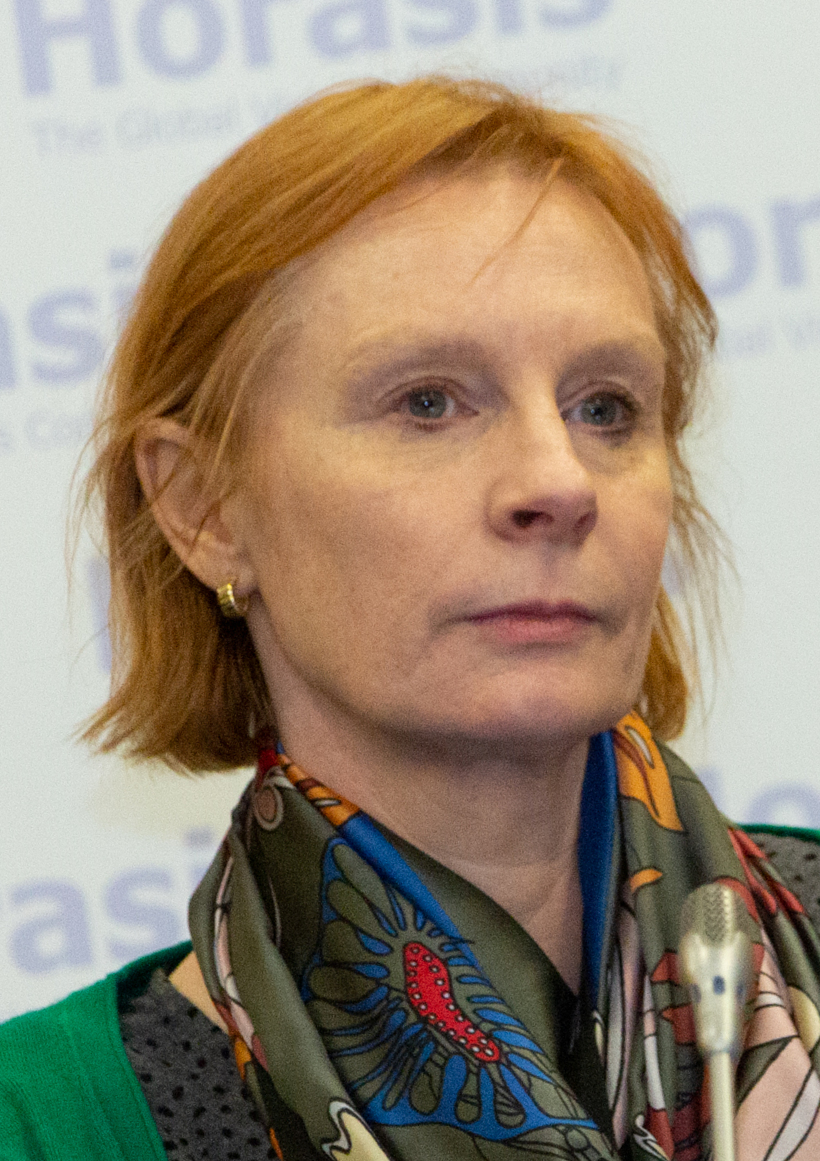
- McElvoy at the Horasis Global Meeting in 2019
- Born: 25 June 1965 (age 60); County Durham, England
- Education: Wadham College, Oxford (BA); University of Berlin
- Occupations: Journalist; Broadcaster
- Spouse: Martin Ivens (m. 1994)
- Children: 3
- Parent(s): Alexander McElvoy; Mary Margaret Bartley/McElvoy

Anne McElvoy (born 25 June 1965) is a British journalist, contributing to The Economist, London Evening Standard, and the BBC.

== Early life ==
McElvoy attended St Bede's RC Comprehensive School in Lanchester, County Durham, and read German and Philosophy at Wadham College, Oxford. While at Oxford University, she edited Cherwell, the student newspaper. She spent a year at the Humboldt University of Berlin, then in East Berlin, studying East German literature and censorship.

== Career ==
=== Newspapers ===
She joined The Times in 1988 as a graduate trainee, writing frequently about the dissolution of eastern Europe, and later reporting from Moscow. In 1995, she became deputy editor of The Spectator, as well as being a columnist on its sister publication, The Daily Telegraph.

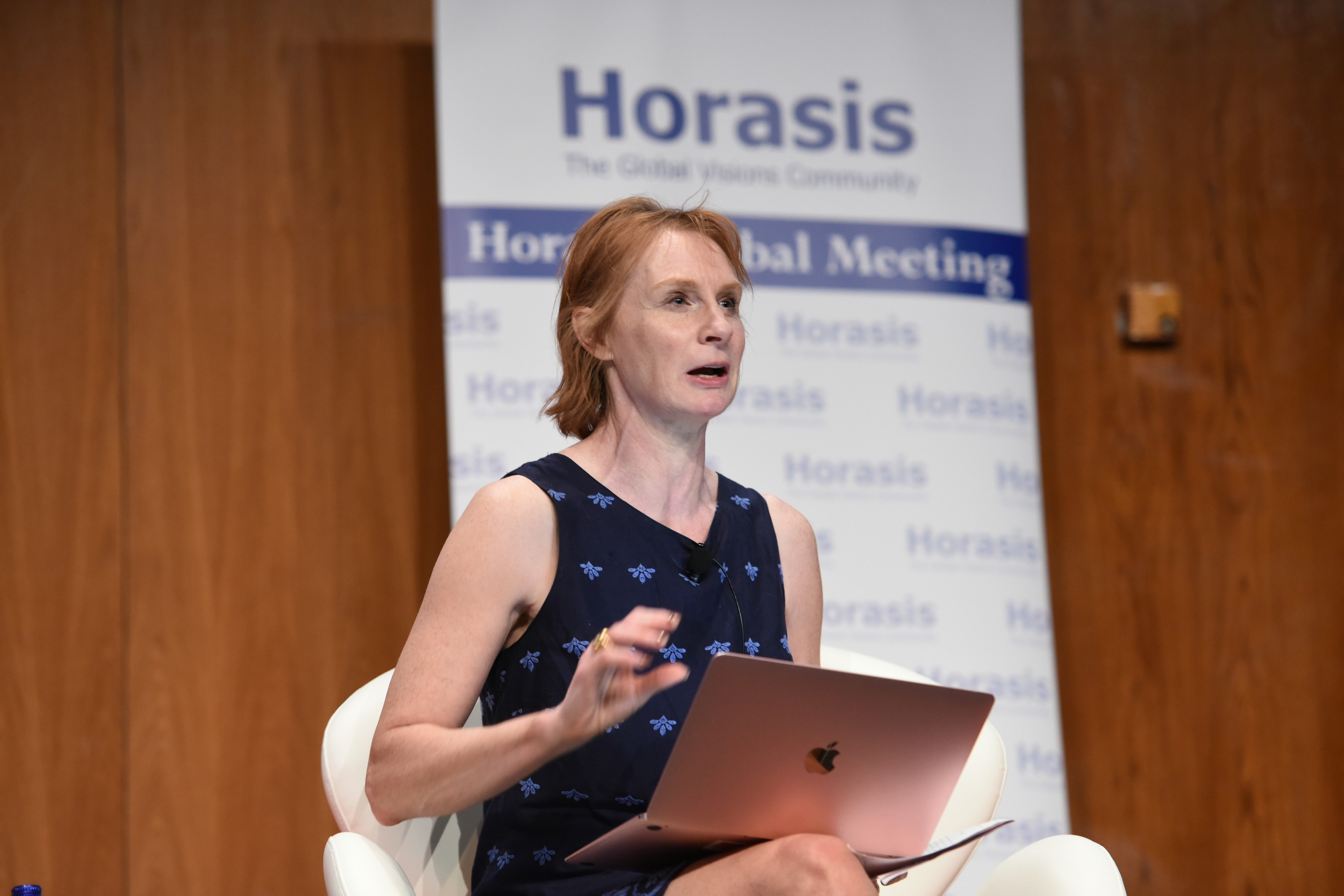
McElvoy at the Horasis Global Meeting in 2017

In 1997, McElvoy became associate editor of The Independent. In 2002 she moved to the Evening Standard as executive editor remaining until 2009, though she still contributes a weekly political column. In 2009 she joined The Economist. She wrote The Saddled Cow: East Germany's Life And Legacy, and is the co-author of Markus Wolf's best-selling memoir Man Without A Face: The Autobiography Of Communism's Greatest Spymaster.

=== Broadcasting ===
She has been a regular presenter of the BBC Radio 3 late-night discussion programme since 2009, initially on Night Waves, and then its successor programme, Free Thinking. She has also appeared on BBC2's Newsnight Review, contributes to BBC Radio 4's The Moral Maze as well as presenting Across the Red Line, bringing two figures on opposing sides of a debate together with conflict resolution experts to listen to each other. She was the head of Economist Radio, and subsequently joined Politico as Executive Editor - Head of Audio in February 2023.

== Personal life ==
She and her husband have two daughters and one son.

== Publications ==
- McElvoy, Anne (1992). The Saddled Cow: East Germany's Life And Legacy. Faber and Faber (ISBN 978-0571165919)
- Wolf, Markus and McElvoy, Anne (1997). Man Without A Face: The Autobiography of Communism's Greatest Spymaster. Jonathan Cape Ltd. (ISBN 978-0224044981)
