= St Bede's Catholic School and Sixth Form College =

Location
- Consett Road; Lanchester, County Durham, DH7 0RD; England, United Kingdom; 54°49′41″N 1°44′49″W

Information
- Type: Academy
- Motto: Fortes in Fide
- Religious affiliation: Roman Catholic
- Established: 1964
- Local authority: Durham County Council
- Trust: Bishop Wilkinson Catholic Education Trust
- Department for Education URN: 138172 Tables
- Ofsted: Reports
- Headteacher: Catherine Hammill
- Chaplain: Angela Eddy
- Gender: Coeducational
- Age: 11 to 18
- Enrolment: 1396
- Colours: Red, White and Black
- Website: http://www.stbedes.durham.sch.uk/

St Bede's Catholic School and Sixth Form College is a coeducational secondary school and sixth form with academy status, located in Lanchester, County Durham, England. It has a main block, a language block, a technology/music block, the sixth form block, two fields, tennis/basketball court and an astroturf. On 1 June 2012, the school converted from secondary to academy, giving it independence from the local authority. The school is currently owned and operated by Bishop Wilkinson Catholic Education Trust, and has been fully integrated since mid-2020.

The school opened its new sixth-form centre in November 2007 following a £5 million refurbishment, which included construction work on the new building and rebuilding science laboratories. Sir Tom Cowie, who lived in Lanchester, donated £500,000 to the project, which was named in his honour. St Bede's is frequently cited as the top-performing school in County Durham.

== Incidents ==
In all of its history, St. Bede's has gone through one notable incident, including suspected homophobia. Back in 2017, the school put up a poster for Religious Studies reading "Homosexuality is a disordered behaviour that must be condemned". Many news outlets talked about this incident. Within days, then-headteacher, Neville Harrison, came out and said the poster was taken out of context. There was no formal investigation, yet, the school is now reconsidering how such materials are displayed.

== Notable former pupils ==
- Anne McElvoy, journalist
