= Kildare Partners =

British private equity investment firm

- Type: Private Equity
- Industry: Real estate
- Founded: 2013
- Headquarters: London, W1; United Kingdom
- Key people: Ellis Short (Founder and Chief Investment Officer), Ryan Horstman (Chief Financial Officer)
- Total assets: $3.4 billion
- Number of employees: 76
- Website: www.kildarepartners.com

Kildare Partners is a London-based private equity firm that invests in distressed European real estate assets.

== History ==
Kildare Partners was founded in London in 2013 by Ellis Short, who was also named Chief Investment Officer. The firm operates additional offices in Dublin, Ireland and Dallas, Texas, and is focused on real estate in western Europe. They are based at 1 Berkeley Street, Mayfair, London.

In May 2014, Deutsche Bank sold the remaining distressed assets in its €1 billion Mars portfolio of distressed German assets to Kildare Partners.

In 2018, Kildare Partners announced that the firm an agreement to make a voluntary cash tender offer to acquire all shares in Technopolis, a shared workspace provider.
