= Technopolis Oyj =

Finnish office real estate company

Technopolis
- Type: Privately held company
- Industry: Commercial real estate
- Founded: 1982
- Headquarters: Oulu, Finland
- Number of locations: 13 campuses (2026)
- Area served: Finland, Luxembourg, Norway, Sweden
- Key people: Niko Pulli, CEO
- Owner: Kildare Partners
- Website: www.technopolisglobal.com

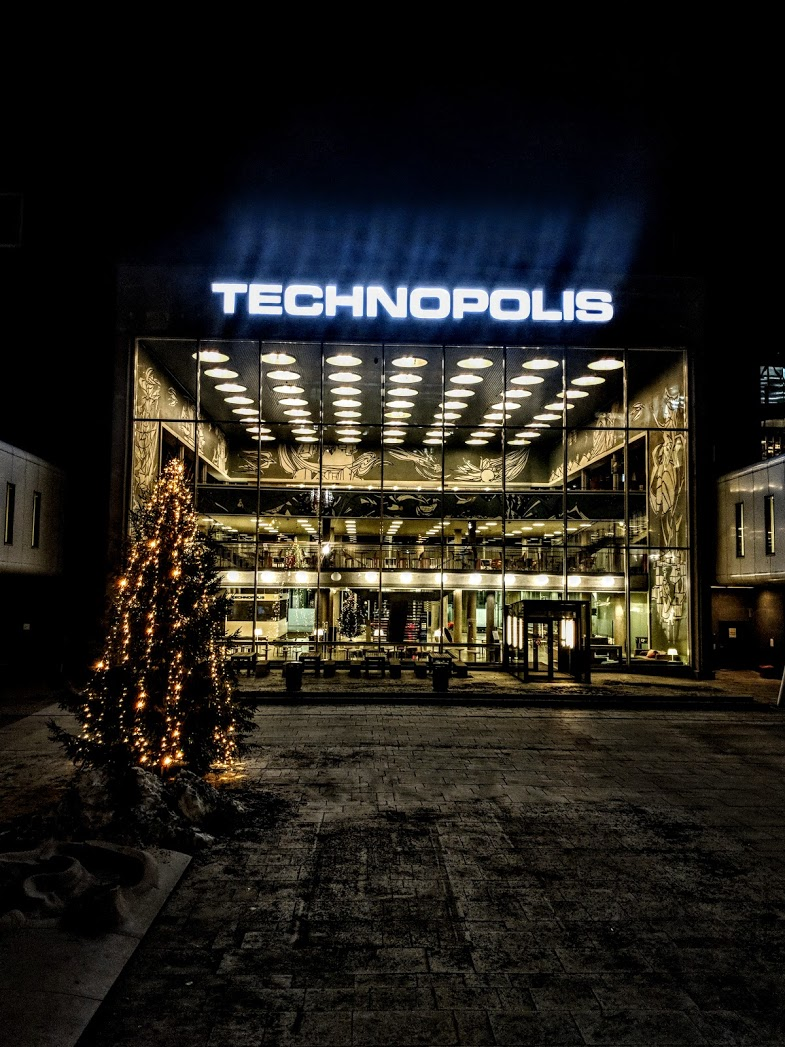
Technopolis Fornebu campus in Oslo

Technopolis is a Finnish privately held company providing high-quality office spaces and related services. Technopolis owns and operates 13 campuses located in Europe, often near universities or city centers. 30,000 people work and 1,200 companies operate in the office campuses. Originally from Oulu, Technopolis campuses are located also in Espoo, Helsinki, Vantaa, and Tampere in Finland, and in Oslo, Norway, Luxembourg City, Luxembourg as well as in Stockholm, Sweden.

In August 2018 Kildare Nordic Acquisitions S.à.r.l. (Kildare Partners) announced a public cash tender offer on all shares in Technopolis Plc. On 31 December 2018 Kildare held 97.4% of all shares.

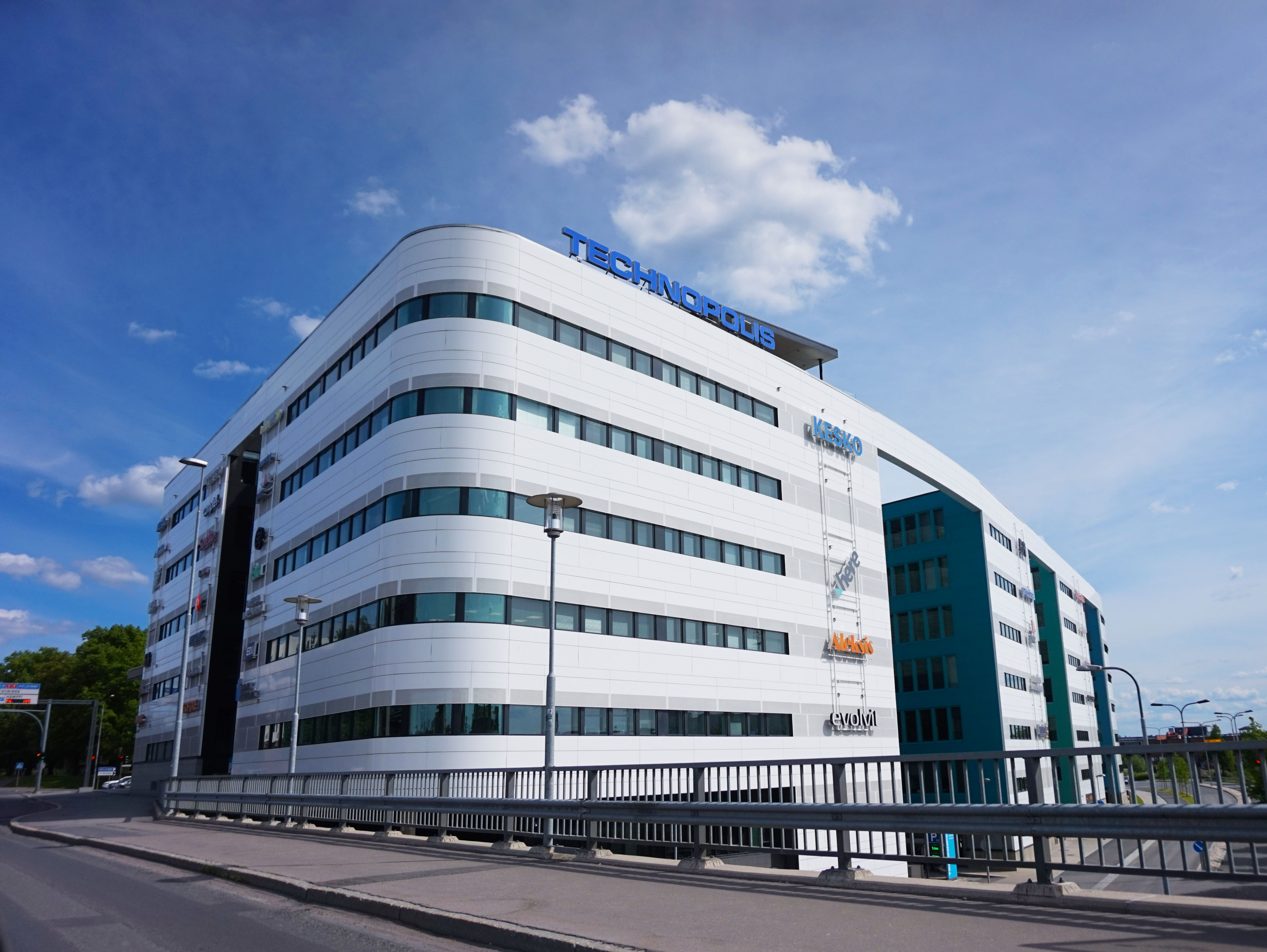
Technopolis Yliopistonrinne campus in Finland

== Campuses ==
| Campus | City |
|---|---|
| Otaniemi | Espoo, Finland |
| Ruoholahti | Helsinki, Finland |
| Gasperich | Luxembourg City, Luxembourg |
| Fornebu | Oslo, Norway |
| Kontinkangas | Oulu, Finland |
| Linnanmaa | Oulu, Finland |
| Peltola | Oulu, Finland |
| Ydinkeskusta | Oulu, Finland |
| Asemakeskus | Tampere, Finland |
| Hermia | Tampere, Finland |
| Yliopistonrinne | Tampere, Finland |
| Kista | Stockholm, Sweden |
| Aviapolis | Vantaa, Finland |
