= Drumaville Consortium =

Group of businessmen involved in takeover of English Premier League

The Drumaville Consortium was a group of seven Irish businessmen and one English businessman led by former footballer Niall Quinn, who were involved in the 2006 takeover of English Premier League football club Sunderland A.F.C.. The consortium was named after the village of Drumaville in County Donegal.

== Members ==
The consortium consisted of Niall Quinn and eight other businessmen:

- Niall Quinn had 1180 shares and was the Chairman of Sunderland A.F.C. – The former Irish international striker was a fan's favourite during his spell at Sunderland. In 2002, he donated the proceeds of his testimonial match to charities in both Sunderland and Ireland. Quinn often expressed his affinity for the club, and in 2006 reports began to circulate that Quinn had spoken to Sunderland chairman Bob Murray with regards to buying out Murray's ownership interest in the club. On 3 July a successful offer for the club was announced, with Quinn becoming club chairman immediately, pending the successful purchase of 90% of the club's shares. On 3 October 2011 Sunderland confirmed that Quinn had stepped down as chairman and handed the role over to Ellis Short, owner of Sunderland until 2018, and had taken a back seat role in international affairs.
- Charlie Chawke had 1180 shares – publican, and owner of the Charlie Chawke Group of pubs and has several pubs in Ireland. In October 2003 Chawke was shot in the leg during an armed robbery of one of his pubs. In 2010, he announced plans to take over Newcastle United for £80 million but the bid fell through. He has five children, and lives in South Co. Dublin.
- Louis Fitzgerald had 1180 shares – Owner of the Louis Fitzgerald Group of 24 pubs with an estimated wealth of £86m. The Dublin publican supremo added another asset to his licensed property portfolio, by snapping up The Arlington Hotel on Bachelors Walk near O'Connell Street in Dublin 1 in an off-market deal believed to be worth €37 million.
- Jack Tierney had 1180 shares – Property developer and owner of Faxhill Homes.
- Paddy Kelly had 2360 shares Paddy is a Property developer and owner of Kelland Homes, Rockbriar and Markland Holdings with an estimated wealth of £80m.
- John Hays had 1180 shares – Owner of Sunderland-based travel company Hays Travel, Hays was the only Sunderland-born member of the consortium.
- Patsy Byrne had 1180 shares – Property developer and owner of Byrne Bros (Formwork) Ltd, that was founded by Patsy and Johnny Byrne in 1969, and is one of the leading UK Concrete Frame contractors.

=== Notes ===
While Sean Mulryan had been rumoured to have been part of the initial consortium, his name was absent from the list of consortium members revealed on 3 July 2006. However, an article on 13 May 2007 in the Irish Sunday Business Post newspaper claimed that "Markland, a company jointly owned by Mulryan and Paddy Kelly[...] owns 25 per cent of Drumaville", suggesting his silent involvement in the club. Mulryan is also reported to have attended at least one Sunderland match in the 2006–7 season.

The Drumaville Consortium, the vehicle for Sunderland's new owners, was registered in the tax haven of Jersey and comprised eight Irish businessmen, some of them prominent, including John Hays, a travel company owner based in Sunderland, and Quinn.

The latest filing at Jersey's Financial Services Commission shows that at 1 January this year, the consortium had paid just over £20m for investment in Sunderland. The Dublin-based Patrick Kelly, of the major house builder Kelland Homes, was then the largest investor, with 2,271 shares bought for £2,058.53 each — a total of £4.6m. The pub group owners Louis Fitzgerald and Charlie Chawke were the next-largest, each having paid £3m.

Hays and his wife Irene (the chief executive of South Tyneside Council) invested £1.6m combined, as did the builders Jack Tierney and Patsy Byrne. Then the developer and house builder Sean Mulryan bought almost £1.5m of shares, Patrick Beirne, managing director of the plastics company Mergon International, invested £1m, and the housing developer James McEvoy £740,000. A further £1.5m was held for unnamed beneficiaries by a Jersey-based trust company.

== Purchase by Short ==
On 7 September 2008 it was reported in the Irish Sunday Business Post that new shares had been issued to raise additional funding of up to £50 million (€62 million) for new players. It was understood that a number of the original consortium members did not take part in the fund rising and therefore their percentage share holding reduced. Niall Quinn was quoted as saying that the Drumaville Consortium was still intact and the individuals behind it remained the driving force behind the club.

On 25 September 2008 it was reported that Ellis Short, a Dallas-based billionaire Irish-American fund manager, became the largest single shareholder in the Drumaville Consortium with a 30% buy-in. It was not known how this affected the shares of the original members. Short is one of the co-founders of Lone Star Funds.

On 27 May 2009 Short announced that he had purchased the remaining shares of the club, becoming the sole owner. Quinn remained as chairman.

== Takeover dates ==
=== Takeover ===
- On 19 April 2006, Quinn confirmed he was in the process of gathering a consortium for the purpose of launching a takeover bid for Sunderland. This followed a month of rumour and speculation.
- Nine days later, on 28 April, Sunderland confirmed they were in talks with a group led by Quinn, although they stated that no firm offer for the club had been made.
- On 14 June, Bob Murray announced his resignation as Sunderland chairman as of 30 June, but announced that he would remain on the board of directors of the club.
- On 3 July, Sunderland announced that they had accepted an offer from the consortium valuing the club at around £10m, with Niall Quinn becoming club chairman.
- On 27 July 2006, Drumaville Ltd took full control of Sunderland Football Club after securing 89.13% of the shares in Sunderland Ltd.

=== Short's buyout ===
- On 25 September 2008 Ellis Short bought 30% of the shares.
- On 27 May 2009 Short purchased the remaining shares.
