= Sunderland Aquatic Centre =

Indoor sports complex in Sunderland, England

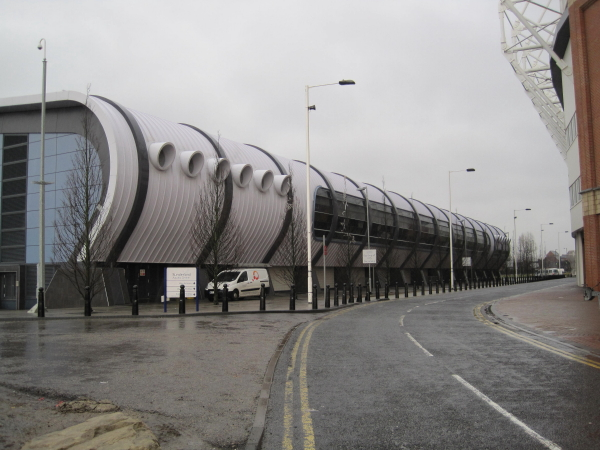
- Interactive map of Sunderland Aquatic Centre
- Location: Stadium Park, Sunderland, SR5 1SU
- Coordinates: 54.914°N 1.390°W
- Owner: Sunderland City Council
- Operator: Everyone Active
- Type: Indoor
- Facilities: Gym, Cafe, Children's soft-play, multi-function activity rooms
- Dimensions: 50 x 25 metres (Olympic-standard); Depth: 2m (adjustable)

Construction
- Opened: 18 April 2008
- Construction cost: £19.8m GBP
- Architect: Red Box

Website
- Official website

Sunderland Aquatic Centre is an indoor sports complex next to the Stadium of Light in the city of Sunderland, England. It contains an Olympic-size swimming pool, a diving pool and a gymnasium. It is the only full Olympic-standard pool in North East England between Glasgow and Leeds.

The centre was opened on 18 April 2008 with a fireworks and lights display. Anne, Princess Royal visited the Aquatic Centre on 22 January 2009 and gave it a second 'opening' ceremony. A third ceremony was held in the presence of the Mayor of Sunderland Mary Smith later that year.

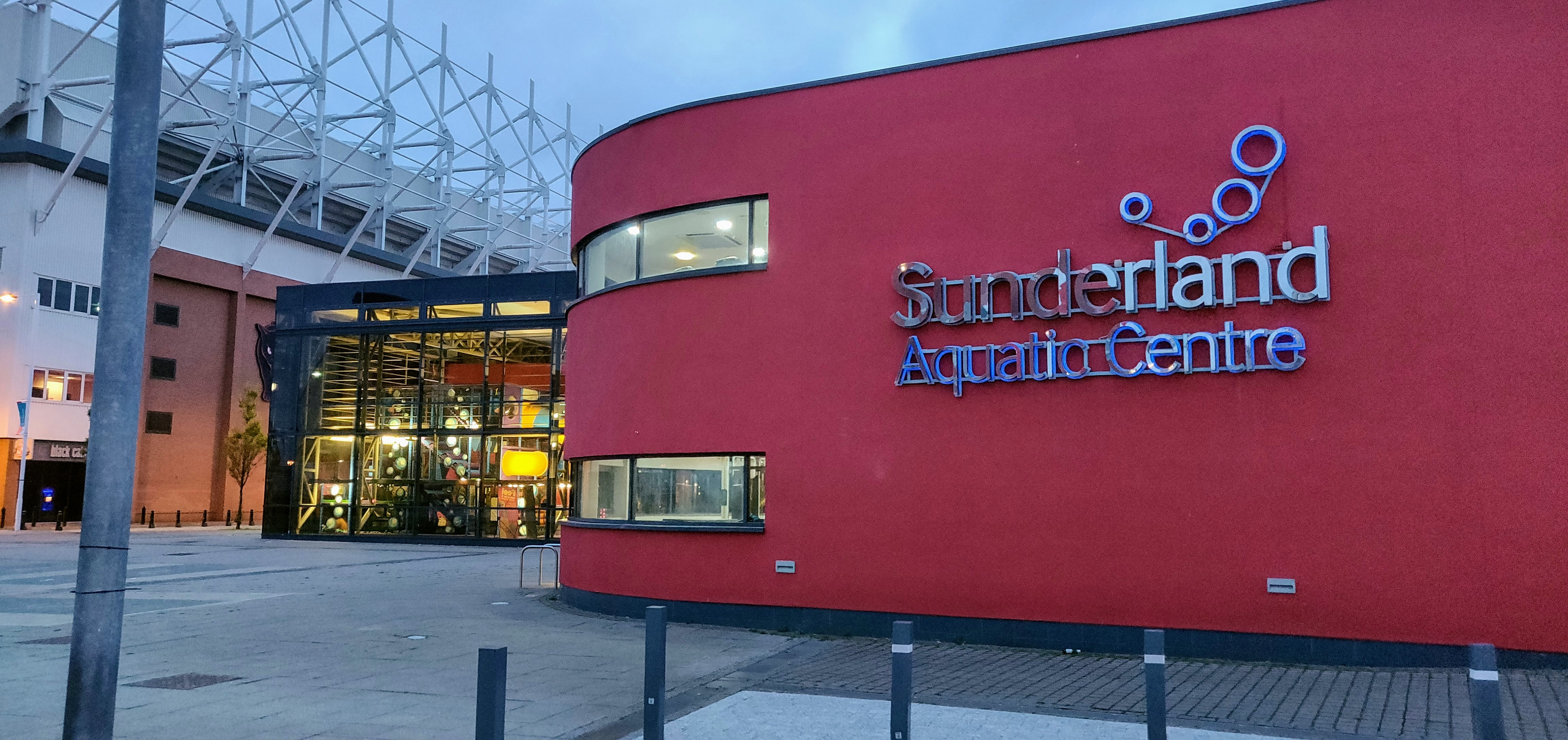
Entrance to the Aquatic Centre with the Stadium of Light in the background

It replaced the swimming pool and gymnasium facilities at the Crowtree Leisure Centre, which was opened in 1978 by Prince Charles. The pool at Crowtree had a tropical beach style with a slide, two diving pools and a wave machine, and was not an Olympic-standard pool. The centre was closed to the general public in October 2011 and demolished in 2013.

On 16 June 2012, the Olympic torch was carried through the Aquatic Centre as part of the 2012 Summer Olympics torch relay.

In February 2017, Sunderland City Council announced that the centre would have to be closed for up to nine months to make structural repairs to the roof, after leaks were reported. They also confirmed they were taking legal action against builder Balfour Beatty. In August 2018, an out-of-court agreement was reached, and Balfour Beatty committed to carry out a programme of work to repair the roof.

== See also ==
- List of Olympic-size swimming pools in the United Kingdom
