= Stadium of Light =

Football stadium in Sunderland, England

Coordinates: 54°54′52″N 1°23′17″W

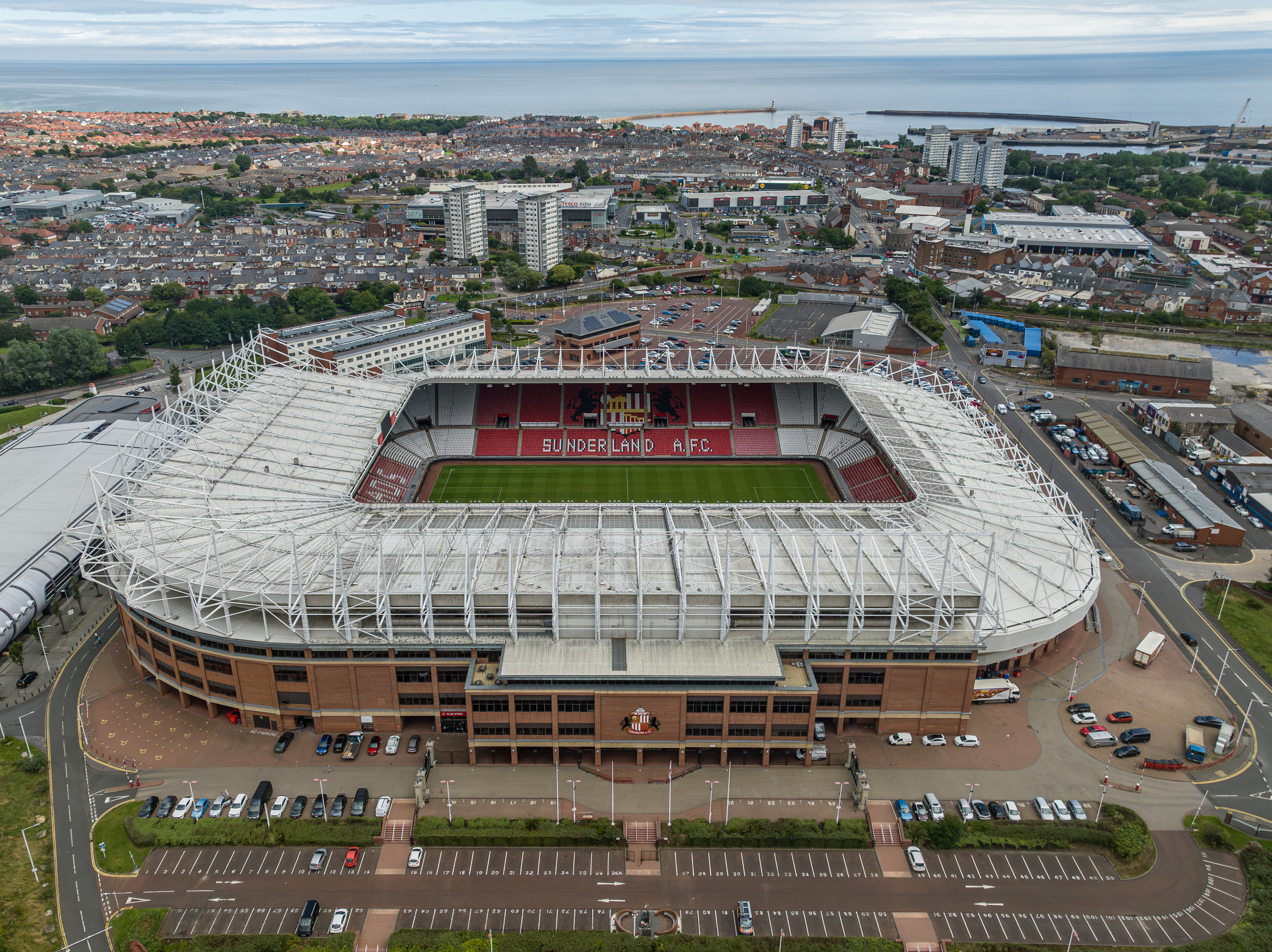
- UEFA
- Interactive map of Stadium of Light
- Full name: Stadium of Light
- Address: Millennium Way
- Location: Monkwearmouth, Sunderland; England; SR5 1SU
- Owner: Sunderland 100%
- Capacity: 49,000 – football 60,000 – concerts
- Surface: Grass
- Record attendance: Football: 48,353 (Sunderland v Liverpool, 13 April 2002); Concerts: 60,000 (Ed Sheeran, 3 June 2022)
- Field size: 115 × 75 yards (105 × 68 metres)
- Public transit: Stadium of Light; St. Peter’s

Construction
- Groundbreaking: May 1996
- Opened: 30 July 1997; 29 years ago
- Expanded: 2000
- Cost: £24 million
- Architect: PNF Architects
- Main contractor: Ballast Wiltshire

Tenant
- Sunderland (1997–present)

The Stadium of Light is an all-seater football stadium in Sunderland, England, and the eighth and current home to Premier League club Sunderland. With seating for 49,000 spectators, the Stadium of Light is the 10th largest football stadium in England. The stadium primarily hosts Sunderland home matches. The stadium was named by chairman Bob Murray to reflect the coal mining heritage of the North East and the former Monkwearmouth Colliery site on which it stands. A Davy lamp monument stands at the entrance to reflect the coal mining industry that brought prosperity to the town.

As well as hosting Sunderland games, the stadium has hosted three matches for the England national football team, as well as an England under-20, an England under-21 and two England women's team matches. With an original capacity of 42,000, it was expanded in 2000 to seat 49,000. Its simple design is apparently to allow for redevelopments up to a capacity of 64,000. The attendance record at the Stadium of Light is 48,353 set on 13 April 2002, when Sunderland played Liverpool with the visitors running out 1–0 winners. Along with hosting football matches, the stadium has played host to performers such as Beyoncé, Rihanna, Oasis, Take That, Kings of Leon, P!nk, Coldplay, Spice Girls, Bruce Springsteen , Red Hot Chilli Peppers and Elton John. The ground also holds conference and banqueting suites, the Black Cats Bar, and a club shop selling Sunderland merchandise.

== Planning and construction ==
Following the release of the Taylor Report in January 1990, Sunderland was obliged to make plans to turn their Roker Park home into an all-seater stadium. Roker Park was a ground that mainly consisted of standing terraces, and if converted into all-seater it would have held far fewer spectators than before. Enclosed by residential streets on all sides, expansion was practically impossible. So, by 1991, Sunderland chairman Bob Murray had started to scour the local area for possible sites to build a new all-seater stadium.

The front-runner that emerged was a proposed stadium located on an area of land adjacent to the Nissan car plant. The 49,000 all-seater ground was labelled "the Wembley of the North" by Sunderland fans and would boast a capacity that not even Manchester United's Old Trafford exceeded until 1996. The plans did not come to fruition. Shortly after the plans were announced in 1992, Nissan launched an official objection, ultimately forcing Sunderland to abandon the idea. By 1995, the site of the Wearmouth Colliery, which had closed in December 1993, was identified as the club's preferred location for a new stadium. The area, on the north bank of the River Wear in the Sheepfolds district of Sunderland, was only a few hundred yards from Roker Park, and close to the centre of the city.

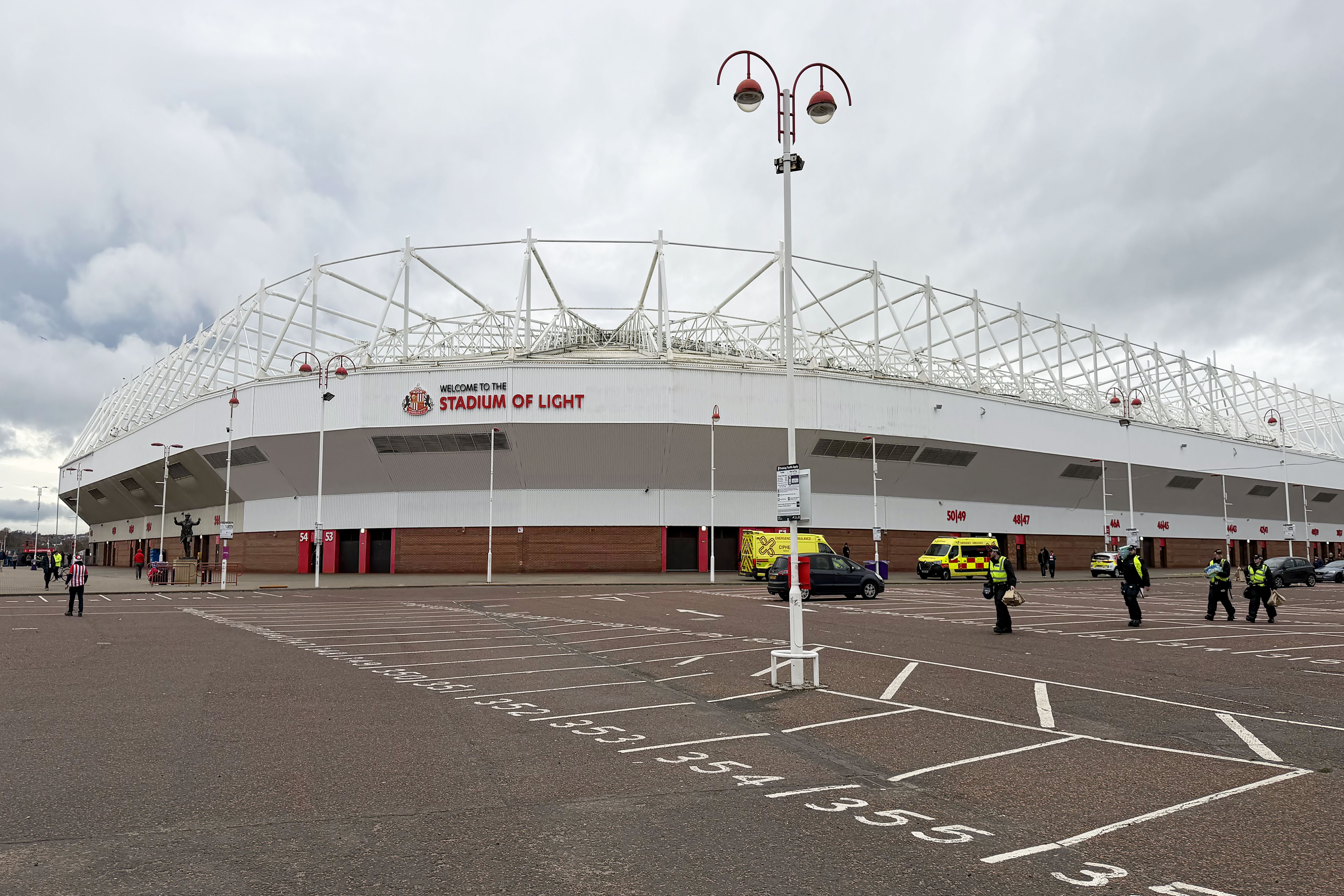
Exterior of the East Stand

In 1993, Sunderland's planned new stadium was on the shortlist for Euro 96 venues, as England had been named as hosts of the competition in May 1992. However, it soon become clear that a new stadium in Sunderland would not be ready in time for the tournament.

On 13 November 1995, the Sunderland chairman Bob Murray announced that the Tyne and Wear Development Corporation had approved plans for Sunderland to build a 34,000-seater stadium on the Monkwearmouth site. Ballast Wiltshier, a contracting company that had built the Amsterdam Arena, was contracted to build the stadium at an initial cost of £15 million. In June 1996, as the planned capacity rose to more than 40,000, construction work began. The capacity was revised again in early 1997, and the stadium was completed on time, with a capacity of 42,000. The stadium's design allows possible expansion of a further tier; completed expansion of the whole upper tier would produce a capacity of 63,000, although it is believed by some that the stadium can expand to a maximum capacity of 84,000, this would seem unlikely ever to be exercised.

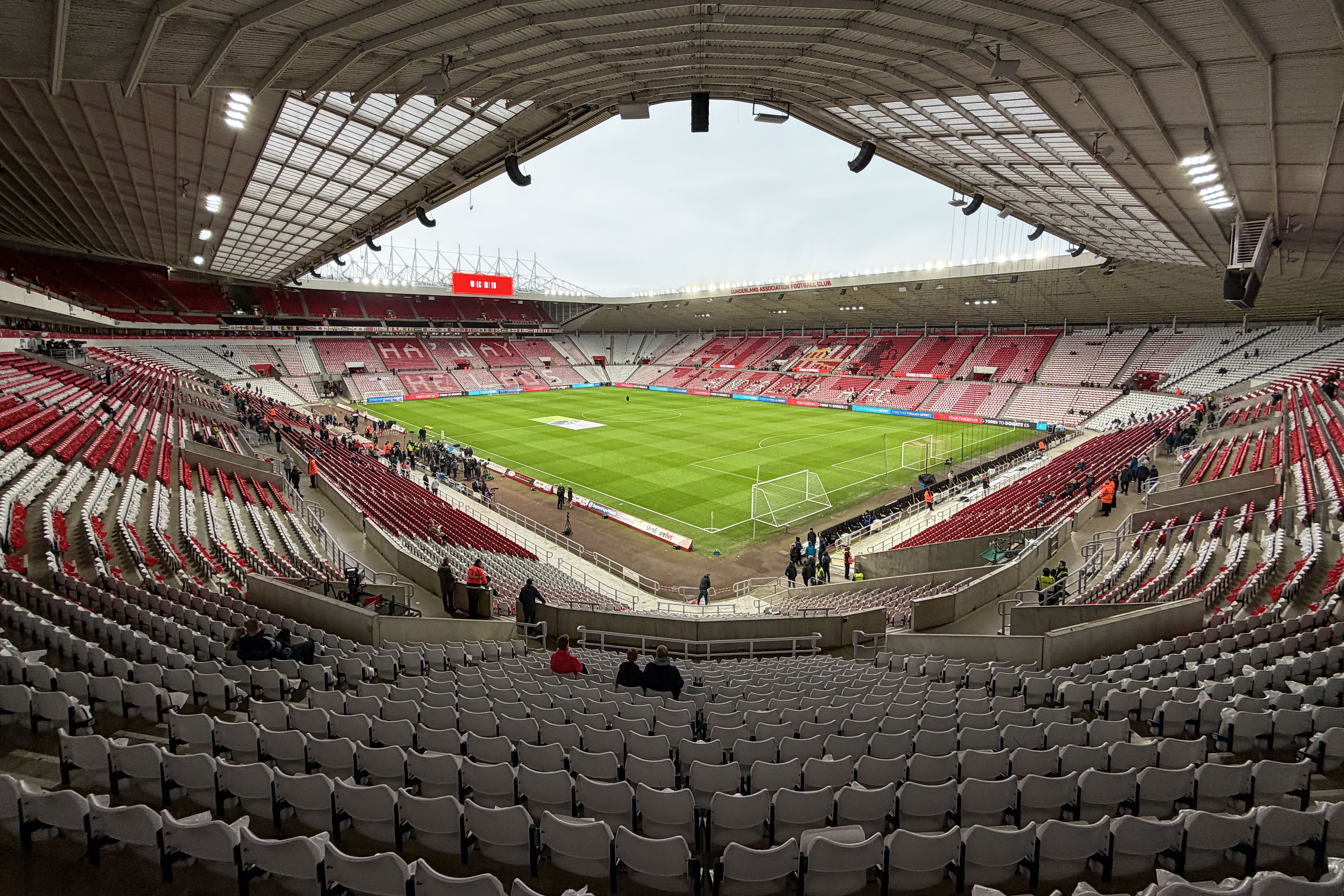
Interior of the stadium

The stadium was opened on 30 July 1997 by Prince Andrew, Duke of York (later Andrew Mountbatten-Windsor), with bands such as Status Quo, Upside Down and Kavana playing. To celebrate the opening of the stadium, Sunderland played a friendly against the Dutch side Ajax, which ended in a 0–0 draw.

The move did not happen without criticism. Famous actor and Sunderland supporter, often named in the media "Sunderland's most famous supporter", Peter O'Toole, said he wasn't as much a fan as he used to be since the team left Roker Park. Playwright Tom Kelly and actor Paul Dunn created a one-man play called I Left My Heart at Roker Park about a fan struggling with the move and what Roker Park meant for him; the play originally ran in 1997, and has had a few revivals since.

The North Stand was extended in 2000 to bring the capacity to 49,000, costing the club a further £7 million, making the final cost of the stadium £23 million. On 18 July 2006, a statue of 1973 FA Cup Final winning manager Bob Stokoe was unveiled outside the stadium. At the end of season Football League awards, the Stadium of Light was named the Best Away Ground, with other contenders including Crewe Alexandra's Alexandra Stadium and Plymouth Argyle's Home Park. Sunderland celebrated the tenth anniversary of the stadium with a pre-season friendly against Juventus on 6 August 2007; the game was drawn 1–1.

== Name ==
During construction, the stadium had not adopted an official name, and had been known colloquially as the "Wearside Stadium" and "New Roker Park".

The name was eventually revealed as the Stadium of Light at a naming ceremony on 30 July 1997, hours before the opening game against Ajax (0-0). Speaking at the naming event, Bob Murray explained the inspiration for the name came from the Coal mining heritage of the region and the stadium's Monkwearmouth Colliery site:

"For many years, miners at Wearmouth Colliery carried with them a Davy lamp as part of their working lives. Reflecting this tradition, the name allows the image of this light to shine forever."

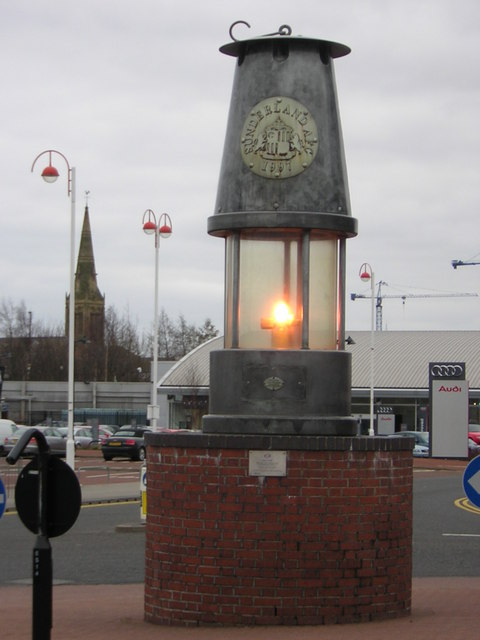
Davy Lamp outside of the Stadium of Light

To emphasise the fact, a statue of a miner's Davy lamp was located in front of the stadium's ticket office, adjacent to the stadium. The stadium name had been associated with the area since 1970 when it appeared in a Monty Python's Flying Circus episode "Literary Football", which was hosted by a native of South Shields, Eric Idle.

The name initially drew mixed reactions from Sunderland fans, with many unhappy that the name was already associated with the home ground of Benfica. A film crew for the Premier Passions documentary series recorded the moment that Bob Murray faced Sunderland fans immediately after the naming, with many expressing their disappointment. The similarity to the name of Benfica's home, Estádio da Luz, often anglicised to The Stadium of Light, has led to some visiting fans and reporters to erroneously assume that Sunderland's home was named after the Portuguese stadium. Murray responded directly to this in a 2017 interview with the Evening Chronicle, in which he said:

"The Estadio de Luz in Portugal isn’t the Stadium of Light, it is named after the area – Luz. It’s like, say, Elland Road or Old Trafford. We are the only club whose stadium has that name, and it was because of the history of the region that I named it".

In the same interview, Murray revealed that, shortly after the stadium opened, he was approached by a representative of the Labour government, asking if he would consider renaming the stadium after Diana, Princess of Wales, who died in September 1997. Murray refused the request, as he believed the stadium should be named in honour of those in the region who had worked in darkness.

The 'Of Light' suffix became a recognisable part of the Sunderland brand, and was used in a number of other areas related to the club; the Academy of Light is the club's training facility and youth academy, the Foundation of Light is a registered charity affiliated with the club and the Beacon of Light is a sports and education centre, owned by the Foundation, which is adjacent to the stadium. The club's official magazine was called Legion of Light before it was discontinued in January 2017.

In March 2010, Sunderland Chairman Niall Quinn announced the club were considering plans to sell naming rights to the stadium as a new way to boost income. The plans were shelved shortly after. The possibility of selling the naming rights was floated again by chief executive Margaret Byrne in 2013. Discussing the options of selling the stadium name in October 2018, chairman Stewart Donald said:

"I think the fans should have a say on whether they are comfortable with it. My gut feel is that even if we didn't consult with them, the vibe I get is that they aren't particularly attached to the name of the stadium. It's not a sacred thing like some of the other grounds."

== Structure and facilities ==
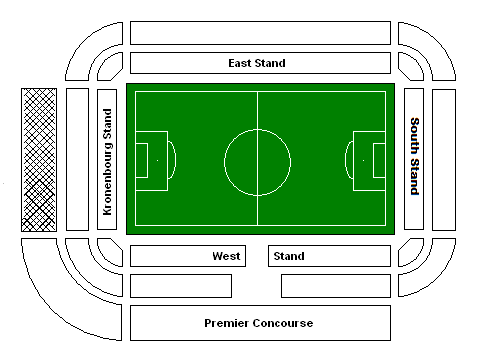
A plan of the layout of The Stadium of Light. The shaded area indicates the section designated for away fans.

The stadium is in the shape of a square bowl, and is separated into the Jimmy Montgomery Stand (West Stand), North Stand, East Stand and the Roker End (South Stand). The stands have all formerly had commercial names as part of sponsorship deals, e.g. the Vaux Stand (West), the Carling Stand (North), Fosters Stand (East) and the Metro FM Stand (South). The South Stand was renamed to the Roker End in December 2018, following a poll organised by the Red & White Army supporters club. The Roker End was the name of the stand behind the goal at the southern end Sunderland's former ground, Roker Park.

The West Stand includes the Premier Concourse which is the name of the upper tier and a number of executive boxes. The North Stand also includes an upper tier, formerly branded the Strongbow Upper, which contained the exterior seating for the Black Cats Bar, an enhanced match-day experience with padded seating and an exclusive catering facilities and bar. When the away fans were relocated in 2012, the Black Cats Bar seating was relocated to the rear of the North Stand lower tier.

Within the stadium is a concourse, housing the turnstiles, emergency exits, food kiosks, bars and toilet facilities. The concourse allows uninterrupted spectator access throughout the inner stadium bowl, with the exception being a gap between the South Stand and the South West corner. The concourse is linked to the seating bowl via a series of access ramps. The South East corner of the stadium is designated as the Family Zone, and has family-oriented branding within the concourse, as well as entertainment such as PlayStation 4 consoles.

Away fans were seated in the west half of the South Stand when the ground opened in 1997, but in November 2011, the club announced that the away supporters' section would be moved from the South Stand to the North Stand Upper from the beginning of the 2012–13 season.

The pitch is several metres below the level of the ground outside the stadium. The pitch uses a lighting system from Stadium Grow Lighting to ensure the grass can grow at any time of year. The device controls various aspects of the pitch, including exposure to light, temperature, water, and air, to make the grass able to grow in any conditions.

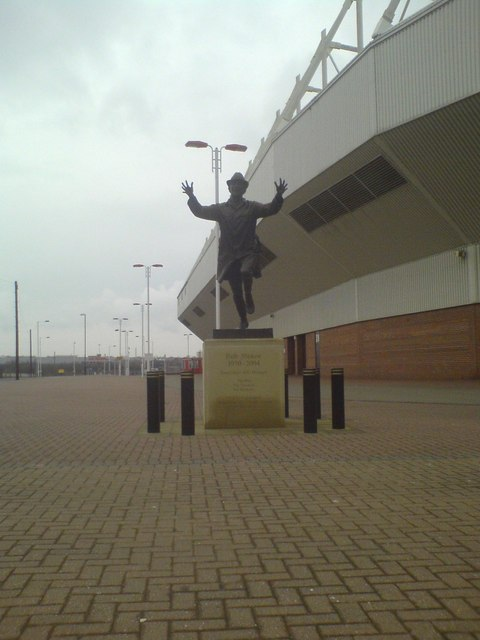
Statue of former Sunderland manager Bob Stokoe (1930–2004) outside the South East corner of the Stadium

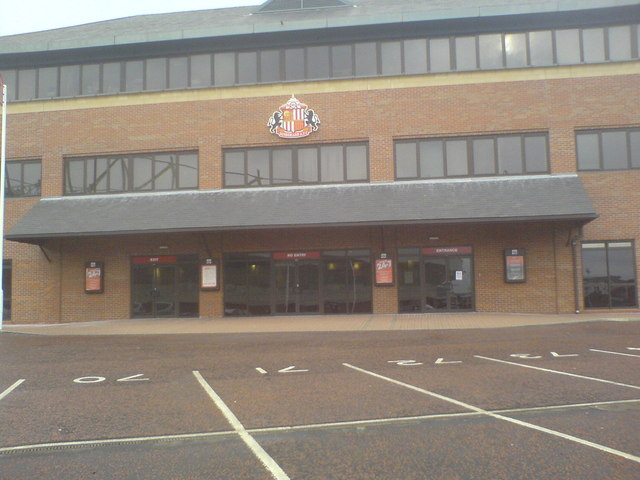
Black Cat House - originally used as a ticket office but later turned into the SAFC club store.

To the North East of the stadium stands the Black Cat House, a separate building which was the location of the Box office and club administrative offices, but became the club merchandise store in 2024, with the ticket office transferring to a unit in the East Stand. There is a large car park behind the West Stand and two car parks behind the East Stand, but match-day parking is permit only. Fragments of the iconic Archibald Leitch latticework, taken from the Main Stand at Roker Park, is used to separate parts of the Western Car Park. Wooden boards mimicking the Leitch lattice work were also added to the Roker End in 2019 as part of an initiative by the Red & White Army supporters group to bring a sense of identity to renamed stand.

The perimeter walls of the stadium incorporate a "Wall of Fame" feature, where names can be engraved into the bricks of the walls. The interior of the stadium holds a banqueting suite, which can seat from 460 to 600 people. The stadium also contains several conferencing suites, that can be hired for events. Quinn's Bar, housed in the West Stand, was named after former player and chairman Niall Quinn and includes memorabilia from the club's history. Originally it was available for non-match-day visitors, but has since become exclusive for match-day hospitality and event packages.

In 2004, the Centre for Light was opened by the SAFC Foundation within the Stadium. The £1.6m learning facility, built over multiple floors, included five learning areas supporting up to 120 visiting children per day. In 2015, Sunderland became the first football club in the world to open a sensory room within the Stadium - thereby allowing people on the Autism spectrum to watch matches in a sound-proofed environment. It was named the Nathan Shippey Sensory Room after Nathan's parents petitioned the club to set the room up. The sensory room provided a huge success, with the model being adopted at other clubs around the world. Sunderland opened their second sensory room in 2018.

In March 2018, it was announced that after the relegation to EFL League One, the Premier Concourse would be closed during the 2018–19 season, although it was temporarily reopened to accommodate a large crowd for the Boxing Day game against Bradford City and again on the final home league game against Portsmouth. After promotion back to EFL Championship, the Premier Concourse permanently reopened.

=== Seats ===
The stadium originally had mainly red seats, except for a Sunderland emblem and the words "SUNDERLAND A.F.C" in white lettering on the East Stand, and the slogan "HA'WAY THE LADS" ("Ha'way" is a Mackem dialect equivalent of the Geordie word "Howay", meaning "Come on") in white lettering on the North Stand. A thin band of white seats also circled the top of the East and South stand.

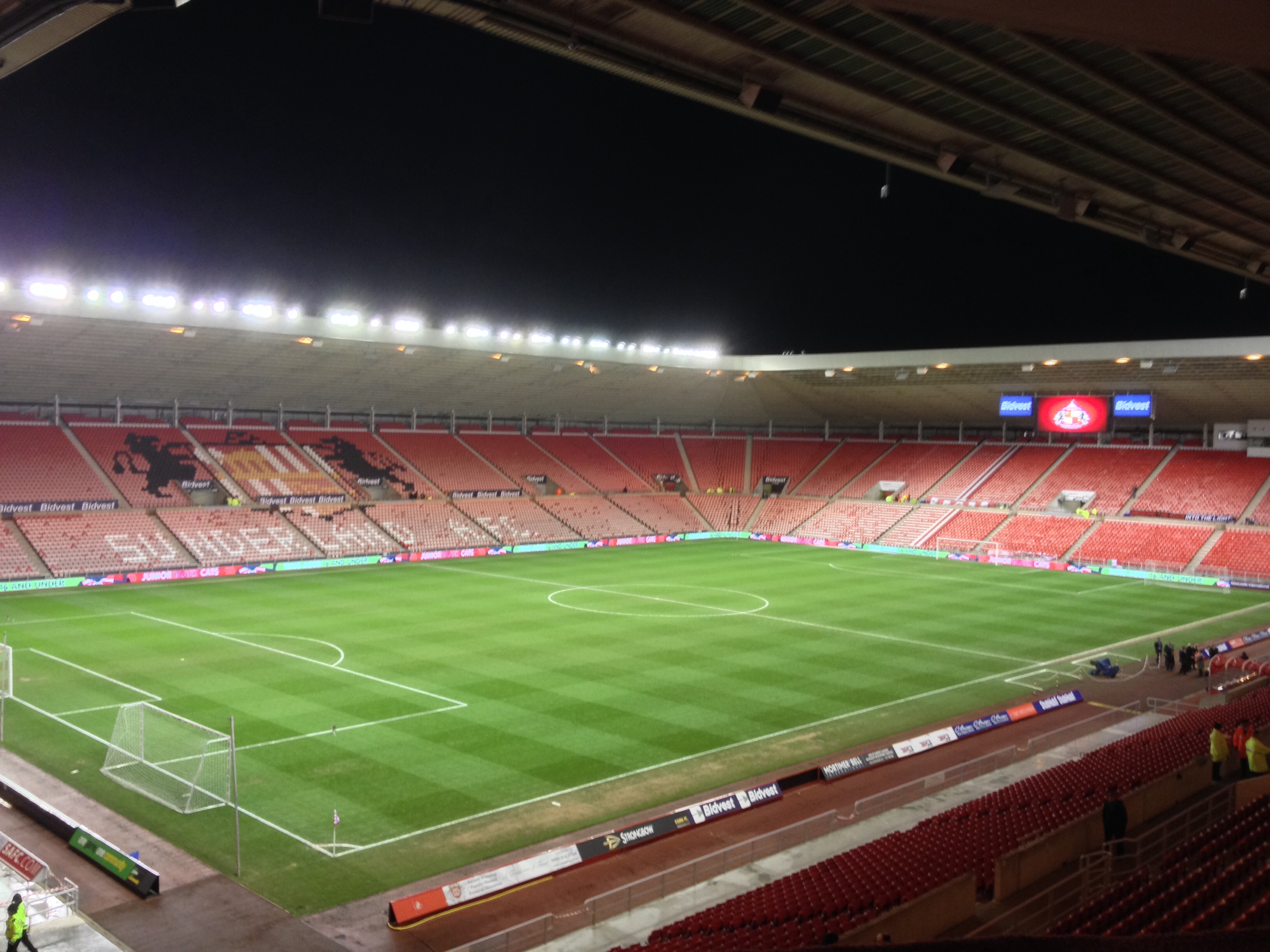
East Stand of the stadium on the left

Over time, sections of red seats become bleached by the sun, turning them pink - which became a source of mockery from opposing fans. Sunderland fans petitioned the club to replace the seats, even noting on the inclusion of the faded pink seats in the digital replica of the Stadium of Light in the FIFA video game. In 2016, the club announced that a programme of seat changes would take place as part of a face-lift for the stadium's 20th anniversary. Sections of the East Stand were replaced, but further work stalled.

When Stewart Donald purchased the club in the summer of 2018, frustration over the pink seats (and the general state of the stadium) came up frequently in his early engagements with fans. In June, Donald announced that he had purchased 31,500 seats and requested Sunderland fans to volunteer to help change them. The seat change took place in phases, with hundreds of volunteering fans joined occasionally by club officials and players. Phase I was the South East corner and was completed on 19 July 2018, Phase II was the North East corner and North Stand on was completed on 15 September 2018, and Phase III the South West corner completed in October 2018. The fourth and final phase, replacing 10,000 seats in the South and West stands, began on 29 October 2018. The corners were replaced with white seats, while the sides and ends were left red. The emblem and lettering remained. The club were nominated as a finalist in 'Best Club Marketing Initiative' category at the 2018 Business Football Awards for the seat change activity.

== Fan Zone ==
A 6,000 capacity Fan Zone, modelled on similar schemes at Manchester City and those at NFL games in the United States, was approved by Sunderland City Council in July 2015. It followed a successful trial prior to a game against West Ham United in January 2013.

It was opened on the first home game of the 2015–16 season. The zone was located in the car park outside the East Stand and South East corner, and included live music, children's activities (including a Five-a-side football pitch), food and drink kiosks and on-stage interviews with club legends. The Fan Zone opened three hours before kick-off and for a few hours after the game, and was accessible to ticket-holding spectators, including away fans. Due to the temporary structures in use, the Fan Zone was closed for safety reasons during periods of high winds. An enhanced version of the Fan Zone was opened for the England senior international game vs Australia in 2016.

The Fan Zone re-opened for the 2016–17 season opener against Middlesbrough, but as the season progressed, poor performance on the field and financial troubles off the field led to the Fan Zone being cancelled.

In a Q&A with supporters association 'Red & White Army', new club owner Stewart Donald committed to bring back the Fan Zone. It returned for the opening game of the 2018–19 season against Charlton Athletic, although smaller than the 2015 version, it was open to anyone - not just ticket-holding spectators. The Fan Zone no longer re-opens after a game.

== Stadium Village ==
A 30 hectare site area around the Stadium, including the Sheepfolds Industrial estate, was designated as the 'Stadium Village' development zone by Sunderland City Council in 2007 - and a draft Supplementary planning document was released in 2009. The plan, adopted in 2010, described a framework for redeveloping the Stadium Village area into a mixture of commercial, residential and entertainment facilities with a focus on health and well-being. The plan was consistent with wider redevelopment plans across Sunderland, then under the umbrella of Sunderland Arc agency. In preparation for the redevelopment plans, the council began buying up plots in the area in 2008.

Initial redevelopment work focused on the Northern end of the site, adjacent to the stadium's North Stand and the Black Cat House ticket office. The buildings in this area have Stadium Park as their address. The Sunderland Aquatic Centre, including an Olympic-sized swimming pool and fitness centre, opened in April 2008. In December 2014 construction work began on a new 141-room Hilton Garden Inn which opened on 28 April 2016. The Beacon of Light, a sports, education and community centre, opened in the summer of 2018 alongside the Aquatic Centre.

In 2009, during a review of the Stadium Village plans, city councilors expressed ambitions to build an Indoor skiing facility on the site and an expression of interest was issued to potential developers.

In the spring of 2011, the Sunderland Arc redevelopment agency was shut down, after its funding was pulled due to austerity cuts. This put the long-term future of the Stadium Village plan in doubt. However the council partnered with IDPartnership Group to push ahead with the plan, and in September 2017, a 'masterplan' for Phase II of the Stadium Village area was approved by Sunderland council and released for public consultation. The Phase II area covers an area to the South and East of the stadium and proposals included facilities such as a Velodrome, an Ice rink, a Conference centre and a Climbing wall.

A key part of the new masterplan is Stadium Way, a proposed tree-lined boulevard linking the St Peter's Metro station with a proposed Plaza at the South East corner of the stadium. The plaza would incorporate an enhanced Fan Zone, and is modelled on a similar space being developed as part of the Tottenham Hotspur Stadium in London.

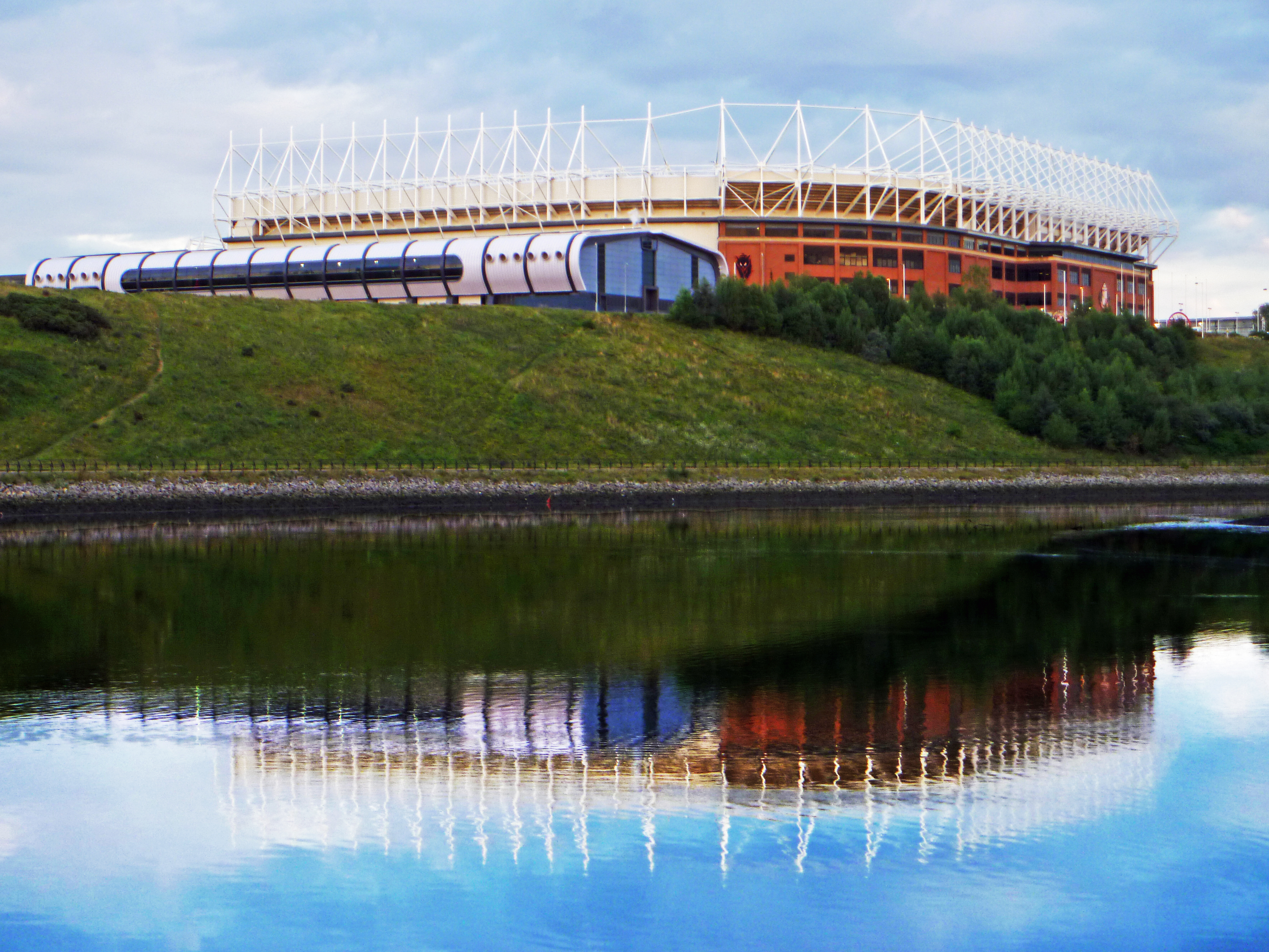
Exterior view of Stadium above the River Wear

== International matches ==
As well as holding Sunderland games, the stadium has also hosted England matches. The stadium was one of several venues used as temporary home grounds for the England team while the redevelopment of Wembley Stadium took place. It hosted its first England game in 1999, when they played Belgium in a friendly match, which England won 2–1. It played host to its first competitive England match on 2 April 2003, when they played Turkey in a Euro 2004 qualifying match, which England won 2–0. The Stadium of Light also held an England under 20 match against Italy on 27 November 2002, Italy beat England 5–3. On 10 June 2003 it hosted an England's under-21s 2004 U21 European Championship qualifier match against Slovakia's under-21s. The hosts beat the visitors 2–0 through Peter Doležaj's fortieth minute own goal and Phil Jagielka's eighty third-minute goal with 11,223 in attendance.

On 4 March 2016 it was announced that the Stadium of Light would host England for a friendly against Australia on 27 May 2016 as part of their preparations for Euro 2016. The sold-out match finished in a 2–1 victory for England, with goals from Marcus Rashford (on his international debut), Wayne Rooney and an own goal from Eric Dier.

On 30 September 2021, it was announced that the Stadium would host its first women's football international; an England 2023 World Cup qualifier against Austria on 27 November 2021.

International matches played at the Stadium of Light
Date	Team #1	Result	Team #2	Competition	Attendance	Ref.
10 October 1999	England	2–1	Belgium	Friendly	40,897	
16 July 2000	England	1–2	Brazil	Nationwide Under 16 International Tournament	21,061	
27 November 2002	England	3–5	Italy	U20 Four Nations Tournament	6,544	
2 April 2003	England	2–0	Turkey	UEFA Euro 2004 qualifying	47,667	
10 June 2003	England	2–0	Slovakia	2004 UEFA European Under-21 Championship qualification	11,223	
27 May 2016	England	2–1	Australia	Friendly	46,595	
27 November 2021	England	1–0	Austria	2023 FIFA Women's World Cup qualification	9,159	
22 September 2023	England	2–1	Scotland	2023–24 UEFA Women's Nations League	41,947	

== Other uses ==
=== Other Football ===
The Stadium of Light has hosted the final of the Durham Challenge Cup three times; in 2008, 2019. and 2023. It was due to host the 2020 final, but this was cancelled due to COVID-19. The Stadium of Light has also played host to finals for youth football, including the U14 Premier League Cup Final in 2014. It will host the 2026 final.

=== Rugby union ===
In August 2023, the stadium was confirmed as one of eight host venues for the women's 2025 Women's Rugby World Cup. In December 2023, it was confirmed that the stadium would host the tournament's opening game.

Rugby union matches played at the Stadium of Light
Date	Country	Score	Country	Use	Attendance	Ref
22 August 2025	England	69–7	United States	2025 Women's Rugby World Cup pool stage	42,723	
17 April 2027	England	vs.	Scotland	2027 Women's Six Nations Championship		

=== Concerts ===
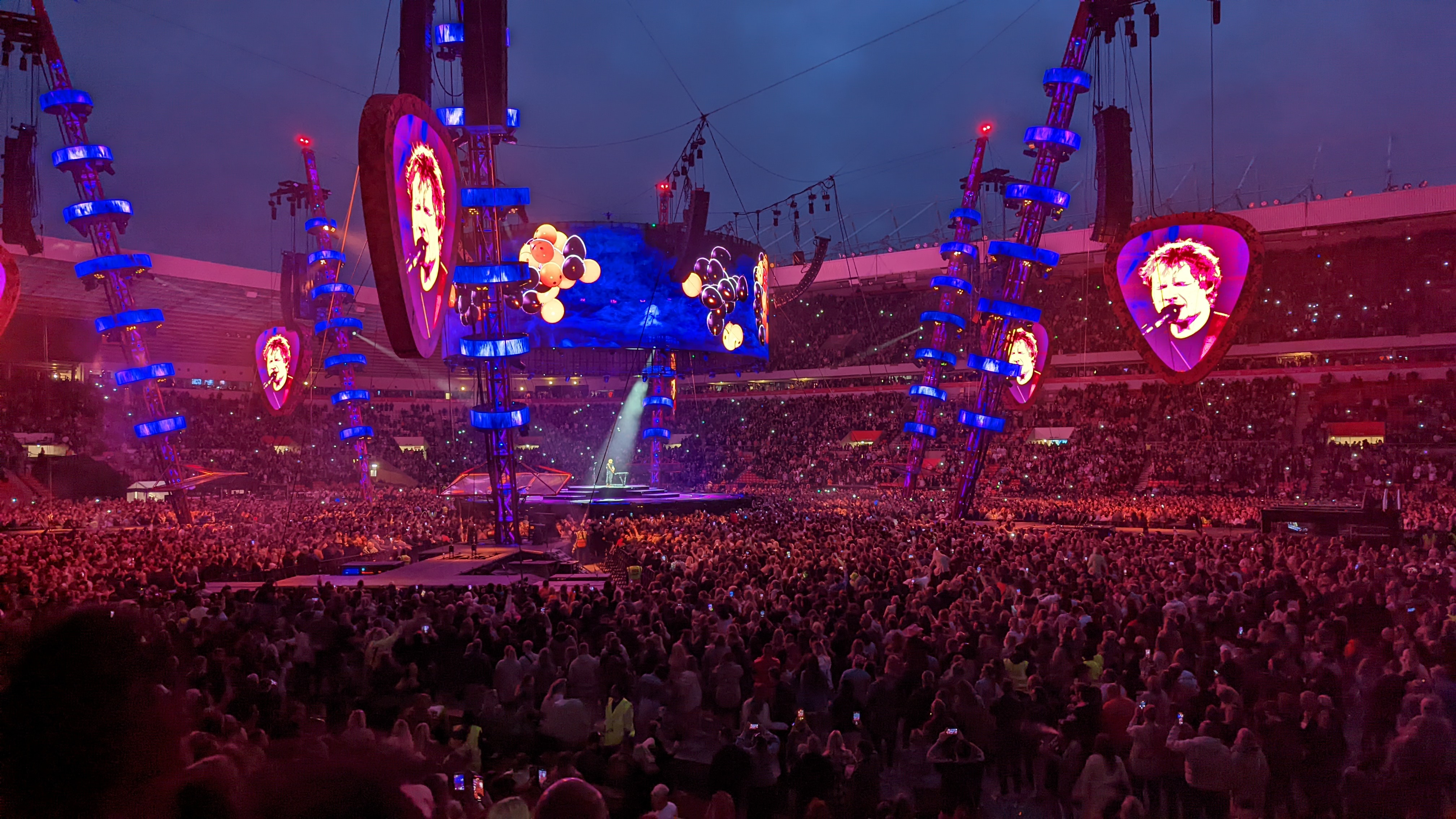
Ed Sheeran's +−=÷× Tour, Stadium of Light, Sunderland, 2022

Concerts at the Stadium of Light
Date	Artist	Tour	Attendance	Revenue
5 June 2009	Take That	Take That Present: The Circus Live	—	—
6 June 2009	Take That	Take That Present: The Circus Live	—	—
10 June 2009	Oasis	Dig Out Your Soul Tour	—	—
27 May 2011	Take That	Progress Live	206,334 / 206,334	$21,600,077
28 May 2011	Take That	Progress Live	206,334 / 206,334	$21,600,077
30 May 2011	Take That	Progress Live	206,334 / 206,334	$21,600,077
31 May 2011	Take That	Progress Live	206,334 / 206,334	$21,600,077
11 June 2010	Pink	The Funhouse Summer Carnival Tour	—	—
17 June 2011	Kings of Leon	Come Around Sundown World Tour	—	—
7 June 2012	Coldplay	Mylo Xyloto Tour	55,220 / 55,220	$4,331,891
21 June 2012	Bruce Springsteen and the E-Street Band	Wrecking Ball World Tour	41,564 / 52,900	$3,693,333
24 June 2012	Red Hot Chili Peppers	I'm with You World Tour	—	—
13 June 2013	Bon Jovi	Because We Can Tour	41,649 / 41,649	$2,612,563
20 June 2013	Rihanna	Diamonds World Tour	54,259 / 54,259	$4,413,716
28 May 2014	One Direction	Where We Are Tour	51,231 / 51,231	$4,383,490
25 May 2015	Foo Fighters	Sonic Highways World Tour	40,000	—
28 June 2016	Beyoncé	The Formation World Tour	48,952 / 48,952	$4,996,960
6 June 2019	Spice Girls	Spice World – 2019 Tour	45,429 / 45,429	$4,512,900
3 June 2022	Ed Sheeran	+−=÷× Tour	106,641 / 106,641	$8,887,711
4 June 2022	Ed Sheeran	+−=÷× Tour	106,641 / 106,641	$8,887,711
19 June 2022	Elton John	Farewell Yellow Brick Road	33,771 / 33,771	$4,609,018
23 May 2023	Beyoncé	Renaissance World Tour	44,790 / 44,790	$6,727,118
10 June 2023	P!nk	Summer Carnival	96,650 / 96,650	$11,832,455
11 June 2023	P!nk	Summer Carnival	96,650 / 96,650	$11,832,455
22 May 2024	Bruce Springsteen and the E Street Band	2024 World Tour	45,775	
4 July 2024	Scouting for Girls	Stadium of Light Summer Sessions	—	—
9 June 2026	Take That	The Circus Live – Summer 2026	—	—

=== University of Sunderland ===
The Stadium of Light hosted the University of Sunderland's graduation ceremonies for 21 years, following their relocation to the venue in 2004. The university held graduation ceremonies at the stadium twice a year during this period.

The stadium won the RSVP magazine's Most creative use of a sporting venue award in 2007 for its usage as the university's graduation site.

In January 2026, the university moved its graduation ceremonies to The Fire Station in Sunderland city centre. The first ceremonies at the new venue took place between 12 and 16 January 2026.

== Records ==
=== Attendances ===
The highest football attendance at the Stadium of Light is 48,353 set on 13 April 2002 for a Premier League game between Sunderland and Liverpool. The Stadium attendance record for non-football is 60,000 on 3 June 2022 for an Ed Sheeran concert.

The lowest league attendance at the stadium was 22,167 against Wigan Athletic on 2 December 2003. The lowest recorded attendance for a first-team competitive game at the Stadium of Light was 3,498 vs Oldham Athletic in the EFL Trophy Second Round on 1 December 2021. A dead rubber game vs. Bradford City in the same tournament on 9 November 2021 did not have an officially recorded attendance.

The highest seasonal average at the stadium since it was opened was 46,790 in the 2000–01 season while Sunderland were playing in the Premier League. The lowest average attendance at the Stadium of Light was 27,119 in the 2003–04 season in Division One. The highest total seasonal attendance was recorded during the 1998–99 season when the aggregate was 890,660 in a season where Sunderland were First Division champions, and League Cup semi-finalists. The lowest seasonal aggregate at the Stadium of Light was 572,241 in the 2019–20 season, as Sunderland played only 19 of a planned 23 games due to the season's curtailment because of the COVID-19 pandemic. The following season saw all games played behind closed doors due to the pandemic.

In the 2018-19 season, Sunderland averaged a home league crowd of 32,156, setting a new record for the third tier, while the Boxing Day game against Bradford City attracted 46,039, both a League One record, and the highest attended league game outside of the Premier League that season.

On 13 October 2024, Sunderland Women and Newcastle Women set a new attendance record of 15,387 for the Women's Championship in their first meeting in the league, a Wear–Tyne derby match played at the stadium. The previous record had been an attendance of 11,137, set in 2022.

=== Results ===
Sunderland's largest margin of victory at the stadium was a 7–0 win over Oxford United in Division 1 during the 1998–99 promotion season.

Sunderland's biggest defeat at the Stadium of Light was 5-0 in a Premier League match against Nottingham Forest on 24th April 2026. Before that, it was also 5–0 in a preseason friendly (marking the 20th anniversary of the stadium) against Celtic on 29 July 2017. Prior to 2026, Sunderland's biggest league defeat at the Stadium of Light is 4–0 which has happened on five occasions: vs. Arsenal (11 May 2003), vs. Manchester United (26 December 2007), vs. Aston Villa (14 March 2015), vs. Southampton (11 February 2017) and vs. Middlesbrough (7 October 2023).

The highest scoring matches at the Stadium of Light with nine goals are a 6–3 Sunderland victory over Exeter City in Round 2 of the EFL Cup on 25 August 2015, and a 5–4 Sunderland defeat to Coventry City in League One on 13 April 2019.

== Transport ==
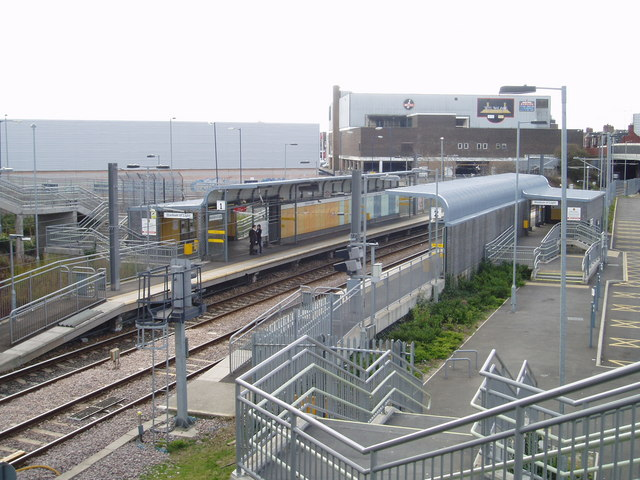
The Stadium of Light Tyne Wear Metro station

Sunderland railway station is connected to London King's Cross by occasional direct services run by the Open Access operator Grand Central. The station is near the stadium. The St Peter's and Stadium of Light Metro stations were built as part of the Sunderland extension. Both are quite near the stadium, though ironically St. Peter's is nearer to the stadium than the Stadium of Light station. The Metro was extended into Sunderland in 2002. A park and ride system is available on match days to allow spectators to park away from the stadium, and a new footbridge has been built to link the stadium to the south bank of the river as part of the stadium park regeneration project.
