= Tom Cowie =

Life President of the Arriva Group (1922 – 2012)

Sir Tom Cowie
- Born: 9 September 1922; Sunderland, County Durham, England
- Died: 18 January 2012 (aged 89); Sunderland, Tyne and Wear, England
- Spouse: Diane Cowie

Sir Thomas Cowie OBE (9 September 1922 – 18 January 2012) was an English businessman who was the honorary Life President of the Arriva Group, formerly known as Cowie Group plc.

== Career ==
=== Cowie Group ===
Cowie's father, Thomas Stephenson Knowles Cowie, headed a business, T. Cowie Ltd, which repaired and sold cycles in Matamba Terrace, Sunderland. This business ceased trading in the early years of the Second World War when T.S.K. Cowie went into the trawler business. Cowie was born on 9 September 1922 in Sunderland. After serving in the Royal Air Force, he returned to Sunderland after the war and in 1948 T Cowie Ltd, motorcycle dealers, re-opened for business.

A string of takeovers led to the business's rapid expansion and by 1961 it had showrooms in seven cities. It became a public limited company in 1964 having moved into car sales following the collapse of the motorbike market. In 1972 Cowie Contract Hire was formed. By the end of the 1980s this was largest contract hire company in the United Kingdom.

T. Cowie plc moved into bus operation in 1980 by taking over Grey-Green. Under Cowie ownership it expanded into London Transport tendered services, and its profits increased massively as a result. Cowie acquired bus sales dealership Hughes DAF in 1988, before attempting to purchase bus manufacturer Plaxton in 1992. The bid was unsuccessful, with Cowie taking only 47% of the company's shares by the deadline.

In 1993 Cowie left T. Cowie plc following differences of opinion with other board members, although he remained its life president and retained a 2.8% shareholding. It was renamed Arriva in 1998.

=== Sunderland A.F.C. ===
From 1980 to 1986, Cowie was Chairman of Sunderland A.F.C., which he supported, but his tenure remains, in the eyes of most supporters, a real low in the club's history. His appointment of Lawrie McMenemy as manager in 1985 culminated in their relegation to the Football League Third Division. Bob Murray replaced Cowie as chairman in 1986.

=== Later activities ===
In September 2002, the University of Sunderland renamed its St Peter's Campus the "Sir Tom Cowie Campus at St Peter's", after the local businessman who was one of its primary supporters.

He also opened a computer suite in Southmoor school on 4 December 2004.

In 2005 Cowie opened a business and enterprise centre in Thornhill School, Sunderland. He sponsored the renovating and fitting of the building. In 2007 Cowie helped refurbish a sixth form centre at St. Bede's School in Lanchester.

Cowie was a prominent donor to the Conservative Party. For many years, he was president of Sunderland Conservative Association. He donated £630,000 between 2001 and 2007, but vowed to cease his donations following dissatisfaction with what he referred to as David Cameron's "arrogant, Old Etonian" style of leadership.

Cowie died at the age of 89 on 18 January 2012.

== Honours ==
Cowie was appointed an Office of the Order of the British Empire in 1982 and a knight bachelor in the 1992 New Year Honours.
