= Ellis Short =

American businessman (born 1960)

- Born: October 6, 1960 (age 65); Independence, Missouri, US
- Citizenship: American, Irish
- Education: Missouri University of Science and Technology (1983)
- Occupation: Owner of Kildare Partners
- Spouse: Eve Zimmerman Short

Ellis Short (born October 6, 1960) is an American businessman and founder of Kildare Partners, a private equity fund investing in distressed European real estate assets. Short was also the owner and chairman of English football club Sunderland A.F.C. from September 2008 to April 2018.

== Early life ==
Ellis Short was born in Independence, Missouri to Patricia and Ellis Short III. and attended William Chrisman High School. He earned a degree in mechanical engineering at the Missouri University of Science and Technology in 1983.

== Career ==
After graduating, Short worked for General Electric beginning in 1983. In 1995, Short joined Lone Star Funds, a Dallas-based private equity firm, becoming president of the fund and heading its Asian operations. In 2003, Short paid £23 million for Skibo Castle, which operates as a members-only hotel and country club in Scotland. The castle is famous for hosting Madonna's wedding to Guy Ritchie in 2000.

In 2013, Short formed a new company, Kildare Partners, to invest in distressed property assets and non-performing debt.

=== Sunderland AFC ===
In September 2008, Short gained a controlling interest in Sunderland A.F.C. In December of that year, Short worked on completing a deal with the Drumaville Consortium for their remaining shares in the club. After the Sunderland A.F.C. ownership change, football manager Roy Keane left the club. Short assumed ownership of the club in May 2009. His purchase of the club made Sunderland the fourth club in the Premier League to have American owners, alongside Aston Villa, Manchester United and Liverpool.

In November 2011, Short sacked Steve Bruce after a poor run of results, which Short labelled 'not good enough'. Nine days later, Martin O'Neill was appointed Bruce's successor. O'Neill himself was succeeded by Italian ex-footballer Paolo Di Canio in 2013. Di Canio, in turn, was dismissed in September 2013 after a poor start to the Premier League season. Gus Poyet was put in charge of the first team and guided Sunderland to Premier League safety, but he was replaced late in the 2014–15 campaign by Dick Advocaat, who helped the team avoid relegation and secure its top-flight status for 2015–16. Advocaat's replacement, Sam Allardyce, left the club in July 2016 and was replaced by David Moyes, who in turn resigned after Sunderland finished last in the 2016–17 season and were relegated to the EFL Championship.

Simon Grayson was appointed manager in June 2017. After a dire run of results, Grayson was dismissed after a 3–3 home draw with fellow strugglers Bolton Wanderers. Ex-Wales manager, Chris Coleman was appointed as the new Sunderland manager on November 19, 2017. However, after Ellis decided to spend no money during the mid-season transfer window, Sunderland were relegated on April 21, 2018. Coleman was sacked and the club sold on April 29, 2018, to a consortium headed by Stewart Donald, chairman of Eastleigh F.C.

=== Property ===
He owns a property in the Kukio neighborhood on the Kona coast of Hawaii.

== Personal life ==
He is married to former tennis player Eve Zimmerman. In 2021, the Sunday Times Rich List estimated his net worth at £880 million. Short was a resident of London, England for many years but returned to the United States in 2017.
