= Bob Murray (businessman) =

English businessman (born 1946)

Sir Robert Sydney Murray CBE (born 3 August 1946) is a businessman and former chairman of Sunderland AFC. An accountant by trade, he made his fortune through the growth and sale of the Spring Ram kitchen manufacturing company.

== Sunderland AFC ==
Murray was born in Consett, County Durham. He became chairman of Sunderland AFC in 1986, replacing the motor magnate Sir Tom Cowie.

Murray's first season as chairman ended with the dismissal of manager Lawrie McMenemy and the club's relegation to the Third Division for the first time in their history. A revival saw Sunderland reach the First Division in 1990, only to be relegated after one season. They did not return to the top division until 1996, though they did reach the FA Cup final in 1992 and lost 2-0 to Liverpool.

By 1991, Murray was investigating the possibility of building a new stadium for Sunderland to replace the aging Roker Park; after plans to build a stadium near the Nissan car factory failed, he turned his attention to the former Monkwearmouth colliery site on the banks of the River Wear, which became available with the colliery's closure in December 1993. His funds went towards the new Stadium of Light, which opened on the Monkwearmouth colliery site in July 1997 with an all-seater capacity of more than 42,000 (which within a few years was increased to more than 48,000).

In seasons 1999/2000 and 2000/01 Sunderland finished seventh in the Premiership but Murray became unpopular when Sunderland were relegated in 2003 with a then record low of 19 points as well as debts of nearly £30 million. Promotion was gained two years later but Murray was criticised again as Sunderland endured a poor season back in the Premiership.

Sunderland had progressed well during the final 11 seasons of Murray's ownership. They never finished below third place in the league's second tier; whereas the club had finished below this position 7 times in Murray's first 9 seasons as chairman.

== Club takeover ==
Murray had stated that he was willing to sell his shares in the club if an investor demonstrated a willingness to invest considerable money in the club - not simply purchase his shares. In 2006, former player Niall Quinn made an offer for the club, backed by a consortium of Irish businessmen. In order to for this to proceed Murray resigned as chairman, enabling the Drumaville Consortium takeover to occur, although he remained on the board in the interim.

At a press conference on 28 June 2006 he confirmed that the club would be sold to Quinn's consortium for £10 million. Murray received £5.7 million of the total, although he has stated that the extensive negotiations were in order to ensure the bid was in the interests of the club and not, as speculated by the press, for his own financial gain. This assertion was supported by the relatively low price at which he allowed his controlling stake to be bought. On 3 July 2006, the Drumaville Consortium bid was officially confirmed and the offer of £10 million accepted, with Quinn having the unusual dual role of club Chairman and Acting Manager. Murray was appointed as the club's Life President by the new owners.

Murray was appointed Commander of the Order of the British Empire (CBE) in the 2003 New Year Honours, "for services to Sunderland Football Club and to the community"; he was knighted in the 2010 Birthday Honours "for services to Football and to Education in the North East."

== Leeds Beckett University ==
In October 2012, Murray was announced as the chancellor of Leeds Beckett University.
