= Stewart Donald =

English businessman and football administrator

Stewart Donald OBE
- Born: December 1974 (age 51)
- Occupations: Businessman and football administrator
- Known for: Majority shareholder of Eastleigh

Stewart Donald OBE is an English businessman and football administrator. Based in Witney, Oxfordshire, he is the chairman and majority shareholder of Eastleigh and former CEO of Bridle Insurance.

== Career ==
As of 2018, Donald has worked in the insurance industry "for more than 20 years". Donald and business partner Neil Fox have "acquired a string of companies". In April 2018, his net worth was an estimated £8.4 million.

On 3 September 2019, Donald sold Bridle Insurance to Finch Group.

== Football ==
=== Eastleigh ===
In February 2010, he bought Eastleigh in the Conference South. In May 2017, with the club now one division higher in the National League, he told the Southern Daily Echo that he would repeat his total investment of £10 million in the club in the aim of getting them into the English Football League. He developed a reputation for being careful with money, saying that he "hit the roof" because the club were giving free bottles of water to players who would only drink half; he saved the team £500 by stopping this.

In July 2015, Donald paid £500,000 to buy a 10% stake in Oxford United, the club he had supported his whole life and previously donated to. He did not become a member of the board due to conflict of interest relating to his role at Eastleigh.

=== Sunderland ===
In April 2018, Donald was chosen to be the leader of a consortium offering to purchase Sunderland, who were put up for sale by billionaire owner Ellis Short after a second successive relegation to League One. He agreed to sell Eastleigh so that he could own Sunderland. On 21 May, he officially became owner of Sunderland, doing so without the consortium to speed the transition.

On 31 December 2019, news broke that Donald was reportedly trying to sell the club after 19 months of ownership, due to backlash from fans. A week later, the board stated that it would look to sell the club because "long-term success cannot be achieved by a disunited club". In an interview with Talksport in April 2020, Donald stated that he was aware that he had made mistakes during his tenure as owner and that he understood the fans dissatisfaction. He also stated his intention to still remain a minority shareholder once the club had been sold.

In an interview with BBC Radio Newcastle on 17 July 2020, Donald publicly named his asking price to purchase the club to any interested parties. He denied accusations from supporters that he was "being awkward" over the sale of the club and reaffirmed that "I know fans want me out and I'm desperately trying to get out". One day later, he stepped down as chairman of the club, while remaining owner.

On 24 December 2020, Sunderland confirmed that they had reached an agreement with prospective buyer Kyril Louis-Dreyfus – the 22-year-old son of former Marseille owner Robert Louis-Dreyfus – for him to purchase a controlling stake in the club, subject to EFL approval. Approval was granted on 18 February 2021 and Louis-Dreyfus became chairman and controlling shareholder, with Donald, Methven and Sartori remaining as fellow shareholders. On 27 May 2023, Donald sold his remaining shares in the club, ending his involvement in the club.

=== Return to Eastleigh ===
On 27 April 2023, Donald agreed to purchase a controlling stake in Eastleigh, five years after he had sold the club initially.

== Personal life ==
Donald is married, and lives in Witney, Oxfordshire.
