= The Long Shadow (TV series) =

2023 British true crime drama series

- Promotional poster
- Genre: True crime drama
- Based on: Wicked Beyond Belief by Michael Bilton
- Written by: George Kay
- Directed by: Lewis Arnold
- Starring: Toby Jones; David Morrissey; Daniel Mays; Katherine Kelly
- Composer: Sarah Warne
- Country of origin: United Kingdom
- Original language: English
- No. of episodes: 7

Production
- Executive producers: Elaine Pyke; George Kay; Lewis Arnold; Willow Grylls
- Producer: Matt Sanford
- Production locations: Versa Studios, Leeds, United Kingdom
- Production companies: New Pictures; Sundance Now; All3Media

Original release
- Network: ITV
- Release: 25 September – 6 November 2023

The Long Shadow is a seven-part British true crime drama television series, written by George Kay and directed by Lewis Arnold. The series details the five-year manhunt for the serial killer Peter Sutcliffe, commonly referred to as the Yorkshire Ripper. The series began airing on ITV1 on 25 September and concluded on 6 November 2023.

== Cast ==
- Toby Jones as DCS Dennis Hoban
- David Morrissey as ACC George Oldfield
- Daniel Mays as Sydney Jackson
- Katherine Kelly as Emily Jackson
- Jack Deam as DI Les Hanley
- Chloe Harris as WPC Jenny Bush
- Kris Hitchen as DC John Nunn
- Lee Ingleby as DSI (later DCS) Jim Hobson
- Michael McElhatton as CC Ronald Gregory
- Steven Waddington as DSI Dick Holland
- Liam Garrigan as PS Bob Blake
- Jasmine Lee-Jones as Marcella Claxton
- Dorothy Atkinson as Betty Hoban
- Sorcha Groundsell as Nicola Briggs
- John Henshaw as Mike Dugdale
- Stephen Tompkinson as David Gee
- Christopher Hatherall as DCS John Domaille
- Shaun Thomas as Neil Jackson
- James Clay as Ken Dwyer
- Marcus Fraser as Calvin Thompson
- Charlotte Tyree as Caroline Armstrong
- Charley Webb as WPC Anna Lawson
- Vicky Myers as WPC Sue Neave
- Kate Rutter as Irene MacDonald
- Liz White as WPS Meg Winterburn
- Emma Cunniffe as Margaret Oldfield
- Adam Long as DC Andrew Laptew
- Paul Brennen as Jack Hill
- Colin R. Campbell as Harry Smelt
- Alexa Davies as Ruth Bundey
- Jill Halfpenny as Doreen Hill
- Nicola Stephenson as Olive Smelt
- Emma Williams as WPC June Sinclair
- Mark Stobbart as Peter Sutcliffe
- Daisy Plaxton as Elizabeth Jackson
- Max Richardson as Graham Jackson
- Kris Mochrie as PC Ian Rudge
- Roger Ringrose as Wilf MacDonald
- Luke Roskell as PC Greg Clitheroe
- Clare Burt as Maureen Long
- Robert James-Collier as DCS Jack Ridgeway
- Melissa Parker as Linda Arrowcraft
- Stevie Raine as DI David Zackrisson
- Daisy Waterstone as Jacqueline Hill
- Jamie Parker as Commander Jim Nevill
- Leah Walker as Olivia Reivers
- Sammy Winward as Sonia Sutcliffe
- Adam James as Desmond Wilcox
- Julian Kay as Dylan Parker

== Episodes ==
No.	Directed by	Written by	Original release date	Viewers (millions)
1	Lewis Arnold	George Kay	25 September 2023	4.31
The police struggle to find the murderer of a woman in Leeds and a married mother has to make a difficult decision. Guest cast: Ben Cartwright as Michael Baxter, Alexa Goodall as Sonia McCann, Dylan Hall as Richard McCann, Katherine Kelly as Emily Jackson, Brian McCardie as Steve Rawton, Gemma Laurie as Wilma McCann, Michael Parr as Paul Hughes, Rebecca Hanssen as Pat Jackson, Melanie Kilburn as Auntie Win, Joe Hughes as Eddie Brown
2	Lewis Arnold	George Kay	2 October 2023	4.90
The police have arrested who they think is the murderer but find that the murders have continued. As they face the fact that there could be more than one killer, a survivor gives testimony that could change what they think they know. Guest cast: Ruth Madeley as WPC Judy Womack, Molly Vevers as Irene Richardson, Prisca Bakare as Maggie Shaw, Rosa Hesmondhalgh as Pam Hartwell, Kirsty Mather as Paula Dodd, Damien Matthews as James Coverdale, Rakhee Sharma as Beverley Dennings
3	Lewis Arnold	George Kay	9 October 2023	5.06
Guest cast: Liam Ainsworth as Clifford Williams, Nigel Betts as Dr Alan Caplin, Natalie Gavin as Georgie Showalter, Sophie Hopkins as Patricia Atkinson, Asif Khan as Ali Jafari, Andrew Knott as Angus Brownley, Cara Theobold as WPC Jill Adams, Molly Wright as Donna Deangelo, Rob Norbury as Mark Peterborough, Michael Hawkins as Nigel Desford
4	Lewis Arnold	George Kay	16 October 2023	5.52
Guest cast: Harry Egan as Eamon Lister, Jumayn Hunter as Leroy Reid, Mark Jordon as Ray Wood, Ian Lloyd Anderson as Terrence Hawkshaw, Sophie Powles as Samantha Davies, Yasmin Taheri as Lizzie Deacon, Nicola Sloane as Elsie Hawkshaw
5	Lewis Arnold	George Kay	23 October 2023	5.61
Guest cast: Emily Coates as Tracy Browne, Jonathan Coy as Howard Cohen, Orla Fitzgerald as Anna Rogulskyj, Mark Frost as Nick Clarke, Lucie Shorthouse as Cindy Thornbury, Lee Harding as Ben Henderson, Lucy Black as Nora Browne
6	Lewis Arnold	George Kay	30 October 2023	5.66
Guest cast: Craig Anthony-Kelly as James Amberley, Ray Ashcroft as Mr Neal, Kya Brame as Mary Knight, Julian Kay as Dylan Parker, Naomi Radcliffe as Mrs Ashworth, James Dryden as Leonard Symes, Alexander Forsyth as Jack Windsor Lewis, Leah Walker as Olivia Relvers, Neil McKinven as Sir David McNee
7	Lewis Arnold	George Kay	6 November 2023	6.16
Guest cast: Shaun Dooley as DCS Chris Gregg, Adam James as Desmond Wilcox, Calam Lynch as PC Robert Hydes, Jason Done as DS Des O'Doyle

== Production ==
Screenwriter George Kay used the Michael Bilton 2003 book Wicked Beyond Belief combined with case files, interview transcripts, and police reports, to pen the series. The series is produced by New Pictures for ITVX and directed by Lewis Arnold. It is also made in association with Sundance Now who have exclusive rights in North America, and All3Media International are distributing the series internationally. Willow Grylls is executive producer alongside Kay, Arnold and Elaine Pyke. The series is produced by Matt Sandford, series produced by Sarah Lewis and co-produced by Alison Matthews.

=== Filming ===
Filming took place in Yorkshire in June and July 2022, with filming locations including Wortley, Leeds, Dewsbury, York and a residential property on Langford Lane in Burley-in-Wharfedale, near Ilkley.

== Broadcast ==
The series was broadcast in the United Kingdom on ITV1, STV, and ITVX on 25 September 2023. A trailer was revealed on 31 August. On 2 October 2023, all episodes were released early on ITVX and the STV Player.

== Reception ==
In The Guardian, Lucy Mangan praised the series not focusing on the perpetrator: "the attention is on the women. Specifically, the living women. And, when they are gone, the people they leave behind." She also says: "We have come to expect virulent misogyny and racism to be on show in dramas set in earlier decades and involving the police – or any other unwieldy, male-dominated institution – but The Long Shadow succeeds in embedding it more quietly but firmly. It is a way of life, a way of thinking rather than a succession of big instances."

=== Accolades ===
In March 2024, the series was nominated in the Best Limited Drama category at the 2024 British Academy Television Awards.
