= This Is Personal: The Hunt for the Yorkshire Ripper =

- Genre: Crime drama
- Written by: Neil McKay
- Directed by: David Richards
- Starring: Alun Armstrong; Richard Ridings; James Laurenson; John Duttine; Gerard Horan; Sue Cleaver; Maggie Ollerenshaw
- Theme music composer: Hal Lindes
- Country of origin: United Kingdom
- Original language: English
- No. of series: 1
- No. of episodes: 4

Production
- Executive producers: Jeff Pope; Mark Redhead
- Producer: Mike Dormer
- Cinematography: Peter Greenhalgh
- Editor: Nick McPhee
- Running time: 200 minutes (50 minutes per episode)
- Production company: Granada Television

Original release
- Network: ITV
- Release: 26 January – 2 February 2000

This Is Personal: The Hunt for the Yorkshire Ripper is a British television crime drama miniseries, first shown on ITV from 26 January to 2 February 2000. The series is a dramatisation of the real-life investigation into the notorious Yorkshire Ripper murders of the late 1970s, showing the effect that it had on the health and career of Assistant Chief Constable George Oldfield (Alun Armstrong) who led the enquiry. The series also starred Richard Ridings and James Laurenson as DSI Dick Holland and Chief Constable Ronald Gregory, respectively. Although broadcast over two weeks, two episodes were shown consecutively each week.

The series was directed by David Richards and written by Neil McKay. Production was overseen by then-ITV executive producer Jeff Pope, who commissioned it as the first feature in a trilogy of series about the most notorious murder cases of the past century, with the later series being See No Evil: The Moors Murders and the award-winning Appropriate Adult. The series was nominated for the BAFTA TV Award for Best Drama Serial at the 2001 awards. The series was released on DVD on 7 January 2013, individually and as part of a "British Serial Killers" box set, which also includes the ITV-produced series Harold Shipman: Doctor Death, A Is for Acid and The Brides in the Bath.

== Cast ==
- Alun Armstrong as ACC George Oldfield
- Richard Ridings as DSI Dick Holland
- James Laurenson as Chief Constable Ronald Gregory
- John Duttine as DCS Jim Hobson
- Gerard Horan as DCS John Domaille
- Maggie Ollerenshaw as Margaret Oldfield
- Sue Cleaver as Sylvia Holland
- Craig Cheetham as Peter Sutcliffe
- Claire Webzell as Sonia Sutcliffe
- Paul Angelis as DCS Jack Ridgeway
- Pip Donaghy as DCS Wilf Brooks
- Howard Ward as DSI John Stainthorpe
- John Graham Davies as DI Tony Glendenning
- Tim Dantay as DC John Cleasby
- Katharine Rogers as WPC Sue Neave
- Stephen Moore as Professor David Gee
- Kimberley Walsh as Gillian Oldfield
- Mark Benton as Terence Hawkshaw

== Episodes ==
- Episode 1 - 26 January 2000. Viewers: 7.73m

Following the murder of 16-year-old Jayne MacDonald in Chapeltown, ACC George Oldfield (Alun Armstrong) is brought in to head up the enquiry into the 'Yorkshire Ripper' by Chief Constable Ronald Gregory (James Laurenson). He soon comes head to head with the current head of the enquiry, Jim Hobson (John Duttine), who has thrown all of his manpower into trying to identify the killer through tyre tracks left at the scene of Irene Richardson's murder. As George re-diverts Hobson's men away from the tyre investigation, Jean Jordan, another known prostitute, is found murdered. Oldfield suspects he may have a direct link to the killer through a £5 note found in the victim's purse, which was newly printed and could be traced back to the bank where it was first issued. As the investigation closes in on eight firms that could have possibly issued the note in an employees' paypacket, another prostitute, Helen Rykta, is found dead in a block of toilets (incorrect: Helen Rytka was murdered and discovered in a timber yard) in Huddersfield, having disappeared after having sex with a punter.

- Episode 2 - 26 January 2000. Viewers: 7.73m

A young girl who was attacked by an unknown assailant in 1975 comes forward and claims that a Photo-Fit printed in a local newspaper is similar to that of her attacker. Although initially dismissed by her local police, the girl's mother refuses to let the matter drop, and demands to speak to the original investigating officer, Hobson. Meanwhile, the police receive two letters claiming to be from the 'Ripper'. Although initially dismissed by Oldfield and his team, the murder of 42-year-old Vera Millward throws the validity of the letters into question as it appears that details of Vera's murder were suggested before the murder took place. Later, Oldfield receives a package in the post containing a tape purporting to be an audio recording of the killer. He initially decides to shield the tape from the press, in order to pursue discreet enquiries in the hope of identifying the killer through vocal recognition. But when news of the tape is mysteriously leaked to the press, Oldfield is outraged and accuses Hobson.

- Episode 3 - 2 February 2000. Viewers: 8.81m

Convinced that the tape isn't a hoax, Oldfield approaches Tracey Brown in the hope that she can identify the voice as being that of her attacker. However, Tracey is unable to confirm Oldfield's suspicions and claims that her attacker spoke with a Yorkshire accent. Continued house-to-house enquiries bring officers into contact with Peter Sutcliffe, and despite his colleagues' misgivings, a young detective constable highlights his concerns to Holland about Sutcliffe, although his pleas fall on deaf ears. The enquiry into the £5 note is reopened when the bank offer new evidence that suggests the note could only have been supplied to one of three firms. Sutcliffe is interviewed again, but once again, no suspicions are raised. Meanwhile, Holland is sidelined from the investigation when his wife, Sylvia (Sue Cleaver), goes into premature labour and their baby dies shortly after birth. Oldfield's health is also deteriorating, leading to a heart attack shortly before the discovery of another victim.

- Episode 4 - 2 February 2000. Viewers: 8.81m

16-year-old Theresa Sykes is attacked on her way from a local newsagent in Huddersfield, and local division identify the incident as a possible 'Ripper' attack. Holland speaks to the victim in hospital and manages to collect another photo-fit. Twelve days later, 20-year-old Jacqueline Hill is found dead by binmen in an alleyway in Leeds. With little progress made since the Ripper's twelfth victim, Gregory informs Oldfield that he is to be taken off the case on the grounds of ill health, and that the enquiry will now be headed up by Hobson. As new year passes, Oldfield begins to settle in to a new job in uniform, although in reality, Oldfield was not re-assigned until after the eventual arrest of Sutcliffe. On 2 January 1981, patrol officers in Sheffield catch sight of a known prostitute in a car blocking a secluded alleyway, and decide to arrest her for soliciting. A standard check on the car reveals that PNC details do not match the vehicle in question, and the officers discover it to be on false plates. The owner, Peter Sutcliffe, is arrested and brought in for questioning. Whilst in custody, officers decide to return to the scene and uncover a knife and a ball-pein hammer. Later, they also discover a second knife found in the police station toilets, both seemingly deposited by the suspect after declaring that he needed the toilet. After intense questioning, Sutcliffe confesses to the murders.
