= Peter Sutcliffe =

English serial killer (1946–2020)

- Sutcliffe after his arrest in Sheffield, 1981
- Born: Peter William Sutcliffe; 2 June 1946; Shipley, West Riding of Yorkshire, England
- Died: 13 November 2020 (aged 74); Brasside, Durham, England
- Other names: Peter Coonan; Yorkshire Ripper
- Occupation: HGV driver
- Spouse: Sonia Szurma (m. 1974; div. 1994)
- Convictions: Murder (×13); Attempted murder (×7)
- Penalty: 20 concurrent life sentences (whole life order)

Details
- Span of crimes: 1975 – 1980 (confirmed)
- Country: England
- Locations: Greater Manchester; West Yorkshire
- Killed: 13
- Injured: 7+ (attempted murder)
- Date apprehended: 2 January 1981
- Imprisoned at: HM Prison Parkhurst (1981); Broadmoor Hospital (1984); HM Prison Frankland (2016)

Peter William Sutcliffe (2 June 1946 – 13 November 2020), also known as Peter Coonan, was an English serial killer who was convicted of murdering thirteen women and girls, and attempting to murder seven others between 1975 and 1980. Press reports dubbed him the "Yorkshire Ripper", an allusion to the Victorian serial killer Jack the Ripper. Sutcliffe was sentenced to twenty concurrent sentences of life imprisonment, which were converted to a whole life order in 2010. Two of his murders took place in Manchester; all the others took place in West Yorkshire. Criminal psychologist David Holmes characterised Sutcliffe as being an "extremely callous, sexually sadistic serial killer".

Sutcliffe initially attacked women and girls in residential areas, but appears to have shifted his focus to red-light districts because he was attracted by the vulnerability of prostitutes and the ambivalent attitude of police to prostitutes' safety. After his arrest in Sheffield by South Yorkshire Police for driving with false number plates in January 1981, he was transferred to the custody of West Yorkshire Police, who questioned him about the killings. Sutcliffe confessed to being the perpetrator, saying that the voice of God had sent him on a mission to kill prostitutes. At his trial he pleaded not guilty to murder on grounds of diminished responsibility but was convicted of murder on a majority verdict. Following his conviction, Sutcliffe began using his mother's maiden name of Coonan.

The search for Sutcliffe was one of the largest and most expensive manhunts in British history. West Yorkshire Police faced severe criticism for their failure to catch Sutcliffe despite having interviewed him nine times in the course of their five-year investigation. Owing to the sensational nature of the case, investigators handled an exceptional amount of information, some of it misleading, including hoax correspondence purporting to be from the "Ripper". Following Sutcliffe's conviction, the government ordered a review of the Ripper investigation, conducted by Inspector of Constabulary Lawrence Byford, known as the "Byford Report". The findings were made fully public in 2006 and confirmed the validity of the criticism of the force. The report led to changes to investigative procedures that were adopted by all British police forces. Since his conviction, Sutcliffe has been linked to a number of other unsolved crimes.

Sutcliffe was transferred from prison to Broadmoor Hospital in March 1984 after being diagnosed with paranoid schizophrenia. The High Court dismissed an appeal by Sutcliffe in 2010, confirming that he would serve a whole life order and never be released from custody. In August 2016, it was ruled that Sutcliffe was mentally fit to be returned to prison, and he was transferred that month to HM Prison Frankland. In 2020, Sutcliffe died in hospital from diabetes complications.

== Early life ==
Peter William Sutcliffe was born in Shipley, West Riding of Yorkshire, on 2 June 1946, to a working-class family who lived in Bingley. His parents were John William Sutcliffe and his wife, Kathleen. Sutcliffe's mother was Catholic while his father was a member of the choir at the local Anglican church of St Wilfred's; their children were raised in their mother's Catholic faith, and Sutcliffe briefly served as an altar boy.

Sutcliffe's mother was the victim of domestic abuse by his alcoholic father, making it likely that she struggled through her pregnancy under great emotional stress. Sutcliffe was born prematurely, having to spend two weeks in hospital. One of Sutcliffe's brothers recounted an incident in which their father smashed a beer glass over Sutcliffe's head during a Christmas argument when the brother was four or five years old. Additionally, Sutcliffe's father would whip his children with a belt. In 1970, Sutcliffe's father posed as his wife's lover in order to lure her to a local hotel, taking along Sutcliffe and two of his siblings to witness him expose her infidelity. When Sutcliffe's mother arrived, his father pulled out a negligee from her purse as her children watched.

In his late adolescence Sutcliffe developed a growing obsession with voyeurism, and spent much time spying on prostitutes and their male clients. Reportedly a loner, he left school at the age of 15 and had a series of menial jobs, including two stints as a gravedigger at Bingley Cemetery in the 1960s. Because of this occupation, Sutcliffe developed a macabre sense of humour — co-workers reported that Sutcliffe enjoyed his work too much and would even volunteer to do overtime washing corpses. Between November 1971 and April 1973, Sutcliffe worked at the Baird Television factory on a packaging line. He left this position when he was asked to go on the road as a salesman.

After leaving Baird Television, Sutcliffe worked night shifts at the Britannia Works of Anderton International from April 1973. In February 1975, he took redundancy and used half of the £400 pay-off to train as a heavy goods vehicle (HGV) driver. On 5 March 1976, Sutcliffe was dismissed from this employment for the theft of used tyres. He was unemployed until October 1976, when he found a job as an HGV driver for T. & W.H. Clark Holdings Ltd. on the Canal Road Industrial Estate in Bradford.

Sutcliffe reportedly hired prostitutes as a young man, and it has been speculated that he had a bad experience during which he was conned out of money by a prostitute and her pimp. Other analyses of Sutcliffe's actions have not found evidence that he actually sought the services of prostitutes but note that he nonetheless developed an obsession with them, including "watching them soliciting on the streets of Leeds and Bradford".

On 14 February 1967, Sutcliffe met sixteen-year-old Sonia Szurma, the daughter of Ukrainian and Polish refugees from Czechoslovakia, at the Royal Standard, a pub on Manningham Lane in Bradford's red-light district; they married on 10 August 1974. Sonia was studying to become a teacher when she was diagnosed with paranoid schizophrenia. Her relationship with Sutcliffe was later characterised by the writer Gordon Burn as domineering, with Sonia willing to slap down her husband "like a naughty schoolboy", while Sutcliffe even had to occasionally "contain her physically by pinning her arms to her side" during her common "unprovoked outbursts of rage". Barbara Jones, a journalist who had numerous conversations with Sonia, described her as the strangest, coldest and most irritating person she had ever encountered, noting that she was incredibly prickly and demanding.

Sonia suffered several miscarriages after marrying Sutcliffe, and the couple were informed that she would not be able to have children. Sonia eventually resumed her teacher training course, during which time she had an affair with an ice-cream van driver. When she completed the course in 1977 and began teaching, she and Sutcliffe used her salary to buy a house at 6 Garden Lane in Heaton, into which they moved on 26 September 1977, and where they were living at the time of Sutcliffe's arrest in 1981.

== Attacks and murders ==
=== 1969 ===
Sutcliffe's first documented assault was against a prostitute he encountered while searching for another woman who had deceived him out of money. He left his friend Trevor Birdsall's minivan and walked along St Paul's Road in Bradford until he was out of sight. When he returned, Sutcliffe appeared out of breath, as if he had been running, and instructed Birdsall to drive away quickly. He claimed to have followed a prostitute into a garage and struck her on the head with a stone wrapped in a sock. The following day, police visited Sutcliffe's home because the woman he attacked had noted Birdsall's vehicle registration plate. Sutcliffe admitted to hitting her but insisted it was with his hand. The officers informed him that he was "very lucky" because the woman did not wish to press charges.

=== 1975 ===
Sutcliffe committed his second known assault in Keighley on the night of 5 July 1975. He attacked 36-year-old Anna Rogulskyj, who was walking alone, striking her unconscious with a hammer and slashing her stomach with a knife. Disturbed by a neighbour, Sutcliffe left the scene without killing her. Rogulskyj survived after brain surgery but was psychologically traumatised by the attack. She later expressed that she had been fearful of going out frequently due to the feeling that people were staring and pointing at her, and that the encounter with Sutcliffe had turned her life into a misery where at times she wished she had died in the attack.

On the night of 15 August, Sutcliffe attacked 46-year-old Olive Smelt in Halifax. Employing the same modus operandi, he briefly engaged Smelt with a commonplace pleasantry about the weather before striking hammer blows to her skull from behind. He then disarranged Smelt's clothing and slashed her lower back with a knife. Again, Sutcliffe was interrupted and left his victim badly injured but alive. Like Rogulskyj, Smelt subsequently suffered severe emotional and mental trauma. She later told Detective Superintendent Dick Holland that her attacker had a Yorkshire accent, but this information was ignored, as was the fact that neither she nor Rogulskyj were in towns with a red-light district.

On 27 August, Sutcliffe targeted 14-year-old Tracy Browne in Silsden, attacking her from behind and hitting her on the head five times while she was walking along a country lane. He ran off when he saw the lights of a passing car, leaving his victim requiring brain surgery. Sutcliffe was not convicted of the attack but confessed in 1992. Browne later recalled that she had initially felt charmed by Sutcliffe, noting that they had walked together for almost a mile—about thirty minutes—without ever feeling intimidated or in danger.

Sutcliffe's first confirmed murder victim was 28-year-old Wilma Mary McCann, a Scottish mother of four residing in Scott Hall, on 30 October. McCann was last seen alive at 7:30 p.m. when she left her council house on Scott Hall Avenue, in the Chapeltown area of Leeds, walking past the nearby Prince Philip Playing Fields. As with the earlier attacks, Sutcliffe approached McCann from behind and struck the back of her skull twice with a hammer. An extensive inquiry, involving 150 officers of the West Yorkshire Police and 11,000 interviews, failed to identify Sutcliffe. (Note: In December 2007, McCann's eldest daughter, Sonia, died by suicide, reportedly after years of anguish and depression over the circumstances surrounding her mother's death, and the subsequent consequences to her and her siblings.)

=== 1976 ===
Sutcliffe committed his next murder in Leeds on 20 January 1976, when he stabbed 42-year-old Emily Monica Jackson fifty-six times. In dire financial straits, Jackson had been persuaded by her husband to engage in prostitution, using the van of their family roofing business. Sutcliffe picked up Jackson, who was soliciting outside the Gaiety pub on Roundhay Road, then drove about half a mile to some derelict buildings on Enfield Terrace in the Manor Industrial Estate. Sutcliffe hit Jackson on the head with a hammer, dragged her body into a rubbish-strewn yard, then used a sharpened screwdriver to stab her in the neck, chest and abdomen. He also stamped on her thigh, leaving behind an impression of his boot.

Sutcliffe attacked 20-year-old Marcella Claxton in Roundhay Park on 9 May. Walking home from a party, Claxton accepted an offer of a lift from Sutcliffe. When she got out of the car to urinate, he hit her from behind with a hammer. Claxton had been four months pregnant and subsequently miscarried her baby, for which Sutcliffe was never held legally responsible. She survived the attack and later testified against Sutcliffe at his trial. She required multiple, extensive brain operations and suffered from intermittent blackouts and chronic depression. Claxton, a young black woman, was wrongly assumed to be a sex worker by the Police. Police also refused to believe she had been attacked by a white man, and dismissed her accurate description of Sutcliffe.

=== 1977 ===
On 5 February 1977, Sutcliffe attacked 28-year-old Irene Richardson, a Chapeltown prostitute, in Roundhay Park. Richardson was last seen at 11:15 p.m. leaving a rooming house on Cowper Street, saying she was going to Tiffany's, a pub and disco in the centre of Leeds. Richardson was bludgeoned to death with a hammer, and stabbed in the neck and throat, and three times in the stomach. Once she was dead, Sutcliffe mutilated her corpse with a knife and arranged her body by neatly placing her knee-length boots over the back of her thighs. Tyre tracks left near the murder scene resulted in a long list of possible suspect vehicles.

Two months later, on 23 April, Sutcliffe killed 32-year-old prostitute Patricia "Tina" Atkinson-Mitra in her Bradford flat, where police found a boot print on the bedclothes. According to Sutcliffe, he picked Atkinson up in Manningham before driving to her residence. There he hit her on the back of the head four times to incapacitate her, then pulled down her jeans and pants and exposed her breasts. Sutcliffe then stabbed her six times in the stomach with a knife.

On 25 June, 16-year-old Jayne Michelle MacDonald went to meet friends at the Hofbrauhaus, a German-style bierkeller in Leeds. She missed the last bus home and went back to a friend's house to see if her friend's sister could take her home. After approximately forty-five minutes, MacDonald decided to walk home. During the journey she was attacked by Sutcliffe in Reginald Street at around 2:00 a.m. Her body was discovered the following morning at 9:45 a.m. by children in the playground between Reginald Terrace and Reginald Street in Chapeltown. A post mortem was carried out by the Home Office pathologist Professor David Gee. The extent of her injuries was not revealed at the time by police, although it was subsequently revealed she had been struck on the head three times with a hammer and had been stabbed in the chest and back; a broken bottle was found embedded in her chest.

The following month, on 10 July, Sutcliffe assaulted 43-year-old Maureen Long in Bradford. Long was leaving a nightclub when Sutcliffe offered her a lift home. Long stopped to urinate and Sutcliffe struck her on the head, knocking her out. Long was suffering from hypothermia when found and was hospitalised for nine weeks. A witness misidentified the make of Sutcliffe's car, resulting in more than 300 police officers checking thousands of cars without success.

On the 1st of October, Sutcliffe murdered 20-year-old Jean Bernadette Jordan, a prostitute and mother of two from Manchester known to friends as "Scottish Jean". (Note: Jordan was born and raised in Motherwell; she had run away from home at age sixteen in early 1973. Shortly thereafter, a young chef named Alan Royle had observed her wandering aimlessly around Manchester Piccadilly station. Upon learning she had no money or friends in Manchester, he invited her to move into his Newall Green flat. Jordan agreed, and the two soon began a relationship.) Shortly after 9:00 p.m., Sutcliffe was cruising the area of Moss Side when he picked up Jordan. After they arrived at an allotment in Princess Road near Southern Cemetery, he hit her once in the head with a hammer before proceeding to hit her ten more times. In a later confession, Sutcliffe admitted he had realised the new £5 note he had given to Jordan was traceable. After hosting a family party at his home on 9 October, he returned to the wasteland behind Southern Cemetery, where he had left the body, but was unable to find the note. He stripped the body of its clothing and used a knife and a broken pane of glass to mutilate her corpse and attempted to decapitate her using the glass and a hacksaw.

On the morning of 10 October, Jordan's body was discovered by local dairy worker and future actor Bruce Jones, who had an allotment on land adjoining the site and was searching for house bricks when he made the discovery. The £5 note, hidden in a secret compartment in Jordan's handbag, was traced to branches of the Midland Bank in Bingley and Shipley. Police analysis of bank operations allowed them to narrow their field of inquiry to 8,000 employees who could have received it in their wage packet. Over the next three months, the police interviewed 5,000 men, including Sutcliffe. The police found that Sutcliffe's alibi, the family party, was credible. Weeks of intense investigations pertaining to the origins of the note led to nothing, leaving investigators frustrated that they collected an important clue but had been unable to trace the actual firm to which or whom the note had been issued.

On 14 December, Sutcliffe attacked Marilyn Moore, a 25-year-old prostitute, in the back of his car on wasteland in Scott Hall. Sutcliffe lost his balance whilst delivering a blow to Moore with a hammer, allowing Moore to escape with severe head injuries. Tyre tracks found at the scene matched those from an earlier attack. The resulting photofit bore a strong resemblance to Sutcliffe, as had those from other survivors, and Moore provided a good description of Sutcliffe's black Sunbeam Rapier, which had been seen in red-light areas. Sutcliffe was interviewed on this issue.

=== 1978 ===
Police discontinued the search for the person who received the £5 note in January 1978. Although Sutcliffe was interviewed about the matter, he was not investigated further and was contacted and disregarded by the Yorkshire Ripper investigation on several further occasions. That month, Sutcliffe killed Yvonne Ann Pearson, a 21-year-old prostitute from Bradford, on 21 January. He repeatedly bludgeoned Pearson about the head with a ball-peen hammer, then jumped on her chest before stuffing horsehair into her mouth from a discarded sofa, under which he hid her body near Lumb Lane.

Ten days later, on 31 January, Sutcliffe killed Elena "Helen" Rytka, an 18-year-old prostitute from Huddersfield, striking her on the head five times as she exited his vehicle at Garrards timber yard before stripping most of her clothes, although her bra and polo-neck jumper were positioned above her breasts. Rytka was then sexually assaulted as she lay on the ground. Rytka was the sole victim that Sutcliffe had raped. After Rytka staggered to her feet, Sutcliffe again struck her on the back of the head with his hammer a number of times before retrieving a knife from his car and stabbing her repeatedly through the heart and lungs. Rytka's body was found three days later behind a stack of timber, placed under a sheet of asbestos, beneath the railway arches of the timber yard.

Vera Evelyn Millward, a 40-year-old prostitute and mother of seven, left her council flat in Hulme at 10:00 p.m. on 16 May, telling her boyfriend that she was going out to buy cigarettes. Sutcliffe picked up Millward and drove her to the parking compound of the Manchester Royal Infirmary in Chorlton-on-Medlock. After she got out of his car, Sutcliffe attacked Millward with a hammer. She was also slashed across the stomach and stabbed repeatedly with a screwdriver through the same wound in her back. Sutcliffe slashed her stomach so viciously that he "opened up her stomach". Following her death, Sutcliffe dragged Millward's body against a fence and stabbed her repeatedly with a knife.

=== 1979 ===
On the evening of 2 March 1979, 22-year-old Irish student Ann Rooney was attacked from behind at Horsforth College. She was struck three times on the head, probably with a hammer, according to Professor David Gee, who examined her at Leeds General Infirmary. Rooney's description of her attacker and his car closely matched that of Sutcliffe and his Sunbeam Rapier, which had been flagged by police numerous times in red-light districts in both Leeds and Bradford. In 1992, Sutcliffe confessed to the attack on Rooney, as well as the 1975 attack on Browne. Barbara Mills, QC, the Director of Public Prosecutions, decided at the time that it wasn't in the public's interest to add any additional charges against Sutcliffe for the attacks on Browne and Rooney.

At 11:55 p.m. on 4 April, Sutcliffe killed Josephine Anne Whitaker, a 19-year-old clerk, as she was walking home on Savile Park Moor in Halifax. Sutcliffe hit Whitaker from behind with his ball-peen hammer and hit her again as she lay on the ground. He then proceeded to stab her with a screwdriver twenty-one times in the chest and stomach, and six times in the right leg, before also thrusting the screwdriver into her vagina. Whitaker's skull was fractured from ear to ear.

At approximately 1:00 a.m. on 1 September, Sutcliffe murdered 20-year-old Barbara Janine Leach, a Bradford University social psychology student who had earlier left a pub. Leach was attacked with a hammer after walking past Sutcliffe. He dragged her to the backyard of 13 Back Ash Grove, behind a low wall into an area where dustbins were kept, before pulling up her shirt and bra to expose her breasts and unfastening her jeans and partially pulling them down. He then stabbed her with the same screwdriver that he had used to kill Whitaker. Sutcliffe covered Leach's body with an old piece of carpet and placed stones on top of it. The murder of another woman who was not a prostitute alarmed the public and prompted an expensive publicity campaign, emphasising the connection to the "Wearside Jack" hoax. Despite the false lead, Sutcliffe was interviewed on at least two other occasions in 1979. Despite matching several forensic clues and being on the list of 300 names in connection with the £5 note, he was not strongly suspected.

==== "Wearside Jack" ====
One of multiple billboards erected across Northern England in 1979 appealing for information pertaining to the identity of Wearside Jack.

Despite forensic evidence, police efforts were diverted for several months following the receipt of a taped message purporting to be from the murderer, taunting Assistant Chief Constable George Oldfield of the West Yorkshire Police, who was leading the Ripper investigation. The tape contained a man's voice saying, "I'm Jack. I see you're having no luck catching me. I have the greatest respect for you, George, but Lord, you're no nearer catching me now than four years ago when I started." Based on the recorded message, police began searching for a man with a Wearside accent, which linguists narrowed down to the Castletown area of Sunderland, Tyne and Wear. The hoaxer, dubbed "Wearside Jack", sent two letters to police and the Daily Mirror in March 1978 boasting of his crimes. The letters, signed "Jack the Ripper", claimed responsibility for the November 1975 murder of 26-year-old Joan Harrison in Preston.

The hoaxer case was re-opened in 2005, and DNA taken from envelopes was entered into the national database. The DNA matched that of John Samuel Humble, an unemployed alcoholic and longtime resident of the Ford Estate in Sunderland — a few miles from Castletown — whose DNA had been taken following a drunk and disorderly offence in 2001. On 20 October 2005, Humble was charged with attempting to pervert the course of justice for sending the hoax letters and tape. He was remanded in custody and on 21 March 2006 was convicted and sentenced to eight years in prison. Humble died on 30 July 2019, aged 63.

=== 1980 ===
On 26 June 1980, Sutcliffe, stopped while driving, tested positive for alcohol and was arrested. Whilst awaiting trial for this offence, due in mid-January 1981, he killed 47-year-old Marguerite Walls on the night of 20 August. Walls, a civil servant who was employed at the Department of Education and Science in Pudsey, had left her office between 9:30 p.m. and 10:30 p.m. to walk to her home in Farsley. Sutcliffe incapacitated her with a hammer blow to the back of her head as he continued to strike her while yelling "filthy prostitute" beside a driveway. In order to move her twenty yards from the place of the attack up the driveway and into a high-walled garden, Sutcliffe first tied a length of rope around Walls' neck and tightened it. There he suffocated her and removed almost every piece of clothing except her tights. He partially covered the body with grass and leaves before he left.

On 24 September, a 34-year-old visiting doctor from Singapore, Upadhya Bandara, was walking home in the Leeds suburb of Headingley after an evening out with friends. As she walked along Otley Road, she noticed a man inside a Kentucky Fried Chicken staring at her. After turning into the dimly lit Chapel Lane alley, she was struck twice on the head, rendering her unconscious. A rope was then looped around her neck and she was dragged down the road. Bandara's shoes made a loud scraping sound on the cobbles, which caused enough of a disturbance for a woman whose house backed onto the alley to call the police. Sutcliffe fled the scene. Bandara survived the attack and was able to give a description of her attacker.

Maureen Lea, a 21-year-old art student at University of Leeds, was attacked by Sutcliffe on 25 October. Lea had finished visiting a pub with friends in Chapeltown when she was attacked as she hurried down a dark street to catch the bus home. She suffered from significant wounds, including a puncture hole to the back of her skull, a fractured skull, a fractured cheekbone, a broken jaw and numerous scratches and bruises.

Theresa Sykes, aged 16, was attacked in Huddersfield on the night of 5 November. Sykes was going to a shop in Oakes when Sutcliffe hit her from behind. Her boyfriend heard her screams and ran out, scaring off Sutcliffe. Sykes was recovering from brain surgery when Sutcliffe was arrested.

Jacqueline Hill, a 20-year-old University of Leeds student, was murdered on the night of 17 November. Hill was returning home to her students' hall of residence on Alma Road in Headingley after exiting a bus, when Sutcliffe followed her in his car before passing her and exiting his vehicle and following her on foot. He then delivered a blow to her head from behind. Sutcliffe's attack was interrupted by another passerby and he dragged Hill approximately thirty yards onto vacant land behind an Arndale shopping centre where he struck her twice more in the head with a hammer, removed her clothing and stabbed her repeatedly in the chest and once in the eye with a screwdriver. Hill was the last known murder victim of Sutcliffe.

On 25 November, Trevor Birdsall, Sutcliffe's friend and the unwitting getaway driver in his first documented assault in 1969, reported him to the police as a suspect. In total, Sutcliffe had been questioned by the police on nine separate occasions in connection with the Ripper investigation before his eventual arrest and conviction.

== Arrest ==
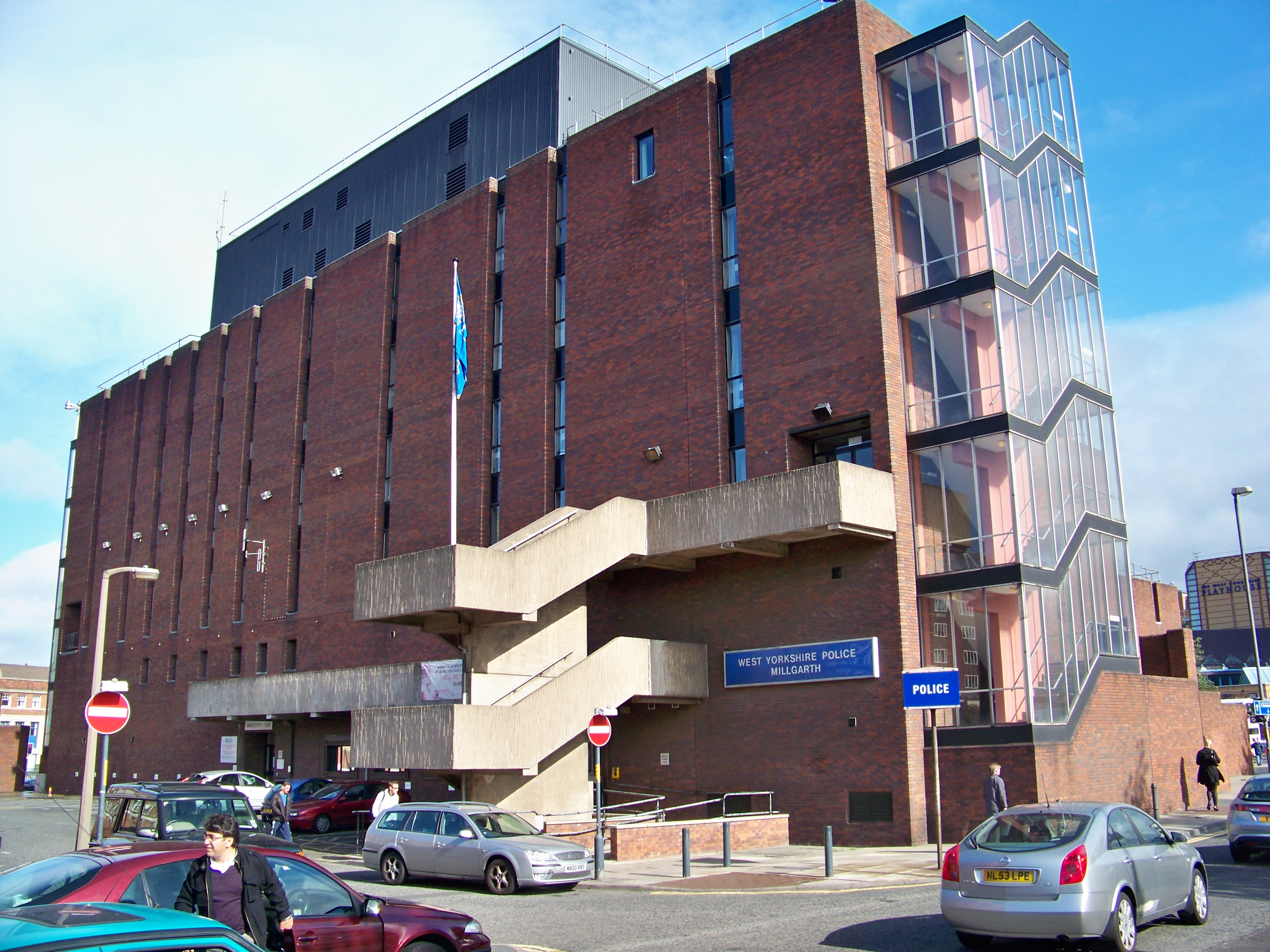
Millgarth Police Station (now demolished) in Leeds city centre, where the Yorkshire Ripper police investigation was conducted.

On 2 January 1981, Sutcliffe was stopped by police with 24-year-old prostitute Olivia Reivers in the driveway of Light Trades House on Melbourne Avenue, Broomhill, Sheffield, South Yorkshire. A police check by Probationary Constable Robert Hydes revealed that Sutcliffe's car had false number plates; he was arrested and transferred to Dewsbury police station in West Yorkshire. There, Sutcliffe was questioned in relation to the Ripper investigation as he matched many of the known physical characteristics.

The next day, Sergeant Robert Ring decided on a "hunch" to return to the scene of Sutcliffe's arrest, where he discovered a knife, hammer and rope that Sutcliffe had discarded behind an oil storage tank when he briefly slipped away after telling police he was "bursting for a pee". Sutcliffe hid a second knife in the toilet cistern at Dewsbury police station when he was permitted to use the toilet. Police obtained a search warrant for his home in Heaton and brought his wife in for questioning.

When Sutcliffe was stripped at Dewsbury police station, he was found to be wearing an inverted V-necked jumper under his trousers. The sleeves had been pulled over his legs, and the V-neck exposed his genital area. The fronts of the elbows were padded to protect his knees as, presumably, he knelt over his victims' corpses. The sexual implications of this outfit were considered obvious, but it was not known to the public until being published in 2003.

When presented with the discovery of the weapons, Sutcliffe suddenly admitted to being the Yorkshire Ripper. Over the following day, he calmly described his numerous attacks. He stated that he experienced an overwhelming urge to kill any woman, describing the impulse to kill girls as practically uncontrollable. Several weeks later, he claimed that God had instructed him to murder his victims, stating that the women he killed were "filth" and "bastard prostitutes" who were cluttering the streets. Sutcliffe only expressed regret when discussing his youngest murder victim, Jayne MacDonald, and showed emotion when questioned about the killing of Joan Harrison, which he vehemently denied. Harrison's murder had been linked to the Ripper killings by "Wearside Jack", but DNA evidence revealed in 2011 that the crime had actually been committed by convicted sex offender Christopher Smith, who died in 2008.

== Charge, trial and conviction ==
Sutcliffe was charged on Sunday 4 January 1981. The fact of his arrest and charge was announced to the media by West Yorkshire Police in a late-night news conference, at which grinning police chiefs said they were "absolutely delighted" with developments. Their conduct was later criticised as having given newspapers and other media an effective green light to publish background material about Sutcliffe, that went against traditional norms of contempt of court. Indeed, this contributed directly to the strictness of the Contempt of Court Act 1981. Sutcliffe first appeared at court at Dewsbury on Monday 5 January, while a large, hostile crowd gathered outside.

At his trial that May, Sutcliffe pleaded not guilty to thirteen charges of murder, but guilty to manslaughter on the grounds of diminished responsibility. The basis of his defence was that he claimed to be the tool of God's will. Sutcliffe said he had heard voices that ordered him to kill prostitutes while working as a gravedigger, which he claimed originated from the headstone of a Polish man, Bronisław Zapolski, and that the voices were that of God.

Sutcliffe pleaded guilty to seven charges of attempted murder. The prosecution intended to accept his plea after four psychiatrists diagnosed him with paranoid schizophrenia, but the trial judge, Justice Sir Leslie Boreham, demanded an unusually detailed explanation of the prosecution's reasoning. After a two-hour representation by the Attorney-General, Sir Michael Havers, a ninety-minute lunch break and another forty minutes of legal discussion, Justice Boreham rejected the diminished responsibility plea and the expert testimonies of the psychiatrists, insisting that the case should be dealt with by a jury. The trial proper was set to commence on 5 May 1981.

Sutcliffe's trial lasted two weeks, and despite the efforts of his counsel, James Chadwin QC, Sutcliffe was found guilty of murder on all counts and was sentenced to twenty concurrent sentences of life imprisonment. The jury rejected the evidence of four psychiatrists who gave testimony that Sutcliffe had paranoid schizophrenia, possibly influenced by the evidence of a prison officer who heard him say to his wife that if he convinced people he was mad, he might get ten years in a "loony bin". Sutcliffe spent the next ten days at Wormwood Scrubs before being transferred to HM Prison Parkhurst on 2 June 1981.

Justice Boreham declared that Sutcliffe was beyond redemption and expressed the hope that he would never be released from prison. He recommended a minimum of thirty years before parole eligibility, suggesting that Sutcliffe would not be free until at least 2011. However, on 16 July 2010, the High Court imposed a whole life tariff on Sutcliffe, ensuring he would never be released. After his trial, Sutcliffe acknowledged two additional attacks, although he was not prosecuted for those offences.

== Criticism of authorities ==
=== West Yorkshire Police ===
West Yorkshire Police were criticised for being inadequately prepared for an investigation on the scale of the Yorkshire Ripper inquiry. It was one of the largest investigations by a British police force and predated the use of modern computers. Information on suspects was stored on handwritten index cards. Aside from difficulties in storing and accessing the paperwork, it was difficult for investigators to overcome the information overload of such a large manual system.

Sutcliffe was interviewed nine times, but all information police had about the case was stored in paper form, making cross-referencing difficult, compounded by television appeals for information, which generated thousands more documents. The Byford Report later concluded that the ineffectiveness of the major incident room was a significant handicap to the Ripper investigation. It should have functioned as the central nerve centre of the police operation; however, a backlog of unprocessed information led to the failure to connect crucial pieces of related information. This critical flaw in the central index system allowed Sutcliffe to repeatedly evade capture.

The selection by Chief Constable Ronald Gregory of Oldfield to lead the inquiry faced criticism from Byford, who argued that appointing a senior officer based on age or years of service should be avoided. Instead, he emphasised the need for an officer with strong professional competence who could inspire confidence and loyalty.

Byford found Oldfield's focus on the hoax tape wanting, and that Oldfield had ignored advice from survivors of Sutcliffe's attacks, from several eminent specialists, from the FBI in the United States and from dialect analysts Stanley Ellis and Jack Windsor Lewis, that "Wearside Jack" was a hoaxer. (Note: Oldfield and other senior individuals involved in the Ripper investigation had consulted senior FBI special agents John Douglas and Robert Ressler in an effort to construct a psychological profile of the Yorkshire Ripper in 1979. According to Ressler, after Oldfield played the tape, Ressler said to Oldfield: "You do realise, of course, that the man on the tape is not the killer, don't you?" and Oldfield chose to ignore this observation.) Indeed, the investigation had used the hoax tape as a point of elimination, rather than as a line of enquiry, allowing Sutcliffe to avoid scrutiny as he did not fit the profile of the sender of the tape or letters. The hoaxer was given unusual credibility when analysis of saliva on the envelopes he sent showed he had the same blood group as that which Sutcliffe had left at crime scenes, a type shared by only 6% of the population. Humble, the hoaxer, appeared to know details of the murders that supposedly had not been released to the press, but that in fact he had acquired from his local newspaper and from pub gossip.

In response to the police reaction to the murders, the Leeds Revolutionary Feminist Group organised a number of "Reclaim the Night" marches. The group and other feminists had criticised police for victim-blaming, especially for a suggested curfew for women at night; let men be issued a curfew instead. Eleven marches in various towns across the United Kingdom took place on the night of 12 November 1977, making the points that women should be able to walk anywhere without restriction and that they should not be blamed for men's violence.

In 1988, the mother of Sutcliffe's last victim, Jacqueline Hill, during an action for damages on behalf of Hill's estate, argued in the case Hill v Chief Constable of West Yorkshire in the High Court that West Yorkshire Police had failed to use reasonable care in apprehending Sutcliffe. The House of Lords held that the Chief Constable of West Yorkshire did not owe a duty of care to the victim due to the lack of proximity and therefore failed on the second limb of the Caparo test. After Sutcliffe's death in November 2020, West Yorkshire Police issued an apology for the "language, tone, and terminology" used by the force at the time of the original investigation, nine months after a victim's son wrote on behalf of several of the victims' families.

=== Attitude towards prostitutes ===
The prevailing attitude within the West Yorkshire Police at that time of the Ripper investigation reflected misogynistic and sexist attitudes, as reported by various sources. Jim Hobson, a senior West Yorkshire detective, stated at a press conference in October 1979 that Sutcliffe had clearly expressed hatred towards prostitutes, a sentiment shared by many. He emphasised that the police would continue to arrest prostitutes, but noted that Sutcliffe was now targeting innocent women. This shift indicated his troubling mental state and a pressing need for medical intervention. Hobson urged Sutcliffe to surrender before another innocent woman was harmed.

Joan Smith noted in Misogynies: Reflections on Myths and Malice—a collection of essays that explores the phenomenon of women-hating in various aspects of society—that even Sutcliffe did not fully deny his actions at his trial, claiming he was demented at the time. During the trial, Michael Havers said in his opening statement that while some of Sutcliffe's victims were prostitutes, the saddest aspect of the case was that some were not, noting that the last six attacks were on completely respectable women. This statement drew criticism from the English Collective of Prostitutes (ECP), who protested outside the Old Bailey. Nina Lopez, one of the ECP protestors in 1981, stated to The Independent forty years later, following Sutcliffe's death, that Havers' comments reflected a criticism of how the police and the establishment were handling the Ripper investigation.

== Byford Report ==
The Inspector of Constabulary Lawrence Byford's 1982 report of an official inquiry into the Ripper investigation was not released by the Home Office until 1 June 2006. The sections "Description of suspects, photofits and other assaults" and parts of the section on Sutcliffe's "immediate associates" were not disclosed by the Home Office. The Byford Report's major findings were contained in a summary published by the Home Secretary, William Whitelaw, disclosing for the first time precise details of the bungled investigation. Byford noted delays in following up crucial tip-offs from Birdsall, who sent an anonymous letter to the police on 25 November 1980. The letter stated that Birdsall had good reason to know the identity of the man sought in the Ripper case, describing him as someone who had dealings with prostitutes and a particular interest in them. The letter provided the name and address: Peter Sutcliffe, 5 Garden Lane, Heaton, Bradford, Clarkes Trans, Shipley.

Birdsall visited Bradford police station the day after sending his letter to reiterate his suspicions about Sutcliffe. He mentioned that he was with Sutcliffe when he exited a car to pursue a woman after an argument at a bar in Halifax on 15 August 1975, which coincided with the Olive Smelt attack. A report compiled during this visit was lost, despite a comprehensive search conducted after Sutcliffe's arrest, as noted in the Byford Report. Byford indicated that the failure to act on Birdsall's anonymous letter and his visit to the police station exemplified the declining efficiency of the major incident room. This oversight allowed Sutcliffe to remain at liberty for over a month when he could potentially have been in custody. Fortunately, there is no evidence to suggest he committed any further murders during that time.

=== Possible victims ===
The Byford Report suggested a high likelihood that Sutcliffe may have had additional victims both during and before his known killing spree. Police identified several attacks that aligned with Sutcliffe's modus operandi and attempted to question him, but he was never charged with these other crimes. The report noted a curious and unexplained lull in Sutcliffe's criminal activities between 1969, when he first attracted police attention, and 1975, the year of his first documented murder. It concluded that Sutcliffe was likely responsible for numerous attacks on unaccompanied women between 1969 and 1980, which he had not confessed to, not only in the West Yorkshire and Manchester areas but also in other regions of the country.

In 1969, Sutcliffe, described in the Byford Report as an otherwise unremarkable young man, came to police attention on two occasions due to incidents involving prostitutes. Later that year, in September, he was arrested in Bradford's red-light district for possessing a hammer, classified as an offensive weapon, but was charged with "going equipped for stealing" because it was assumed he was a potential burglar. The report indicated that Sutcliffe had attacked a Bradford prostitute with a cosh at least once. Byford noted that it seemed improbable that the crimes for which Sutcliffe was charged and convicted were the only ones he committed. This belief was reinforced by examining several assaults on women since 1969 that clearly fit Sutcliffe's established modus operandi. Byford expressed confidence that senior police officers in the relevant areas were aware of this possibility and arranged for effective communication to ensure that all available information was considered.

=== Carol Wilkinson case ===
Only days after his conviction in 1981, crime writer David Yallop asserted that Sutcliffe may have been responsible for the murder of 20-year-old Carol Wilkinson, who was randomly bludgeoned over the head with a stone in Bradford on 10 October 1977, nine days after his killing of Jean Jordan. Wilkinson's murder had initially been considered as a possible Ripper killing, but this was quickly ruled out as she was not a prostitute. Police eventually admitted in 1979 that the Ripper did not solely attack prostitutes, but by this time a local man, Anthony Steel, had already been convicted of Wilkinson's murder. Yallop highlighted that Steel had always protested his innocence and been convicted on weak evidence. Steel had confessed to the murder under intense questioning, having been told that he would be allowed to see a solicitor if he did so. Even though his confession failed to include any details of the murder, and Hobson's testimony at trial that he did not find the confession credible, Steel was narrowly convicted.

Around the time of Wilkinson's murder it was widely reported that David Gee, the Home Office pathologist who conducted all the post-mortem examinations on the Yorkshire Ripper victims, noted similarities between the Wilkinson murder and the killing of Ripper victim Yvonne Pearson three months later. Like Wilkinson, Pearson was bludgeoned with a heavy stone and was not stabbed, and was initially ruled out as a Ripper victim. Pearson's murder was re-classified as a Ripper killing in 1979 while Wilkinson's murder was not reviewed. Sutcliffe did not confess to Wilkinson's murder at his trial, and Steel was already serving time for the murder. During his imprisonment, Sutcliffe was noted to show "particular anxiety" at mentions of Wilkinson due to the possible unsoundness of Steel's conviction.

Sutcliffe was known to have been acquainted with Wilkinson and to have argued violently with her stepfather over his advances towards her. He was familiar with the council estate where she was murdered and regularly frequented the area. In February 1977, only months before the murder, Sutcliffe was reported to police for acting suspiciously on the street where Wilkinson lived. Furthermore, earlier on the day of the murder, Sutcliffe had gone back to mutilate Jordan's body before returning to Bradford, showing he had already gone out to attack victims that day and would have been in Bradford to attack Wilkinson after he returned from mutilating Jordan. The location where Wilkinson was killed was also very close to Sutcliffe's place of employment, where he would have clocked in for work that afternoon.

In 2003, Steel's conviction was quashed after it was found that his low IQ and mental capabilities made him a vulnerable interviewee, discrediting his supposed "confession" and confirming Yallop's long-standing suspicions that he had been wrongfully convicted. Yallop continued to put forth the theory that Sutcliffe was the real killer. In 2015, former detective Chris Clark and investigative journalist Tim Tate published a book, Yorkshire Ripper: The Secret Murders, which supported the theory that Sutcliffe had murdered Wilkinson, pointing out that her body had been posed and partially stripped in a manner similar to the Yorkshire Ripper's modus operandi.

=== Keith Hellawell investigations ===
In 1982, West Yorkshire Police appointed detective Keith Hellawell to lead a secret investigation into possible additional victims of Sutcliffe. A list was compiled of around sixty murders and attempted murders not just in Yorkshire but around the country that West Yorkshire Police and other forces thought could possibly be linked to Sutcliffe. Detectives were able to eliminate Sutcliffe from forty of these cases with reference to his HGV driver's logs, which showed which part of the country he was in when he was working, leaving twenty-two unsolved crimes with hallmarks of a Sutcliffe attack that were investigated further. Twelve of these occurred within West Yorkshire while the others took place in other parts of the country. Hellawell had also listed the attacks on Tracey Browne in 1975 and Ann Rooney in 1979 as possible Sutcliffe attacks, and it was to Hellawell that Sutcliffe confessed to these crimes in 1992, confirming police suspicions that he was responsible for more attacks than those he confessed to.

- On 22 April 1966, shortly after 11:30 a.m., Fred Craven, aged 66, was murdered with a blunt instrument in his betting office above an antiques shop in Wellington Street, Bingley. Craven's wallet, which was believed to have contained £200 in cash, had been stolen by his murderer. Sutcliffe's brother, Michael, aged 16 at the time of the killing, was held for questioning but was eventually released and ruled out as having any involvement. Sutcliffe, then aged 20, knew Craven, who lived at 23 Cornwall Road, and the Sutcliffe family home was less than one hundred yards away at 57 Cornwall Road. Sutcliffe had also asked Craven's daughter to go out with him several times and had been turned down.
- On 22 March 1967, taxi driver John Tomey, aged 27, picked up a passenger in Leeds who wanted to be driven to Bingley; upon stopping the taxi near Bingley, the passenger struck Tomey across the head with a hammer. When he regained consciousness, Tomey was able to drive off and get help at a nearby cottage. He had suffered a fractured skull with multiple lacerations as well as a fractured thumb. In 1981, several weeks after Sutcliffe's arrest in the Yorkshire Ripper case, Detective Sergeant Des O'Boyle questioned Tomey and showed him photographs of different men, including one taken of Sutcliffe after his arrest for going equipped for theft in 1969. Tomey identified Sutcliffe as his attacker.
- On 11 November 1974, while walking across a school playing field in Bradford between 7:30 and 8:00 p.m., Gloria Wood, aged 28, met a man who offered to carry her bags. He then used what appeared to be a claw hammer to hit her in the head. She sustained serious wounds, including a depressed skull fracture with a crescent-shaped wound that later required surgery for the removal of bone shards from her brain. Wood was discovered drenched in blood after the attack was stopped by several nearby youths. While Wood could not provide a photofit of her attacker, she described him as 5 feet 8 inches (1.73 m) tall with black hair and a beard, which fit Sutcliffe's description.
- Debra Marie Schlesinger, aged 18, was stabbed through the heart as she walked down the garden path of her home in Hawksworth after a night out with friends on 21 April 1977. After being stabbed, Schlesinger was pursued before she collapsed and died in a doorway. Witnesses recalled seeing a dark, bearded man near the scene, and there was no clear motive for her murder. Although a hammer was not used, Sutcliffe also often used a knife to stab his victims. Most notably, his work record also showed that he was delivering to an engineering plant 100 yards from Schlesinger's home on the day she was killed. The murder took place only two days before Sutcliffe's known killing of Patricia Atkinson in Bradford. At the time, detectives did not believe her murder was a Ripper killing as she was not a prostitute. However, by 2002, West Yorkshire Police publicly announced they were ready to bring charges against Sutcliffe for Schlesinger's murder although no further action was taken.
- Yvonne Mysliwiec, a 21-year-old journalist, was attacked from behind after crossing a footbridge at Ilkley railway station on 11 October 1979 and suffered a severe head injury. The attack was interrupted by a rail passenger. Her attacker was described as being in his thirties, dark, swarthy, square faced and with crinkly hair, which fit Sutcliffe's description. After his trial, West Yorkshire Police announced that he would be questioned about the Mysliwiec attack.

=== Additional investigations ===
In 2017, West Yorkshire Police launched Operation Painthall to determine if Sutcliffe was guilty of unsolved crimes dating back to 1964. In December 2017, the force, in response to a Freedom of Information request, neither confirmed nor denied that Operation Painthall existed.

- After his conviction in 1981, South Yorkshire Police interviewed Sutcliffe on the murder of 29-year-old Doncaster prostitute Barbara Young, who had been hit over the head by a "tall, dark haired man" in an alleyway on the evening of 22 March 1977. A post-mortem revealed that Young had died from a massive haemorrhage caused by a fractured skull. However, several aspects of the attack did not fit Sutcliffe's modus operandi, particularly as she had been hit from the front and had been the victim of a robbery.
- On 28 August 1979, 32-year-old prostitute Wendy Jenkins was killed in Bristol; she had been stabbed and beaten to death and was found partially buried in a building site sandpit. Avon and Somerset Police liaised with West Yorkshire Police as to whether there were any potential links to the Yorkshire Ripper. Hobson visited the site of the murder in Bristol, but there were a number of differences from Sutcliffe's known modus operandi. Jenkins' murder remains unsolved.
- Links were investigated in 2016 between Sutcliffe and the unsolved murders of two Swedish prostitutes in 1980. Gertie Jensen, aged 31, was found on a Gothenburg building site on 12 August 1980. On 30 August, Teresa Thörling, aged 26, was found dead in the entrance to a building in Malmö with severe head wounds. Bo Lundqvist, a police cold-case investigator, stated that the murders bore Sutcliffe's signature in terms of their "sexually charged brutality". Sutcliffe's name appeared on the manifest of a ferry between Malmö and Dragor across the Oresund Strait a day before the second murder. However, West Yorkshire Police later stated that they were "absolutely certain" that Sutcliffe had never been in Sweden.

=== Yorkshire Ripper: The Secret Murders ===
In 2015, authors Chris Clark and Tim Tate published a book, titled Yorkshire Ripper: The Secret Murders, that claimed links between Sutcliffe and more unsolved murders. They alleged that between 1966 and 1980, Sutcliffe was responsible for at least twenty-two more murders than he was convicted of. The book was later adapted into a two-part ITV documentary series of the same name, which featured both Clark and Tate.

- Mary Judge, a 43-year-old prostitute, was found naked and battered to death on waste ground near the Leeds Parish Church on 22 February 1968. She was last seen outside Regent Hotel in the city centre. Rail passengers from Kingston upon Hull are believed to have seen some of the attack as their train passed the church at Kirkgate at 10:18 p.m. A small boy on the train, which passed within fifty yards of the murder scene, was the main witness. He saw a tall, slim man with long dark hair beating Judge to the ground.
- Lucy Tinslop, aged 21, was attacked after leaving her birthday party at 11:30 p.m. at St Mary's Rest Garden in Bath Street, Nottingham, on 4 August 1969. She was raped and strangled; her abdomen had been ripped open and her vagina had been stabbed over twenty times, which was consistent with Sutcliffe's modus operandi.
- Gloria Booth, aged 29, was found strangled and partially nude in Stonefield Park in Ruislip, West London, on 13 June 1971. Police believe she was attacked as she walked home from work. Sutcliffe was in the area at the time, for his girlfriend was living in Alperton.
- Judith Roberts, aged 14, was murdered on 7 June 1972 after leaving home to ride her bike in Wigginton, Staffordshire. She was found partially hidden beneath hedge clippings and plastic fertiliser bags face down later that day after going missing in a field north of Tamworth; she had nineteen head wounds and had been battered to death. Andrew Evans, aged 17, was wrongfully convicted for the murder and served twenty-five years in jail before his conviction was quashed in 1997. On the evening of Roberts' death, Sutcliffe was driving to visit his fiancée at a hospital in Bexleyheath. He would then have had to return to Bingley, where he worked nightshifts, which would have taken him within a short distance of the murder scene at Comberford Lane. Sutcliffe also drove a grey Ford Escort at the time of Roberts' murder, which is identical to a vehicle that four eyewitnesses observed trailing Roberts as she made her way to local shops before her disappearance.
- Wendy Sewell, a 32-year-old legal secretary, was attacked in Bakewell Cemetery at lunchtime on 12 September 1973. She was beaten around the head seven times with the handle of a pickaxe, which had caused severe head injuries and fractures to her skull. She had also been sexually assaulted. Clark and Tate claimed to have unearthed a pathology report allegedly indicating that the originally convicted Stephen Downing could not have committed the crime. The Home Office responded by stating that it would send any new evidence to the police. Derbyshire Constabulary dismissed the theory, noting a re-investigation in 2002 had found only that Downing could not be ruled out of the investigation and responded by stating that there was no evidence linking Sutcliffe to the crime.
- Rosina Hilliard, a 24-year-old prostitute, was found on 22 February 1974 at a building site near Humberstone Road, Leicester. She had been hit by a car and suffered extensive head injuries and fractures to her spine and collar bone. A post-mortem confirmed someone had also attempted to strangle her. Records show Sutcliffe was delivering goods to and from the area at the time.
- One murder that was linked to Sutcliffe in the book, 25-year-old trainee teacher Alison Morris in Ramsey, Essex, on 1 September 1979, took place only six and a half hours before his known killing of Barbara Leach in Bradford, over 200 mi (320 km) away. Morris was stabbed multiple times as she walked down a footpath along the Stour Brook, 250 yards from her home in Wrabness Road. Clark and Tate claimed that Sutcliffe could have been in Essex and still had enough time to drive back to Bradford to kill Leach later. Morris' case remains unsolved.
- Sally Shepherd, aged 24, was making her way home to Friary Road late at night after getting off a bus in Peckham, South London, on 1 December 1979 when she was clubbed unconscious, sexually assaulted and beaten to death. Her killer then dragged her body through a wire fence and left her at the back of Peckham police station in Staffordshire Street. Sally's murder and Sutcliffe's killing of Yvonne Pearson in January 1978 bore many similarities. Sutcliffe's wife, Sonia, also did a teacher training course in nearby Deptford at the time, and Sutcliffe frequently visited her.

== Jail ==
=== Prison and Broadmoor Hospital ===
Following his conviction, Sutcliffe chose to use the name Coonan, his mother's maiden name. Despite being found sane at his trial, Sutcliffe was diagnosed with paranoid schizophrenia. Attempts to send him to a secure psychiatric unit were blocked.

On 10 January 1983, Sutcliffe was seriously assaulted at HMP Parkhurst by James Costello, a 35-year-old career criminal with several convictions for violence; Costello followed Sutcliffe into a recess of F2, the hospital wing at Parkhurst, and plunged a broken coffee jar twice into the left side of Sutcliffe's face, creating four wounds requiring thirty stitches. In March 1984, Sutcliffe was sent to Broadmoor Hospital under Section 47 of the Mental Health Act 1983.

Sutcliffe's wife obtained a separation around 1989 and a divorce in July 1994. On 23 February 1996, Sutcliffe was attacked in his room in Broadmoor's Henley Ward; Paul Wilson, a convicted robber, asked to borrow a videotape before attempting to strangle Sutcliffe with the cable from a pair of stereo headphones. After an attack with a pen by fellow inmate Ian Kay on 10 March 1997, Sutcliffe lost the vision in his left eye, and his right eye was severely damaged. Kay admitted trying to kill Sutcliffe and was ordered to be detained in a secure psychiatric hospital without limit of time. In 2003, it was reported that Sutcliffe had developed diabetes.

Sutcliffe's father died in 2004 and was cremated. On 17 January 2005 Sutcliffe was allowed to visit Arnside where the ashes had been scattered. The decision to allow the temporary release was initiated by David Blunkett and ratified by Charles Clarke when he became Home Secretary. Sutcliffe was accompanied by four members of the hospital staff. The visit led to front-page tabloid headlines. On 22 December 2007, a fourth attack on Sutcliffe occurred when fellow inmate Patrick Sureda lunged at him with a metal cutlery knife, shouting that he would blind Sutcliffe in his remaining eye. Sutcliffe managed to throw himself backwards, causing the blade to miss his right eye and stab him in the cheek instead.

On 17 February 2009, it was reported that Sutcliffe was "fit to leave Broadmoor". On 23 March 2010, the Secretary of State for Justice, Jack Straw, was questioned by Julie Kirkbride, Conservative MP for Bromsgrove, in the House of Commons seeking reassurance for a constituent, a victim of Sutcliffe, that he would remain in prison. Straw indicated that, although Sutcliffe's release was a decision for the parole board, the extensive evidence he had reviewed suggested that there were no circumstances under which Sutcliffe would be released.

=== Appeal ===
On 16 July 2010, the High Court heard Sutcliffe's application for a minimum term to be set, which would allow for the possibility of parole if deemed safe for release. The court ultimately ruled that Sutcliffe would never be released. In his statement, Mitting described Sutcliffe's actions as a campaign of murder that terrorised a significant portion of Yorkshire for several years. He noted that the only explanation for this behaviour, according to the jury's verdict, was anger, hatred and obsession, and remarked that it is difficult to imagine circumstances under which one individual could cause so much harm to so many victims, aside from a terrorist act.

Psychological reports describing Sutcliffe's mental state were taken into consideration, as was the severity of his crimes. Sutcliffe spent the rest of his life in custody. On 4 August 2010, a spokeswoman for the Judicial Communications Office confirmed that Sutcliffe had initiated an appeal against the decision. The hearing for Sutcliffe's appeal began on 30 November 2010, at the Court of Appeal. The appeal was rejected on 14 January 2011. On 9 March 2011, the Court of Appeal rejected Sutcliffe's application for leave to appeal to the Supreme Court. In December 2015, Sutcliffe was assessed as being "no longer mentally ill". In August 2016, a medical tribunal ruled that he no longer required clinical treatment for his mental condition, and could be returned to prison. Sutcliffe was reported to have been transferred from Broadmoor to HM Prison Frankland in August 2016.

=== Death ===
Peter Sutcliffe died at University Hospital of North Durham, at the age of 74, on 13 November 2020, from natural causes, after having previously returned to HM Prison Frankland following treatment for a suspected heart attack at the same hospital two weeks prior. He had a number of underlying health problems, including diabetes and obesity. He had been suffering from underlying health conditions, but the Prison Service could not confirm the cause of death, calling it "rightly a matter for the coroner".

A private funeral ceremony was held, and Sutcliffe's body was cremated.

== Media ==
The song "Night Shift" by the English band Siouxsie and the Banshees on their 1981 album Juju is about Sutcliffe.

On 6 April 1991, Sutcliffe's father, John, talked about his son on the television discussion programme After Dark.

This Is Personal: The Hunt for the Yorkshire Ripper, a British television crime drama miniseries, first shown on ITV from 26 January to 2 February 2000, is a dramatisation of the real-life investigation into the murders, showing the effect that it had on the health and career of Assistant Chief Constable George Oldfield (Alun Armstrong). The series also starred Richard Ridings and James Laurenson as DSI Dick Holland and Chief Constable Ronald Gregory, respectively. Although broadcast over two weeks, two episodes were shown consecutively each week. The series was nominated for the British Academy Television Award for Best Drama Serial at the 2001 awards.

In 2009, the three TV films Red Riding, also called The Yorkshire Ripper trilogy, depicted some of Sutcliffe's deeds. The third book (and second episodic television adaptation) in David Peace's Red Riding series is set against the backdrop of the Ripper investigation. In that episode, Sutcliffe is played by Joseph Mawle. The 13 May 2013 episode of Crimes That Shook Britain focused on the case.

On 26 August 2016, the police investigation was the subject of BBC Radio 4's The Reunion. Sue MacGregor discussed the investigation with John Domaille, who subsequently served as assistant chief constable in the West Yorkshire Police; Andy Laptew, a young detective who conducted interviews with Sutcliffe; Elaine Benson, a detective who was part of the investigative team; David Zackrisson, who worked on the false leads, the "Wearside Jack" tape and the Sunderland letters; and Christa Ackroyd, a local journalist.

A three-part series of one-hour episodes, The Yorkshire Ripper Files: A Very British Crime Story, by filmmaker Liza Williams aired on BBC Four in March 2019. This included interviews with some of the victims, their families, police and journalists who covered the case. In the series she questions whether the attitude towards women on the part of both the police and society prevented Sutcliffe from being caught sooner. On 31 July 2020, the series won the BAFTA prize for Specialist Factual TV programming.

A play written by Olivia Hirst and David Byrne, The Incident Room, premiered at Pleasance as part of the 2019 Edinburgh Festival Fringe. The play focuses on the police force hunting Sutcliffe. The play was produced by New Diorama.

In December 2020, Netflix released a four-part documentary entitled The Ripper, which recounts the police investigation into the murders with interviews from living victims, family members of victims and police officers involved in the investigation.

In November 2021, American heavy metal band Slipknot released a song titled "The Chapeltown Rag", which is inspired by media reporting on the murders.

In February 2022, Channel 5 released a 60-minute documentary entitled The Ripper Speaks: The Lost Tapes, which recounts interviews, and Sutcliffe speaking about life in prison and in Broadmoor Hospital, as well as crimes he had committed but that had not been seen or treated as "a Ripper killing".

In 2023, the ITV1 drama The Long Shadow focused on Sutcliffe's crimes.

== See also ==
- Gordon Cummins – Blackout Ripper
- Anthony Hardy – Camden Ripper
- Steve Wright – perpetrator of the Ipswich serial murders
- Alun Kyte – Midlands Ripper
- David Smith – also a murderer of sex workers
- List of prisoners with whole-life orders
- List of serial killers in the United Kingdom
- List of serial killers by number of victims
- Murder of Lisa Hession – another infamous Greater Manchester murder four years after the Ripper spree
- Chris Clark – co-author of Yorkshire Ripper: The Secret Murders, a 2015 book claiming links between Sutcliffe and unsolved murders

== Bibliography ==
- Bilton, Michael (2003). Wicked Beyond Belief: The hunt for the Yorkshire Ripper. UK: Harper Collins. ISBN 9780007169634.
- Burn, Gordon (1993). Somebody's Husband, Somebody's Son: The story of Peter Sutcliffe. Mandarin. ISBN 0-7493-1331-5.
- Clark, Chris; Tate, Tim (2015). Yorkshire Ripper: The Secret Murders. The True Story of How Peter Sutcliffe's Terrible Reign of Terror Claimed at Least 22 More Lives. London: John Blake. ISBN 978-1-78418-418-6.
- Cross, Roger (1981). The Yorkshire Ripper: The in-depth study of a mass killer and his methods. UK: Harper Collins. ISBN 978-0-586-05526-7.
- Jones, Barbara (1993). Voices from an Evil God. Blake Publishing. ISBN 1-8578-2065-7.
- Jouve, Nicole Ward (1986). The Streetcleaner: The Yorkshire Ripper case on trial. Marion Boyars. ISBN 978-0-7145-2847-2.
- McCann, Richard (2005). Just a Boy: The true story of a stolen childhood. Ebury Press. ISBN 978-0-09-189822-9.
- Nicholson, Michael (1980). The Yorkshire Ripper. Star. ISBN 0-3523-0616-5.
- Smith, Joan (1993). "Final chapter – There's only one Yorkshire Ripper". Misogynies. Faber and Faber. ISBN 0-571-16807-8.
- Yallop, David (23 October 2014). Deliver us from Evil. UK: Hachette. ISBN 9781472116581.
