= Stanley Ellis (linguist) =

British radio presenter (1926–2009)

Stanley Ellis (18 February 1926 in Bradford, West Riding of Yorkshire – 31 October 2009 in Harrogate) was an English linguistics scholar and broadcaster, and an authority on English regional dialects.

Born in Bradford, West Riding of Yorkshire, he attended Grange Grammar School and obtained a scholarship to study at Corpus Christi College, Cambridge. His studies were interrupted by World War II, during which he was a navigator in the RAF. After national service, part of which was spent in India, he read English at Leeds University, with a master's thesis on the Lincolnshire dialect.

He worked as principal researcher under Harold Orton on the four volume Survey of English Dialects. Ellis performed much of the field work this entailed, and many of his recordings and interviews are housed in the Leeds Archive of Vernacular Culture. He went on to be a lecturer and senior lecturer in the School of English at Leeds.

He was the first person to provide expert evidence for speaker identification in an English court, and in June 1979, he correctly identified that a tape released by police that purported to be from the Yorkshire Ripper was by a hoaxer (nicknamed Wearside Jack by the press), as the accent was that of someone from an area a significant distance from the crime scene. However, the police disregarded his warning. The hoaxer was finally identified in 2006, and shown to have lived his life in the region Ellis had identified. His colleague on the case and in university, Jack Windsor Lewis, said in November 2012 that Ellis had located the speaker to the Wearside area by comparing his speech with that of a recording made whilst studying the dialect of Washington, but dismissed the reports that Ellis located him as precisely as Castletown.

After taking early retirement from his university post, Ellis continued to provide linguistic expertise as an expert witness in court cases.

From the 1980s, he presented a series of programmes on dialect for BBC Radio 4, entitled "Take a Place Like ..." and "Talk of the Town, Talk of the Country", and later was a host of radio phone-ins, discussing dialect and origins of names and placenames with callers, as well as contributing to programmes such as The Routes of English.

In Talking for Britain: A Journey Through the Nation's Dialects (2005), Simon Elmes paid tribute to Ellis: 'Stanley's deep linguistic wisdom and his love of the British landscape – the people who live in it and who describe it in their talk – inspired me to pursue my own long fascination' (p. x).

He was awarded honorary life membership of the International Association for Forensic Phonetics and Acoustics in 2004.
