= Chris Gregg =

West Yorkshire police officer

Christopher Adam Gregg QPM (born September 1955) is a former Detective Chief Superintendent and was head of West Yorkshire Police's Homicide and Major Enquiry Team (HMET). Gregg joined the force in 1974 and as a constable was put on front-line duties in the Yorkshire Ripper inquiry in the Helen Rytka murder incident room. He left the force in 2008 to take up a senior position as an adviser to a forensic service provider company, LGC Forensics. In 2010 Gregg, together with Lord Stevens and Angela Gallop, founded Axiom International Limited.

== Career ==
In his career, headed some high-profile criminal investigations including:

- The kidnap and murder in November 2000 of 16-year-old Leeds schoolgirl Leanne Tiernan by John Taylor, described at his trial in 2002 by the judge as a "sexual sadist". In February 2003, he was convicted of two rapes, based on DNA evidence, and given two additional life sentences.
- The American fugitive David Bieber who murdered traffic PC Ian Broadhurst and attempted the murder of two other policemen on 26 December 2003.
- Identification of the Yorkshire Ripper Hoaxer, John Humble, who was tried and sentenced in October 2005 – 25 years after the offence which was one of the most notorious – and damaging – hoaxes in criminal history. Gregg won £50,000 libel damages, plus costs, after being accused by Irish writer Noel O'Gara of "stitching up" John Humble as the writer of the hoax letters and sender of a tape recording purporting to be from the Yorkshire Ripper.
- Serial killer Colin Norris, dubbed the 'Angel of Death' who murdered four elderly patients in a hospital in Leeds, receiving a life sentence in 2008.
- Gregg led the enquiry into the Harold Shipman deaths in West Yorkshire, when Shipman, a practising medical doctor, was apprehended, later having 218 murders positively ascribed to him.

On leaving the force he spoke against the misuse by suspected murderers of the protective shield of human rights legislation.

== Awards ==
- 2008: Gregg was awarded the Queen's Police Medal (QPM) in the 2008 Queen's Birthday Honours. Chief Constable of West Yorkshire Sir Norman Bettison described Gregg as one of the finest detectives the force had ever known.
