= Wearside Jack =

British hoaxer (1956–2019)

John Samuel Humble
- Born: 8 January 1956
- Died: 30 July 2019 (aged 63)
- Other name: Wearside Jack
- Occupation: Labourer
- Status: Released and subsequently died
- Conviction: Four counts of perverting the course of justice (March 2006)
- Penalty: Eight years in custody

Wearside Jack is the nickname given to John Samuel Humble (8 January 1956 – 30 July 2019), a British man who pretended to be the Yorkshire Ripper in a hoax audio recording and several letters in 1978 and 1979.

Humble sent a taped message spoken in a Wearside accent and three letters, taunting the authorities for failing to catch him. The message, recorded on an audio cassette, caused the investigation to be moved away from the West Yorkshire area, home of the real killer, Peter Sutcliffe, and thereby helped prolong his attacks on women and may have delayed his arrest by eighteen months.

More than 25 years after the event, a fragment from one of Humble's envelopes was traced to him through DNA, and in 2006, Humble was sentenced to eight years in prison for perverting the course of justice.

== The hoax ==
=== The three letters ===
Between March 1978 and the end of June 1979, Humble sent three letters claiming to be the Yorkshire Ripper. Postmarked from Sunderland, two were addressed to Assistant Chief Constable George Oldfield of the West Yorkshire Police who was heading the Ripper inquiry, and one to the Daily Mirror.

First letter: 8 March 1978

Written to Assistant Chief Constable George Oldfield

Dear Sir

I am sorry I cannot give my name for obvious reasons. I am the Ripper. I've been dubbed a maniac by the Press but not by you, you call me clever and I am. You and your mates haven't a clue that photo in the paper gave me fits and that bit about killing myself, no chance. I've got things to do. My purpose to rid the streets of them sluts. My one regret is that young lassie McDonald, did not know cause changed routine that night. Up to number 8 now you say 7 but remember Preston '75. get about you know. You were right I travel a bit. You probably look for me in Sunderland, don't bother, I am not daft, just posted letter there on one of my trips. Not a bad place compared with Chapeltown and Manningham and other places. Warn whores to keep off streets cause I feel it coming on again.

Sorry about young lassie.

Yours respectfully

Jack the Ripper

Might write again later I not sure last one really deserved it. Whores getting younger each time. Old slut next time I hope. Huddersfield never again, too small close call last one.

"Preston '75" was a reference to the murder of Joan Harrison. The Yorkshire Ripper was believed at the time to have killed her, but the supposed connection was wrongly thought not to be in the public domain leading the hoaxer's claim to gain undeserved credibility. Sutcliffe denied any knowledge and was not charged for this crime. It remained unsolved until 2011, when DNA evidence from the crime scene was matched to those of a deceased man named Christopher Smith (died 2008) who had been convicted of other offences, including attempted rape and manslaughter.

=== The "Wearside Jack" tape ===
On 17 June 1979, Humble sent a cassette to Assistant Chief Constable Oldfield, where he introduced himself only under the name "Jack" and claimed responsibility for the Ripper murders to that point.

I'm Jack. I see you are still having no luck catching me. I have the greatest respect for you George, but Lord! You are no nearer catching me now than four years ago when I started. I reckon your boys are letting you down, George. They can't be much good, can they?

The recording on a cassette tape ended with a segment from the 1978 single "Thank You for Being a Friend" by Andrew Gold. George Oldfield and other senior officers were informed by the FBI that the creator of the tape was a blatant hoaxer. The US profiling expert Robert Ressler indicated, in his co-written book, Whoever Fights Monsters, that he contacted them to inform them immediately after he heard the recording.

Despite this, the police focused on Humble's Wearside accent. Together with voice analysts, they decided (based on dialectology) that the accent was distinctive to the Castletown area of Sunderland. This led to 40,000 men being investigated to no avail, as the killer, Sutcliffe, came from Bradford. Police also commenced a substantial publicity campaign, including 'Dial-the-Ripper' hotlines, 5,000 advertising hoardings, and advertisements in 300 newspapers. Chief Constable Ronald Gregory diverted £1 million from the inquiry's budget into the publicity campaign alone. A few weeks after being played the recording, the voice experts began to try to persuade the police that the tape was created by a hoaxer, but were not listened to.

Interviewed by Joan Smith for The Sunday Times in 1980, Olive Smelt, a victim of Sutcliffe who survived his 1975 attack in Halifax, was angry that the police had ignored her insistence that the perpetrator was a local man. Other survivors' evidence, photofits which were close to Sutcliffe's appearance, were also rejected. A confidential police document issued in September 1979 by the West Yorkshire Police murder incident room instructed detectives to disregard from their inquiries any suspect without a North-East accent.

Peter Sutcliffe, who committed the murders, was interviewed and released nine times over five years. Four of these occasions followed the police decision to search for the man heard on the tape. Each time he was rejected as a suspect because he did not have a North-East accent. In July 1979, Sutcliffe was interviewed by two detective constables who became suspicious. One of the officers, Detective Constable Andrew Laptew, in his report wrote that there was good evidence he was the killer, but the document was downgraded because of Sutcliffe's Yorkshire accent and the lack of a match with the hoaxer's handwriting.

A then unknown victim of Sutcliffe at the time of Humble's first letter was Yvonne Pearson, whose body lay undiscovered, hidden under a discarded sofa in Bradford. This detail raised the suspicion of a Northumbria Police Detective Inspector that the Wearside Jack evidence was a hoax (as the writer of the letter made no reference to this crime) and submitted a report to West Yorkshire police in September 1979, but the report was ignored. One coincidence between Harrison's (then falsely suspected) killer and Wearside Jack was the secretion of their B-group blood cells in their saliva and semen, retrieved from her murder scene and from the gum of one of the letters, a quality shared by only 6% of men. It was this which was taken as definitive proof the Yorkshire Ripper was the same man as had sent the letters and the tape.

=== Hoax confirmed ===
While the West Yorkshire Police were investigating the leads, Sutcliffe murdered three more women, and attacked two others. It was only after Sutcliffe's confession that Wearside Jack was demonstrated to be a hoax. ACC Oldfield took early retirement following what he considered to be a total humiliation; he died in 1985 aged 61. It emerged during Humble's own trial that Sutcliffe had told police after his arrest in 1981 that "While ever that was going on I felt safe. I'm not a Geordie. I was born at Shipley."

== John Humble ==
=== Early life ===
The son of Sam and Violet Humble, Humble attended Hylton Road Junior School and Havelock Senior School on Fordfield Road in the Ford Estate in Sunderland. He had "above average" school results, and gained a few qualifications, before leaving school at 16. His limited periods of employment included a bricklaying apprenticeship (which he gave up after three years), six months in a hospital laundry and a short period as a security guard.

In 1990, Humble married a woman he had been in a relationship with for six weeks. In the early years of the marriage, he was said to be a good step-father for her two children, but he became abusive to his wife and was eventually convicted of common assault, leading to the couple's separation around 1999. Humble returned to the Ford Estate to live with his brother in 2002.

=== DNA match leads to arrest ===
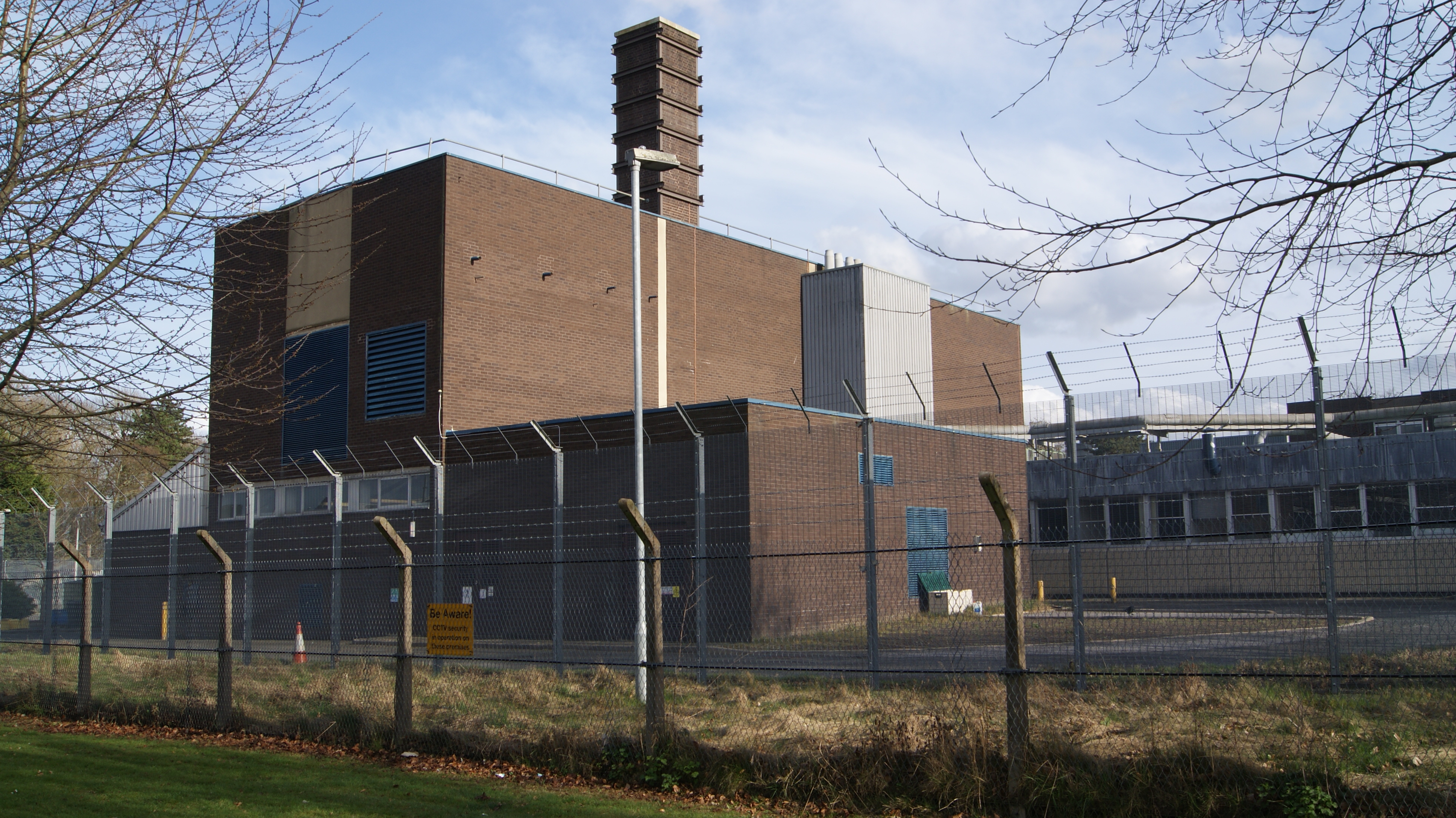
The DNA from the envelopes was tested at the Forensic Science Service laboratory in Wetherby, West Yorkshire.

A breakthrough came in 2005 after senior officers from West Yorkshire Police’s Homicide and Major Enquiry Team (HMET), headed by Detective Chief Superintendent Chris Gregg, decided to review the case. A small piece of the gummed seal from one of the envelopes was located in a forensic laboratory in London, and, following publicity about the cold case review, the original hoax tape was retrieved from a retired scientist who had worked on the original investigation.

As a result of this cold case review, DNA from envelopes sent by Humble as part of the hoax were matched in the United Kingdom National DNA Database with samples police had obtained from Humble in an unrelated incident in 2001, when he had been arrested and cautioned for being drunk and disorderly. By this time, Humble had become a chronic alcoholic. The odds of a specific individual matching the DNA sample were one in a billion, very strongly indicating Humble was the culprit.

Humble, who was living on the Ford Estate in Sunderland, was arrested on 18 October 2005. Described as an unemployed labourer at the time of his arrest at home, Humble and his brother were so inebriated that the police were required to wait almost a day before he could be interviewed; when he sobered up he needed to be told he was now in police custody.

At times during police interviews, Humble appeared ashamed of what he had done, referring to the acts as "evil" and saying he deserved to be imprisoned. Humble admitted responsibility for the letters and the cassette, but denied perverting the course of justice, and his legal team pushed in vain for a lesser charge of wasting police time. He was charged on four counts of perverting the course of justice.

Humble was motivated, according to Gregg after Humble's conviction, by a wish for notoriety, a hatred of the police and a fixation with the Jack the Ripper Whitechapel murders in late-19th century London. The contempt for the police dated back to 1975 when he was imprisoned for assaulting an off-duty police officer (for which he served three months in a young offenders institution), and an earlier conviction for burglary and theft in 1973. Humble's preoccupation with the Whitechapel murders influenced the writing of the hoax letters, some passages being paraphrased from the 19th century letters of the earlier serial killer.

Before Sutcliffe was arrested, Humble twice phoned the police anonymously to indicate they had been hoaxed because he felt guilty for misleading the investigation, but his calls were discounted. One call to Northumbria Police on 14 September 1979, was 12 days after Barbara Leach was killed, the first of Sutcliffe's victims to be murdered after Humble's hoax influenced the police investigation. The call, which was brief, was recorded, but hundreds of hoax calls were received by the police. It also became known that his neighbours had been interviewed by police searching for Wearside Jack, but he had not. Humble was then living a mile from Castletown, where the Yorkshire Ripper was mistakenly thought to be living because of Humble's tape.

=== Trial and conviction ===
Humble was remanded on 20 October 2005. He was tried at Leeds Crown Court on 9 January 2006 and initially pleaded not guilty. He admitted to being Wearside Jack on 23 February 2006, and on 20 March 2006, changed his plea to guilty on four counts of perverting the course of justice.

The prosecution said Humble did not contact the police to acknowledge his direct responsibility, even when it was obvious his tapes and letters were diverting police resources away from the real murderer. His defence counsel said in court that Humble had attempted suicide in November 1979 by jumping off the 90-foot (27 m) bridge spanning the River Wear, as well as on other occasions. Instead of dying, he landed on a boat and was rescued by the police, spending three months in hospital as a result of his injuries and undergoing psychiatric treatment. The defence said he had lived an "inadequate life", and had been driven to alcoholism by his guilt.

On 21 March 2006, Humble was sentenced to eight years in prison. In July 2006, he launched an appeal against his sentence, which was rejected in October of the same year.

=== Release and death ===
Humble was released in 2009 after serving four years of his sentence; he was given a new identity as John Samuel Anderson.

On 20 August 2019, Northumbria Police said that Humble had died at his home in South Shields on 30 July; he died from heart failure and the effects of his alcoholism.

== In popular culture ==
I'm Jack, a novel by Mark Blacklock, also from Sunderland, is a fictionalised account of Humble in his prison cell mocking the ghost of George Oldfield with further letters.

== See also ==
- Colin Norris case – another case led by Chris Gregg
- Literary forgery
