= The Ripper (TV series) =

British true crime miniseries

- Title card from the series
- Genre: Docu-series
- Directed by: Jesse Vile; Ellena Wood
- Country of origin: United Kingdom
- Original language: English
- No. of seasons: 1
- No. of episodes: 4

Production
- Production company: Netflix

Original release
- Network: Netflix
- Release: 16 December 2020

The Ripper is a British true crime four-part docuseries directed by Jesse Vile and Ellena Wood, released on Netflix on 16 December 2020.

== Synopsis ==
The four-part miniseries recounts the events and investigation surrounding the murders of 13 women in West Yorkshire and Manchester, England between 1975 and 1980 by the serial killer Peter Sutcliffe. Journalists noted the similarities to the murders conducted by the notorious Jack the Ripper, and nicknamed the unknown perpetrator the Yorkshire Ripper. This series follows the chronology of events, told through interviews with investigators, journalists, survivors and family members of victims.

== Episodes ==
No.	Title	Directed by	Original release date
1	"Once Upon a Time in Yorkshire"	Ellena Wood	16 December 2020
In the 1970s, the brutal murders of sex workers in economically depressed areas of the UK spark little public interest — until a teen is also killed.
2	"Between Now and Dawn"	Jesse Vile	16 December 2020
As the killer continues to prey upon women, police hope that tire tracks and a victim's 5-pound note may finally lead to a suspect.
3	"Reclaim the Night"	Ellena Wood	16 December 2020
Police release phone calls and handwriting samples from a suspect. Women protest law enforcement's continued inability to catch the Ripper.
4	"Out of the Shadows"	Jesse Vile	16 December 2020
More than five years after the first attack, the police finally make an arrest, setting off a media frenzy and accusations of a botched investigation.

== Release ==
The Ripper was released on Netflix on 16 December 2020.

== See also ==
- List of Netflix original programming
