= Castletown, Sunderland =

Suburb in Tyne and Wear, England

Coordinates: 54.915°N 1.446°W

Castletown
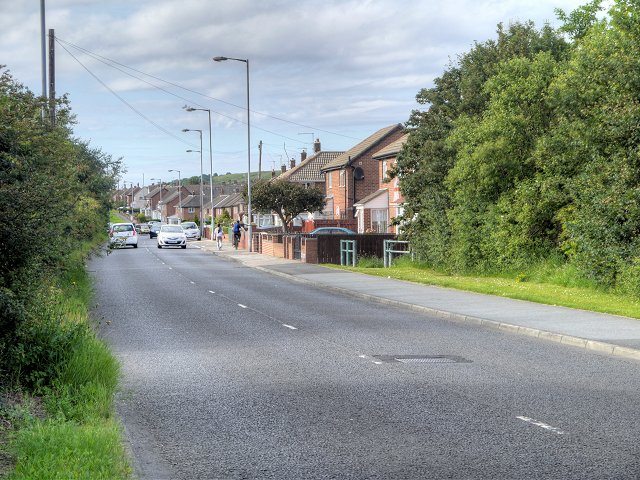
- Ferryboat Lane

- Location within Tyne and Wear
- Population: 3,003
- Metropolitan borough: City of Sunderland
- Metropolitan county: Tyne and Wear
- Region: North East
- Country: England
- Sovereign state: United Kingdom
- Post town: SUNDERLAND
- Postcode district: SR5
- Dialling code: 0191
- Police: Northumbria
- Fire: Tyne and Wear
- Ambulance: North East
- UK Parliament: Sunderland North

Castletown is a suburb of Sunderland in Tyne and Wear, England. A former mining community, the Hylton Colliery was located at the east end of the village; it lies north of the River Wear, and is near to Hylton Castle and Washington. At Hylton Riverside, on the eastern fringe of Castletown, there is a large retail park.

There is a large-scale redevelopment project, aimed at modernising the former pit houses and the area around the Aviary Estate. Since 2011 there have been further developments in the east part of the village. The Aviary area has been completely demolished and a new housing estate has replaced both sides of the main street. This site was re-developed by the Gentoo Group.

At the opposite end of Castletown is the newer development of Fulford Grange.

Castletown also hosts a luxury living estate named The Grove, where some of the current Sunderland AFC footballers live, including Granit Xhaka and Billy Hardy's nephew, Samuel Jordan.

Currently, the records state that Castletown is the least ethnically diverse area in Sunderland, with 99.3% of the population being white.

Despite its proximity to Sunderland, until 1967 this colliery village was under the administrative control of Durham County Council and was part of the Sunderland Rural District Council. This was because it was a fairly isolated community until the extensive council house building of the fifties and sixties at the Red House, Hylton Castle and Town end Farm Estates effectively joining the settlement to the rest of Sunderland's new northern suburbs.

The Northern Spire Bridge, joining Castletown to Pallion, opened in August 2018.

During the search for the Yorkshire Ripper, the accent of "Wearside Jack", the author of a hoax letter claiming to be from the Ripper, was identified by the forensic linguist Stanley Ellis as that of the Castletown area. The hoaxer was eventually revealed to have come from nearby Pennywell.
