= Alun Armstrong =

English actor (born 1946)

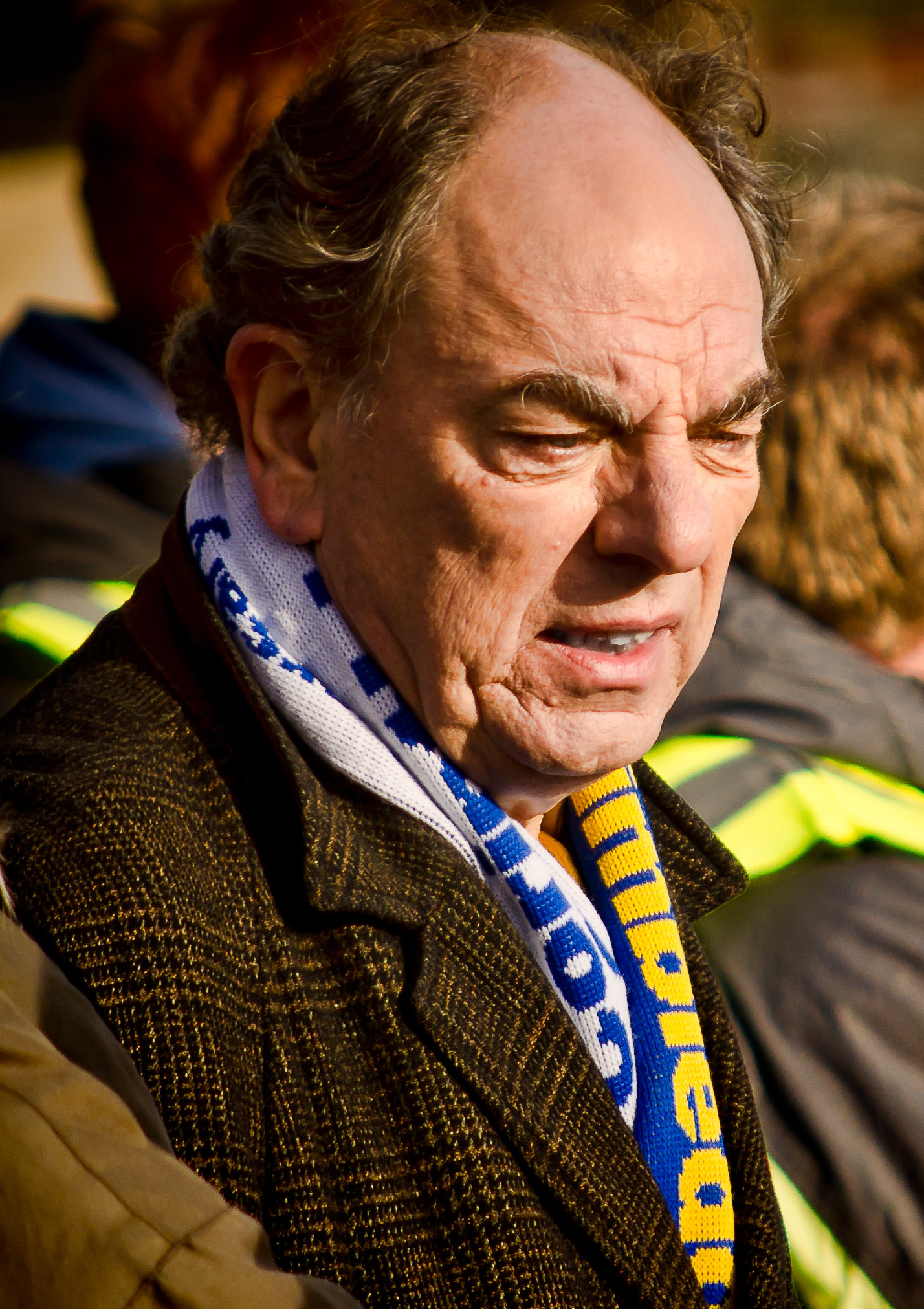
- Armstrong in January 2012
- Born: Alan Armstrong; 17 July 1946 (age 80); Annfield Plain, County Durham, England
- Occupation: Actor
- Years active: 1971–present
- Spouse: Sue Bairstow
- Children: 3, including Joe

Alan Armstrong (born 17 July 1946), known professionally as Alun Armstrong, is an English character actor. He grew up in County Durham, in North East England, and became interested in acting through Shakespeare productions at his grammar school. Since his career began in the early 1970s he has played, in his words, "the full spectrum of characters from the grotesque to musicals... I always play very colourful characters, often a bit crazy, despotic, psychotic."

His credits include several Charles Dickens adaptations and the eccentric ex-detective Brian Lane in New Tricks. He is also an accomplished stage actor and spent nine years with the Royal Shakespeare Company. He originated the role of Monsieur Thénardier in the West End production of Les Misérables and won an Olivier Award in the title role of Sweeney Todd: The Demon Barber of Fleet Street.

== Early life ==
He was born Alan Armstrong in Annfield Plain, County Durham. His father was a coal miner and both his parents were Methodist lay preachers. He attended Annfield Plain Junior School, then Consett Grammar School, where a teacher inspired him to try acting. In the lower sixth he played Petruchio in The Taming of the Shrew, a role he later played with the Royal Shakespeare Company.

Armstrong took part in the National Youth Theatre summer school in 1964, but his background and northern accent made him feel out of place. He studied fine art at Newcastle University. He found the course pretentious and felt that he did not fit in, and he was sent down after two years when he stopped attending classes.

Armstrong had jobs with a bricklayer and as a gravedigger before he decided to try acting again. He started out as an assistant stage manager at the Cambridge Arts Theatre, then went on to a Theatre in Education company affiliated with the Sheffield Repertory Theatre. He also performed in several Radio 4 dramas.

== Career ==
=== Film ===
Armstrong made his screen debut in Get Carter (1971). On learning that the film was being made in Newcastle, Armstrong wrote a letter to MGM, the studio making the film, and was invited to meet director Mike Hodges, who was keen to cast local actors.

Armstrong has appeared in a number of films, although usually in supporting roles. In A Bridge Too Far (1977) he had a small role as one of the British troops at the Battle of Arnhem. He played a French soldier, Lieutenant Lecourbe, in Ridley Scott's 1977 film The Duellists. He had a supporting role as the bandit leader Torquil in the 1983 fantasy film Krull.

His first cinematic lead role was as Maxwell Randall, the titular vampire in Alan Clarke's snooker musical Billy the Kid and the Green Baize Vampire (1987). Armstrong sang I Bite Back.

In Patriot Games (1992) Armstrong played an SO-13 officer. In Braveheart (1995), he played the Scottish noble Mornay who betrayed William Wallace. He was the villainous Egyptian cult leader Baltus Hafez in The Mummy Returns (2001), and he portrayed Saint Peter with a Geordie accent in Millions (2004). He also had small roles as the High Constable in Sleepy Hollow (1999), Cardinal Jinette in Van Helsing (2004), Magistrate Fang in Roman Polanski's Oliver Twist (2005) and Uncle Garrow in Eragon (2006).

=== Television ===
Armstrong has had more than 80 roles in television productions. During the 1970s he appeared in various TV series, including episodes of Whatever Happened to the Likely Lads?, Porridge, Public Eye and The Sweeney.

He was cast in two mini-series dealing with coal miners in North East England. He played Joe Gowlan in The Stars Look Down (1974) based on the novel by A. J. Cronin and he appeared in Ken Loach's Days of Hope (1975) set in his native County Durham. In a 2007 interview, Armstrong singled out Days of Hope as a favourite: "I loved that because it was my own history and background that was being dramatised and, in a way, nothing gets better than that."

In the comedy series A Sharp Intake of Breath he played a variety of characters who complicate the life of the main character played by David Jason. In 1977 he was the strict Deputy Headmaster in Willy Russell's Our Day Out, a television play about a group of working-class schoolchildren on a day trip. He also starred in the 1981 Yorkshire Television drama Get Lost!

Armstrong has portrayed characters from the works of Charles Dickens. He played Wackford Squeers and Mr Wagstaff in the eight-hour Royal Shakespeare Company stage adaptation of The Life and Adventures of Nicholas Nickleby that was filmed for television in 1982. He has appeared in two versions of Oliver Twist: the 1999 ITV mini-series as Agnes Fleming's father Captain Fleming and the 2005 Roman Polanski film as Magistrate Fang. He has had roles in four BBC Dickens adaptations, as Daniel Peggotty in David Copperfield (1999); as Inspector Bucket in Bleak House (2005); as Jeremiah and Ephraim Flintwinch in Little Dorrit (2008); and as Hiram Grewgious in The Mystery of Edwin Drood (2012). Armstrong has been a fan of Dickens since reading David Copperfield aloud in school. He particularly remembered Dan Peggotty's houseboat on the beach, and in order to play the role he turned down an offer from Clint Eastwood, with whom he had worked on White Hunter Black Heart.

In the BBC drama series Our Friends in the North (1996) he played Austin Donohue, a character based on the politician T. Dan Smith. Armstrong portrayed 18th century politician Henry Fox in the BBC serial Aristocrats (1999). In the 2000 TV film This Is Personal: The Hunt for the Yorkshire Ripper, he portrayed George Oldfield, the Assistant Chief Constable for Crime at West Yorkshire Police whose health deteriorated during the investigation as he received messages purportedly from the killer. He was nominated for a Royal Television Society award for his role in This Is Personal.

In the second series of Bedtime (2002) he played a widower concerned about his son's suspicious behaviour. He and Brenda Blethyn co-starred in Between the Sheets (2003) as a frustrated married couple in sex therapy. In an adaptation of Carrie's War, he played a strict man who reluctantly takes in two children evacuated to Wales during World War II.

Armstrong is known for his role as Brian Lane in the BBC One series New Tricks about a group of former police detectives who help investigate unsolved and open cases for London's Metropolitan Police. The character of Brian Lane is an obsessive and socially inept recovering alcoholic who has a great capacity for remembering details of old cases and colleagues. In August 2012 Armstrong announced he would leave the show after the tenth series. The announcement followed comments by the cast in an interview with the Radio Times that criticised some of the series' writing and which drew an angry rebuttal from the show's writer-director, Julian Simpson.

During the run of New Tricks Armstrong continued to take on other projects. He starred in the 2004 TV film When I'm 64 about a lonely retired schoolteacher who starts a relationship with another man. He chose the role despite his apprehension about filming a love scene with co-star Paul Freeman, because he thought it was a lovely and thought-provoking story. He also starred in The Girls Who Came to Stay (2006), about a British couple who take in two girls exposed to the effects of the Chernobyl disaster, and Filth (2008), as the husband of "Clean-Up TV" activist Mary Whitehouse.

For three series from 2009 to 2011 he played William Garrow's mentor John Southouse in the BBC period legal drama Garrow's Law. In 2012, he played the Earl of Northumberland in the BBC2 adaptations of Henry IV, Parts I and II. His son Joe Armstrong played Northumberland's son Hotspur. In the 2014 Showtime horror series Penny Dreadful, Armstrong played Vincent Brand, an actor who gives Frankenstein's monster a job at the Grand Guignol. He guest starred in the 2014 Christmas special of Downton Abbey, and took the role of Clifford Bentley in ITV police drama Prime Suspect 1973.

=== Theatre ===
In addition to his film and television work Armstrong has acted in many theatre productions. One of his early roles was Billy Spencer in David Storey's play The Changing Room at the Royal Court Theatre directed by Lindsay Anderson in 1971. In 1975, he played Touchstone in As You Like It directed by Peter Gill at the Nottingham Playhouse.

Armstrong spent nine years with the Royal Shakespeare Company from 1979 to 1988. On tour and at the Warehouse in 1979–80 he played Dogberry in Much Ado About Nothing and Azdak in The Caucasian Chalk Circle.

In 1981 Armstrong joined the cast of the eight-hour production of The Life and Adventures of Nicholas Nickleby as Wackford Squeers. The company went on tour to perform on Broadway at the Plymouth Theatre. The play was filmed for television at the Old Vic Theatre in 1982.

In productions at the Royal Shakespeare Theatre, the Theatre Royal, Newcastle, and the Barbican Theatre in 1982–83, Armstrong played Trinculo in The Tempest and Petruchio in The Taming of the Shrew with Sinéad Cusack as Kate. In 1983, he played Ralph Trapdoor in The Roaring Girl starring Helen Mirren. He performed the roles of Leontes in The Winter's Tale and John Proctor in The Crucible on a national tour that included Christ Church, Spitalfields in 1984 and on tour to Poland in 1985. In 1985–86, he played Thersites in Troilus and Cressida.

In the autumn of 1985, Armstrong took on what is perhaps his best-known stage role: Thénardier in the original London production of Les Misérables. Thénardier and his wife, played by Susan Jane Tanner, are innkeepers whose shady practices are revealed in the song "Master of the House." Armstrong described Thénardier as "a gruesome and comic character."

Armstrong was one of the first to be cast, along with fellow Royal Shakespeare Company members Sue Jane Tanner and Roger Allam. He was involved in fleshing out his role, particularly in the second act song "Dog Eats Dog." He was surprised by the success of Les Misérables "because it is different to other musicals. Different because it is a sung musical throughout and also a little operatic; I didn't think it would be very popular." He left the production after a year because he became bored with the repetition and wanted to move on to other things.

He sings on Original London Cast Recording. He reprised the role, paired with Jenny Galloway as Mme. Thénardier, in Les Misérables - The Dream Cast in Concert at the Royal Albert Hall in October 1995, which was filmed and released on DVD. He also appeared in the 25th anniversary concert, though Matt Lucas performed the role of Thénardier.

Armstrong received nominations in two categories for the 1985 Olivier Award: Outstanding Performance by an Actor in a Musical for Les Misérables and Actor of the Year for The Crucible and The Winter's Tale. In 1988, he was again nominated for the Olivier Award for the roles of Barabas in an RSC production of The Jew of Malta and the Captain in a National Theatre production of The Father by August Strindberg. The New York Times review of The Father said: "At its imploding center is the superb actor Alun Armstrong... 'To eat or be eaten, that is the question,' says the captain. By evening's end, Mr. Armstrong seems to have been devoured alive by his inner demons..."

During the short run of the musical The Baker's Wife at the Phoenix Theatre in 1989–90, he played the role of the baker Aimable Castagnet. The production, directed by Trevor Nunn, received positive reviews but did not attract large audiences and closed after 56 performances. He was nominated for an Olivier Award for Outstanding Performance of the Year by an Actor in a Musical.

Armstrong won the Olivier Award for Best Actor in a Musical in 1994 for his performance as Sweeney Todd in the 1993 London revival of the musical at the National Theatre. The play also won for Best Musical Revival and his co-star Julia McKenzie won Best Actress in a Musical.

At the Donmar Warehouse, Armstrong appeared as Albert Einstein in Terry Johnson's Insignificance in 1995, and he played Hamm in Samuel Beckett's Endgame in 1996. He starred as Willy Loman in a 1996–97 National Theatre production of Death of a Salesman. In 1997–98, he appeared in a production of the comedy The Front Page directed by Sam Mendes at the Donmar Warehouse. The Independent review noted: "As for Alun Armstrong, we don't meet him until late in the second of three acts but he dominates the entire evening. He barks, bleats and bellows across the stage, grabbing Hildy and the show by the scruff of the neck and hurtling through to a zinger of a climax."

Armstrong took the lead role at short notice in Shelagh Stephenson's play Mappa Mundi in 2002, replacing Ian Holm, who withdrew due to illness. In 2006, he returned to the stage to star in Trevor Nunn's production of The Royal Hunt of the Sun at the National Theatre. At the Proms in 2012, he played Alfred Doolittle in a performance of My Fair Lady starring Annalene Beechey and Anthony Andrews. Armstrong stars in a 2014 production of Ionesco's black comedy Exit the King at the Theatre Royal, Bath's Ustinov Studio.

== Personal life ==
Armstrong and his wife, Sue, have three sons: Tom, Joe (also an actor) and Dan. Father and son played older and younger versions of the same character in the 2010 BBC drama A Passionate Woman, and they played Northumberland and his son Hotspur in the 2012 BBC adaptation of Henry IV. Dan was a musician in the band Clock Opera. Armstrong appeared in the music video for their song "The Lost Buoys".

In July 2009 Armstrong was awarded two honorary degrees in recognition of his contributions to the arts. He received an Honorary Doctorate of Letters from the University of East Anglia and an Honorary Doctorate of Arts from the University of Sunderland. The theatre at the Civic Hall in Stanley, County Durham, near Armstrong's home town, was named after him in 2014.

Armstrong is a supporter of AFC Wimbledon, as is his character in New Tricks.

== Filmography ==
=== Film ===
Year	Title	Role	Notes
1971	Get Carter	Keith Lacey	
1973	The 14	Tommy	Also known as Existence and The Wild Little Bunch
1973	The Sex Victims	George	Short film
1976	Don't Tell the Lads		Dramatised health and safety documentary on lead poisoning
1976	The Likely Lads	Milkman	
1977	A Bridge Too Far	Corporal Davies	
1977	The Duellists	Lacourbe	
1981	The French Lieutenant's Woman	Grimes	
1983	Krull	Torquil	
1985	Billy the Kid and the Green Baize Vampire	Maxwell Randall	
1985	Number One	Blackpool Sergeant	
1989	The Childeater	Stefano	Short film
1989	That Summer of White Roses	Zemba	Also known as Djavolji raj
1990	White Hunter Black Heart	Ralph Lockhart	
1991	American Friends	Dr. Weeks	
1991	London Kills Me	John Stone	
1992	Blue Ice	Osgood	
1992	My Little Eye	Dad	Short film
1992	Patriot Games	Sergeant Jimmy Owens	
1992	Split Second	Thrasher	
1994	Black Beauty	Reuben Smith	
1995	An Awfully Big Adventure	Uncle Vernon	
1995	Braveheart	Mornay	
1997	The Saint	Inspector Teal	
1999	G:MT – Greenwich Mean Time	Uncle Henry	
1999	Onegin	Zaretsky	
1999	Sleepy Hollow	High Constable	
1999	With or Without You	Sammy	
2000	Harrison's Flowers	Samuel Brubeck	
2000	Proof of Life	Wyatt	
2001	The Mummy Returns	Baltus Hafez	
2001	Strictly Sinatra	Bill	
2003	It's All About Love	David	
2003	Paradise Found	Pissarro	
2004	Millions	Saint Peter	
2004	Van Helsing: The London Assignment	Cardinal Jinette	
2004	Van Helsing	Cardinal Jinette	
2005	Oliver Twist	Magistrate Fang	
2006	Eragon	Uncle Garrow	
2006	A Ticket Too Far	Dad	Short film
2012	The Lost Buoys	Tycoon	Music video
2016	Golden Years	Sid	
2018	Possum	Uncle Maurice	
2018	Funny Cow	Lenny	
2019	Cordelia	Roger	
2025	The Choral	Mr. Trickett	

=== Television ===
Year	Title	Role	Notes
1971	Advent of Steam	William Hedley	Episode: "The Iron Horse: Part 2"
1972	Dividing Fence	Geordie Gilroy	Part of the Full House on Tyneside live arts programme
1972	General Hospital	Ken Hartley	7 episodes
1972	New Scotland Yard	Ray Davies	Episode: "The Wrong 'Un"
1972	Villains	Terence 'Tel' Boldon	3 episodes
1973	Armchair 30	Glazier	Episode: "Ross Evans' Story"
1973	Hunter's Walk	Lorry Driver	Episode: "Discretion"
1973	Six Days of Justice	P.C. Williamson	Episode: "The Complaint"
1973	Softly, Softly: Task Force	David Miller	Episode: "A Quiet Man"
1973	Thriller	Mike	Episode: "The Eyes Have It"
1973–1977	Play for Today	Michael Biddle/First Docker/Mr. Briggs	3 episodes
1974	Father Brown	Joe	Episode: "The Hammer of God"
1974	Justice	Bob Graham	Episode: "It's Always a Gamble"
1974	Sporting Scenes	Bernie	Episode: "The Needle Match"
1974	Whatever Happened to the Likely Lads?	Dougie Scaife	Episode: "Conduct Unbecoming"
1975	Days of Hope	Billy Shepherd	TV miniseries
1975	Public Eye	Vince Gregson	Episode: "The Fatted Calf"
1975	The Squirrels	Jim	Episode: "The Favourite"
1975	The Stars Look Down	Joe Gowlan	TV miniseries
1975	The Sweeney	Peter Jenner	Episode: "Stay Lucky Eh?"
1976	Play of the Month	Lightborne / Secundus Demon	Episode: Chester Mystery Plays
1976	The New Avengers	Private George Harris	Episode: "Dirtier by the Dozen"
1977	Centre Play	Richard Clewes	Episode: "Risking It"
1977–1978	Play of the Week	Brodovich/Mikhalevich	2 episodes
1977	Porridge	Spraggon	Episode: "A Test of Character"
1977	Romance	Weaver	Episode: "House of Men"
1977	The Squirrels	Sweeney	Episode: "Shoulder to Shoulder"
1978	Enemy at the Door	Louis Mendoza	Episode: "Officers of the Law"
1978	Premiere		Episode: "Freedom of the Dig"
1978	Z-Cars	Detective Superintendent Boley	Episode: "Pressure"
1978–1979	A Sharp Intake of Breath	Various characters	Series 1–2: 13 episodes
1979	Six Plays by Alan Bennett	Dad	Episode: All Day on the Sand
1979	BBC Television Shakespeare	Provost	Episode: Measure for Measure
1980	Armchair Thriller	Trahearne	Episode: "Fear of God"
1981	Get Lost!	Neville Keaton	4 episodes
1981	One in a Thousand	Dick Hayes	Dramatized documentary
1982	The Life and Adventures of Nicholas Nickleby	Wackford Squeers; Mr. Wagstaff	Stage performance filmed for television
1983	Mr. Moon's Last Case	Narrator	TV play
1984	The Book Tower	Presenter	Children's programme; 7 episodes
1984	The House	Mr. Smeth	TV film
1984	Sharing Time	Luke	Episode: "Guilt on the Gingerbread"
1985	Bulman	DS Figg	Episode: "Death of a Hitman"
1987	Christmas Is Coming ... This Is a Government Health Warning!		Informational programme with comedy sketches
1988	Number 27	Murray Lester	
1988	The Storyteller	The Troll (voice)	Episode: "The True Bride"
1988	This is David Lander	Councillor Stennalling	Episode: "Not a Pretty Site"
1989	A Night on the Tyne	Willy	TV film
1989-1990	Screen One	Detective Superintendent Frank Burroughs/Evans	2 episodes
1990	Screenplay Firsts	Dick	Episode: Looking after Number One
1990	The Widowmaker	Dad	TV film
1991	Murder in Eden	Sergeant McGing	TV miniseries
1991	Stanley and the Women	Rufus Hilton	TV miniseries
1992	Goodbye Cruel World	Roy Grade	TV miniseries
1992	Inspector Morse	Superintendent Holdsby	Episode: "Happy Families"
1992	The Life and Times of Henry Pratt	Uncle Teddy	TV miniseries
1992	Married... with Children	Trevor	Episode "England Show"
1992	Shakespeare: The Animated Tales	Caliban (voice)	Episode: The Tempest
1993	Goggle-Eyes	Gerald Faulkner	TV miniseries
1994	Doggin' Around	Charlie Foster	TV film
1994	MacGyver: Trail to Doomsday	Chief Superintendent Capshaw	TV film
1995	Sorry about Last Night	Mickey	TV film
1996	Brazen Hussies	Jimmy Hardcastle	TV film
1996	Breaking the Code	Mick Ross	TV film
1996	Our Friends in the North	Austin Donohue	TV miniseries
1996	Tales from the Crypt	Inspector Herbert	Season 7, episode 12: "Confession"
1996	Witness Against Hitler	Pastor Harald Poelchau	TV film
1997	Underworld	Teddy Middlemass	6 episodes
1998	In the Red	DCI Frank Jefferson	TV miniseries
1998	Shell Shock	Narrator	3-part documentary
1999	Aristocrats	Henry Fox	TV miniseries
1999	David Copperfield	Daniel Peggotty	TV film
1999	Oliver Twist	Mr. Fleming	TV miniseries
2000	7Up 2000	Narrator	Documentary
2000	Challenger: Go for Launch	Narrator	Documentary
2000	This Is Personal: The Hunt for the Yorkshire Ripper	George Oldfield	TV film Nominated: Royal Television Society award
2001	Adrian Mole: The Cappuccino Years	George Mole	6 episodes
2001	Extinct	Narrator	6-part documentary
2001	Score	George Devon	TV film
2001	Waiters	Oscar	Part of the ITV First Cut series
2002	Bedtime	Neil Henshall	Series 2: 6 episodes
2002	Inquisition	Martin	TV film
2002	Sparkhouse	Richard Bolton	TV film
2003	Between the Sheets	Peter Delany	TV miniseries
2003	Messiah 2: Vengeance is Mine	DCI Charlie Macintyre	TV miniseries
2003–2013, 2015	New Tricks	Brian Lane	Series 1–10: 80 episodes
2004	Carrie's War	Samuel Evans	TV film
2004	When I'm 64	Jim	TV film
2005	Bleak House	Inspector Bucket	TV miniseries
2006	The Girls Who Came to Stay	Bob Jenkins	TV film Also known as The Girls of Belarus
2007	The Dinner Party	Jim	TV film
2008	Filth: The Mary Whitehouse Story	Ernest Whitehouse	TV film
2008	Little Dorrit	Jeremiah and Ephraim Flintwinch	TV miniseries
2009–2011	Garrow's Law	John Southouse	Series 1–3: 11 episodes
2010	A Passionate Woman	Donald	TV film (Part 2)
2012	The Mystery of Edwin Drood	Hiram Grewgious	TV film
2012	The Hollow Crown	Earl of Northumberland	TV films/series; Henry IV, Parts I and II
2014	Penny Dreadful	Vincent Brand	TV series
2014	Downton Abbey	Stowell	Series 5 Christmas special
2016	Frontier	Lord Benton	TV series
2016	Dark Angel	George Stott	TV series
2017	Prime Suspect: Tennison	Clifford Bentley	TV series
2019	Year of the Rabbit	Chief Inspector Wisbech	TV Mini Series
2020–2023	Breeders	Jim, Paul's father	TV series
2022	Sherwood	Gary Jackson	TV Mini Series
2023	Tom Jones	Squire Western	TV Mini Series
TBA	The Secret Diary of Adrian Mole Aged 13¾	Bert	TV Mini Series

=== Theatre ===
Year	Play	Playwright	Role	Theatre	Notes
1971	I Was Hitler's Maid	Christopher Wilkinson	Adolf Hitler	King's Head Theatre Club, London	
1971	The Changing Room	David Storey	Billy Spencer	Royal Court Theatre, London	
1973	Dracula	Bram Stoker; Stanley Eveling et al. (adaptation)	Renfield	Bush Theatre, London	
1973	A Fart for Europe	Howard Brenton; David Edgar	Edgar	Royal Court Theatre Upstairs, London	
1973	Cromwell	David Storey	Morgan; Wallace	Royal Court Theatre, London	
1975	As You Like It	William Shakespeare	Touchstone	Nottingham Playhouse	
1976	The Sons of Light	David Rudkin	Yescanab	University Theatre, Newcastle	
1976	Mother's Day	David Storey	Gordon	Royal Court Theatre, London	
1978	The Passion	Tony Harrison (adaptation)	Fourth Soldier	Cottesloe Theatre, London	
1978	One for the Road	Willy Russell	Dennis	National tour	Alternate titles: Dennis the Menace; Happy Returns
1979–1980	Much Ado About Nothing	William Shakespeare	Dogberry	Small-scale tour Donmar Warehouse, London	Royal Shakespeare Company
1979–1980	The Caucasian Chalk Circle	Bertolt Brecht	Azdak	Small-scale tour Donmar Warehouse, London	Royal Shakespeare Company
1980	Bastard Angel	Barrie Keeffe	Alun	Donmar Warehouse, London	Royal Shakespeare Company
1980	The Loud Boy's Life	Howard Barker	Harry Baker; Lionel Frontage; Norman Leathers	Donmar Warehouse, London	Royal Shakespeare Company
1981–1982	The Life and Adventures of Nicholas Nickleby	Charles Dickens; David Edgar (adaptation)	Wackford Squeers; Mr. Wagstaff	Aldwych Theatre, London; Plymouth Theatre, Broadway; Old Vic, London (filmed for TV)	Royal Shakespeare Company
1982–1983	The Tempest	William Shakespeare	Trinculo	Royal Shakespeare Theatre, Stratford; Theatre Royal, Newcastle; Barbican Theatre, London	Royal Shakespeare Company
1982–1983	The Taming of the Shrew	William Shakespeare	Petruchio	Royal Shakespeare Theatre, Stratford; Theatre Royal, Newcastle; Barbican Theatre, London	Royal Shakespeare Company
1983	The Roaring Girl	Thomas Middleton; Thomas Dekker	Ralph Trapdoor	Royal Shakespeare Theatre, Stratford; Barbican Theatre, London	Royal Shakespeare Company
1983	Reflections	Jasper Rootham	Performer	Gulbenkian Studio, Newcastle	Royal Shakespeare Company
1984	Serjeant Musgrave's Dance	John Arden	Private Hurst	Old Vic, London	
1984–1985	The Crucible	Arthur Miller	John Proctor	Small-scale tour Christ Church, Spitalfields; Polish tour	Royal Shakespeare Company; Nominated: Olivier Award
1984–1985	The Winter's Tale	William Shakespeare	Leontes	Small-scale tour Christ Church, Spitalfields; Polish tour	Royal Shakespeare Company; Nominated: Olivier Award
1985–1986	Troilus and Cressida	William Shakespeare	Thersites	Royal Shakespeare Theatre, Stratford; Barbican Theatre, London	Royal Shakespeare Company
1985–1986	Les Misérables	Claude-Michel Schönberg; Alain Boublil; Herbert Kretzmer	Thénardier	Barbican Theatre, London; Palace Theatre, London	Royal Shakespeare Company; Nominated: Olivier Award
1987–1988	Fashion	Doug Lucie	Stuart Clarke	The Other Place, Stratford; The Pit, London	Royal Shakespeare Company
1987–1988	The Jew of Malta	Christopher Marlowe	Barabas the Jew	Swan Theatre, Stratford; People's Theatre, Newcastle; Barbican Theatre, London	Royal Shakespeare Company; Nominated: Olivier Award
1988	The Father	August Strindberg	The Captain	Cottesloe Theatre, London	Nominated: Olivier Award
1989–1990	The Baker's Wife	Stephen Schwartz; Joseph Stein	Aimable Castagnet	Phoenix Theatre, London	Nominated: Olivier Award
1993	Sweeney Todd: The Demon Barber of Fleet Street	Stephen Sondheim; Hugh Wheeler	Sweeney Todd	Cottesloe Theatre, London	Won: Olivier Award
1995	Insignificance	Terry Johnson	Albert Einstein	Donmar Warehouse, London	
1995	Les Misérables: The Dream Cast in Concert	Claude-Michel Schönberg; Alain Boublil; Herbert Kretzmer	Thénardier	Royal Albert Hall, London	8 October 1995; Released on DVD
1996	Endgame	Samuel Beckett	Hamm	Donmar Warehouse, London	
1996–1997	Death of a Salesman	Arthur Miller	Willy Loman	Lyttelton Theatre, London	
1997–1998	The Front Page	Ben Hecht; Charles MacArthur	Walter Burns	Donmar Warehouse, London	
2002	Mappa Mundi	Shelagh Stephenson	Jack	Cottesloe Theatre, London	
2006	The Royal Hunt of the Sun	Peter Shaffer	Francisco Pizarro	Olivier Theatre, London	
2009	A House Not Meant to Stand	Tennessee Williams	Cornelius McCorkle	Donmar Warehouse, London	Rehearsed reading 14 September 2009
2012	My Fair Lady	Alan Lerner; Frederick Loewe	Alfred P. Doolittle	Royal Albert Hall, London	BBC Proms
2013	Family Voices; Victoria Station	Harold Pinter	Voice 3 Controller	Trafalgar Studios, London	
2014	Exit the King	Eugène Ionesco	King Berenger	Ustinov Studio, Theatre Royal, Bath	

=== Radio ===
- 2018 The Case of Charles Dexter Ward. BBC Radio 4.
