= Sonia Sutcliffe =

Former wife of serial killer Peter Sutcliffe (born 1950)

- Born: Oksana Szurma; 10 August 1950 (age 76); England
- Known for: Marriage to British serial killer Peter Sutcliffe; Libel case against Private Eye magazine
- Spouses: Peter Sutcliffe (m. 1974; div. 1994); Michael Woodward (m. 1997)

Sonia Szurma-Woodward (born Oksana Szurma; born 10 August 1950), known as Sonia Sutcliffe, is the former wife of the British serial killer Peter Sutcliffe.

== Marriage to Peter Sutcliffe ==
Sonia married Peter William Sutcliffe on 10 August 1974, her 24th birthday, two years after she began treatment for schizophrenia. When she found out that she could not have children due to previous miscarriages she went back to studying to be a teacher.

Her relationship with her husband was later characterised by the writer Gordon Burn as domineering, with Sonia willing to slap him down "like a naughty schoolboy". When her husband was found guilty of the murder of multiple women in 1981, Sonia remained married to him and continued to live in their Bradford matrimonial home. They separated around 1989 and divorced in July 1994 on grounds of unreasonable behaviour. Barbara Jones, a journalist who had numerous conversations with Sonia, described Sonia as the most irritating, strangest, and coldest person she had ever encountered. Jones noted that Sonia was incredibly prickly and demanding.

== Libel case against Private Eye ==
In May 1989, a libel action against the satirical magazine Private Eye, brought by Sutcliffe, came to court. Her decision to sue was made shortly before the limitation on such actions, then six years, was due to expire. The case concerned a January 1981 article that detailed her attempts to make financial deals with newspapers and claimed that she was attempting to profit from her husband's crimes. Private Eye admitted at the time that it had made two errors in the article, but the plaintiff (Sutcliffe) rejected the offer of a correction.

At the end of the trial on 24 May, Sutcliffe was awarded record libel damages against the magazine of £600,000, which was £100,000 more than the previous highest amount ever paid for libel in Britain. The editor, Ian Hislop, stated that "If that's justice, I'm a banana", and announced his immediate intention to appeal. A crowd-sourced fund named "Bananaballs" was successfully set up to pay for the appeal's legal costs and the damages were eventually reduced to £60,000. Two other newspapers Sutcliffe had sued, the Daily Express and the Daily Star, settled with her out of court.

One other newspaper which formed part of her legal action, the News of the World, did not settle. When the case came to court in December 1990, details emerged which demonstrated she had benefitted financially from her husband's crimes. In court, George Carman, the newspaper's QC, described her as "dancing on the graves of her husband's victims". The jury found for the News of the World, and she was ordered to pay both sides' legal costs.

== Later life ==
Following Szurma's divorce from Sutcliffe, Szurma married hairdresser Michael Woodward on 2 May 1997.
