= Ronald Gregory =

British police officer

Chief Constable Ronald Gregory CBE QPM DL
- Gregory in 1980
- Born: 23 October 1921; Preston, Lancashire, England
- Died: 9 April 2010 (aged 88)
- Police career
- Force: Plymouth City Police; Devon and Cornwall Police; West Yorkshire Constabulary; West Yorkshire Police
- Service years: 1941–1983
- Rank: Chief Constable
- Military career
- Allegiance: United Kingdom
- Branch: Royal Air Force Volunteer Reserve; Royal Naval Volunteer Reserve
- Service years: 1942–1944 (RAFVR); 1944–1946 (RNVR)
- Rank: Flying officer Sub-lieutenant
- Unit: Fleet Air Arm
- Conflicts: Second World War

Ronald Gregory, CBE, QPM, DL (23 October 1921 – 9 April 2010) was a British police officer who served as chief constable of West Yorkshire Constabulary and then West Yorkshire Police from 1969 to 1983. He was head of the police force during its five-year manhunt for the Yorkshire Ripper, Peter Sutcliffe.

Having been born in Preston, Lancashire, Gregory served in the Royal Air Force Volunteer Reserve and the Fleet Air Arm, Royal Naval Volunteer Reserve during the Second World War. Having returned to civilian life in 1946, he served as a police officer and detective in his home town of Preston. In 1962 or 1963, he was appointed deputy chief constable of Blackpool. He was then chief constable of Plymouth City Police before becoming deputy chief constable of the newly created Devon and Cornwall Police. In 1969, he became chief constable of West Yorkshire Constabulary, where he would spend the rest of his career.

== Early life ==
Gregory was born on 23 October 1921 in Preston, Lancashire, England. He came from a family of policemen: his father, grandfather and great-grandfather had been officers. He was educated at Harris College, known for its vocational and technical courses.

=== Military service ===
In 1942, at the age of 20, Gregory volunteered to join the Royal Air Force Volunteer Reserve (RAFVR) to serve in the Second World War. He then underwent aircrew training in South Africa. On 18 December 1943, having reached the rank of leading aircraftman, he was granted an emergency commission as a pilot officer on probation in the RAFVR. On 18 June 1944, his commission was confirmed and he was promoted to flying officer (war substantive).

He transferred to the Fleet Air Arm as an officer of the Royal Naval Volunteer Reserve (RNVR) on 21 November 1944. He was granted the rank of temporary sub-lieutenant (A) with seniority from 18 December 1943. With the RNVR, he saw active service in the Far East. He flew Hellcats and Corsairs while being based on the aircraft carriers HMS Ameer (D01) and HMS Empress (D42). In July 1945, he was shot down over Phuket Island by the Japanese: after an emergency landing offshore, the injured Gregory swam out to sea while under heavy fire, before being rescued by a Walrus flying boat. He was demobilised in 1946.

== Police career ==
Gregory began his policing career as a police cadet with the Blackpool borough force before joining Preston borough police as a constable in 1941. After completing his probationary period, he left the police to serve in the military for the rest of the Second World War. He was demobilised in 1946 and returned to Preston to continue his police career. He became a detective, and rose through the ranks of CID until he was a detective chief inspector.

In 1962 or 1963, he became a chief officer, having been appointed deputy chief constable of Blackpool. He became chief constable of Plymouth City Police in 1965. However, only two years later, the city police was merged with its neighbouring forces into Devon and Cornwall Police; he became deputy chief constable of the new force in 1967 or 1968.

In 1969, Gregory began his final police appointment: as chief constable of West Yorkshire Constabulary. Due to government restructuring, the city constabularies of Leeds and Bradford were merged into the wider county force in 1973, enlarging his constabulary and remit: this new force was called the West Yorkshire Metropolitan Police. This amalgamation created tensions and split loyalties throughout the force in the early years, and were cited as a major cause of issue relating to the hunt for the 'Yorkshire Ripper'. He introduced a number of innovations to the force, including armed response mobile units, VASCAR speed detectors in patrol cars, and a motorway patrol unit.

On 30 October 1975, Peter Sutcliffe killed the first of his 13 known victims: 28-year-old Wilma Mary McCann from Scott Hall, Leeds. Sutcliffe would not be arrested until January 1981, after which he confessed to 13 murders. Gregory directly contributed to the delay in finding Sutcliffe through his support of the 'Wearside Jack' cassette tape and letters; these were later revealed to be a hoax but diverted detectives for two years into chasing a non-existent lead. The associated press and poster campaign which was fronted by Gregory himself cost the inquiry almost £1 million. That line of inquiry produced "100 per cent rubbish", and, in July 1979, Sutcliffe was interviewed for the fifth time but was dismissed as a suspect because his voice and handwriting did not fit 'Wearside Jack'. Sutcliffe would go on to kill at least three more women. He was finally arrested on 2 January 1981 by a neighbouring force for a traffic offence, although further investigation of the scene the following day revealed a hammer and knife: the 'Yorkshire Ripper' had been found and Sutcliffe readily confessed to 13 murders. Gregory swiftly called a triumphant press conference, stating that he was "delighted with developments at this stage" and announcing the immediate scaling-down of the Ripper manhunt. This would become known as the "laughing policeman" press conference, and he was criticised for both his jubilant behaviour and the possibility of prejudicing Sutcliffe's future trial.

The later inquiry into the manhunt's failings was highly critical of Gregory's decision to appoint George Oldfield as senior investigating officer: he only undertook the role part-time in addition to his duties as assistant chief constable (crime), and he was not considered to have had the professional competence and charisma to effectively lead such a large inquiry. In addition, when Oldfield took ill in 1979, Gregory was found to have not acted swiftly enough to ensure a clear replacement was appointed.

Gregory retired early from the police in 1983, two years after Sutcliffe was apprehended. He sold his memoirs to the Mail on Sunday for a reported £40,000 (equivalent to £136,000 in 2025). This was widely criticised with the families of Sutcliffe's victims describing it as "blood money", Leon Brittan, the Home Secretary, called it "deplorable", and the Police Review called him a hypocrite. One survivor of an attack by Sutcliffe was only awarded £17,000 in compensation after a long legal fight, and as chief constable he had banned his officers from speaking to the press.

== Personal life ==
In 1942, Gregory married Grace Ellison. Together they had two sons.

Gregory spent much of his retirement living in Portugal. He died on 9 April 2010, aged 88.

== Honours ==

In the 1971 New Year Honours, Gregory was awarded the Queen's Police Medal for Distinguished Service (QPM) in recognition of his work as chief constable of West Yorkshire Constabulary. In 1977, he was made a Deputy Lieutenant (DL) to the Lord Lieutenant of West Yorkshire. In the 1980 Queen's Birthday Honours, he was appointed Commander of the Order of the British Empire (CBE) in recognition of his work as chief constable of West Yorkshire Metropolitan Police.

== In popular culture ==
Gregory is portrayed by Michael McElhatton in The Long Shadow (2023).
