= Ford Estate =

Coordinates: 54.903°N 1.423°W

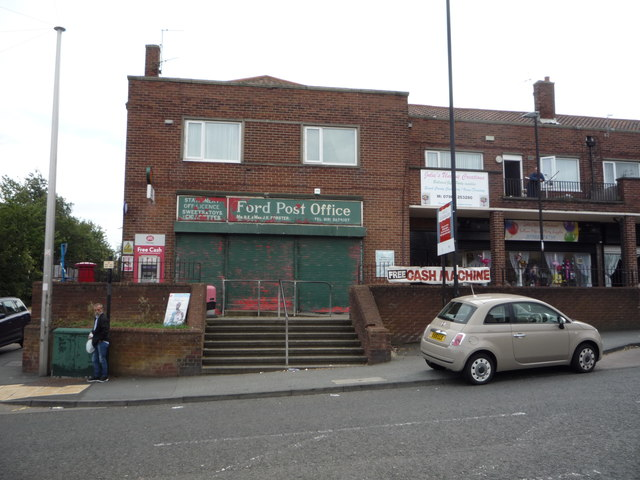
- Ford Post Office

- Location within Tyne and Wear
- Metropolitan borough: Sunderland
- Metropolitan county: Tyne and Wear
- Region: North East
- Country: England
- Sovereign state: United Kingdom
- Post town: SUNDERLAND
- Postcode district: SR4
- Dialling code: 0191
- Police: Northumbria
- Fire: Tyne and Wear
- Ambulance: North East
- UK Parliament: Sunderland Central

Ford Estate (known as Ford locally) is a suburb in the south of Sunderland, in the county of Tyne and Wear, England. The suburb is divided into two areas: High Ford borders the estate of Pennywell. Low Ford, to the east, borders the suburb of Pallion. Much like the neighbouring estate of Pennywell, Ford Estate is currently undergoing large levels of urban regeneration with private housing now standing in the place of the homes people were forcibly evicted from.

At the heart of the area once stood Ford Hall (after which the area is named), the childhood home of General Havelock, and a road is named after him near the site as well as a few public houses outside the suburb. The house was demolished in the middle of the twentieth century and was rebuilt as a retirement home.

Most of the houses in Ford Estate were built in the 1930s and 1940s, and most of the street names begin with the letter F, and also contain the word ford in them, examples of this are Falmouth Road, Fordham Road, Fordfield Road and Falkland Road.

Residents also have access to the nearby Pallion Metro Station which is located in Pallion.

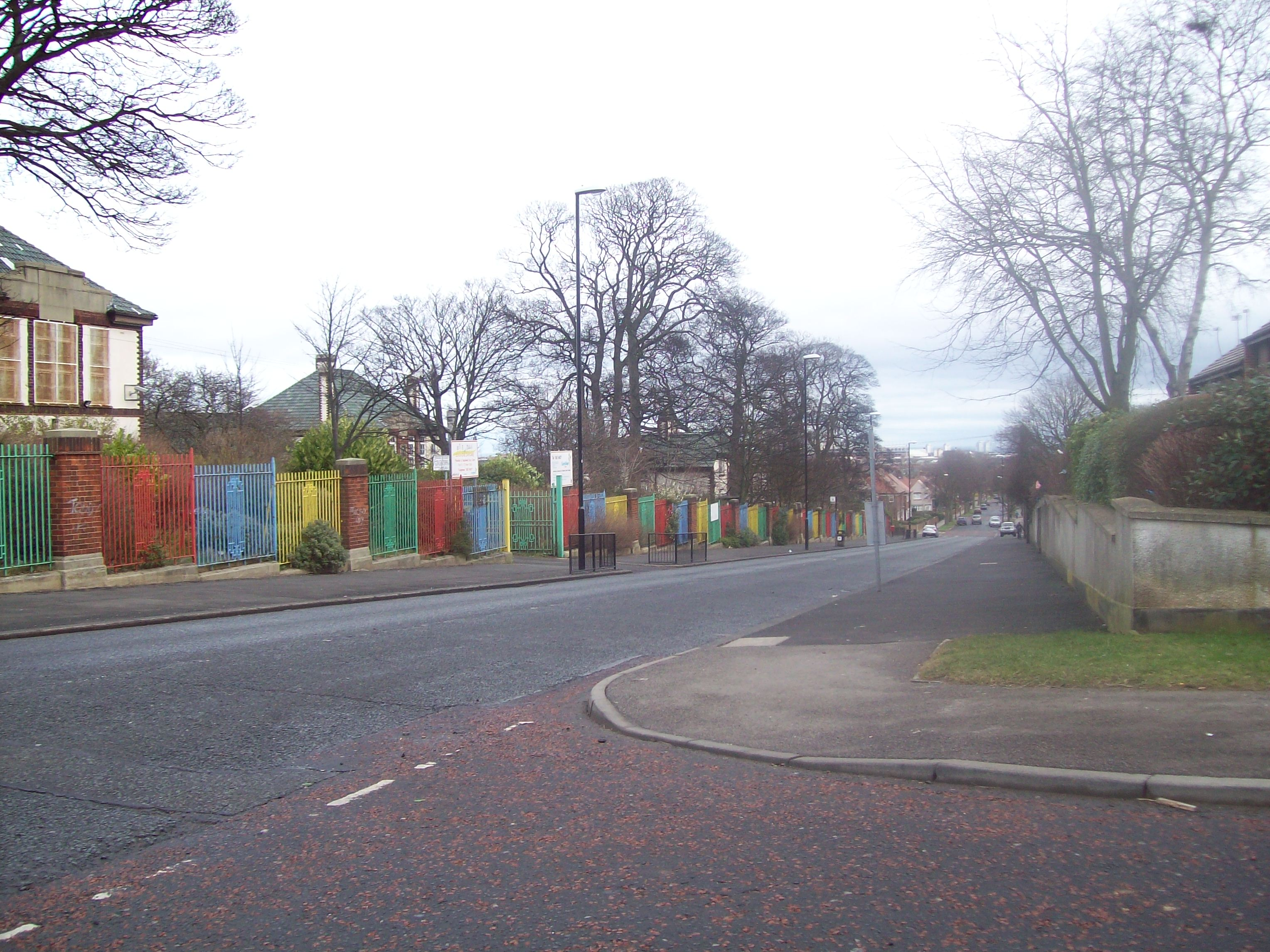
Looking east towards Low Ford from the top of Fordhall Bank (now the site of a residential home).

== History ==
Ford was formerly a township and chapelry in the parish of Bishop-Wearmouth, in 1866 Ford became a separate civil parish, on 1 April 1967 the parish was abolished and merged with Sunderland and Houghton-le-Spring. In 1961 the parish had a population of 3071.
