= George Oldfield (police officer) =

British police officer (1923–1985)

- Born: Godfrey Alexander Oldfield; 10 October 1923; Monk Fryston, West Riding of Yorkshire, England
- Died: 4 July 1985 (aged 61); Pinderfields Hospital, Wakefield, West Yorkshire, England
- Spouse: Margaret Curtis (m. 1954)
- Police career
- Rank: Assistant Chief Constable for the West Yorkshire Police

Godfrey Alexander Oldfield (10 October 1923 – 4 July 1985), known as George Oldfield, was a British police detective who finished his career as an Assistant Chief Constable with West Yorkshire Police. He is known for leading inquiries by the force into major crimes, including the M62 coach bombing and the 'Yorkshire Ripper' series of murders; the latter inquiry put great strain on his health. In recent years Oldfield's reputation has come under scrutiny, particularly concerning his two major cases, and has resulted in allegations of corruption and incompetence.

== Early life ==
Oldfield was born and raised in the farming community of Monk Fryston, a small village in the West Riding of Yorkshire a few miles from Castleford. His siblings included twin brothers. He attended Archbishop Holgate's School in York. During his time there he became known by the name George, as he had disliked his birth name of 'Godfrey'. Throughout his life his family called him 'Goff'. In 1954 Oldfield married Margaret Curtis; they had four children, one of whom died of leukaemia.

Oldfield joined the West Riding Police in 1947, specialising in the Criminal Investigation Department (CID), where he rose through the ranks. Oldfield was said to have possessed a gruff and blunt personality.

== Notable criminal cases ==
=== M62 Bombing ===
In February 1974, Oldfield, then a Detective Chief Superintendent and head of the West Yorkshire CID, took command of the investigation into an Irish Republican Army bomb which killed 12 people travelling on board a coach carrying members of the British armed services and their families on the M62 motorway on 4 February. He immediately made contact with the Garda Síochána and ordered forensic tests on the wreckage on the motorway. On 19 February the investigation charged Judith Ward with the bombing after she confessed and Griess tests on her hands indicated contact with explosives. Although she later retracted her confession, Ward was convicted of the bombing on 4 November 1974 and sentenced to 30 years' imprisonment.

The success of obtaining a conviction and heavy sentence for Ward provided a significant boost to Oldfield's reputation, and on 27 May 1976 he was promoted to be Assistant Chief Constable for Crime at West Yorkshire Police.

However the M62 investigation would prove to be rushed, careless and ultimately forged, but culminated in Ward claiming culpability for the M62 coach bombing and two separate, non-fatal explosions.

Initially, Ward was questioned by two members of the Metropolitan Police Service at Wakefield's Police Training College. The conclusion of the Detective Inspector and Detective Constable following the first of their three interviews with Ward on 16 February was that she held "poor knowledge" of the construction of explosive devices and, although discrepancies were noted between the various oral statements Ward made and earlier statements she and others had provided to investigators, by 7:45 p.m., Ward had provided a written confession claiming culpability for the M62 coach bombing. She would initially be charged with conspiracy to cause an explosion on the M62 motorway on 18 February.

By 25 February, West Yorkshire investigators had established that Ward's employment with a travelling circus had taken her to the market town of Chipping Norton in the Cotswold Hills on 3 February. Over a dozen independent witnesses were able to confirm this fact, thus meaning Ward could not have physically placed the bomb upon the coach as she had previously claimed. The following day, in the presence of Oldfield, Ward wrote a confession claiming culpability for transporting the explosives used in the September 1973 Euston bombing.

The following month, Ward was shown a written copy of the statement she had provided on 16 February. She emphatically denied sections of the statement, insisting several claims she had supposedly made had been fabricated by investigators, although she did concede she had made some false claims regarding transporting what she believed to be explosives in a direct response to pressure from Detective Superintendent Moffatt.

On 11 and 18 June, after Ward had been formally charged with various atrocities including the M62 coach bombing and without the knowledge of her solicitor, Oldfield again questioned Ward. The records of these interviews were removed from police files and transferred to the Metropolitan Police Service for security reasons. Early the following month, Ward attempted suicide by cutting her wrist shortly after being diagnosed with severe depression and on 24 August, a night orderly officer observed her attempting to injure her wrists by incessantly rubbing them against her bed straps.

Several years after Oldfield's death, Ward's conviction was overturned as the forensic tests were discredited and her confession found to be the product of mental illness. In overturning the conviction, the Court of Appeal strongly criticised Oldfield for not disclosing a series of interviews with Ward to her defence team.

=== Yorkshire Ripper inquiry ===
As Assistant Chief Constable, Oldfield took the lead in the police inquiry when, starting in 1975, several women were found murdered or horrifically injured in Leeds and Bradford. When new attacks were linked with the same inquiry, Oldfield confirmed that the police believed they were being committed by the same man. From the fact that the murderer attacked and mutilated women, some of whom were associated with prostitution, the nickname "Yorkshire Ripper" came to be applied to that person. Oldfield devoted himself to investigating these crimes, working long hours and taking little leave.

In June 1979, at a press conference, Oldfield publicised a tape recording and letters received by the police in which Wearside Jack, a hoaxer, taunted Oldfield personally for being unable to catch him and claimed to be the murderer. Oldfield was convinced that the real murderer had been in contact and spent a great deal of time in the Northeast around Sunderland, as the accent of the man on the tape was determined to come from the Castletown area in the town.

On 6 August 1979 Oldfield was taken ill with what was then described as a chest infection. He was off work for more than four months. When he returned it was acknowledged that he had had a heart attack and did not return to the Ripper investigation.

The arrest of Peter Sutcliffe by South Yorkshire Police in Sheffield in January 1981 led to the discovery that he was the Yorkshire Ripper. Sutcliffe was from West Yorkshire and had no connection to Sunderland. Hence, it became apparent that the letters and tape had been a distraction from the hunt for the murderer. Oldfield did not attend Sutcliffe's trial at the Old Bailey in London; he still believed, although Sutcliffe had not written the letters or read the taped message, that there was a strong connection between them and the murder inquiry.

On 5 June 1981, Oldfield was transferred from the CID to take charge of operational support. West Yorkshire Police insisted that he was not being sacked or demoted but moved to less onerous duties due to his health. In February 1982, he was moved to be Assistant Chief Constable in charge of the Western Division, based at Bradford.

== Retirement and death ==
In 1983, Oldfield had a second heart attack and was off work for several months. During this time, Chief Constable Ronald Gregory praised his officers who had worked hard and whose health had suffered under the pressure, including media criticism. The remark was interpreted as referring principally to Oldfield. It was announced in July 1983 that Oldfield was to retire at the end of August due to ill health.

Oldfield died on 4 July 1985, aged 61, at Pinderfields Hospital in Wakefield, of congestive heart failure.
