= MacDonald (surname) =

MacDonald, Macdonald, McDonald
- Pronunciation: mɨkdɒnəld
- Language: Irish Gaelic and Scottish Gaelic

Origin
- Meaning: "Son of Dòmhnall"
- Region of origin: Ireland, Scotland

Other names
- Variant forms: Donald, Donaldson (surname), McDonnell, MacDonnell, McDonell MacDonell, McConnell, MacConnell

MacDonald, Macdonald, and McDonald are surnames of both Irish and Scottish origin. In the Scottish Gaelic and Irish languages they are patronymic, referring to an ancestor with given name Donald.

== Origins and variants ==
The surname is an Anglicised form of the Scottish Gaelic and Irish Gaelic MacDhòmhnaill or Dòmhnallach. The name is a patronym meaning 'son of Dòmhnall'. The personal name Dòmhnall is composed of the elements domno 'world' and val 'might rule'. According to Alex Woolf, the Gaelic personal name is probably a borrowing from the British Celtic Dyfnwal.

In the context of Scottish clans, the various forms of the name refer to one of the largest clans, Clan Donald. In Ireland the name is largely from this root but may sometimes be a synonym for MacDonnell, which itself may be of distinct Scottish Clan Donald galloglass or native Irish origins.

== Frequency and distribution ==
In Scottish surname data, no distinction is made between, for instance, "Macdonald" and "MacDonald". According to these data, the following frequency information can be collated:

Year(s)	Macdonald Rank	%freq	McDonald Rank	%freq
1855–1858	2	1.23	<50	<0.30
1935	2	1.03	<50	<0.28
1958	3	0.98	<50	<0.26
1976	10	0.59	23	0.40
1990	10	0.55	32	0.35
1999–2001	9	0.55	24	0.37
2014	10	0.51	30	0.32

Table references

Frequency data from England of 1891 shows a concentration of families bearing the "Macdonald" surname in Lancashire and Yorkshire with a lower frequency in the northernmost counties, but overall widespread distribution throughout the country. "McDonald" shares the same pattern of distribution. In contemporaneous data from the United States, coast-to-coast distribution of both "Macdonald" and "McDonald" appears in 1880. Looking back to 1840 in the United States, the prevalence of "McDonald" is far greater than that of "Macdonald", with concentration in the Ohio-Pennsylvania-New York corridor.

== Notable people: MacDonald surname ==
=== Born before 1400 ===
- Aonghus Mór (died c. 1293), son of Domhnall mac Raghnaill, and first MacDonald
- Aonghus Óg of Islay (died 1314 × 1318/c. 1330), Chief of Clan Donald and ally of Robert the Bruce
- John of Islay, Lord of the Isles (died 1386), First Lord of the Isles and Chief of Clan Donald
- Donald of Islay, Lord of the Isles (died 1423), Second Lord of the Isles
- Alexander of Islay, Earl of Ross (died 1449), Third Lord of the Isles

=== Born after 1400 ===
- John of Islay, Earl of Ross (1434–1503), or "John MacDonald", Scottish ruler, Fourth Lord of the Isles
- Aonghas Óg (died 1490), bastard son of John of Islay and last of the MacDonald Lords of the Isles
- Alasdair Mac Colla (1610–1647), or Sir Alexander MacDonald, Scottish/Irish military commander

=== Born after 1700 ===
- Flora MacDonald (1722–1790), Jacobite patriot who protected Bonnie Prince Charlie after the 1746 Battle of Culloden
- John MacDonald of Garth (1771–1866), Scottish emigrant to Canada, early partner in the North West Company
- John Small MacDonald (c. 1791 – 1849), Canadian businessman and provincial politician

=== Born after 1800 ===
- Annie MacDonald (1832–1897), British courtier, lady's maid to Queen Victoria of Great Britain
- A. B. MacDonald (1871–1942), American journalist
- Beatrice Mary MacDonald (1881–1969), American Army nurse during World War I
- Bob MacDonald (golfer) (1885–1960), Scottish-American golfer
- Claude Maxwell MacDonald (1852–1915), British soldier and diplomat
- Elizabeth Roberts MacDonald (1864–1922), Canadian writer, suffragist
- George MacDonald (1824–1905), Scottish-English author, poet, and Christian minister
- Hector MacDonald (1853–1903), Scottish Major-General of the British Army under Lord Kitchener
- John L. MacDonald (1838–1903), Scottish-American national politician
- Pirie MacDonald (1867–1942), American portrait photographer
- Ramsay MacDonald (1866–1937), Scottish politician, twice Prime Minister of the United Kingdom
- Ranald MacDonald (1834–1894), Scottish-Chinook educator. First man to teach the English language in Japan
- William Josiah MacDonald (1873–1946), American lawyer and national politician
- William Myron MacDonald (1890–1958), American-Canadian military pilot

=== Born after 1900 ===
- J. Clifford MacDonald (1901–1963), American businessman and philanthropist
- Jeanette MacDonald (1903–1965), American singer and actress
- Jimmy MacDonald (sound effects artist) (1906–1991), Scottish-born American sound designer at Disney
- James Macdonald (ornithologist) (1908–2002), Scottish-Australian ornithologist
- Ian MacDonald (actor) (1914–1978), American actor and director during the 1940s and 1960s
- Ross Macdonald (1915–1983), pseudonym of the American-Canadian writer Kenneth Millar
- John D. MacDonald (1916–1986), American novelist
- Virginia B. MacDonald (1920–2008), American politician
- Charles B. MacDonald (1922–1990), American World War II soldier and military historian
- Raymond M. MacDonald (1923–2015), American politician
- Flora MacDonald (politician) (1926–2015), Canadian politician
- Peter MacDonald (Navajo leader) (born 1928), former chairman of the Navajo Nation
- Robert David MacDonald (1929–2004), Scottish playwright, director and translator
- Lowell MacDonald (1941–2025), Canadian ice hockey player
- Jeffrey R. MacDonald (born 1943), American murderer
- Margo MacDonald (1943–2014), Scottish politician
- Kevin B. MacDonald (born 1944), American psychology academic
- Marcia Lee Macdonald (born 1944), American photographer
- Ralph MacDonald (1944–2011), American percussionist, songwriter
- Linda MacDonald (born 1946), American multimedia artist and quilter
- L. Ian MacDonald (born 1947), Canadian author, columnist, broadcaster, and diplomat

=== Born after 1950 ===
- Alan MacDonald (rugby union) (born 1985), Scottish rugby union player
- Andrew MacDonald (ice hockey) (born 1986), Canadian ice hockey player
- Andrew McDonald (water polo) (born 1955), American water polo player
- Ann-Marie MacDonald (born 1958), Canadian playwright, novelist, actor and broadcast journalist
- Duck MacDonald Andrew Duck MacDonald (born 1953), American heavy metal/hard rock guitarist
- Fiona MacDonald (born 1974), Scottish curler
- Garry MacDonald (born 1962), English footballer
- Heidi MacDonald, American comic book editor and comics critic
- Jacob MacDonald (born 1993), American ice hockey player
- Jason MacDonald (born 1975), Canadian mixed martial artist
- Jayne MacDonald (died 1977), English female murder victim
- Kevin MacDonald (footballer) (born 1960), Scottish footballer
- Kiaran MacDonald (born 1997), English boxer
- Kirk MacDonald (ice hockey) (born 1983), Canadian ice hockey player
- Kirk MacDonald (politician) (born 1975), member of the Legislative Assembly of New Brunswick
- Kristen McDonald Rivet (born 1970), member of the United States House of Representatives
- Linda MacDonald (activist), Canadian activist against Non-State Torture
- Mike MacDonald (comedian) (1954–2018), Canadian comedian and actor
- Mike MacDonald (rugby union) (born 1980), American rugby union player
- Ray MacDonald (born 1977), Thai actor, adventurer, television presenter, host
- Roddie MacDonald (born 1954), Scottish footballer
- Roddy (R.S.) MacDonald (born 1956), Scottish-Australian Pipe Major and composer
- Rory MacDonald (fighter) (born 1989), Canadian mixed martial artist
- Shaun MacDonald (born 1988), Welsh footballer
- Tom MacDonald (rapper) (born 1988), Canadian rapper, songwriter
- William J. Macdonald (filmmaker), American television writer and producer

== Notable people: Macdonald surname ==
=== Born after 1700 ===
- Allan Macdonald (1794–1862), New York politician
- Lawrence Macdonald (1799 – c. 1870), Scottish sculptor
- Étienne Macdonald (1765–1840), Marshal of the Empire

=== Born after 1800 ===
- John Sandfield Macdonald (1812–1872), Canadian national politician, First Premier of Ontario
- Sir John A. Macdonald (1815–1891), Scottish-Canadian national politician, father of Confederation and the first Prime Minister of Canada
- Donald Alexander Macdonald (1817–1896), Canadian national politician
- John Macdonald (Canadian politician) (1824–1890), Scottish-Canadian merchant, churchman, philanthropist
- William Christoper Macdonald (1831–1917), Scottish-Canadian tobacco manufacturer, philanthropist
- Captain Murdo Stewart MacDonald (1852–1938), Scottish sailor, the last Sea Baron, Lloyd's Surveyor of Shipping
- Charles Blair Macdonald (1855–1939), American golfer, introduced the first 18-hole course in the United States
- C. Leslie Macdonald (1856–1929), Australian racehorse owner
- Isabella Macdonald Macdonald (1856–1947), British physician
- Alexander Macdonald (New York politician) (1867–1935), American politician and conservationist
- John Smyth Macdonald (1867–1941), British physiologist
- Harry Macdonough (born John Macdonald, 1871–1931), Canadian singer and recording executive
- John Alexander Macdonald (Prince Edward Island politician) (1874–1948), Canadian national politician
- William Alexander Macdonald (fl. 1890s), Canadian provincial politician
- William Ross Macdonald (1891–1976), Canadian national politician
- Ab Macdonald Albert Macdonald (1896 – after 1967), South Australian horse trainer

=== Born after 1900 ===
- Archibald 'Archie' James Florence Macdonald (1904–1983), British Liberal MP
- Barbara Macdonald (1913–2000), American social worker, lesbian feminist and ageism activist
- Dwight Macdonald (1906–1982), American writer, editor, social critic, philosopher, and political radical
- Eleanor Josephine Macdonald (1906–2007), pioneer American cancer epidemiologist and cancer researcher
- John Michael Macdonald (1906–1997), Canadian national politician
- Jack Macdonald (sportsman) (1908–1982), New Zealand rower
- James David Macdonald (ornithologist) (1908–2002), British and Australian ornithologist
- Margaret Mary Macdonald (1910–1968), Canadian national politician
- Callum Macdonald (1912–1999), Scottish publisher who specialised in poetry
- James David Macdonald (politician) (1922–1995), Canadian politician
- Ian G. Macdonald (1928–2023), English mathematician, a prominent contributor to algebraic combinatorics
- Ian Macdonald (Australian politician, born 1945), Australian national politician
- Ian Macdonald (New South Wales politician) (born 1949), Australian state politician

=== Born after 1950 ===
- Dame Mary Macdonald (born 1950), British head teacher, honoured for services to education
- Amy MacDonald (writer) (born 1951), American writer and journalist
- Ken Macdonald (born 1953), British barrister, Director of Public Prosecutions
- Norm Macdonald (1959–2021), Canadian comedian, writer and actor
- Sarah Macdonald (journalist) (born 1966), Australian journalist
- Kevin Macdonald (director) (born 1967), Scottish film director
- Shona Macdonald (born 1969), Scottish artist
- Shauna MacDonald (Canadian actress) (born 1970), Canadian actress and filmmaker
- Kelly Macdonald (born 1976), Scottish actress
- Shauna Macdonald (Scottish actress) (born 1981), Scottish stage, television and film actress
- Alice Macdonald (born 1983), English politician
- Amy Macdonald (born 1987), Scottish singer/songwriter
- Ross Macdonald (born 1989), bassist for The 1975
- Nene Macdonald (born 1994), Papua New Guinean Rugby League player
- Louise Macdonald (active 2020s), charity leader in Scotland, national director of the Institute of Directors in Scotland

== Notable people: McDonald surname ==
=== Born after 1800 ===
- Ambrose Stephen McDonald (1845–1913), American businessman and politician
- Eugene F. McDonald (1886–1958), American entrepreneur, founder of Zenith Radio
- Harl McDonald (1899–1955), American composer, pianist, conductor and teacher
- Ian Donald Roy McDonald (1898–1920), British World War I flying ace
- Jack McDonald (ice hockey, born 1887) (died 1958), Canadian ice hockey player
- James Grover McDonald (1886–1964), American diplomat, first Ambassador to Israel
- John McDonald (of Dromod) (1846–1932), Irish cultural nationalist poet
- Winifred McDonald (1888–1976), Secretary of the State of Connecticut

=== Born after 1900 ===
- Albert McDonald (1930–2014), American politician
- Archie P. McDonald (1935–2012), American Texan historian
- Arthur B. McDonald (born 1943), Canadian astrophysicist
- Arthur McDonald (1903–1996), British West Indian-English Royal Air Force Air Marshal
- Barry McDonald (rugby union) (1940–2020), Australian rugby union player
- Christopher W. McDonald (1931–2011), British footballer and businessman in Japan
- Colin McDonald (footballer, born 1930) (1930–2026), English footballer
- Country Joe McDonald (1942–2026), American singer/songwriter, musician, film composer, and activist
- Ian McDonald (musician) (1946–2012), English rock musician
- Janet McDonald (mathematician) (1905–2006), American mathematician, Vassar College professor emerita
- John P. McDonald (1922–1993), American librarian
- K. J. McDonald (1930–2012), American politician
- Larry McDonald (1935–1983), member of the United States House of Representatives
- Laurier McDonald (1931–2025), Texas Attorney, historian, author
- Mac McDonald (born 1949), American actor
- Marie McDonald (1923–1965), American film actress
- Martha McDonald (born 1964), American artist
- Maurice McDonald (1902–1971), American fast food pioneer and co-founder of McDonald's
- Parker Lee McDonald (1924–2017), American judge
- Richard McDonald (1909–1998), American fast food pioneer and co-founder of McDonald's
- Roy McDonald (poet) (1937–2018), Canadian poet and busker
- Roy McDonald (politician) (born 1946), New York State Senator
- Sandy McDonald (1937–2016), Scottish Minister of the Church of Scotland
- Susan Marshall McDonald (1918–1992), philatelist of Ohio
- Susann McDonald (1935–2025), American classical harpist
- Toby McDonald (1949 or 1950–2025), Canadian curler
- Trevor McDonald (born George McDonald, 1939), Trinidadian-born British news presenter
- W. Ian McDonald (1933–2006), New Zealand neurologist, academic, and specialist in multiple sclerosis
- Walt McDonald (1934–2022), American poet, academic, Poet Laureate of Texas
- Wesley L. McDonald (1924–2009), United States Navy Four Star Admiral and naval aviator
- Whitey McDonald (1902–1956), Canadian soccer player
- William Joseph McDonald (1904–1989), Irish-born American Catholic bishop

=== Born after 1950 ===
- Aari McDonald (born 1998), American basketball player
- Amy McDonald (Scottish footballer) (born 1985), Scottish football player/coach
- Ariel McDonald (born 1972), American-Slovenian basketball player
- Audra McDonald (born 1970), American actress and singer
- Andy McDonald (politician) (born 1958), British Labour Party
- Andy McDonald (ice hockey) (born 1977), Canadian player
- Barry McDonald (gymnast) (born 1971), Irish gymnast
- Blake McDonald (born 1990), American racing driver
- CeCe McDonald (born 1989), American LGBT activist
- Chris McDonald (footballer) (born 1975), Scottish footballer
- Christopher McDonald (born 1955), American actor
- Christopher McDonald (jurist) (born 1974), American judge
- Clayton McDonald (born 1988), English footballer
- Cole McDonald (born 1998), American football player
- Cooper McDonald (born 2001), American football player
- Daniel McDonald (actor) (1960–2007), American actor
- Darnell McDonald (died 2003), Belizean shooting victim
- David Tennant (born David John McDonald, 1971), Scottish actor
- D. K. McDonald, American football player and coach
- Elizabeth McDonald (born 1985), American artist
- Hayley McDonald (born 2008), Canadian ice hockey player
- Hugh McDonald (American musician) (born 1950), American musician, bassist
- Ian McDonald (author) (born 1960), British science fiction novelist
- Joanne McDonald (born 1952), Canadian wheelchair sport athlete
- Joe McDonald (politician) (born 1966), American politician
- John McDonald (born 1974), American baseball player
- Kathryn McDonald, American medical scientist
- Kayden McDonald (born 2005), American football player
- Kevin McDonald (born 1961), Canadian comedian and actor
- Kevin McDonald (footballer, born 1985), English footballer
- Kevin McDonald (footballer, born 1988), Scottish footballer
- Lanny McDonald (born 1953), Canadian ice hockey player
- Mackenzie McDonald (born 1995), American tennis player
- Mark McDonald (politician) (born 1980), Scottish politician
- Margaret McDonald (voice actress) (born 1988), American voice actress
- Marlene McDonald (1959–2023), Trinidad and Tobago politician
- Meg McDonald (footballer) (born 1991), Australian rules footballer
- Mickey McDonald (born 1995), American baseball player
- Miriam McDonald (born 1987), Canadian actress
- Neil McDonald (footballer) (born 1965), English footballer and coach
- Niels McDonald (born 2008), German tennis player
- Rod McDonald (footballer, born 1967), English footballer
- Rod McDonald (footballer, born 1992), English footballer
- Roxanne McDonald (born c. 1960), Australian actress
- Scott McDonald (born 1983), Australian footballer
- Shawn McDonald (born 1978), American Christian singer, songwriter and guitarist
- Simon McDonald (diplomat) (born 1961), British diplomat
- Will McDonald IV (born 1999), American football player

== Notable people: Mac-Donald surname ==
- Sherjill Mac-Donald (born 1984), Dutch footballer

== Pseudonyms ==
- Abby McDonald, pen-name of British author Abigal Hass
- Ian MacDonald (born Ian MacCormick, 1948–2003), British music critic and author

== Fictional characters ==
- Ronald "Mac" McDonald, character in It's Always Sunny in Philadelphia
- Ronald McDonald, international fast-food franchise clown mascot and spokesman
- Old MacDonald, title character of the traditional children's song Old MacDonald Had a Farm
- Several characters from the British soap opera Coronation Street, including:
  - Amy McDonald
  - Andy McDonald
  - Becky McDonald
  - Karen McDonald
  - Jim McDonald
  - Liz McDonald
  - Ruairi McDonald
  - Steve McDonald
  - Tracy McDonald
  - Vicky McDonald'

== See also ==
Ambiguous human name pages

- Ian McDonald (disambiguation)
- James MacDonald (disambiguation)
- James McDonald (disambiguation)
- John Macdonald (disambiguation)
- John McDonald (disambiguation)
- Kevin McDonald (disambiguation)
- Michael MacDonald (disambiguation)
- Steve McDonald (disambiguation)
