= James McDonald =

James McDonald may refer to:

== Politics ==
- James McDonald (Irish politician), nationalist politician in Northern Ireland
- Jim MacDonald (James McDonald) (1936/1937–2019) (Irish politician), Catholic Unionist
- James McDonald (Canadian politician) (1828–1912), Canadian lawyer, politician, and judge
- James McDonald (New Zealand politician) (1837–1900), New Zealand politician
- James McDonald (Victorian Nationalist politician) (1856–1933), Victorian state MP
- James McDonald (Victorian Labor politician) (1889–1938), Victorian state MP
- James S. McDonald (1839–?), Nova Scotia politician
- James Greer McDonald (1824–1909), surveyor and member of the Los Angeles Common Council
- James E. McDonald (politician) (1881–1952), Texas Agriculture Commissioner
- James Grover McDonald (1886–1964), US ambassador and chair of High Commissioner for Refugees Coming from Germany
- James McDonald (Tasmanian politician) (1877–1947), Australian Labor Party Member of the Tasmania House of Assembly
- James Albert McDonald (1870–1957), Canadian politician in the Legislative Assembly of British Columbia

== Sports ==
- James McDonald, 1890s footballer, see List of Bury F.C. players (1–24 appearances)
- James McDonald (baseball) (born 1984), American baseball pitcher
- James McDonald (Australian footballer) (born 1976), Australian rules footballer
- James McDonald (Scottish footballer), Scottish footballer
- James McDonald (American football) (born 1961), American football player
- James McDonald (jockey) (born 1992), New Zealand jockey
- James Allen McDonald (1915–1997), college and professional American football player
- James A. McDonald, American college football coach

== Other ==
- James Charles McDonald (1840–1912), Roman Catholic bishop, fourth Bishop of Charlottetown, 1891–1912
- James McDonald (economist) (born c. 1942), economist at Brigham Young University
- James McDonald (priest) (1824–1890), Irish priest and missionary to New Zealand
- James McDonald (RAF officer) (1899–?), World War I flying ace
- James McDonald (writer) (born 1953), British writer
- James McDonald (businessman) (1843–1915), English-American oil businessman
- James E. McDonald (1920–1971), American physicist, known for research regarding UFOs
- James Harper McDonald (1900–1973), American Navy diver and Medal of Honor recipient
- James McDonald (artist) (1865–1935), New Zealand artist and promoter of Maori arts and crafts
- James McDonald (lawyer) (died 1831), first Native American who professionally studied law
- James McDonald (attorney), (born 1982) American attorney
- F. James McDonald (1922–2010), American engineer and business executive
- Jim McDonald (electrical engineer) (Jim McDonald), Brittish University vice-chancellor and scholar

== See also ==
- Jimmy McDonald (disambiguation)
- Jim McDonald (disambiguation)
- James MacDonald (disambiguation)
- Jamie McDonald (disambiguation)
