= Jim McDonald =

Jim McDonald may refer to:

- Jim McDonald (halfback) (1915–1997), college and professional American football player
- Jim McDonald (American football coach) (1936–2012), American football coach
- Jim McDonald (footballer, born 1877) (1877–1968), Australian rules footballer for Essendon
- Jim McDonald (footballer, born 1887) (1887–1954), Australian rules footballer for Richmond
- Jim McDonald (footballer, born 1913) (1913-1984), Australian rules footballer for Melbourne
- Jim McDonald (pitcher) (1927–2004), Major League Baseball pitcher
- Jim McDonald (basketball), former college player and coach, see 1981–82 NCAA Division I men's basketball season
- Jim McDonald (third baseman) (1860–1914), Major League Baseball third baseman
- Jim McDonald (outfielder), Major League Baseball outfielder
- Jim McDonald (Coronation Street), character in Coronation Street played by actor Charles Lawson
- Jim McDonald (soccer) (born 1954), Canadian soccer player from the 1970s
- Jim McDonald (electrical engineer), Vice Chancellor, University of Strathclyde
- Jim McDonald (Northern Ireland), Northern Irish Catholic Unionist
- Jim McDonald (Australian politician) (born 1967), member of the Queensland Legislative Assembly
- Jimmy McDonald (footballer, born 1883) (1883–1924), Scottish footballer
- Jimmy McDonald (athlete) (born 1964), Irish Olympic racewalker
- Jimmy McDonald (footballer, born 1932), Scottish footballer

== See also ==
- James McDonald (disambiguation)
- Jimmy MacDonald (sound effects artist) (1906–1991), Scottish voice actor; the voice of Mickey Mouse from 1947 to 1977
