= Ali Jahangiri =

Finnish stand up comedian (born 1981)

Ali Jahangiri (Persian: علی جهانگیری; born 6 June 1981 in Tehran, Iran) is an Iranian-born Finnish stand up comedian and media presenter. He often makes jokes about the prejudice the Finns feel towards immigrants.

== Life and career ==
In spring 2012 and spring 2013 Jahangiri hosted the reality show Viidakon tähtöset on Sub. He also hosted the radio show Ali ja Husu on the station Yle Puhe from January 2013 to 2016 together with Abdirahim Hussein. In summertime from 2013 to 2016 Jahangiri had his own talk show Ali Show on Yle Puhe. The last episode of Ali ja Husu was heard on Yle Puhe on 2 June 2016. In autumn 2016 the slot was taken by a new program hosted by multi-cultural women, with Jahangiri as the producer.

Jahangiri graduated as master of managerial economics from the Aalto University in 2012. He started stand up comedy in 2004. Aside from being a stand up comedian and a presenter, Jahangiri has worked as a project manager at the consulting company Trainers' House. He also has a smoothie stand at the Jumbo shopping centre in Vantaa together with his father, where they use fruit from grocery stores that would otherwise go to waste.

Jahangiri came to Finland together with his family as refugees in 1991. His father had worked in Iran as an electrician and his mother as a nurse. Jahangiri also has a younger brother Efi, who is a physician and also does stand up comedy.

In spring 2017 Jahangiri competed on the tenth season of the Tanssii tähtien kanssa show. He ranked third together with his dance partner Saana Akiola.

On 1 October 2018 the first episode of the English-language podcast How Bad Was That with Ali & James was published, with Jahangiri and stand up comedian James Lórien MacDonald expressing humorous opinions about current matters.

In September 2021 Jahangiri announced he would start work as an entrepreneur at his own Kesko grocery store.

== Filmography ==
- Jingle Bells (2022)
