= Jamie McDonald =

Jamie McDonald or MacDonald may refer to:

- Jamie McDonald (adventurer) (born 1986), first British man to run the breadth of Canada
- Jamie McDonald (rugby league) (born 1977), Australian rugby league player
- Jamie MacDonald (bowls), lawn bowler from Jersey
- Jamie MacDonald (Finnish comedian), Canadian-born Finnish comedian
- Jamie MacDonald (footballer) (born 1986), Scottish football goalkeeper
- Jamie MacDonald, a fictional character in the BBC TV series Monarch of the Glen
- Jamie MacDonald (The Thick of It), a fictional character in the BBC TV series The Thick of It
- Jamie MacDonald (singer), a contemporary Christian singer active from 2014 to present
- Jamie Macdonald (speed skater) (born 1994), Canadian short track speed skater
- Jamie MacDonald (Scottish comedian)
- Jamie Macdonald (album), a 2026 studio album

== See also ==
- James MacDonald (disambiguation)
