= James Macdonnell =

James (or Jim) Macdonnell, Macdonell, or McDonnell may refer to:

- James MacDonnell (physician) (1763–1845), Irish physician
- James Macdonell (British Army officer) (1781–1857), Scottish officer of the British Army
- James Macdonell (journalist) (1841–1879), Scottish journalist
- James MacDonnell (cricketer) (1841–1891), Irish cricketer
- James Macdonnell (Canadian politician) (1884–1973), Canadian lawyer and parliamentarian
- James Smith McDonnell (1899–1980), aviation pioneer and founder of McDonnell Aircraft Corporation, later McDonnell Douglas
- Jim McDonnell (baseball) (1922–1993), Major League Baseball catcher
- James MacDonnell (Newfoundland politician) (1890–1924), member of the Newfoundland House of Assembly
- Jim McDonnell (born 1948), Australian artist, member of Optronic Kinetics art collective in Sydney in the 1970s
- Jim McDonell (born 1954), Canadian MPP
- Jim McDonnell (boxer) (born 1960), British boxer
- Jim McDonnell (sheriff) (born 1959), sheriff of Los Angeles County, California
- James McDonnell (rugby league) (born 2000), rugby league footballer for the Wigan Warriors

== See also ==
- James MacDonald (disambiguation)
