= Linda MacDonald (activist) =

Canadian activist

Linda MacDonald is a Canadian activist against non-state torture, a human rights violation and crime.

== Career ==
Born in Charlottetown, MacDonald is a retired nurse living in Nova Scotia, Canada and the co-Founder of Persons Against Non-State Torture—a self-funded human rights advocacy campaign. MacDonald worked in hospitals, public health, and as care coordinator with home care. She is an networker, educator, researcher, author and a member of the NGO Alliance on Crime Prevention and Criminal Justice, Nation Council of Women Canada and ACUNS.

She received her RN at the Victoria General hospital, Bachelor of Nursing degree at Dalhousie University and Masters of Education degree at St. Mary's University all in Halifax, Nova Scotia, Canada.

MacDonald was featured on feminist Robin Morgan's radio show WMC Live. She works with Jeanne Sarson as a human right activist for girls and women who have endured NST.
