= James MacDonald =

James MacDonald or Macdonald may refer to:

== People ==
=== Arts and entertainment ===
- J. E. H. MacDonald (1873–1932), Canadian painter, member of the Group of Seven
- James Stuart MacDonald (1878–1952), art critic and Director of the Art Gallery of NSW
- Jimmy MacDonald (sound effects artist) (1906–1991), voice of Mickey Mouse
- James D. Macdonald (born 1954), American author and critic
- James MacDonald (actor), Canadian actor
- James Macdonald (director) (born 1958), British theater and film director
- James Wilson Alexander MacDonald, American sculptor
- Jock Macdonald (James Williamson Galloway Macdonald, 1897–1960), Canadian artist

=== Politics ===
- Sir James Macdonald, 2nd Baronet (1784–1832), British member of parliament for Tain Burghs, Newcastle-under-Lyme, Sutherland, Calne, and Hampshire
- James William MacDonald (1811–1881), politician in colonial South Australia and Colonial Treasurer
- James E. MacDonald (1842–1903), politician in Prince Edward Island, Canada
- James MacDonald (trade unionist) (1857–1938), secretary of the London Trades Council
- James Alexander MacDonald (1858–1919), lawyer, judge and leader of the British Columbia Liberal Party
- James Ramsay MacDonald (1866–1937), British prime minister
- Jim MacDonald (politician) (1917–1989), Australian politician
- James David Macdonald (politician) (1922–1995), City of Calgary alderman and author of Grand Cayman's tax haven law
- James H. MacDonald (1832–1889), lieutenant governor of Michigan
- James MacDonald (Canadian politician) (1849–1916), merchant and political figure in Nova Scotia
- James S. MacDonald (1839– after 1882), political figure in Nova Scotia

=== Sports ===
- James MacDonald (cricketer) (1906–1969), Irish cricketer
- James Macdonald (footballer), Scottish footballer
- Kilby MacDonald (James Allan Macdonald, 1913–1986), Canadian ice hockey player
- Jamie MacDonald (footballer) (born 1986), Scottish football goalkeeper
- Jimmy MacDonald (rugby union), Scotland international rugby union player

=== Other ===
- James MacDonald, 6th of Dunnyveg (died 1565), Scoto-Irish chieftain
- Sir James MacDonald, 9th of Dunnyveg (died 1626), last chief of Clan MacDonald of Dunnyveg or Clan Donald South
- James Macdonald (British Army officer) (1862–1927), Scottish engineer, explorer and cartographer
- James A. Macdonald (1862–1923), newspaper editor, educator, minister and author in Ontario, Canada
- James Alexander MacDonald (botanist) (1908–1997), Scottish botanist and plant pathologist
- James Macdonald (ornithologist) (1908–2002), British and Australian ornithologist and ornithological writer
- James Hector MacDonald (1925–2025), Canadian Roman Catholic archbishop
- James Ross MacDonald (1923–2024), American physicist
- James MacDonald (pastor) (born 1960), disqualified pastor of Harvest Bible Chapel, Walk in the Word and Harvest Bible Fellowship
- Sir James Mor Macdonald, 2nd Baronet (c. 1605–1678), Scottish nobleman and soldier
- Sir James Macdonald, 6th Baronet (died 1723), Scottish chief of Clan Macdonald of Sleat
- James MacDonald (police officer) (1968–1993), murdered American police officer
- James Macdonald (civil servant) (1898–1963), British civil servant and forester
- James Scott Macdonald (1896–1985), Canadian career diplomat

== Fictional characters ==
- James MacDonald (Arthur character), a minor character in the TV series Arthur
- Jimmy MacDonald, main character of the television mockumentary series Jimmy MacDonald's Canada

== See also ==
- Jamie McDonald (disambiguation), including Jamie MacDonald
- James McDonald (disambiguation)
- James Macdonnell (disambiguation)
