= Anna McNuff =

British rower

- Born: October 18, 1984 (age 40)
- Occupation(s): Endurance athlete, adventurer, author and motivational speaker

Anna McNuff (born 18 October 1984) is a British endurance athlete and author known for her long, human powered adventures – most notably running the distance of 90 marathons through Great Britain in her bare feet.

== Biography ==
The daughter of two Olympians, McNuff grew up in a family where the pursuit of physical and mental excellence was encouraged. From age 6 she played football in a boys league and later went on to play for Wimbledon Ladies FC. At aged 16 she took up rowing and went on to represent Great Britain. During her time in the Great Britain Squad, McNuff became a World Champion at the University Games in 2006, and won a bronze medal at the 2007 European Championships. Due to injury she retired from rowing.

In 2017 McNuff co-founded ‘Adventure Queens’, a not-for-profit women's adventure project to equip women with practical information, advice and tips about wild camping. Shortly after in 2017, she became the UK Ambassador for Girlguiding.

== Education ==
Anna attended The Tiffin Girls School, before studying Psychology at Royal Holloway, University of London.

== Adventures ==
McNuff has completed a multitude of challenges, the smaller of which include running the length of Hadrian's Wall (86 miles) dressed as a Roman soldier, running the length of the Jurassic Coast (96 miles) dressed as a Dinosaur and rollerblading 100 miles around Amsterdam.

In 2013 McNuff completed a 7-month, 11,000 mile cycle through North America. She travelled through every state of America, solo and unsupported.

In 2015 McNuff became the first person (male or female) to run the 1,911 mile long Te Araroa, without a support crew. Running up to 32 miles a day and sleeping wild most nights, McNuff completed this challenge in 148 days, carrying everything she required with her in a 14 kg backpack.

In 2016 McNuff cycled 5,500 miles through Bolivia, Chile and Argentina in 184 days as part of a two-woman team. They ascended over 100,000 metres on their journey, which is equivalent to 11 times the height of Everest.

=== Barefoot Britain ===
In 2019 McNuff set out to run 2,620 miles (100 marathons) through Britain in her bare feet. Starting in the Shetland Islands and ending five months later in London, she gave talks to the young women of Britain in the towns and cities she visited. She also encouraged the general public to run with her (in trainers) and was joined by over 2,500 runners during the course of the adventure. The challenge received widespread media attention and included a feature on the cover of the UK's Women's Running Magazine and an interview on BBC Breakfast with Louise Minchin and Dan Walker.

== Publishing ==
McNuff's debut book about running the length of New Zealand called ‘The Pants of Perspective’ was published in July 2017. She has since gone on to write a book about her journey by bike through America called ’50 Shades of the USA’ (published Sept 2017). Her third book about South America, ‘Llama Drama’ was published in July 2020. Bedtime Adventure Stories for Grown Ups (Anna's Adventures) was published in May 2021. 'Barefoot Britain: A Running Adventure Like No Other' was published in December 2022.

McNuff's first children's book called ‘100 Adventures to Have Before You Grow Up’ was published by Walker Books UK and released on April 2, 2020.

McNuff has contributed pieces to a number of other books including: Waymaking: An Anthology of Women's Adventure Writing, Poetry and Art (Vertebrate publishing, 2018), The Kindness of Strangers: Stories to make your heart grow (Summersdale, 2017), Lonely Planet Atlas of Adventure (Lonely Planet, 2017), Adventure Cycle touring Handbook (Trailblazer, 2015).

McNuff has written for a number of magazines and newspapers, most notably The Telegraph Travel section.

== TV and documentary ==
McNuff appeared on series 8 of CBBC's Operation Ouch - sharing her ‘brilliant body’ with Dr Ronx on an episode about barefoot running. Her Barefoot Britain run was also documented via a series of popular YouTube videos in 2019.

== Personal life ==
McNuff lives in Gloucester with her partner Jamie McDonald, aka Adventureman.

== Honours ==
- UK Ambassador for Girlguiding: 2017 to present
