= Steve McDonald =

Steve or Stephen McDonald may refer to:

- Steve McDonald (Celtic music) (born 1950), Celtic music artist
- Steve McDonald (Coronation Street), a fictional character on the soap opera Coronation Street
- Steve McDonald (cricketer) (born 1974), English cricketer
- Steve Macdonald (filk musician) (born 1961), American filk musician
- Steve MacDonald (soccer) (born 1970), Canadian soccer player
- Steve MacDonald (strongman) (born 1969), professional strongman competitor
- Stephen McDonald (footballer) (1884–1964), Scottish footballer
- Stephen W. McDonald, astronomer

== See also ==
- Steve MacDonald (1971–2002), Canadian drummer with Gorguts
- Stephen A. MacDonald (born 1946), American software executive
- Stephen MacDonald (1933–2009), English actor
- Steven Edward McDonald (born 1956), American writer
- Steven Shane McDonald (born 1967), bass player
- Steven McDonald (1957–2017), New York City Police Department detective
