= Jamie McDonald (adventurer) =

British adventurer (born 1986)

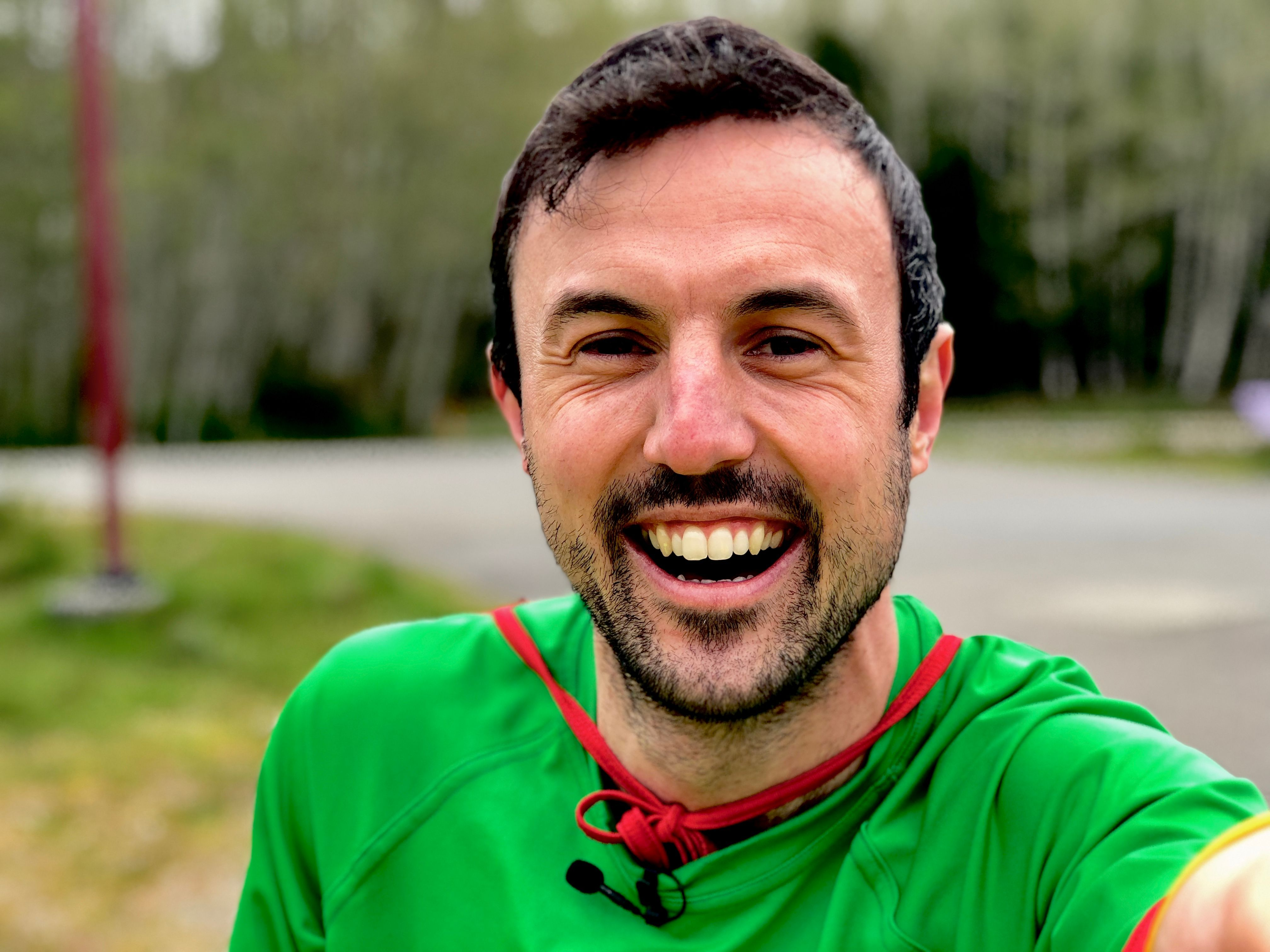
- Born: 19 August 1986 (age 40); Gloucester, England
- Education: Honorary Fellow at University of Gloucestershire
- Occupation: Motivational Speaker
- Known for: Adventuring as his alter-ego, Adventureman
- Awards: Pride of Britain
- Website: www.adventureman.org

Jamie McDonald (born 19 August 1986) is a British adventurer, author, motivational speaker living in Gloucester. He is best known for completing worldly adventures dressed up as his alter-ego, Adventureman.

== Career ==
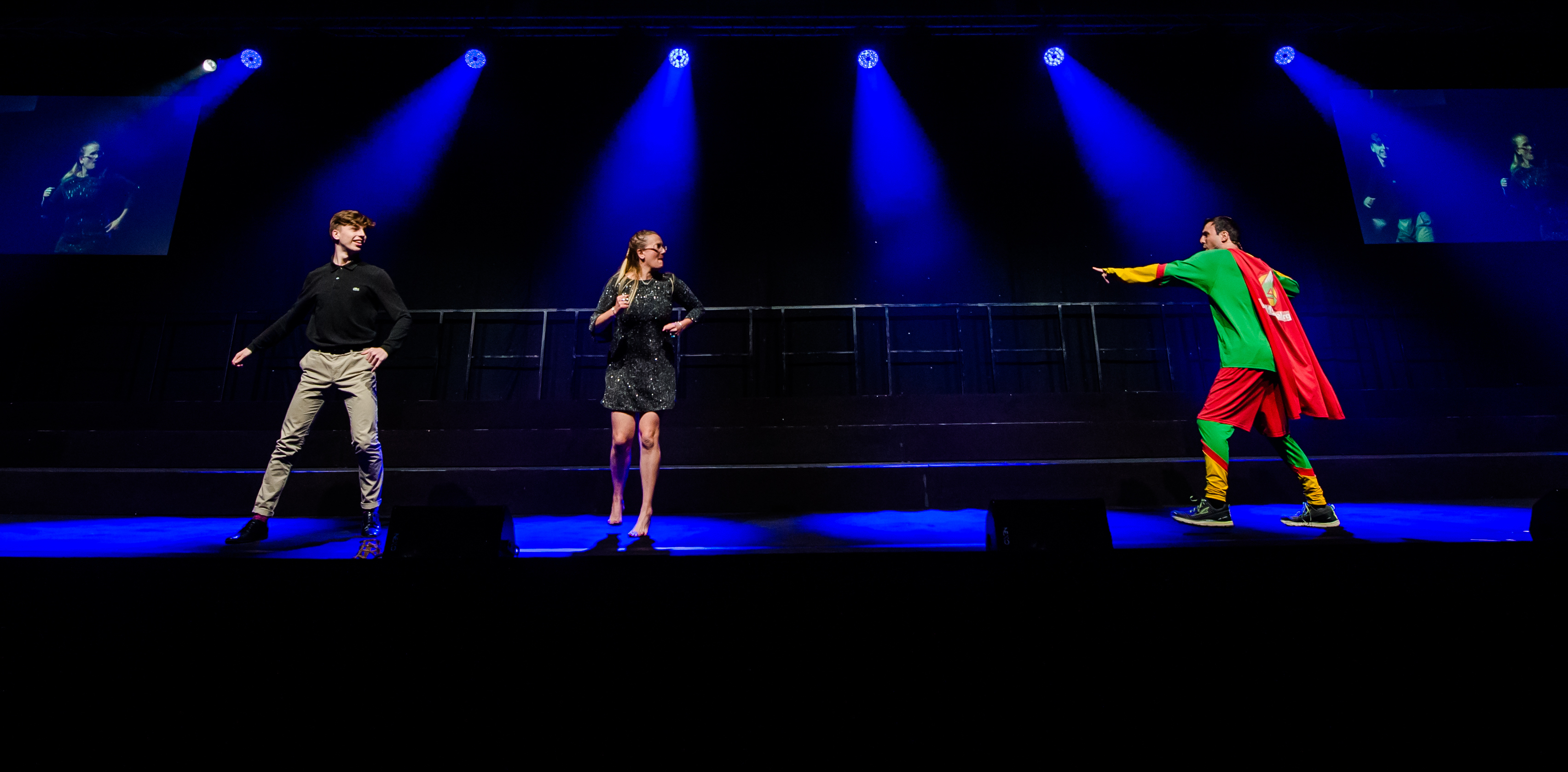
McDonald (right) as Adventureman

McDonald has delivered motivational speeches for numerous events globally. He has spoken at various corporations, including Microsoft and Google, and received acclaim from Steve Redgrave, Geoff Hurst, Kelly Holmes, Ranulph Fiennes, and Prince Harry.

=== Author ===
In 2017, McDonald released a book titled Adventureman: Anyone Can Be a Superhero, about his historic 5,000-mile run across Canada. The release became a best-seller on Amazon.

=== Adventureman suit ===
Whilst McDonald does his adventures, he dresses up in his alter-ego's costume, Adventureman. The costume was designed by 10-year-old Conner Reddy who has dyspraxia.

=== Cycling Bangkok to Gloucester ===
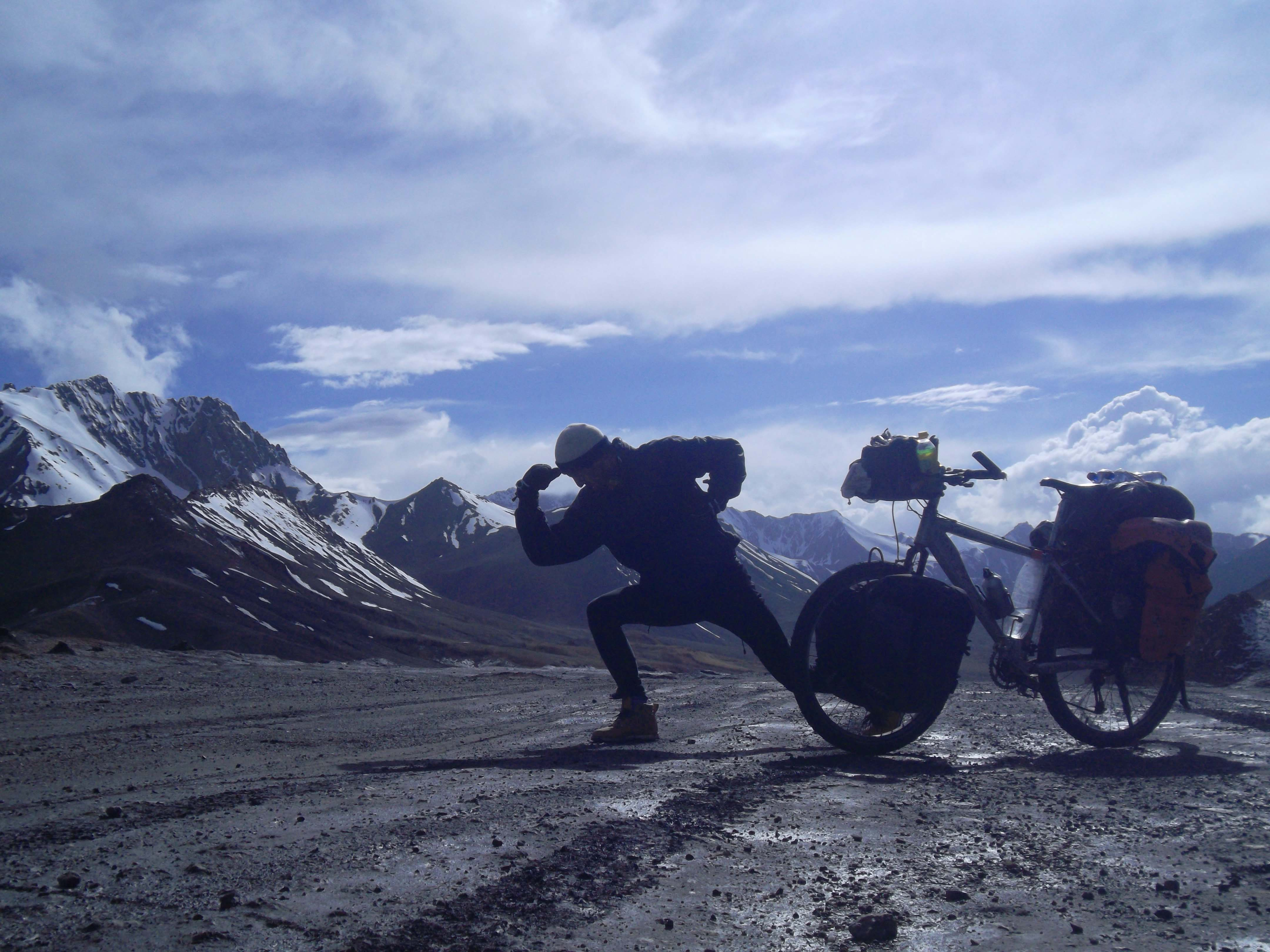
Cycling Bangkok to Gloucester, Jamie McDonald

In 2012, McDonald bought a second hand bike and decided to cycle 14,000 miles from Bangkok to his hometown Gloucester, passing through numerous countries. On his route, he was shot at, arrested, and had difficulties sleeping. He documented his journey in a series of YouTube clips.

=== Static cycle world record ===
Two days after completing his journey from Bangkok to Gloucester, McDonald attempted the world static cycling record, at 224 hours and 24 minutes. It was a challenge he had conceived whilst cycling from Bangkok. He beat the record, pedalling for 268 hours.

=== Solo run across Canada ===
McDonald set off on 9 March 2013 from St John's, Newfoundland and Labrador, on the Atlantic coast and completed the journey of 5,000 miles to Vancouver on the Pacific on 3 February 2014. McDonald spoke to schools and businesses throughout the journey for fundraising assistance. His original intention was to complete the journey before winter.

McDonald was inspired by Terry Fox, a paraplegic athlete whose run across Canada was cut short by cancer.

On the route, McDonald faced a number of ordeals: he endured −40 °C temperatures, he was beaten and robbed celebrating the new year in Banff, Alberta, and had to push his 60 kilograms (130 lb) load in a wheelchair when he was unable to carry it on his back. McDonald Suffering from acute tendinitis in his foot, he continued his run and a bone spur has grown over the inflammation. He slept rough on the side of the road unless taken in by strangers.

He raised more than $500,000 (£250,000) for children's charities in the United Kingdom and Canada in a bid to give back to the charities that supported him as an unwell child.

=== Solo run across America ===
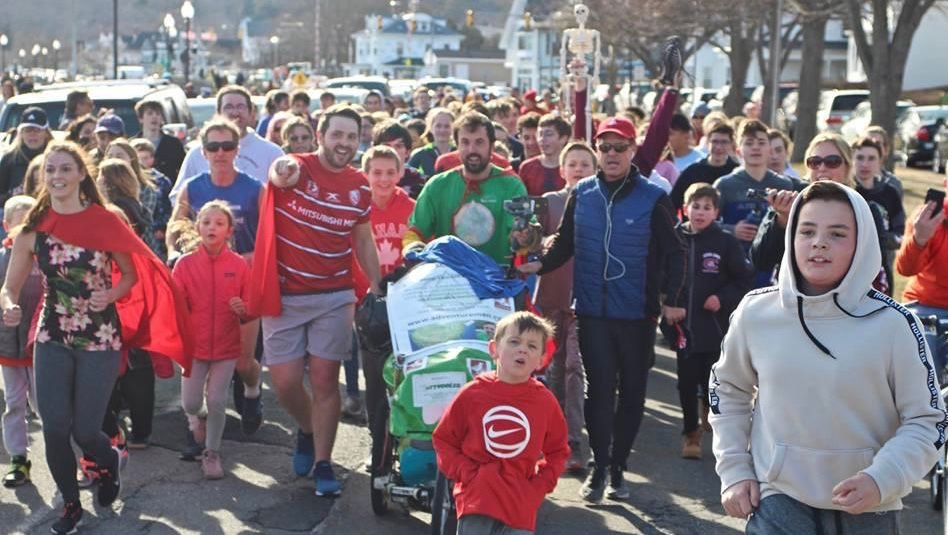
Run across America finish

McDonald started his run on 10 April 2018 on the West Coast at Cape Alava, in Washington's Clallam County, and completed his 5,500-mile (or 210 marathon) run a year later on the East Coast in Gloucester, Massachusetts.

McDonald raised money for children's hospitals in the United States and ill children in the United Kingdom, raising nearly $200,000 (£175,000).

=== Treadmill world record ===
Weeks later, McDonald broke another endurance world record, running the most miles humanly possible to this point in time; 524 miles. McDonald spent 7 days on a treadmill.

McDonald spent over 20 hours a day running, spanning 3 marathons a day; a total of 20 consecutive marathons.

=== Superhero Foundation ===
McDonald's charity, Superhero Foundation, was founded to fundraise for a man in Gloucestershire who required assistance paying for his daughter's motorized wheelchair. The foundation has helped other families in similar situations.

== Personal life ==
McDonald was born in Gloucester, England to Donald and Ann McDonald. As a child, McDonald battled immune deficiency, epilepsy, and syringomyelia and was frequently hospitalised until the age of nine. McDonald lives in Gloucester with his partner Anna McNuff, who also is an adventurer, author, and motivational speaker.

== Honours and awards ==
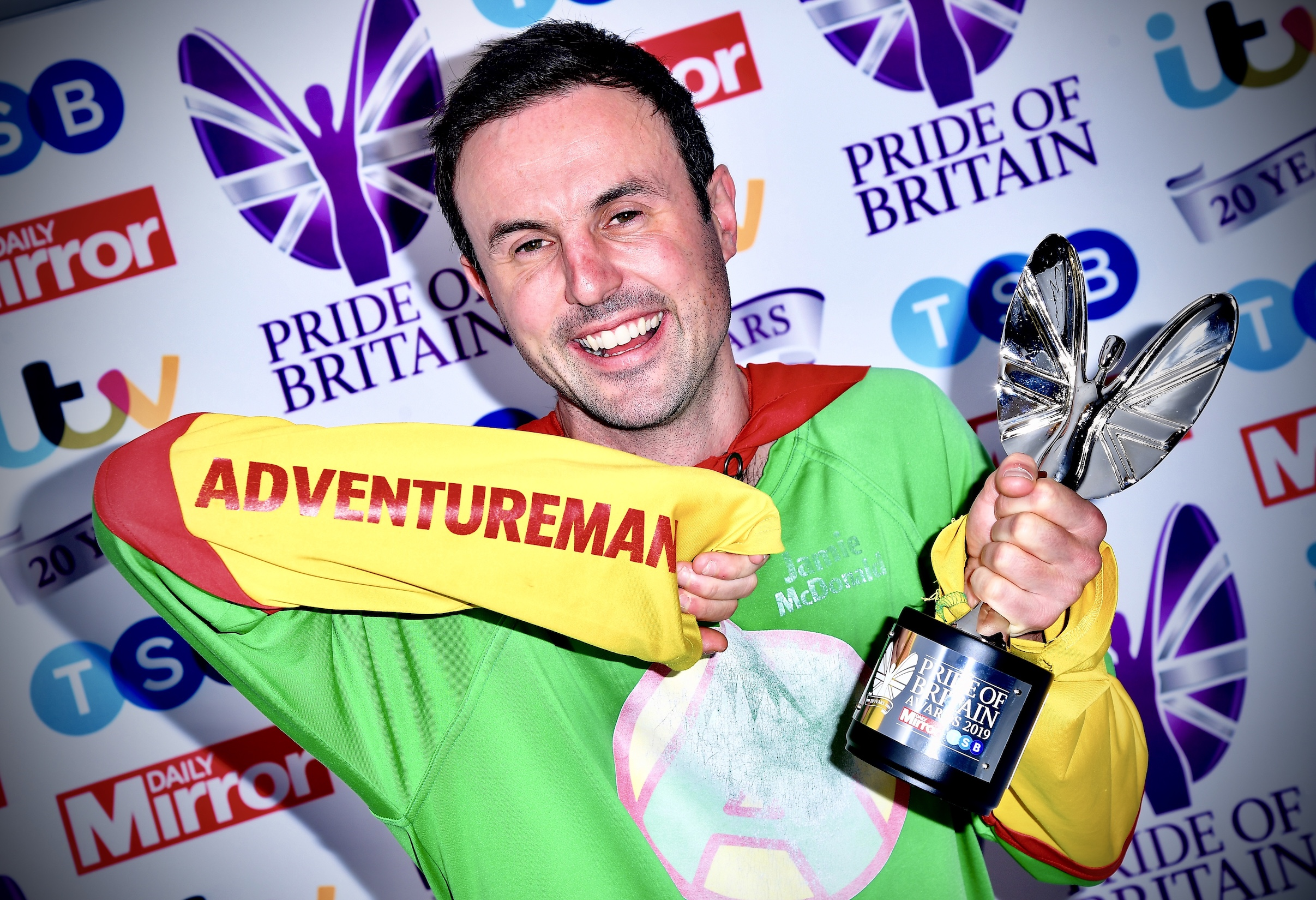
Pride of Britain Winner, Jamie McDonald

In December 2012, McDonald achieved a World Record for 'Marathon Static Cycling' - stepping off the bike at 268 hours (more than 12 days).

In 2013, during his run across Canada, in Calgary, he was Awarded the White Hat (in previous years the likes of Prince William, Kate Middleton, Arnold Schwarzenegger and many more have also been White Hatted).

Voted 'Male Runner Of The Year' and awarded the 'Golden Shoe' from Canadian Running magazine.

After the run across Canada, on his homecoming in Gloucester, McDonald was presented with the Medal of the City of Gloucester.

In September 2014, McDonald was named Pride of Britain's 'Fundraiser of the Year' for the West.

He was named in the Independent's 'Happy List 2014', a list of 100 people giving back to the community.

Ambassador of the Year at the Believe in Gloucester Awards 2014.

National Adventure Award Winner for 'Fundraiser of the Year' in 2014.

Honorary Fellowship from the University of Gloucestershire in 2015.

Pride of Britain winner for 'Fundraiser of the Year' - 2019.
