= Stephen A. MacDonald =

American software executive

Stephen A. MacDonald (b. c. 1946) is an American software executive. He is best known for his role as the first Adobe Systems Vice President of Sales and Marketing.

== Biography ==
=== Early life and education ===
MacDonald grew up in Nova Scotia, Canada, and received a Bachelor of Science degree from Dalhousie University.

=== Career ===
He began his high technology career with Hewlett Packard, where he spent eleven years in international sales and marketing management. MacDonald joined Adobe in 1983, shortly after the company was formed. He went on to become Adobe's General Manager and COO before leaving in 1996 as the company topped $1B in sales.

After leaving Adobe, MacDonald became CEO of Active Software, a startup that helped define the enterprise application integration category. webMethods purchased Active Software in 2000 for $1.3B. Steve also served as an outside board member for two public companies: Verity Inc. and NCD Computing.

Most recently MacDonald co-founded FineEye Color Solutions, where he currently serves as the company's president and CEO. FineEye is a software company that promises to do for color management what PostScript did for publishing.
