= James McDonald (Scottish footballer) =

Scottish footballer

Personal information
- Full name: James B. McDonald
- Place of birth: Edinburgh, Scotland
- Positions: Right half; forward

Senior career*
Years	Team	Apps	(Gls)
1919–1920	London Caledonians		
1920–1921	Civil Service Strollers		
1921–1922	King's Park	11	(2)
1922–1930	Queen's Park	223	(31)
1930–1931	Heart of Midlothian	0	(0)

International career
1926–1931	Scotland Amateurs	4	(0)
- * Club domestic league appearances and goals

James B. McDonald was a Scottish amateur footballer who made over 220 appearances in the Scottish League for Queen's Park as a right half. He represented Scotland at amateur level.
