= James Macdonald (footballer) =

Scottish footballer

Personal information
- Full name: James Macdonald
- Place of birth: Scotland
- Position: Inside right

Senior career*
Years	Team	Apps	(Gls)
1916–1917	Heart of Midlothian	3	(1)
- * Club domestic league appearances and goals

James Macdonald was a Scottish professional footballer who played in the Scottish League for Heart of Midlothian as an inside right.

== Personal life ==
Macdonald served as a lance corporal in the Royal Scots during the First World War.

== Career statistics ==
Appearances and goals by club, season and competition
Club	Season	League			National Cup		Total	
Club	Season	Division	Apps	Goals	Apps	Goals	Apps	Goals
Heart of Midlothian	1916–17	Scottish First Division	3	1	—		3	1
Career total			3	1	—		3	1
