= James MacDonnell (cricketer) =

Irish cricketer (1841–1891)

Personal information
- Full name: James Edward MacDonnell
- Born: 23 April 1841; Ireland
- Died: 26 November 1891 (aged 50); Brighton, Sussex, England

Domestic team information
- Years: Team
- 1881: Gloucestershire

Career statistics
Competition	First-class
Matches	1
Runs scored	0
Batting average	0.00
100s/50s	0/0
Top score	0
Catches/stumpings	0/–
- Source: Cricinfo, 2 January 2022

James MacDonnell (23 April 1841 — 26 November 1891) was an Irish cricketer who played for Gloucestershire. He was born in Ireland and died in Brighton.
