= Jim McDonald (footballer, born 1887) =

Australian rules footballer

Personal information
- Full name: James Alexander McDonald
- Born: 19 June 1887; Clifton Hill, Victoria
- Died: 4 September 1954 (aged 67); Collingwood, Victoria

Playing career^{1}
Years	Club	Games (Goals)
1915	Richmond	10 (12)
- ^{1} Playing statistics correct to the end of 1915.

James Alexander McDonald (19 June 1887 – 4 September 1954) was an Australian rules footballer who played with Richmond in the Victorian Football League (VFL).
