= Abdirahim Hussein =

Somali-Finnish personality and politician (born 1978)

Abdirahim Hussein Mohamed عبد الرحيم حسين محمد
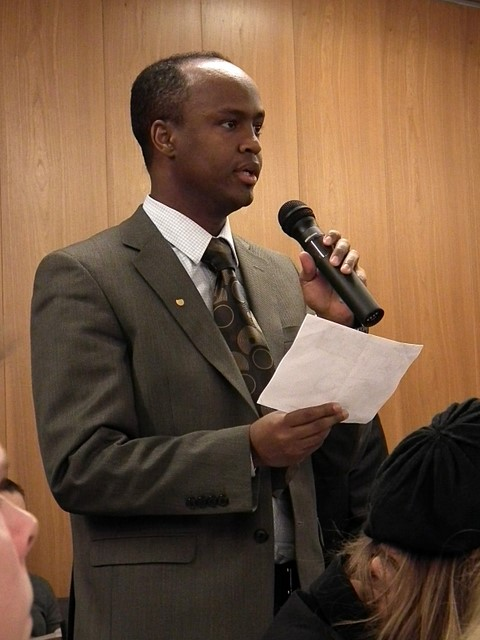
- Born: October 21, 1978 (age 48); Somalia
- Occupation: politician
- Title: Chairman of Moniheli

Abdirahim ''Husu'' Hussein Mohamed (Somali: Cabdiraxiim Xuseen Maxamed, Arabic: عبد الرحيم حسين محمد) (born 21 October 1978 in Somalia) is a Somalian-born Finnish media personality and a politician.

== Biography ==
In 2007, Mohamed became the first immigrant to chair a political party organization in Finland when he was elected Chairman of the Helsinki Centre Youth. In June 2016, Mohamed left the Center Party, because of the budget cuts in education and development aid made by the Sipilä Cabinet. He subsequently joined the Social Democratic Party.

In 2015 he criticized Israel, claiming that Israel is systematically murdering Palestinian women, children, and the elderly.

In 2017 municipal elections, Mohamed was elected to the City Council of Helsinki.

In 2019 Mohamed apologized for making up a story about removing a passenger from his taxi after allegedly suffering racist abuse, stating, "I apologize for my actions and for lying. As a decision-maker, it is my duty to be honest. I depend on my voters’ trust and I have now broken that trust. I shall do everything I can to restore trust in my actions."

Mohamed is the Chairman of Moniheli, a co-operation network for multicultural organizations in the Helsinki capital region. He also has his own radio show on Finnish National Radio Yle.
