= Murder of Jayne MacDonald =

British murder victim

Jayne MacDonald
- MacDonald, c. 1977
- Born: Jayne Michelle MacDonald; 16 August 1960; Leeds, West Yorkshire, England
- Died: 26 June 1977 (aged 16); Chapeltown, Leeds, England
- Cause of death: Hammer blows (x3) to skull. Multiple stab wounds to upper chest and back
- Body discovered: 9:25 a.m. 26 June 1977, Chapeltown Road, Leeds53.81773°N 1.53314°W (approximate)
- Resting place: Harehills Cemetery, Leeds, England; 53.80714°N 1.50147°W (approximate)
- Occupation: Shop assistant
- Known for: Victim of serial murder
- Height: 5 ft 3 in (1.60 m)

The murder of Jayne MacDonald is a British child murder case dating from June 1977 in which a 16-year-old girl was murdered by a combination of bludgeoning and stabbing in Chapeltown, Leeds, while walking home from an evening socialising with friends. Her murder was rapidly attributed to a series of murders committed by a serial killer known as the Yorkshire Ripper.

Although investigators believed MacDonald's murderer had attacked and/or murdered a minimum of seven women in the two years prior to her death, contemporary misogynistic and sexist attitudes among police officers and society in general had led police and the media to categorise the Ripper's victims as prostitutes and "good-time girls". As such, investigators believed the perpetrator solely preyed on women of specific sexual ethics and the crimes—although the subject of heightened, ongoing investigation—had only received moderate nationwide coverage.

MacDonald's murder caused considerable public alarm and forced the Chief Constable of West Yorkshire Police, Ronald Gregory, to appoint his most senior investigator in command of the investigation to apprehend the perpetrator.

== Early life ==
Jayne Michelle MacDonald was born in Leeds on 16 August 1960. She was the first of three children born to Wilfred and Irene (née Sutcliffe) MacDonald, with a sister, Debra, born in 1961 and a brother, Ian, born in 1964. MacDonald had two older half-sisters—twins Carole and Janet—from her mother's first marriage. (Note: Carole married Victor Skorpen when MacDonald was four years old. The two later relocated to Johannesburg, South Africa.) Her father worked for British Rail and her mother was a housekeeper. The family was close-knit, and resided in a modest terraced house in Scott Hall Avenue in the Chapeltown district of Leeds.

MacDonald grew into a pleasant and popular girl who enjoyed dancing and who occasionally earned money in her mid-teens by babysitting or performing chores. (Note: MacDonald's family lived on the same street as the Yorkshire Ripper's earliest murder victim, Wilma McCann. Prior to leaving school, MacDonald had occasionally earned money by babysitting for McCann's four children.) Her primary hobbies included dancing, roller skating and music; she had been an avid Bay City Rollers fan and, although "Rollermania" had largely subsided in the U.K. by 1977, she still remained a fan and had numerous posters of the band adorning her bedroom walls. In addition, although slender, petite, and attractive, by her sixteenth birthday, she had only had one boyfriend and had terminated the relationship before it had become physical.

=== Employment ===
In April 1977, MacDonald finished her schooling at Allerton High School. Shortly thereafter, she obtained full-time employment as a sales assistant at Grandways supermarket in nearby Roundhay Road, where she quickly became a popular member of staff among her colleagues. She began paying her parents a weekly percentage of her earnings, although much of the remainder of her wages were spent on clothes. Much of MacDonald's social activity occurred on Saturday evenings, when she typically either went roller skating or to a disco at the Merrion Centre with friends.

=== June 1977 ===
On Father's Day 1977, MacDonald and her younger siblings purchased several gifts for their father, including a silver cup inscribed 'World's Best Dad', which he placed on the mantlepiece above the living room fireplace. The following week, MacDonald learned her colleagues planned to meet and socialize in Leeds city centre that Saturday evening. As she had not previously socialized with her colleagues outside of working hours, she opted to join them.

As prearranged, on the evening of 25 June 1977, MacDonald met both friends and work colleagues at the Hofbrauhaus, a German-style bierkeller in Leeds. She was wearing a blue flared gingham skirt, a blue-and-white halter-neck sun top, a waist-length summer jacket, and platform-soled shoes. Her father would later recollect Jayne had kissed him "cheerio" as she left the family household and that his daughter had been "almost bursting with optimism and the sheer joy of life."

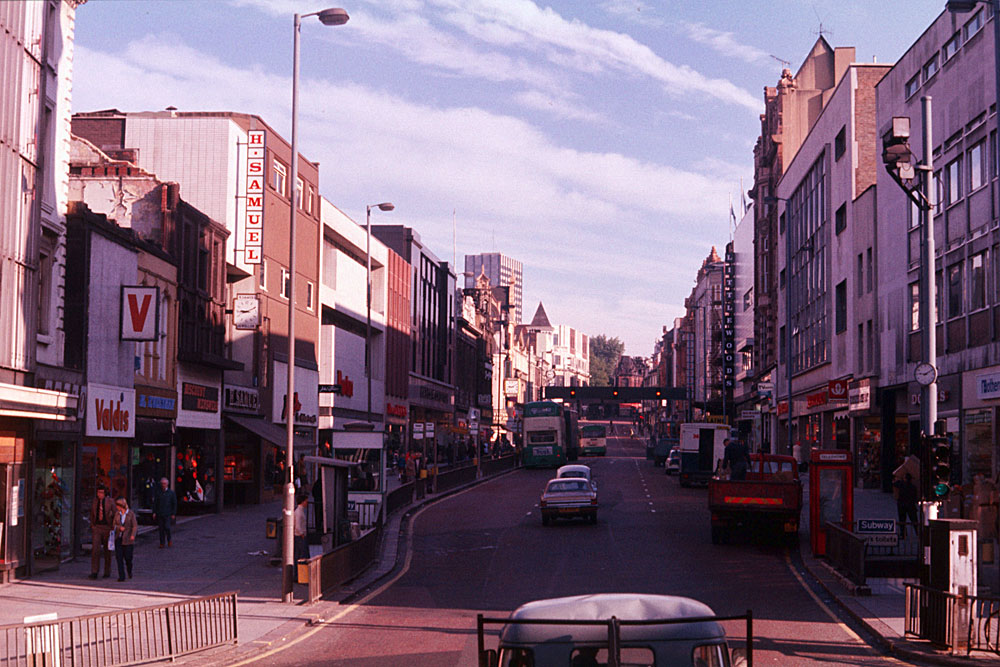
Briggate, seen here in 1978. MacDonald and Jones visited this location in the hours before her murder.

== Murder ==
According to colleagues, MacDonald spent much of her time at the Hofbrauhaus talking with acquaintances, listening to music, and dancing. At approximately 10:30 p.m., MacDonald and a friend, 18-year-old Mark Jones, walked from the premises in the direction of Briggate, where she suggested the two purchase some chips. By the time the pair had found a fish and chip shop and had eaten, MacDonald had missed her last bus home. Jones then walked with MacDonald towards his home, located close to St James's University Hospital, upon the promise that if his sister was at home, she would "give [MacDonald] a lift" home.

Jones' sister's car was not parked outside his house; therefore, the two continued walking along Beckett Road in the direction of Chapeltown, where the two parted company in a school field close to the gates of the hospital, having arranged to meet the following week. Jones would later estimate the time the two had parted was sometime after 1:30 a.m.

MacDonald first walked along Chapeltown Road, where she passed the Hayfield pub before turning left into Reginald Street. She was attacked by the Yorkshire Ripper at approximately 2 a.m. as she walked past an adventure playground; her murderer struck her once upon the rear of her skull, then dragged her body twenty yards into the darkness of the playground, (Note: In his 1981 confession to MacDonald's murder, Sutcliffe remarked her shoes had made a "horrible scraping noise" as he dragged her body into the playground.) where he bludgeoned her further about the head before stabbing her once in the back and repeatedly throughout the chest. Her murderer then purposely pulled her skirt upwards to expose her upper thighs before fleeing the scene.

I left her lying in the corner. I cannot remember whether she was lying face up or face down. I walked back down the same street to where I had parked my car ... I don't think I had any blood on me following this one. I cannot remember what I did with the knife, I must have taken it home with me and washed it. I feel I may have left it in the Corsair when I scrapped it ... When I saw in the papers that MacDonald was so young and not a prostitute, I felt like someone inhuman and I realised that it was a devil driving me against my will and that I was a beast.

— Section of Sutcliffe's confession to the murder of Jayne MacDonald. January 1981.

At 9:25 the following morning, two children entered the playground between Reginald Street and Reginald Terrace. Minutes later, they discovered MacDonald's body lying face down close to a rubbish-strewn wall on the far side of the playground. Her body was tentatively identified by the contents of her handbag, and formally identified by a relative later that day.

=== Autopsy ===
MacDonald's post mortem examination was conducted by Home Office pathologist Professor David Gee. Her autopsy revealed she had received three incapacitating bludgeoning wounds to the back of her head with a hammer before her upper torso had been purposely exposed by her murderer prior to his inflicting several stab wounds to her upper torso and back, with her frontal chest wounds being repeatedly stabbed through the same incision, causing the external diameter of one of the wounds to become enlarged. MacDonald did not die until several of the stab wounds to her torso had been inflicted. A broken glass bottle with screw-top attached was also deeply embedded in her stomach. (Note: Sutcliffe would later insist he had not thrust this bottle into MacDonald's torso and surmised the item must have embedded itself into her body as he dragged her from Reginald Street into the adventure playground.) Death had occurred between midnight and 3 a.m.

The physical evidence at the crime scene and upon MacDonald's body enabled investigators to determine the events surrounding MacDonald's murder. Spots of blood on the pavement outside the entrance to the playground indicated she had been struck upon the head as she walked along Reginald Street, causing her to slump to the ground before her murderer dragged her body some twenty yards into the darkness of the playground, where he had struck her further about the head at the location where her body lay, then pulled up her halter-neck sun top before inflicting the stab wounds to her torso, then turning her body face down and stabbing her in the back and beneath her right shoulder blade.

== Link to Yorkshire Ripper ==
The injuries to MacDonald's head and body, plus the location of the attack, rapidly linked her murder to a series committed by an individual known to police and the press as the Yorkshire Ripper, who had attacked a minimum of seven women in West Yorkshire over the previous two years—four fatally. However, due to contemporary societal attitudes, many of the previous victims murdered were believed by investigators to have been targeted by the perpetrator due to their perceived lifestyles. Several contemporary public statements by senior investigators involved in the manhunt to apprehend the Ripper following MacDonald's murder indicated their belief that, as Chapeltown was the red-light district of Leeds, the Ripper had mistakenly believe MacDonald had been a prostitute. (Note: Contemporary media accounts also describe MacDonald as the first "innocent" Ripper victim and reference senior investigators and media spokesmen as stating their belief MacDonald's murderer had "mistaken" her as a sex worker or woman of loose morals.)

As MacDonald was only sixteen, had only recently left school, and was evidently neither promiscuous or engaged in prostitution, her death caused a public outcry, with petitions instigated calling for the restoration of capital punishment in the United Kingdom and a renewed intensity by West Yorkshire Police to apprehend the perpetrator. Shortly thereafter, the Chief Constable of West Yorkshire Police, Ronald Gregory, appointed his most senior detective to lead the investigation to apprehend the perpetrator.

Gregory appointed George Oldfield, an individual with 31 years' experience with West Yorkshire Police, to lead the investigation. Oldfield—then an assistant chief constable—publicly staked his reputation on apprehending the Yorkshire Ripper. (Note: Prior to the appointment of George Oldfield, each attack and murder ascribed to the Ripper had been dealt with on an individual, ad hoc basis, with a different investigator assigned to each case. Each inquiry had then been scrutinized within Millgarth Police Station to determine whether the attack was linked to the coordinated manhunt.)

=== Initial inquiries ===
Initial police inquiries of individuals who had been in the vicinity of Reginald Street—a reasonably busy thoroughfare at weekends—identified three hundred and eighty individuals who had driven through or walked along the street in the early hours of 26 June. All but twenty were either traced or came forward to eliminate themselves from the police inquiry. Only one of these twenty individuals had been standing alone near the entrance to the adventure playground; he had been a "strongly built" white male. In addition, one of the residents of Reginald Street was also adamant she had heard banging, scuffling and a man with a distinctive Scottish accent shouting obscenities from the vicinity of the playground at the estimated time of MacDonald's death. This individual was also never traced. An anonymous telephone hotline number was also established and extensively publicised to encourage anonymous public tips from individuals suspecting the identity of the perpetrator. This automated service generated hundreds of leads, although none named the actual perpetrator.

By September, inquiries into MacDonald's murder had seen the residents of six hundred and seventy-nine homes in the immediate vicinity of Reginald Street interviewed, with approximately 3,700 witness statements taken. However, investigators were no closer to apprehending the perpetrator than they had been at the beginning of the Ripper inquiry some eighty-eight weeks previously.

== Perpetrator's arrest ==
The Yorkshire Ripper was not arrested until 2 January 1981. His arrest occurred in Broomhill, Sheffield, South Yorkshire, following a routine police check by a probationary constable after he had been observed kerb crawling and which revealed his car had false number plates.

Transferred to Dewsbury the following day, the individual, Peter Sutcliffe, admitted having stolen the number plates from a scrapyard. He was then questioned in relation to the Ripper case, of which he denied any culpability. That evening, one of the two officers who had arrested Sutcliffe returned to the scene of the arrest, where he discovered a ball-pein hammer and a knife that Sutcliffe had discarded beneath some bushes behind an oil storage tank while ostensibly urinating immediately prior to being taken into custody.

=== Confession ===
Following several hours of intensive questioning on the afternoon of 4 January, Detective Inspector John Boyle informed Sutcliffe that an officer had recovered a knife and ball-pein hammer at the site of his arrest the previous evening. Upon hearing these revelations, Sutcliffe fell silent as Boyle added: "I think you're in trouble, serious trouble." In response, Sutcliffe indicated that he knew just what Boyle was implying before elaborating that he was indeed the Yorkshire Ripper. He claimed to be relieved that he had been caught, adding that he would have killed the girl in his car had he not been arrested.

Over the following seventeen hours, Sutcliffe confessed to thirteen murders and seven attempted murders. He was formally charged with these offences on 5 January. (Note: When questioned with regards to MacDonald's murder, Sutcliffe claimed he "still [felt] bad" about her murder after reading she was "so young" and not a prostitute. He would also elaborate that on the Saturday afternoon prior to her death, he and his wife had, by appointment, first viewed the property in Garden Lane, Heaton, which they would purchase for £15,000 in September 1977. To celebrate, he had visited a Chapeltown pub that evening. Hours later, he observed MacDonald walking home.)

=== Conviction ===
Sutcliffe was brought to trial before Judge Sir Leslie Boreham at the Old Bailey in May 1981, charged with thirteen murders and seven attempted murders. He was convicted of all counts by a majority verdict of 10 to 2 on 22 May. He was sentenced to a term of life imprisonment with a recommendation he serve a minimum of thirty years' imprisonment.

Following Sutcliffe's sentencing, MacDonald's mother, Irene, expressed her wish that capital punishment had not been abolished in the United Kingdom. She lamented that she wished Sutcliffe was going to the gallows and hoped that other prisoners would make every minute of his time in prison a living hell for him.

A 1977 Reclaim the Night protest march held in demonstration against ongoing threats of sexual harassment and violence against women in addition to societal misogyny

== Aftermath ==
=== Reclaim the Night Movement ===
Within six months of MacDonald's murder and in part inspired by the Women's Liberation Movement, the first of many nationwide Reclaim the Night marches and protests was held in Leeds. This particular march—organised by the Leeds Revolutionary Feminist Group—occurred in November 1977. The inspiration for the march was largely due to a police response to the Ripper attacks and murders that, to remain safe, women should stay out of public spaces after dark; however, the march was also a protest against the ongoing threats of rape, violence, and sexual harassment women face. In addition, many women were equally outraged at contemporary societal misogynistic attitudes towards women which had seen some of the victims deemed less deserving of police and media focus than others.

Solidarity marches in cities as far afield from Leeds as Lancaster and London were held on the same date, with participants waving placards bearing messages such as "We mourn ALL the victims of male violence against women" and "It could have been me". Although few initial marches attracted large numbers of participants, by 1979 and 1980, the number of participants in these marches had increased substantially, with participants and organisers creating sophisticated support and communication networks later described by University of Bradford professor Hilary Rose as being reminiscent of "that sense of community that was shown in the Blitz."

=== Father's death ===
MacDonald's father, Wilfred, who identified his daughter's body, died at age 60 on 10 October 1979. His wife later stated that he never recovered from their daughter's murder and the sight of her body in the morgue, adding that he had developed nervous asthma and chronic bronchitis within weeks of their bereavement, was unable to work, and that his will to live diminished. Wilfred was buried alongside his daughter in Harehills Cemetery.

At Wilfred's eulogy, family friends repeated a reflective sentence he had frequently recited following his daughter's murder and prior to his own death: "She smelled so sweet, so clean, when she bent down to kiss me goodbye. She was untouched and perfect, just like a flower."

When you hate women as much as he must, any woman will do. Prostitutes are simply more vulnerable targets.

— Spokeswoman for Leeds Rape Crisis Centre, speaking to the media shortly after the murder of Jayne MacDonald. Summer 1977.

=== Byford Report ===
The December 1981 Byford Report into the police investigation of the Yorkshire Ripper case was markedly critical of the numerous investigative failings made during the hunt for the Ripper. The report was also critical of police and societal attitudes pertaining to perceived lifestyles of several of the victims of the Ripper and the fact MacDonald's death elicited a more sympathetic response from both the public and the press in addition to galvanizing police into appointing a more senior investigator to oversee the investigation, which by June 1977 had been ongoing for twenty months.

Within the report, Sir Lawrence Byford also references the fact that at the time of MacDonald's murder, police—who had described MacDonald as a "respectable young girl" who was mistaken by the Ripper as a prostitute—had failed to consider "the possibility that any unaccompanied woman was a potential Ripper victim" at the time of her murder.

=== Bereavement accountability ruling ===
On 5 March 1982, a High Court registrar ruled Sutcliffe must pay Irene MacDonald the sum of £6,722 (the equivalent of approximately £24,180 as of 2026) for the loss of her daughter. This ruling proved to be the first instance in the United Kingdom in which a convicted criminal was held personally accountable for damages inflicted upon his victim. However, due to ongoing receivership and subsequent insolvency issues pertaining to Sutcliffe's assets at the time of this ruling and his subsequently being declared bankrupt in 1984, these damages were never paid.

=== Public apology ===
In 2020, the Chief Constable of West Yorkshire Police, John Robins, issued a formal public apology for the mistakes made by his predecessors in their efforts to apprehend the Yorkshire Ripper, as well as for the callous and misogynistic comments and attitudes of senior investigators involved in the manhunt. This public apology was primarily addressed to the families of the Ripper's murder victims and those who survived his attempted murders. Robins expressed regret for the additional distress and anxiety caused to all relatives by the language, tone, and terminology used by senior officers at the time in relation to Peter Sutcliffe's victims. He acknowledged that such language and attitudes may have reflected wider societal attitudes of the day, but emphasized such attitudes were "as wrong then as [they are] now".

== Media ==
=== Bibliography ===
- Lee, Carol Ann (2019). Somebody's Mother, Somebody's Daughter: True Stories from Victims and Survivors of the Yorkshire Ripper. London: Michael O'Mara Books. ISBN 978-1-782-43925-7.

=== Television ===
- The Yorkshire Ripper's New Victims (2021). A 90-minute documentary commissioned by Channel 5 (British TV channel) and directed by Heenan Bhatti. This documentary was first broadcast in March 2021 and features interviews with both suspected Ripper victims and contemporary investigators.
- The 2023 drama series The Long Shadow is directly based on the manhunt to apprehend the Yorkshire Ripper. The series illustrates the impact of the crimes and ongoing manhunt upon the victims, their families, investigators and society in general. Commissioned by ITV1 and directed by Lewis Arnold, the seven-part series was broadcast between September and November 2023.

== See also ==
- Crime in the United Kingdom
- Reclaim the Night

== Cited works and further reading ==
- Bilton, Michael (2003). Wicked Beyond Belief: The Hunt for the Yorkshire Ripper. Glasgow: Harper Collins. ISBN 978-0-007-16963-4.
- Boar, Roger (1991). Crooks, Crime and Corruption. Dorchester: Dorset Press. ISBN 978-0-880-29615-1.
- Burn, Gordon (1993). Somebody's Husband, Somebody's Son: The Story of Peter Sutcliffe. London: Mandarin Publishing. ISBN 978-0-749-31331-9.
- Campbell, Duncan (1993). Murder in Cold Blood. London: Books U.K. Ltd. ISBN 978-1-871-61216-5.
- Cawthorne, Nigel; Tibballs, Geoff (1993). Killers. London: Boxtree. ISBN 0-7522-0850-0.
- Cobb, Richard Charles (2023). Convicting the Yorkshire Ripper: The Trial of Peter Sutcliffe. Barnsley: Pen and Sword Books. ISBN 978-1-399-01190-7.
- Cross, Roger (1981). The Yorkshire Ripper: The In-depth Study of a Mass Killer and His Methods. Hammersmith, London: Harper Collins Publishers. ISBN 978-0-586-05526-7.
- Gaute, J. H. H. (1991). The New Murderers' Who's Who. New York: Dorset Press. ISBN 978-0-747-23270-4.
- Jones, Barbara (1993). Voices from an Evil God. London: Blake Publishing Ltd. ISBN 978-1-857-82065-2.
- Jouve, Nicole Ward (1986). The Street Cleaner: The Yorkshire Ripper Case on Trial. London: Marion Boyars Publishers. ISBN 978-0-714-52884-7.
- Keppel, Robert D.; Birnes, William J. (2003). The Psychology of Serial Killer Investigations: The Grisly Business Unit. San Diego: Academic Press. p. 37. ISBN 978-0-124-04260-5.
- Lane, Brian (1995). Chronicle of 20th Century Murder. Bournemouth: Select Editions. ISBN 978-0-425-14649-1.
- Lane, Brian; Gregg, Wilfred (1995) [1992]. The Encyclopedia Of Serial Killers. New York City: Berkley Books. pp. 350–353. ISBN 978-0-747-23731-0.
- Nicholson, Michael (1979). The Yorkshire Ripper: The Authoritative Study of the Most Vicious Series of Murders This Century. Isle of Man: Star Book Service. ISBN 978-0-352-30616-6.
- Ressler, Robert K.; Schactman, Tom (1992). Whoever Fights Monsters: My Twenty Years Hunting Serial Killers for the FBI. Sydney: Simon & Schuster Ltd. ISBN 978-0-671-71561-8.
- Wade, Stephen (2005). Foul Deeds and Suspicious Deaths around Bradford. Barnsley: Wharncliffe Books. ISBN 1-903425-83-2.
- Whittington-Egan, Richard; Whittington-Egan, Molly (1992). The Murder Almanac. Glasgow: Neil Wilson Publishing. ISBN 978-1-897-78404-4.
- Wilson, Colin; Wilson, Damon (2007). The World's Most Evil Murderers: Real-Life Stories of Infamous Killers. Bath: Parragon Publishing. ISBN 978-1-405-48828-0.
- Wilson, Colin, ed. (1997). "Murder in Mind – The Yorkshire Ripper". Murder in Mind (2). Marshall Cavendish. ISSN 1364-5803.
- Wynn, Douglas (1996). On Trial for Murder. London: Pan Books. pp. 305–307. ISBN 978-0-09-472990-2.
- Yallop, David (2014) [1981]. Deliver Us from Evil. London: Constable & Robinson Limited. ISBN 978-1-472-11658-1.
