= James McDonald (writer) =

Non-fiction writer (21st century)

- Born: James McDonald; Bexleyheath, England
- Occupations: Writer, historian, mathematician
- Website: https://www.jamesmcdonald.info/

James McDonald is a British mathematician, etymologist, historian, theologian and non-fiction writer.

He writes on topics including Gnostic Dualism, the Cathars of the Languedoc and their theology, the Counts of Toulouse, Occitania, Medieval warfare and the Medieval Inquisition. His work is characterised by combining serious scholarship with an entertaining style. He has also written on subjects as diverse as computer simulation, mathematical problems, philosophy, etymology and comparative philology. For several years he wrote a weekly column on English word origins for the Sunday Express, a national newspaper in the UK.

He has travelled in Central Asia and Southern Asia, researching Zoroastrianism and other ancient religions. According to his publishers his book Beyond Belief took over 20 years of research, including an overland expedition from Europe to South and Central Asia, retracing the journeys of Alexander the Great, Robert Byron and Eric Newby. This research took him to sites including Medjugorje in Herzegovina; traditional Bogomil sites in the Balkans, early Christian sites across Turkey, the Mountains of Ararat near the border with Iran, Zoroastrian Towers of Silence, Chak Chak and other Zoroastrian centres in Iran, Christian churches in Pakistan, Parsee temples in Mumbi, the Syrian Churches of Kerala, the Roza Bal shrine at Srinagar in Kashmir; Lumbini in the Rupandehi district of Nepal; early Buddhist sites along the Karakorum Highway, and historic religious sites of Tajikistan and Uzbekistan.

He was educated in the UK at University College, Oxford, and at Sussex and Nottingham Universities. He holds an MA in mathematics from Oxford University, an MSc in Operational Research from Sussex University and an MA in history and theology from the Nottingham University. He was elected a Fellow of the Royal Geographical Society in London in 1990. He is a life member of Humanists UK. His biography in the 5th edition of his book Voltaire on the Cathars notes that he is one of a small but growing number of atheist theologians.

He is the châtelain of the Château Saint-Ferriol, a late medieval/early Renaissance castle, in the village and commune of Saint-Ferriol, in the Aude département in the South of France which is listed as a Monument Historique by the French government.

== Publications ==
- Wordly Wise, on comparative philology, published by Constable (now Constable & Robinson) (UK) and Franklin Watts (USA)
- A Dictionary of Obscenity and Taboo, on etymology, published by Sphere (Little, Brown and Company) and reprinted by Wordsworth (UK & USA)
- Solving Business Problems using Simulation, published by McGraw Hill (UK & USA)
- Beyond Belief, on the History of Christianity, Published by Garnet Publishers
- Voltaire on the Cathars, an annotated translation of Voltaire's Essai sur les moeurs et l'esprit des nations, ch LXII, (1756), ISBN 978-1795075367, the 5th Edition of On The Crusade against the people of the Languedoc
- Bones of Contention: The improbable history of the remains of Saint Edmund (Academy of Cathar Historical Studies - Monographs), 2020, an historical investigation into the fate of the remains of King Edmund and those of three medieval inquisitors ISBN 979-8602990225
- Kill Them All: Did a Medieval Abbot give this Command to his Troops (Academy of Cathar Historical Studies - Monographs), 2020, ISBN 979-8607444303. An account of the massacre at Béziers by a Catholic army led by a Cistercian abbot in 1209. It is a detailed analysis of the arguments for and against the Abbot having given the order "Kill them all ..." as recorded by the Cistercian chronicler Caesarius of Heisterbach.
