= Jeanne Sarson =

Human rights activist

- Education: B.Sc, Nursing
- Occupation: Nurse
- Website: https://www.nonstatetorture.org/

Jeanne Sarson is the Co-Founder of the Non-State Torture (NST) and a Human Rights Defender based in Canada.

== Education and early life ==
Sarson was born in Halifax, Nova Scotia, Canada as an Acadian-Metis descent. She is a B.Sc., Nursing graduate from Yarmouth Regional Hospital School of Nursing, Yarmouth, Nova Scotia, Canada. Achieving a Bachelor of Science in Nursing from Dalhousie University, followed by a Masters in Education from St. Mary's University. Sarson's mother separated from her violent alcoholic father and raised Sarson with her younger brother. Sarson later moved to Inuvik, Northwest Territories, where she married. Sarson spent eleven years living and working across the Canadian Arctic and then moved to Prince Edward Island and back to Nova Scotia. Sarson has twin sons and a grandson.

Jeanne Sarson and Linda MacDonald co-founded the Non-State Torture also known as ‘Persons Against Non-State Torture including Ritual Abuse-Torture (RAT).’ They work as activists against NST (Non-State Torture).

== Awards and recognitions ==
Jeanne Sarson and Linda MacDonald received the women of Peace Awards from Women's Peace Power Foundation. Women's Media Centre Live interviewed Jeanne Sarson about Non-State Torture on 2015.

Sarson has received the excellence award in Nursing Practice; and as a former member of the Canadian Federation of University Women, she won the International Relations Award.
