= James McDonald (businessman) =

American oil industrialist

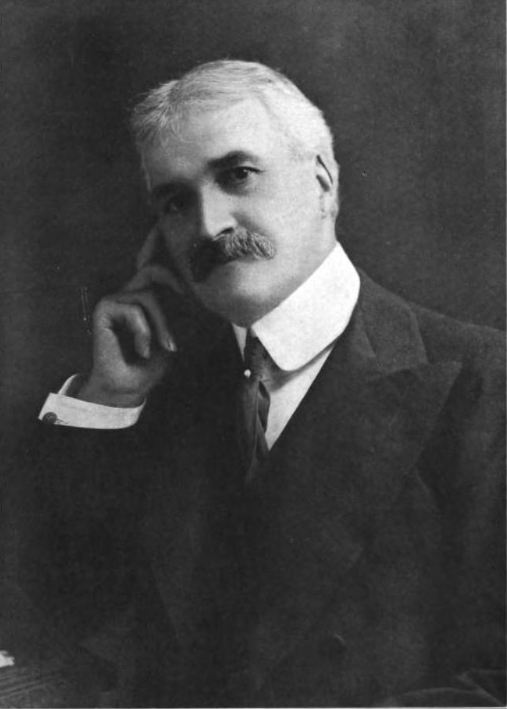
- Born: September 12, 1843; Moray, Scotland
- Died: January 15, 1915 (aged 71); Washington, D.C., United States
- Occupation: Businessman
- Spouse: Isabella J. McDonald (m. 1903)
- Children: 1

James McDonald (September 12, 1843 – January 15, 1915) was a British-born American oil industrialist.

== Early life ==
James McDonald was born in Wellhead, Morayshire, in North Scotland on September 23, 1840. He was the son of Alexander McDonald and Janet McKenzie McDonald. He was twice married, his second wife being Isabella J. McDonald, whom he married in Brighton, England, on July 27, 1903. He had one child, James McDonald Jr. who was born in Cincinnati, Ohio, on May 8, 1890.

McDonald came to the United States in early childhood. He received his education in the Academy and High Schools of Chillicothe, Ohio, and later attended a Military Academy in Talbot County, Maryland.

McDonald enlisted in the Union Army at the outbreak of the Civil War and served in the Quartermaster's Department as Civilian Clerk, going through the Georgia campaign with Sherman's Army and also through other campaigns.

== Career ==
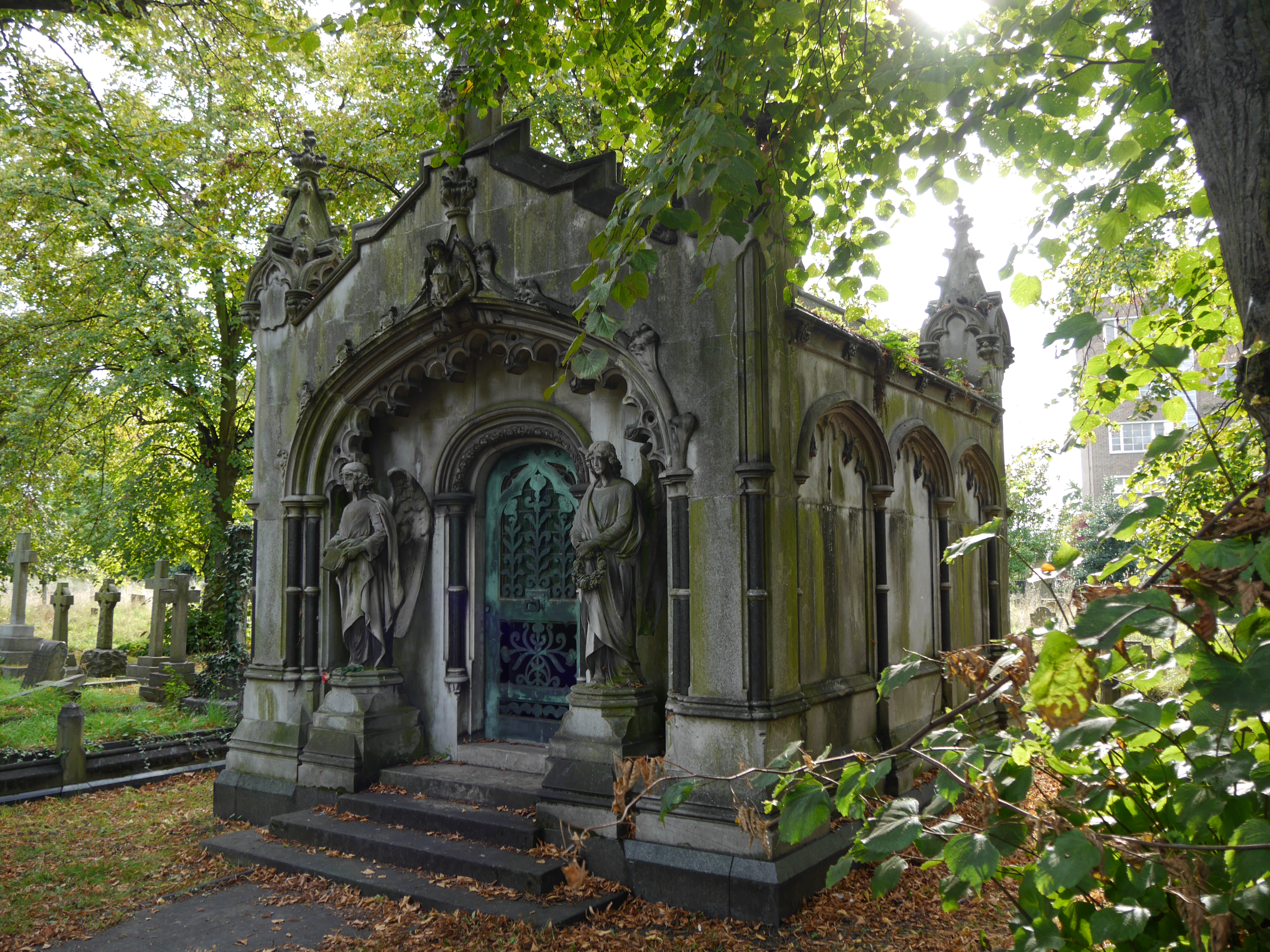
McDonald mausoleum, Brompton Cemetery

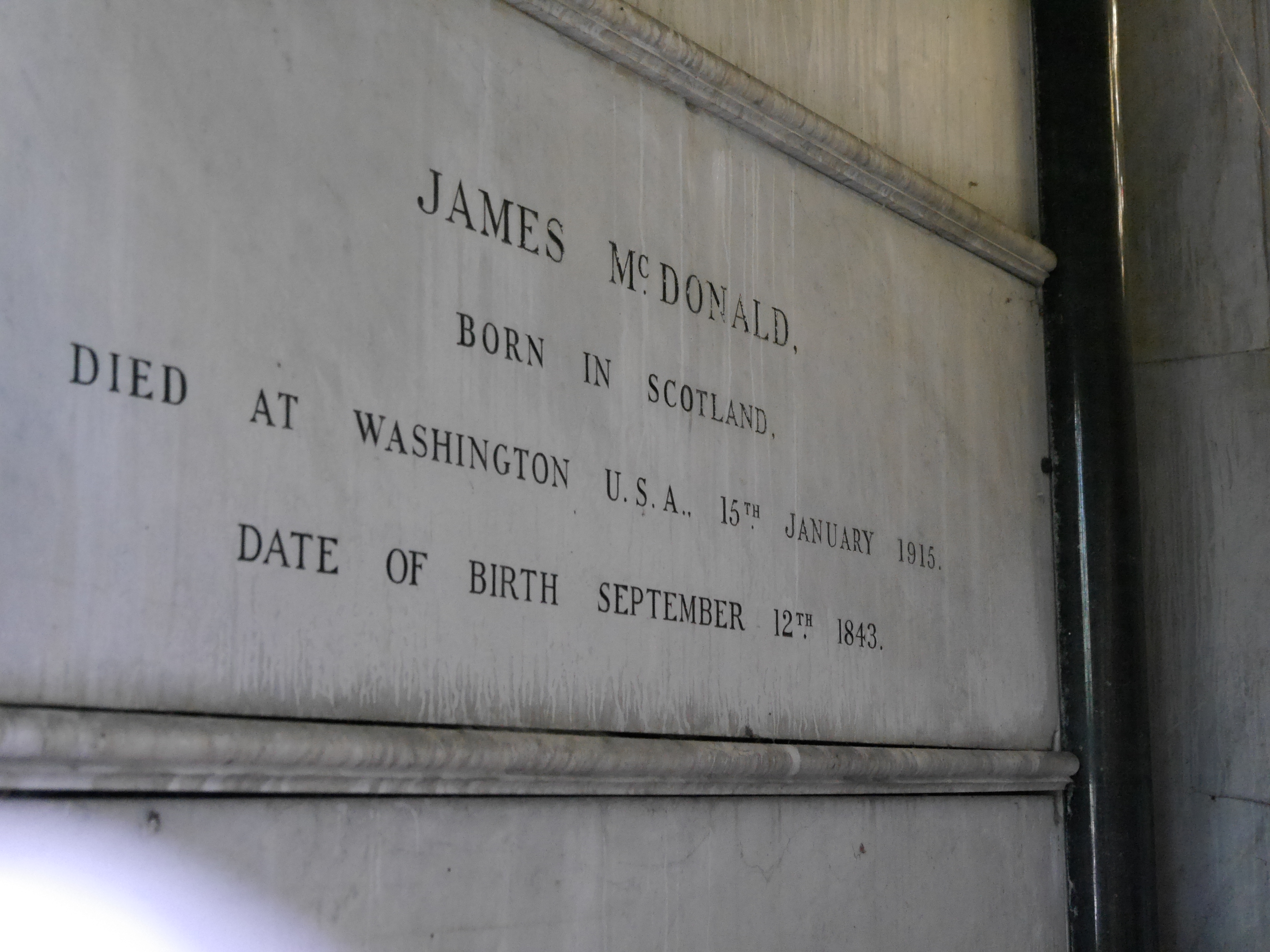
Interior

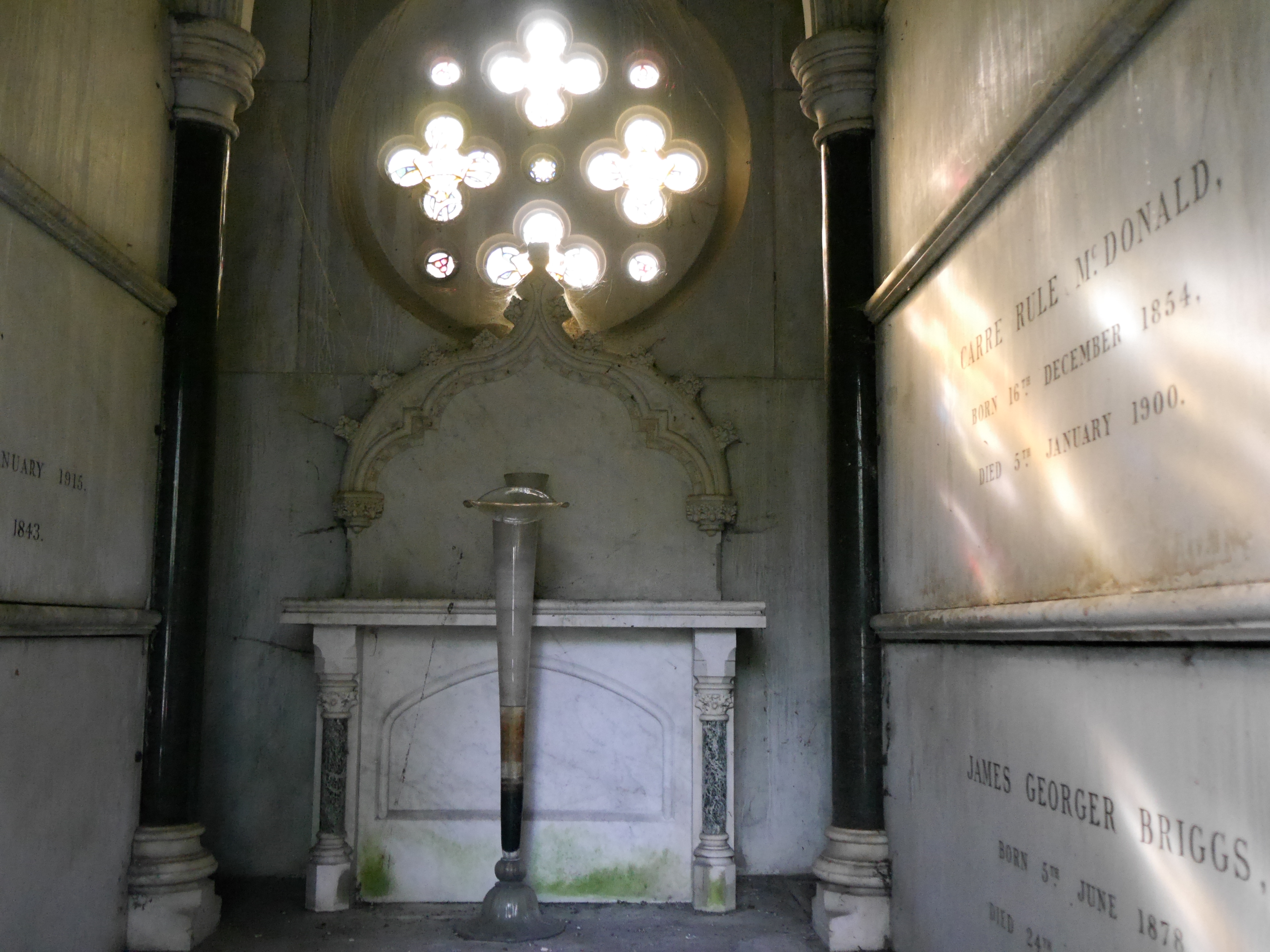
Interior

At the close of the American Civil War, McDonald and his brother Alexander settled in Cincinnati. They entered the petroleum business and founded the Consolidated Tank Line Company. They were among the largest independent operators in the country when the Standard Oil Company was formed, so they formed a business connection with it, although they did not sell outright. Their business grew until 1890, when they decided to exchange their stock for that of Standard Oil of New Jersey, thus becoming part of the larger corporation.

Alexander McDonald became President of the Standard Oil Company of Kentucky and James McDonald went to England to aid in the organization and development of the Anglo-American Oil Company (later becoming Esso UK), another subsidiary of the Standard Oil Company.

McDonald was made Chairman of the Anglo-American Oil Company and also became a director in various other companies throughout Europe. He was the representative of the parent organization in all of its dealings with the foreign companies.

McDonald was also charged with the details of supplying the petroleum and was in command of the oil tank steamers operated by the Anglo-American Oil Company and other organizations, between America and Europe and between European ports. He had an active part in the designing and building of the vessels. He worked many hours per day and deprived himself of sleep.

In 1906, McDonald developed an affliction of the heart and was compelled to retire from all active business. After that time, he travelled to different parts of the world in search of health, under orders of his physicians to avoid exertion, physical or mental, as much as possible. Finding it necessary to live in a warm climate, he went to Southern California in the winter of 1911–1912 and spent the season there, planning the return each winter in the future. McDonald died on January 13, 1915, in Washington, D.C. and was buried in the family mausoleum in Brompton Cemetery.

From the time he went to England to reside, McDonald made his home in London, with only occasional visits to the United States. He built a residence in Cadogan Square and took a prominent part in the social life of the metropolis.

McDonald was one of the leading clubmen of London, being a member of the Empire, Bathe, Ranelagh and Royal Automobile Clubs and also of Phyllis Court, in Henley-on-Thames. He was also a regular member of St. Columba's Church, London.
