= Jim McDonald (footballer, born 1877) =

Australian rules footballer

Personal information
- Full name: James Alexander McDonald
- Born: 7 March 1877; Wyndham Vale, Victoria
- Died: 7 March 1968 (aged 91); St Kilda East, Victoria

Playing career^{1}
Years	Club	Games (Goals)
1903–06	Essendon	28 (2)
- ^{1} Playing statistics correct to the end of 1906.

James Alexander McDonald (7 March 1877 – 7 March 1968) was an Australian rules footballer who played with Essendon in the Victorian Football League (VFL).
