= Jim McDonald (soccer) =

Canadian former soccer defender (born 1954)

Jimmy McDonald
Personal information
- Date of birth: 3 May 1954 (age 72)
- Place of birth: Glasgow, Scotland
- Position: Defender

Senior career*
Years	Team	Apps	(Gls)
1973	Toronto Metros	4	(0)
1973–1974	Toronto Hungaria		
1979–1980	Cleveland Force (indoor)	3	(0)

International career
1973	Canada U-20	3	(0)
1973–1974	Canada	4	(0)
- * Club domestic league appearances and goals

Jim McDonald (born in Glasgow, Scotland on 3 May 1954) is a Canadian former soccer defender who played professionally in the North American Soccer League. He played four times for the Canadian national soccer team and was a member of the

== National team ==
McDonald earned four caps for the Canada men's national soccer team in 1973 and 1974. He played in four straight internationals for Canada in their back four - in 1973, on 7 October in a 2–0 away win over Luxemburg; 10 November in a 1–5 away lose to and 12 November in a 1–0 away win over Haiti both played in Port-au-Prince; and on 14 April 1974 in a 0–0 away draw to Bermuda in Hamilton. He also played for the Canadian Pan American Games soccer team in Mexico and McDonald also earned 3 caps with the Canada U-20 men's national soccer team at the 1973 CONCACAF Under-20 Championship in Mexico.

== Professional ==
McDonald played one season in the North American Soccer League, 1973 with the Toronto Metros. He also played three games for the Cleveland Force during the 1979-1980 Major Indoor Soccer League season. McDonald played for Toronto Hungaria in 1973 in the National Soccer League, and in the 1974 season. He also played with Toronto Macedonia and London City FC in the National Soccer League.

== Coach ==
After retiring as a player, McDonald entered into coaching. He became the Director of Coaching for the Maple Leaf Soccer Club in Scarborough, Ontario from 1985 to 1988. He then moved to the United States to become the Senior State Coach for Indiana from 1988 to 1991. In 1992 McDonald became the first Director of Coaching for the Center Grove Soccer Club in Greenwood, Indiana and held that position until 2008. He also served as the Region 2 Senior Head Coach of twelve states in the Midwest from 1992 to 1994. In 1993, he was the Assistant Coach at the US Olympic Sports Festival. That year, he also successfully coached the Indianapolis Inferno to the 1992 U.S. Open Cup Semifinal. He was the Director of Coaching for the Inferno from 1989 to 1994. In 1994 McDonald was appointed the Head Coach for the US Olympic Sports Festival but club commitments kept him from the post.

In 2003 as a guest of Sir Alex Ferguson, McDonald was brought in to observe and discuss the Manchester United training sessions for the First Team, Reserve and Youth squads at the Carrington Training Center. In that same year, McDonald was also a guest of John Greig of the Glasgow Rangers to observe and discuss the training of their First Team, Reserve and Youth squads. The following year he also was a guest of the Glasgow Celtic for three weeks participating with the First Team, Reserve and Youth squads. He also observed Hibernian and Motherwell of the Scottish Premier League and Southampton of the English Premier League the following year. He was also hired by Terry Butcher from Motherwell as the North American scout.

In 2008 McDonald became the current director of coaching at a youth club in Belleair/Seminole, Florida called Gulf Coast United Soccer Club (now called Celtic FC Florida).
