= Marcia Lee Macdonald =

American photographer (born 1944)

Marcia Lee Macdonald (born 1944) is an American photographer who worked with gelatin silver prints.

Her work is included in the collections of the National Gallery of Canada, the Harvard Art Museums, the Art Institute of Chicago, the Princeton University Art Museum, and the RISD Museum.
