= Jamie MacDonald (Finnish comedian) =

Finnish stand up comedian

Jamie Lórien MacDonald (born 12 June 1977 in Vancouver, Canada) is a Canadian-born Finnish stand up comedian.

MacDonald started his stand up career in 2012. He is the host of the Feminist Comedy Night comedy event started in 2015. He also hosts the Comedy Idiot club together with Aatu Raitala, the Punch Up! – Resistance & Glitter show together with Juuso Kekkonen and Mira Eskelinen as well as the Attic Underground event. Punch Up! was awarded the Theatre Act of the Year 2021 award by the Finnish Centre for Theatre. He has also been part of the performance Transformations – Otteita maskuliinisuuden sanakirjasta combining spoken theatre, dance and stand up comedy, directed by Teemu Mäki as well was the Manning Up document by Aira Vehaskari. MacDonald was awarded Comedian of the Year in 2016.

MacDonald was born in Vancouver and moved to Finland in 2002. His mother is Finnish. MacDonald has studied performance arts and its theory at the Helsinki Theatre Academy.

On his gigs, MacDonald bases his humour on his transsexuality experience. MacDonald started gender transition at the age of 35.
