= Jim McDonald (Northern Ireland) =

Northern Irish Catholic Unionist

Jim McDonald (James McDonald) (1936/1937-2019) CBE, LVO, KCSG, GCHS, JP, DL was a Northern Irish Catholic Unionist.

McDonald served as the first Chairman of the Royal Ulster Constabulary George Cross Foundation and Chancellor of the Papal Orders in Ireland.

McDonald was born and raised in a devoutly Catholic family off the Falls Road close to Clonard Monastery in West Belfast, a nationalist/republican stronghold.
