= Michael Rush (rower) =

Australian rower

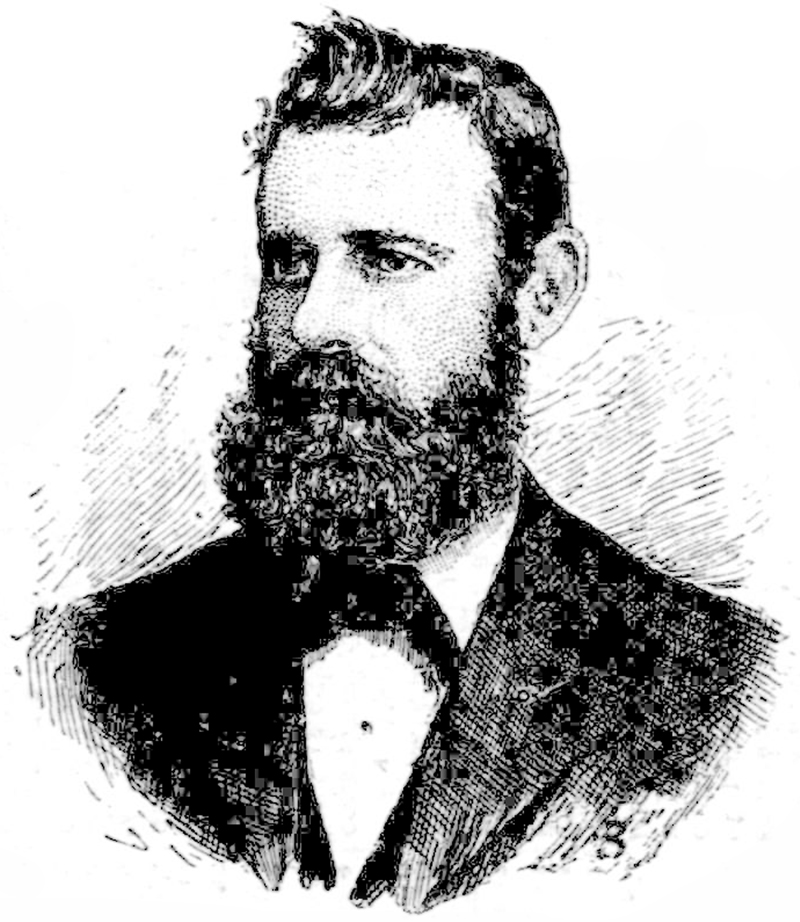
- Michael Rush ca. 1874

Personal information
- Nationality: Irish Australian
- Born: 3 January 1844 Dooish Townland, County Tyrone, Ireland
- Died: 17 December 1922 (aged 78) Hurstville, New South Wales Australia

Sport
- Sport: Rowing (sculling)
- Retired: ca. 1888

Michael Rush (3 January 1844 – 17 December 1922) was an Irish Australian sculler noted for his one-on-one competitions against champion opponents, which drew vast crowds of spectators. He attempted to win the World Sculling Championship.

Rush arrived in Sydney from Ireland in 1861 at the age of 16, an assisted immigrant brought to augment Australia's mostly agricultural workforce. Rush was a farm labourer, who knew nothing of boats or boating, but within ten years of his arrival in Australia, Rush was Champion Sculler of the Clarence River, as well as a selector, cattle-raiser and butcher. His interest in the sport of rowing dominated Rush's life, and hampered his prosperity. He repeatedly travelled from his Clarence River home to compete for large money prizes on Sydney's Parramatta River, neglecting his business affairs.

Rush became Champion Sculler of Australia in 1873, and defended his championship several times, not always successfully. Rush succeeded on a few occasions in having the Championship venue moved from Sydney to the Clarence River, the first to shift the focus of sculling away from the capital city. From 1874, there was talk of Rush travelling to England to compete for the World Sculling Championship, but this did not eventuate. Instead, Edward Trickett won the World Championship on the Thames in 1876. Rush and Trickett in 1877 competed on the Parramatta River for the World Championship, but Rush lost this race.

Rush was unique in early Australian sculling in that he provided opportunities for others to compete and excel, by organising regattas and other rowing events, though financially he gained little. He raised and raced horses, organised athletic carnivals, and was a generous supporter of charities, churches, and schools. His background as the son of Irish tenant farmers, a class traditionally debarred by law from owning land and hence accumulating wealth, gave Rush little understanding of the management of money. Rush and his wife had fourteen children, and the Rush family lived in grand, if not extravagant style; most Rush enterprises were financed by mortgages or promissory notes. When the Banks Crash of 1893 came, Rush was not only deeply in debt, he did not even own the house he lived in.

Though his finances remained shaky, and his attempts at various business enterprises were unsuccessful, Rush continued to the end of his life to be interested and involved in the sport of rowing and sculling, organising carnivals and umpiring important matches. Rush died on his small farm in Hurstville, in December 1922.

== Youth and early life ==
Rush was the second son of William and Margery Rush née McGrath. He was born and spent his early years on a tenant farm in the Townland of Dooish, County Tyrone, in the province of Ulster, now Northern Ireland. The Rushes were cattle-raisers, but their 26-acre holding was too small to support their family of sons, of whom four have been identified; there were reputedly ten Rush sons. Rush's birth-date is given as 3 January 1844.

Seeking employment and better opportunities than their native land offered, Rush and his brother John emigrated in 1860, arriving in Sydney in February 1861 per Hotspur, as assisted immigrants. The brothers at first worked in Camperdown for their uncle Michael McGrath, a retail (or 'cutting') butcher, who sponsored their immigration. McGrath's brother, Thomas McGrath, was a Champion Sculler of the Colony of New South Wales.

Rush then spent some months as a drover in southern New South Wales, while his brother John, taking advantage of the new Crown Lands Act took up a selection on the Lower Clarence River in 1863. Rush soon joined his brother, at first working for other settlers as a stockman and slaughterman. In 1866, he selected land at Ashby and began business in his own right as a butcher.

== Early rowing matches ==
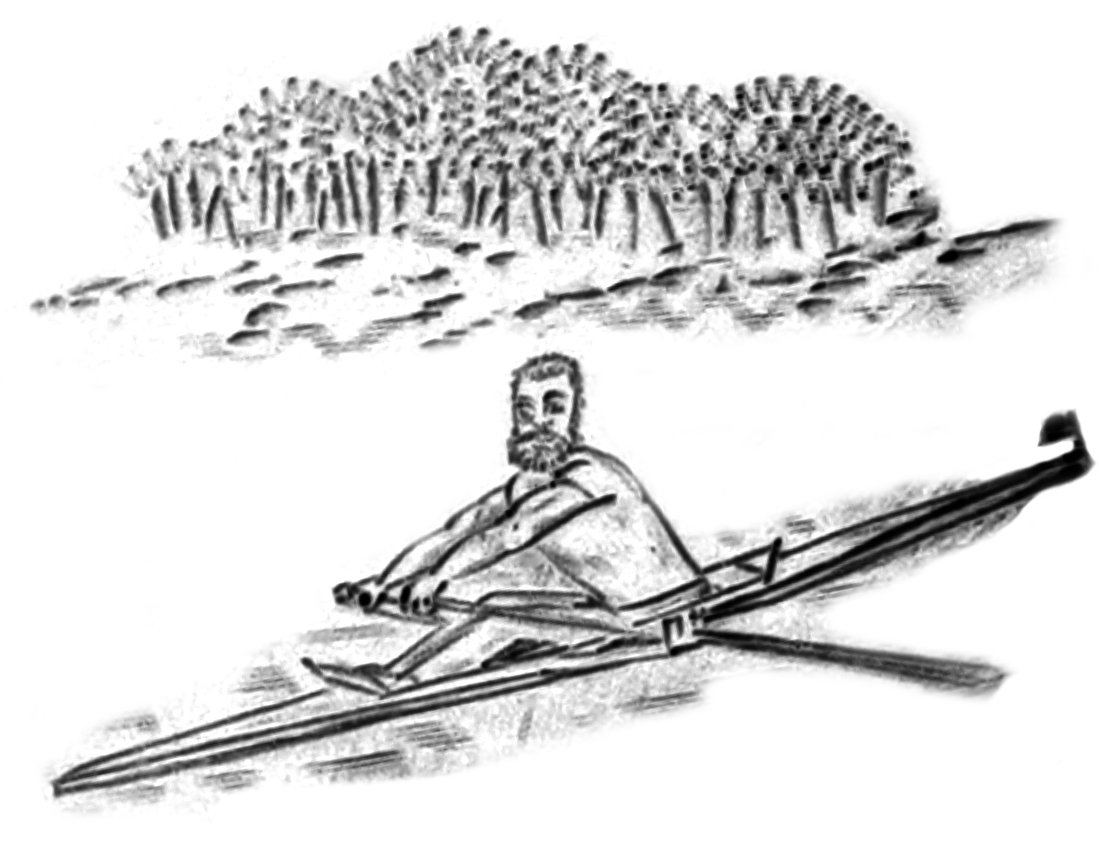
A caricature of Rush at the oars, ca. 1881

During its early days of settlement, the Lower Clarence district lacked roads; virtually all communication within the area and with the outside world depended upon water transport. Lower Clarence settlers were by necessity good oarsmen, and several of them became national and even world champion scullers. Rush, who in his prime was over six feet tall and weighed 13 stone, soon distinguished himself as a powerful 'puller'. (Note: puller is 19th-century slang for an oarsman, specifically one who rows against a tide. See an example of contemporary usage) He rowed the heavy settlers' boats, also known as 'butcher boats' delivering meat to Clarence River customers. By 1866, Rush was competing in various regattas regularly held among the riverside settlements of Ulmarra, Lawrence, Brushgrove and Rocky Mouth.

In 1869, Rush won the title of Champion of the Clarence from Prospero Coulon. The two men then joined forces as a rowing team and competed at the Anniversary Day Regatta of 26 January 1870 held at Port Jackson. Rush and Coulon contested several events, notably winning the single-scull and pair-oar races, and while the prize money they received was modest, their performances were noted by Sydney rowers who quickly challenged them to private matches for large stakes. Rush and Coulon remained in Sydney for some months after the January regatta, and continued to win as a team.

Rush then engaged in a series of one-on-one matches with the scullers William Hickey, the Australian champion, and his brother Richard Hickey. Rush, being unfamiliar with rowing outrigger wager boats, on that occasion failed to win the championship from Hickey, but returned to the Lower Clarence with prize money totalling over £700.

== Business ventures ==
Rush set up as a store-keeper in the town of Rocky Mouth (Maclean). He operated a 'floating store' which was anchored at Chatsworth Island during the sugar-cane harvesting season when hundreds of itinerant labourers moved into the district. His steam launch Jinnie Rush was used as a mobile general store, delivering goods to farmers and villagers along the river. Rush also bought several racing boats, importing 'riggers' (Note: Racing skiffs fitted with steel outriggers) from England, as well as ordering them custom-made from local boatbuilders.

Rush divided his energies between his business ventures and his sculling contests, organising as well as competing in regattas and 'aquatic carnivals', so much so, that he never achieved the solid prosperity of other Clarence River commercial pioneers. He added the Criterion Hotel and a string of race-horses to his business 'empire' at Rocky Mouth. As a former farm-boy from impoverished Ireland, where he might never have owned even a house plot, Rush now purchased many acres of Clarence River land, much of it having little value. Rush's Irish background of tenant farming gave little understanding of managing capital, property, or conducting a business career. Rush fits an Irish immigrant model offered by historian Patrick O'Farrell:

Too often [Irish immigrants] bought extensive tracts of marginal land, just because it was land, and cheap, and their pride was built on quantity... To the dangers of inexperience and chancy judgement, they added an ingredient which made a recipe for disaster – prodigal generosity. They gave loans at no interest, gave money to unreliable friends and relations, were free and imprudent with credit they could not afford, pursued paths of extravagance when thrift was needed and were careless when caution was called for. [T]hey were men with big ideas seeing in the colonies their chance to cut a fine figure and break away from mean Irish lives.

— O'Farrell, The Irish in Australia p.122

== Major sculling matches ==
Rush set his sights on the Australian Sculling Championship, and in February 1873, won it from William Hickey in a controversial match: many claimed that Hickey 'sold' the race. (Note: That is, Hickey deliberately lost, having been paid a large sum of money to do so. Cf. the libel case which followed: "THE LATE CHAMPION SCULLING MATCH". The Empire. 17 April 1873. p. 2.) Rush insisted that the championship be contested on his home waters of the Clarence River. To make this condition was his right as the holder of a current championship. (Note: On the matter of sculling championship customs, cf. "The Championship of the World". Rockhampton Bulletin. Qld. 22 January 1877. p. 3 – via National Library of Australia.) Rush's enterprise in arranging for sponsors to provide substantial sums of prizes encouraged Australia's best scullers to compete. These events drew large crowds of spectators and gamblers to the Clarence River, especially the town of Grafton. Rush helped to organise, and took part in, aquatic contests held Grafton in 1874, and 1875 Two of these were held in conjunction with Grafton's celebration of the Queen's Birthday. (Note: Held each 24 May during the reign of Queen Victoria.) Rush also organised an Intercolonial Regatta, held at Grafton 7 October 1874 at which he successfully defended his championship. However, at the Queen's Birthday regatta of 1875, Rush, who was ill, lost the race to Elias C. Laycock.

=== World Sculling Championship ===
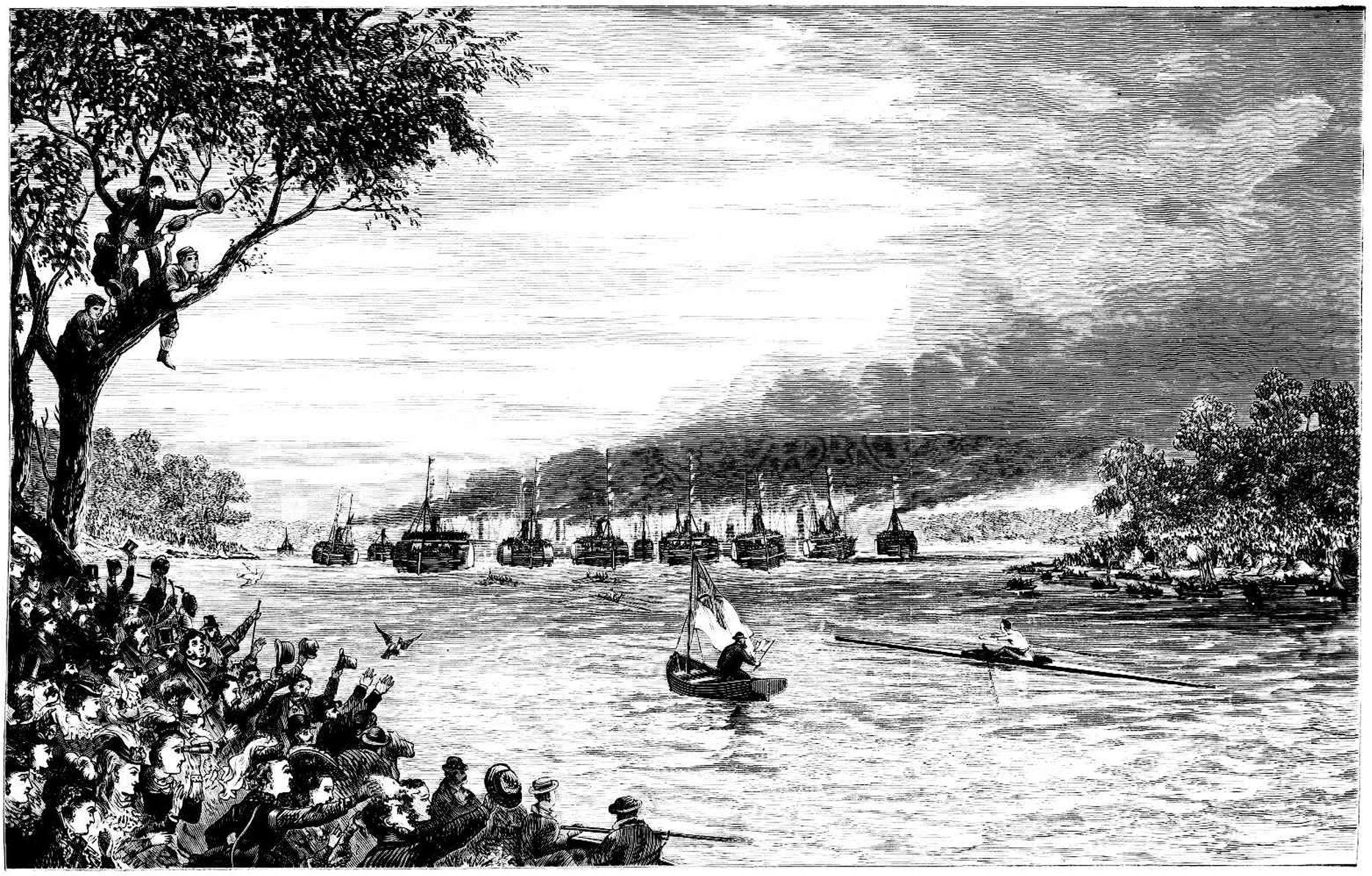
Trickett finishes several lengths ahead of Rush, 30 June 1877. Note the crowds, the flotilla of spectator steamers, and the releasing of carrier pigeons taking news of the race result back to Sydney. Illustrated Sydney News 21 July 1877

Edward 'Ned' Trickett sought to win the Australian Championship from Rush. Trickett was outclassed by Rush at the 1874 and 1875 events, but afterwards competed at numerous regattas and in private matches, and his form was consistently improving. Trickett and his backers demanded that Rush contest the title on the Parramatta River where he won it from Hickey. (Note: The course ran for just over three miles from the present John Whitton Railway Bridge near Meadowbank to a rocky outcrop known as The Brothers, on which stands the Searle Monument, off the present Henley.) Rush declined to row anywhere but on the Clarence River, and demanded that the stakes be not less than £500. By 1875, Rush had a wife and five children to support, as well as many business commitments, and could not afford to undertake a sporting endeavour involving a major investment in time and money, unless there was a chance of an adequate financial return. Dozens of letters and articles in the Australian press debated the issue for nearly two years, as Trickett and his supporters became increasingly incensed at Rush's stalling. Finally, former champion sculler and now a prosperous publican and backer of sculling events, offered to finance an attempt by an Australian sculler to topple the current holder of the World Sculling Championship, Englishman Joseph Sadler. (Note: Only one other Australian sculler had attempted this feat, Richard A. W. Green, in 1863. "Richard Green". The Newsletter: an Australian Paper for Australian People. 25 March 1905. p. 8.) Rush declined to travel to London. Trickett agreed to the journey, went to the Thames, beat Sadler, and brought home the World Championship to Australia. Rush challenged Trickett for the World title. Trickett demanded that the race be rowed on the Parramatta River, and the match came off on the afternoon of 30 June 1877.

=== Largest number of spectators ever at a Sydney sporting event ===
The Rush vs. Trickett match attracted the largest number of spectators ever before gathered at a Sydney sporting event, and the event is part of Australian sporting history. Estimates of the size of the crowd range from 30,000 to 70,000. Shops and government offices closed for the event, special trains brought people into the city. Steam-ships carrying spectators accompanied the competing champions, and hundreds of smaller, private vessels crowded the river. Special Regulations were published by the Marine Board of the NSW Government to deal with the problems of regulating maritime traffic during the event. (Note: This 1877 Regulation created a useful precedent which benefited participants in later contests; spectator vessels frequently hampered and even endangered scullers.)

Rush was soundly beaten, Trickett winning by several lengths. A combination of factors led to Rush's defeat. Trickett had won a World Championship, at an international venue, and he brought home to Australia the polish and self-confidence that arose from this experience. Trickett trained on the Thames, the home of championship sculling, by expert coaches including Harry Kelley. Rush, though trained by the ex-champion Richard Green, remained in effect an amateur, largely self-taught. Rush invented his own sculling technique, based on sheer strength and endurance; his style was often deprecated. Trickett was three inches taller than Rush, and had a longer reach. (Note: However, World Champion sculler Ned Hanlan showed that skill rather than superior physique was the deciding factor for a winning oarsman.) Finally, Trickett learned on the Thames to use racing-craft fitted with a sliding seat, which allowed a more efficient use of the sculler's whole body when rowing. Before the race, Rush tried a sliding seat racing-shell, but could not discover any advantage, and chose instead to row a fixed-seat outrigger. Once the news of Rush's decision became public, betting odds changed dramatically, favouring Trickett, and the result of the race was considered almost a foregone conclusion. Still, Rush was known as an honest sportsman and was expected to put up a mighty effort to beat Trickett. And so he did, but without success.

The celebrations following the match recalled Trickett's return from his London victory in November 1876. The commercial exploitation of the event had been considerable, and thousands of pounds changed hands in wagers, but Trickett and Rush were out of pocket afterwards, Trickett claiming to be considerably so. The stakes were only £200, and expenses such as training, accommodation, advertising, new boats and incidentals made professional sculling an expensive business, as Rush argued beforehand. Trickett claimed a considerable shortfall in gate money from spectator ships, and a public benefit concert was held for him by actor George Darrell. Others spoke up for Rush as a major financial loser from his endeavour.

Most histories of professional Australian sculling commence with this event. By 1877, Australia had a vigorous interest in sport, and a class of professional athletes was emerging. Far from defeating him, the match of 30 June 1877 gave Rush new energy. After a year or two of retirement, he began to train and compete, mastering the sliding seat. He regained his Australian Championship in September 1881.

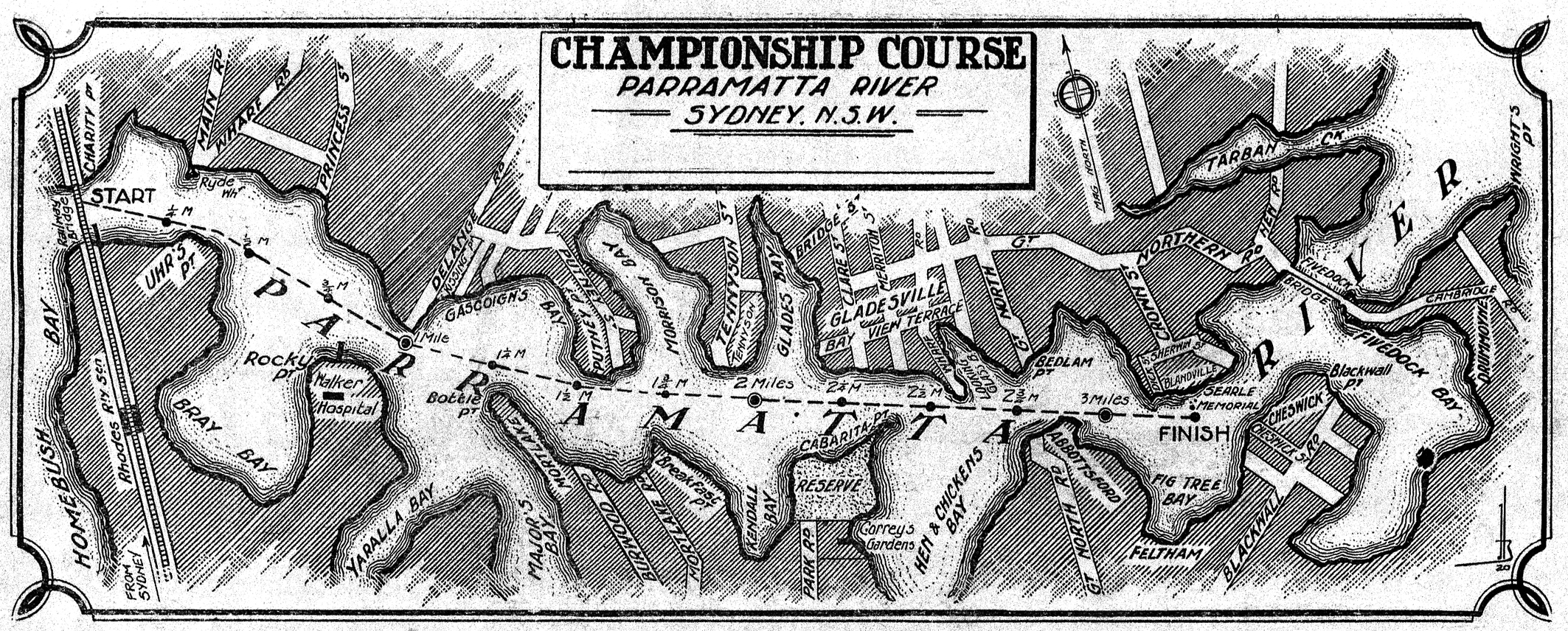
Championship course. Map from 1920s.

=== Rush vs Laycock ===
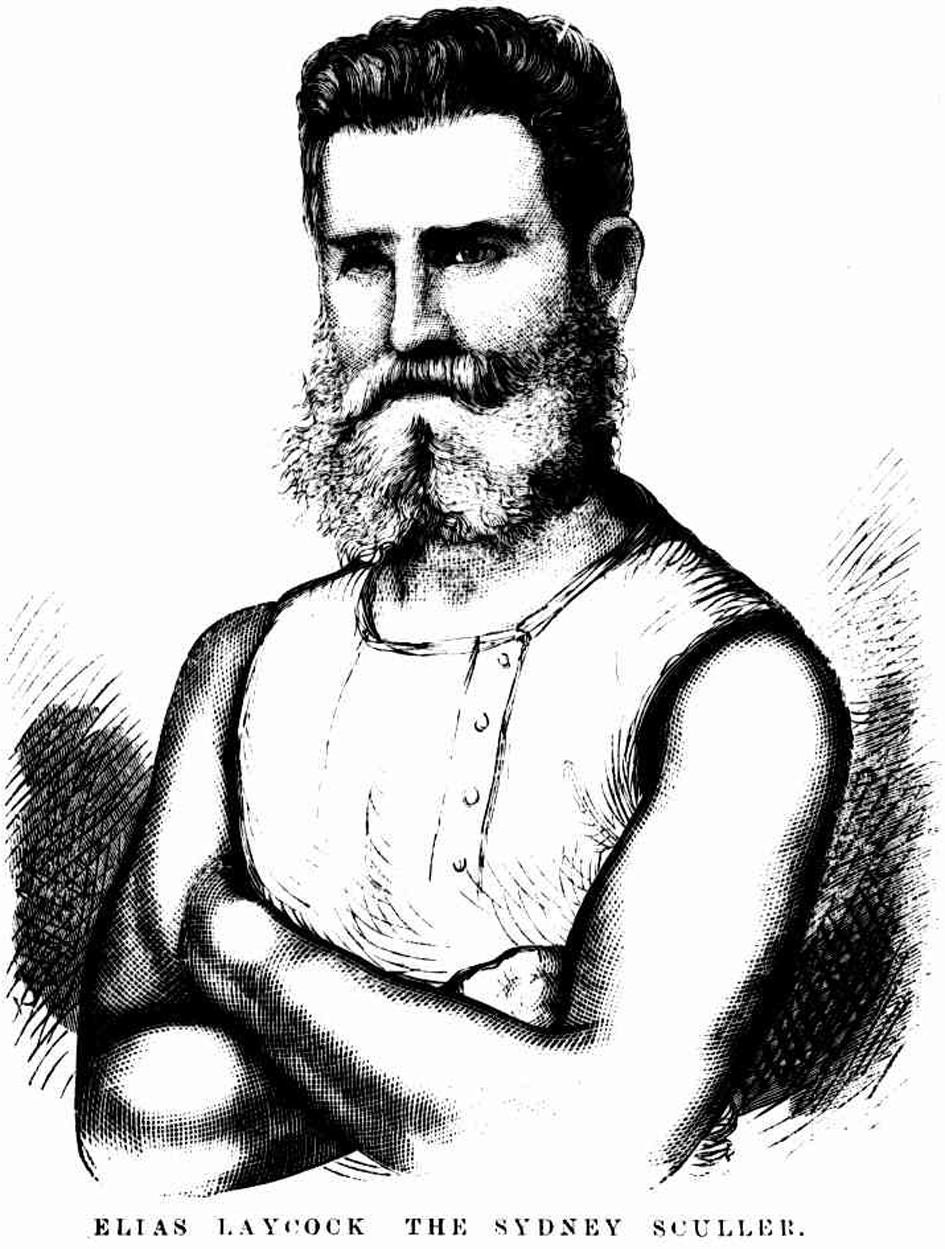
Elias C. Laycock

Elias C. Laycock was his 'chief rival'. Just a year younger than Rush, and like him, a large and powerful man, Laycock came to live on the Lower Clarence River around 1874. The two scullers met first at the Queen's Birthday regatta in Grafton in May 1874. Laycock, untried at boat racing, was beaten, though undeterred. During the following years, Laycock challenged Rush and others to sculling matches, until in April 1879, he beat World Champion Trickett at a State regatta. A series of matches followed to determine the current Australian sculling Champion, who would defend the World Title. (Note: The world sculling community demanded that the World title be contested on the Thames. "TRICKETT V. HANLAN". The Morning Bulletin. 12 September 1879. p. 3.) Laycock beat Rush again and again, but Trickett eventually beat Laycock. Trickett once more went to the Thames to row against Ned Hanlan, but these preliminary contests in Sydney marked the end of Rush's World Championship ambitions.

=== The Walker Whiskey Trophy ===
In April 1881, Mason, Brothers offered a cash prize of £300, to be known as the Walker Whiskey Trophy. The cash prizes attracted so many entrants that a series of preliminary heats was held during September 1881. Rush took part, but was eliminated from the final race. Rush also rowed a number of private matches at this time, notably against J. J. Power, Harry Pearce, both of whom he beat, and Elias Laycock. The match against Laycock was for the Championship of Australia, which Laycock won with ease. Rush announced his retirement from sculling contests, not for the first or the last time. (Note: Rush announced his retirement on at least four occasions, changing his mind afterwards. See Gard Michael Rush)

=== The Francis Punch Trophy ===
Francis Punch was a younger brother of sculler, publican and promoter James 'Jem' Punch. Following the death of James, Francis bought Punch's Hotel. Punch sponsored a sculling prize and though this event did not attract any international entrants, Rush, Trickett and Laycock competed over the Championship course in early October 1882. Rush won not only the Punch Trophy but regained the Australian Championship.

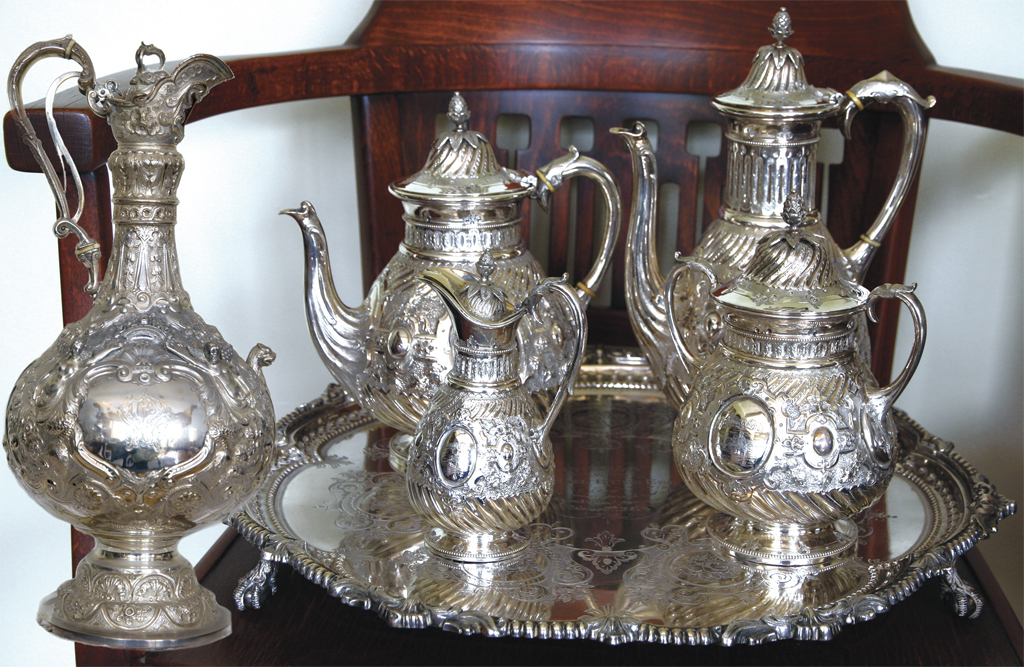
Sterling silver tea set presented to Rush in 1881 by his admirers.

=== The Rush Trophy ===
Following his defeat in the Walker Whiskey Trophy events, a number of Rush's admirers and backers held a banquet in his honour, at which they presented him with an illuminated testimonial along with a sterling silver tea set, salver, and claret jug, valued at £200. These recognised his excellence as a sportsman, and his admirable qualities as a man. The salver was inscribed with a dedication, and each piece bore an inscribed caricature of Rush at the oars of an outrigger skiff. The silver items are now in the collection of the Clarence River Historical Society in Grafton, New South Wales.

=== His last row ===
Business and family commitments kept Rush busy for the next few years. He moved his home up-river from Maclean to Grafton, the effective 'capital' of the Clarence River district. Rush purchased a hotel and an adjacent store, and a riverside villa which he named 'Clarence House'. Rush took an active part in a great many community and sporting organisations. He was a founder of the Grafton Rowing Club and was several times an office-holder of the Clarence River Jockey Club. He continued to promote and take part in local regattas. One of these was the Clarence River Aquatic Carnival, held on 10 March 1883. The Carnival attracted thousands of spectators. The main event was Rush vs Laycock for a stake of £1000 and the Championship of Australia, which Laycock won convincingly. At a banquet later that week, Rush announced his retirement from professional sculling, but in December of that year, he rowed Trickett on the Parramatta River for a stake of £400, and lost convincingly. The newspapers praised Rush for his valour, but hinted that it was high time he retired.

Rush organised an Aquatic Carnival at Grafton, held on 2 January 1888, as part of the national celebrations marking the centenary of European settlement in Australia. The event attracted many up-and-coming scullers, including future World Champion Henry Searle, and even Ned Hanlan, who declined to compete due to illness, though he gave an exhibition of 'trick' sculling. (Note: Rush suggested a Searle vs Hanlan match, to which Hanlan is alleged to have replied 'I'm not having any Searle in mine'. "SCULLING". The Sydney Morning Herald. 18 July 1923. p. 17.) Rush rowed his last professional match on this occasion, as a member of a pair-oar crew.

== Later life and career ==
Rush remained interested and involved in the sport of sculling. He was in demand as a race official, for example, as an umpire or timekeeper, though he did little coaching.

In 1893, Rush moved his family to Sydney. The Banks Crash reduced many Australian businessmen to ruin, Rush included. His business was built on credit alone: Rush did not even own the Grafton house where he and his family lived, having mortgaged it from the man who sold it to him. He borrowed from local banks, using his store-keeping business as security. In Sydney, Rush took a lease on the York Hotel, at the corner of King and York Streets, which quickly became known as 'Mick Rush's Hotel', a popular venue for meetings of sportsmen. During the next decade, Rush kept several hotels in the city of Sydney, and operated also as a hotel broker.

Rush organised two major Sydney sculling events, held on the Parramatta River. The first was in August 1906 which included a Veterans' Race, and a Ladies' Double Sculling Championship. The Veterans' Race included many old sculling champions, with the exception of Trickett who had retired from sporting activity. In 1907, Rush organised an even more ambitious event, 'Rush's Rowing Carnival', held in February 1907. with a Veteran's Event, and an 'All Comers' Handicap' offering a prize of £50. Rush hoped to 'resuscitate an interest in rowing.' The Carnival attracted several promising scullers, including future champions Richard Arnst and Peter Kemp, but spectator attendance was 'very small'. Rush's last recorded participation in a major sculling event was as umpire of the World Championship match between William Webb and Charles Towns held 3 August 1907, over the Parramatta course. (Note: George Towns had retired and forfeited his championship to his brother Charles. "ROWING". The Sydney Morning Herald. 18 May 1907. p. 17.)

== Appearance and character ==
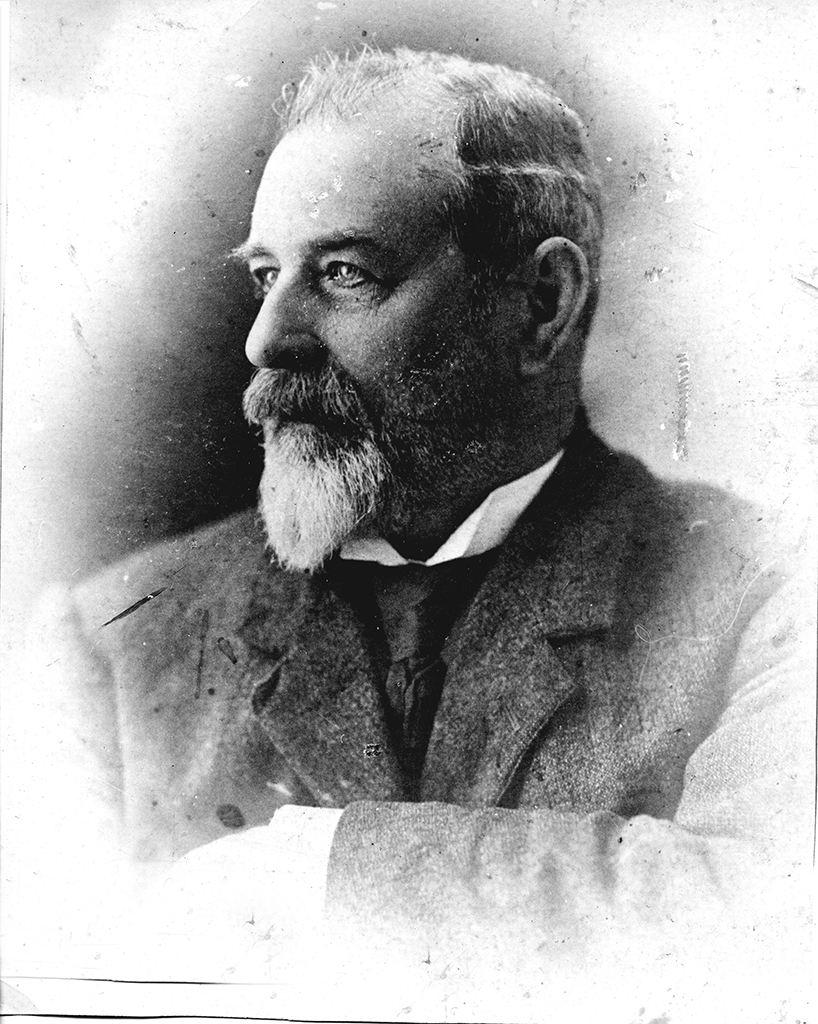
Rush in later life, ca. 1906.

Rush was a tall, well-built and powerful man. He was described many times in Australia's colonial press, his 'form' being of interest to sports fans. Journalists commented repeatedly on Rush's open and honest manner – 'the genial Mick Rush' – and his honourable conduct in the world of professional sculling, which earned a reputation for dishonesty. He possessed a strong social conscience, and was involved with many community and charitable projects. Some years after his death, a Grafton resident wrote, 'Mick Rush was the best-hearted Irishman who ever broke bread, and helped many a poor beggar irrespective of colour or creed, and may his descendants follow in his footsteps.'

== Personal life ==
Rush married Anne Aby (known as Annie) Fitzpatrick on 18 September 1865, at St Mary's Cathedral, Sydney. Annie Fitzpatrick, born 1846, was the daughter of Irish ex-convicts. She bore Rush fourteen children, three of whom died in infancy and two in early adulthood. None of Rush's children became professional sportsmen, though three of his sons competed successfully in various amateur sculling contests and one as a cyclist. His daughter Emily was a well-known amateur singer during her youth. Two Rush sons fought in the Boer War, another went gold-prospecting on the Kalgoorlie gold-fields, and died there. Rush retired around 1913, to a cottage and ten acres of land in Hurstville, New South Wales. He died there on 22 December 1922, after a brief illness. Rush was interred in Sydney's Waverley Cemetery.

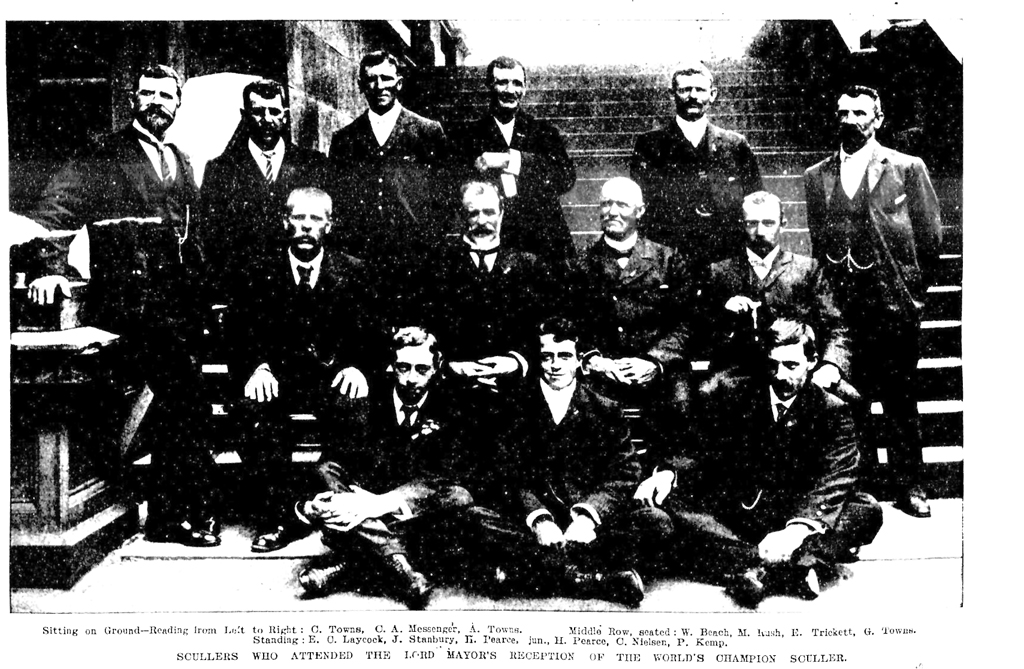
Gathering of Australian champion scullers, Sydney Town Hall, 1902. Rush is in the middle row, third from right. Sydney Mail 17 December 1902

== Books ==
- Bennett, Scott. 1973. The Clarence Comet : the career of Henry Searle, 1866–89. Sydney University Press. ISBN 0-424-06690-4
- ________. 1985 "Professional Sculling in New South Wales." Journal of the Royal Australian Historical Society Vol. 71.
- Gard, Stephen. 2011. Michael Rush : champion Australian sculler. Thirlmere, NSW : BlueDawe Books. ISBN 978-0-646-55987-2
- Kass, Terry. 2009. Grafton : Jacaranda city on the Clarence. A History. Grafton NSW : Clarence Valley Council. ISBN 978-0-9589805-5-5
- McSwan, E. H. 1976 edition. Discovery and Settlement of the Lower Clarence. Maclean District Historical Society.
- ________. 1992. Maclean : the first fifty years, 1862–1912. Maclean District Historical Society. ISBN 0-909323-12-7
- O’Farrell, Patrick. 2000. The Irish in Australia : from 1788 to the present. Notre Dame, Ind. : University of Notre Dame Press.
- Ripley, Stuart. 2009. Sculling and skulduggery : a history of professional sculling. Petersham, N.S.W. : Walla Walla Press.
- Stoddart, Brian. 1986. Saturday Afternoon Fever : sport in the Australian culture. North Ryde: Angus & Robertson. ISBN 978-0-207-15133-0
- Trickett, Gordon. H. 2001. Ned Trickett : champion sculler of the world. Lane Cove NSW, Lane Cove Library, Local Studies Monograph No. 17.

== Newspaper articles and journals ==
- Old Times: A unique illustrated history of the early days, dealing with every phase of life from the arrival of Governor Phillip, with many reminiscences of old colonists living and dead Vol1. # 4. July 1903. Sydney : Commercial Publishing Co. of Sydney Ltd.
- McFarlane, Duncan. "Rowing on the Clarence : Some Early History" Daily Examiner (Grafton NSW) Monday, 10 May 1920.
