= English Sculling Championship =

The English Sculling Championship developed out of informal competitions between working watermen on rivers such as the Thames and the Tyne. Various matches were made on a casual basis but in time these were more formalised. The first recognised Champion was Charles Campbell (rower) who beat John Williams in September 1831 on the Thames. Various persons then held the Championship which was gained under the challenge system. In June 1876 Edward Trickett of Australia won the Championship and then the Title became the World Sculling Championship See this entry for a list of Champions and races, and other details, from 1831 to 1876.

== English Championship ==
Trickett returned to Australia and apparently took the English title with him. There arose innumerable disputes as to who was the resident champion in England. To bring order out of chaos the proprietors of the “Daily Chronicle” offered a silver cup as an emblem for the English Championship and stated that it was first to be rowed for in an open regatta. The winner would then be subject to challenges under the usual challenge system. However any sculler who won it three times in succession could claim it as their personal property. This arrangement was fairly common in professional sport in those days. The regatta was held on the Tyne in March 1877 and the cup was won by Robert W. Boyd when he beat W. Nicholson of Stockton.

The following races were held subsequently.

- 28 May 1877 Boyd beat John Higgins on the Thames.
- 8 Oct 1877 Higgins beat Boyd, Thames.
- 14 Jan 1878 Higgins beat Boyd on a foul, on the Tyne.
- 3 June 1878 Higgins beat William Elliott, Thames.

Higgins thus became the permanent holder and owner of the cup. To encourage the sport the proprietors of the London “Sportsman” gave another cup to be raced for on similar conditions. The regatta was held on the Thames in September 1878 and in the final Elliott won on a foul against Boyd.

The following races were held subsequently.

- 16 Feb 1879 Elliott beat Higgins, Tyne.
- 16 June 1879 Ned Hanlan beat Elliott, Tyne.
- 15 Nov 1880 Hanlan beat Trickett, Thames. (This was also a World Championship Race.)
- 14 Feb 1881 Hanlan beat Elias C. Laycock. Thames. (This also was a World Championship Race.)
- 3 April 1882 Hanlan beat Boyd. Tyne. (Also a World Championship Race.)

At this point Hanlan was the owner of the Cup. He went on to race many World Title races and United States Championship races but it seems that he never defended his English Championship Title. Another “Sportsman Cup” was provided for by the company and this became the trophy which was raced for.

As Hanlan was Canadian the question arose again of who was, or should be, the English Champion. The next race was 20 June 1882 when J Largan of Wandsworth beat H Pearce of Sydney on the Thames.

- 26 May 1886, G J Perkins beat Australian Neil Matterson on the Thames. Matterson was also an unsuccessful contender for the World Title.
- 7 Feb 1887 George Bubear of Hammersmith beat Perkins on the Tyne.
- Bubear himself was beaten in the next race on the 13 Feb 1888 by Canadian Wallace Ross on the Thames.

From this point English sculling was at a low ebb with the centre of activity having gone to Australia and Sydney in particular.

Ross was induced to put his English Championship up for the following race. He did not defend his title.

- 9 September 1888 Henry Ernest Searle beat another Canadian William Joseph O'Connor on the Thames. This was also a World Title race. Searle died in 1889 and the next race was;
- 30 Nov 1891 when William East of Isleworth beat Perkins on the Tyne. Again he seems not to have defended it.
- 30 Jan 1893 G. Bubear beat George H. Hosmer of Boston USA, on the Thames.
- 25 Sept 1893 Tom Sullivan (rower) of New Zealand beat Bubear on the Thames.
- 16 Feb 1895 Englishman Charles R. Harding (Sullivan's trainer) beat Sullivan on the Tyne.
- On 9 September 1895 they had a re-match on the Championship Course on the Thames and again Harding won. His time was 22 minutes 59 seconds.
- In July 1896, Harding challenged the Australian Jim Stanbury for the World Sculling Championship Title. The race took place on the Thames but Stanbury defended his world title and won the wager of £500 a side. At stake was the English Title as well and this was won by Stanbury.
- 7 Sept 1896 Jacob Gaudaur, a Canadian beat Stanbury on the Thames. Gaudaur did not defend his title.
- 21 September 1898. W. A. Barry beat George Towns on the Championship Course (London,)

George Towns of Australia had gone to England in April 1897 with financial assistance from his supporters. In May 1899 won the Championship of England from W.A. Barry, a brother of Ernest Barry. The following year in September he defended his English title against a challenger from Australia, James Wray. Towns went on to win the World Championship but it was not until October 1908 that he defended his English Title. Towns travelled to England where he unsuccessfully defended his English Title on the Thames. He did not lose without a fight as his conqueror (Ernest Barry) had to row a record time over the course to win. The stakes were £400.
