= William East (rower) =

William (Bill) East
- Born: 2 February 1866; Lambeth (South London)
- Died: 10 December 1932
- Title: Professional Sculling Champion of England
- Term: 1891–1893
- Predecessor: Henry Ernest Searle
- Successor: George Bubear

William Giles East (1866–1932), was an English sculler.

== Biography ==
Legend says that he was born in his father’s boathouse at Putney, but he was actually born close to Lambert Pier in London. He spent his whole life on or by the Thames, and became a waterman's apprentice in 1882, which was the year he won the Putney Badge. In 1887, Bill won the Doggett's Coat and Badge Race, and in 1891, he won the English Sculling Championship. However he never defended this title. He also stroked in the winning Champion Fours in the National Regattas of 1890 and 1891, and also won the Champion Pairs.

Seven years later, in 1898, he was appointed a waterman to Queen Victoria. He retired from professional sculling about 1903/04. In June 1906, he became the Royal Bargemaster to King Edward VII.

Bill seems to have been a very popular person on the Thames and was early on connected to Cambridge University Boat Club, to train and coach the crews. In 1904, he published the ‘how-to’ book Rowing and Sculling.

Bill East coached Trinity Hall’s famous rower and sculler, the American Benjamin Hunting Howell to victories in the Wingfield Sculls in 1898 and 1899; the same years Howell also won the Diamond Challenge Sculls at Henley-on-Thames.

Like many other champion scullers he later in life became a publican. He ran the Prince’s Head hotel and then the Pigeon Hotel at Richmond.

Bill East died in December 1932.
