= John McLean (rower) =

Australian rower (1859–1925)

- Born: 17 September 1859 (1855); Shoalhaven, New South Wales
- Died: 22 January 1925 (aged 65) (1928, 73 years); Randwick, New South Wales
- Title: World champion sculler
- Term: 1890
- Predecessor: Peter Kemp (rower)
- Successor: Jim Stanbury

John McLean (17 September 1859 – January 22, 1925) (1855 to 1928) was one of seven Australians who each won the World Sculling Championship (Professional) between 1876 and 1957. He was born at Shoalhaven, New South Wales, on 17 September 1859 (1855).

== Early sculling ==
John McLean was a native of the Shoalhaven district, New South Wales, where he was born on 17 September 1859 (1855). Height, 6 ft ½ in (1.84 m); weight, 11 st, 10 lb (74.4 kg); and chest, 42 in (101 cm). He first appeared in a race on 17 March 1883, when he won an amateur light skiff race at Wardell, beating A. Phipps, D. Gollan, and others. On Easter Monday following he won the All-comers' Light Skiff Race at Swan Bay, beating J. Cook (15 lb), A. Campbell (10 lb), G. Busch (10 lb) and on 24 May, carrying 18 lb, he also won the All-comers' Race at Coraki, defeating A. Campbell (15 lb), W. Hart (28 lb), Tyler, and Hollingworth.

At Woodburn, on 9 November 1883, he rowed second to Campbell (10 lb), carrying 20 lb. The same day he won the Beaten Stakes, carrying 25 lb, his opponents being Hollingworth and McMahon. On 26 January 1884 he won the All-comers' Race at Broadwater with a 10 lb penalty, beating Campbell and Hollingworth. On 17 March he carried 35 lb, and beat Campbell, McDonald, and others in the All-comers' Race at Wardell the same day he also won the Farewell Handicap, carrying 60 lb, his opponents being A. Campbell (50 lb), Phipps (10 lb), Brown (feather). At Woodburn, on 9 November 1884, carrying 34 lb, he won the All-comers' Race, beating M. Wallace, Hart, Busch, Hann, and Robinson.

On 26 January 1885, carrying 45 lb, he beat M. Wallace (10 lb), W. Wilson (10 lb), M. McMahon (15 lb), J. Cook (20 lb), in the All-comers' Race at Broadwater. On 7 March he beat J. Cook in a match for £100. On Easter Monday he won the All-comers' Race at Swan Bay, carrying 30 lb, and beating Campbell and Wilson (feather). On 17 March, carrying 40 lb, he was beaten by J. Cook (18 lb), at Wardell. Next he won a handicap race at Coraki, beating M, Wallace. On 5 September he was beaten by G. Davis in a match for £100 at Woodburn. On 9 November he won the All-comers' Race at Woodburn, defeating Wallace, Purdy, and Wilson; the same day, carrying 50 lb, he was beaten by Wilson.

On 24 May 1886 he defeated G. Davis in the Champion Race at Woodburn. At the Grafton Carnival on 2 January 1888 he competed in the light skiff race won by Chris. Neilsen, and in the Beaten Stakes on the following day he was fourth, Ashwood being first. On 30 January and 22 September he defeated J. McKinnon, in matches for £100, at Woodburn. He also competed successfully in four out of five double-sculling races. At the Balmain Regatta, 9 November 1888, he finished third in the All-comers' Light Skiff Race, won by H. Messenger, with A. Cormack second, each carrying 15 lb.

On 5 January 1889 he easily defeated G. J. Perkins (ex-champion of England) in wager boats, for £150 a side, on the Parramatta river. He was next matched against Donald McDonald for £100 a side and the latter forfeited his deposit of £50. At the Grafton Regatta, on 24 May, he rowed second in the All-comers' Outrigger Race for a prize of £50, won by R. J. Brown, who received five lengths' start from McLean and D. McDonald. On 5 July he defeated Chris. Neilsen, for £200 a side, on the Parramatta river, but the latter was awarded the race on a foul. He beat C. Stephenson, later champion of New Zealand, on 30 October, for £100 a side, on the Parramatta river. In April 1890 he easily disposed of Neil Matterson over the Parramatta River Championship Course.

In early 1890 McLean was described as "the coming man" i.e. commentators believed he would win the Championship. By the time of the second Title attempt he had won twenty-two of his thirty-one single sculls races. He stood at about six feet tall and was a finely built man. In late March 1890 McLean raced Neil Matterson (who about a month later sculled and lost to Kemp for the World Title.) After the start McLean edged ahead and at the mile post was four lengths ahead. After this it was no contest and he was an easy winner.

== First attempt at the championship ==
Having beaten the lower ranked men his attention turned the top men of the day. He wanted to row one of Edward Hanlan, Peter Kemp, or Canadian William O’Connor. The challenge that was accepted was from Peter Kemp, the World Champion. The Title race took place on 15 May 1890 on the Parramatta River and the stake was £200 a side. The normal championship distance was three and a quarter miles. After the start a great race ensued to Uhr's Point and then Kemp took the lead. Despite a brilliant spurt by McLean he was unable to pass the leader who "won as he liked" by six lengths in a time of 23m.46s.

== World Champion ==
As a preliminary to the Championship he raced Jim Stanbury on 17 November 1890. No title was involved; it was a straight out money race at £200 a side. This was reasonably typical of professional rowing at the time. The race over the Parramatta course was easily won by McLean in 23m43.5s. It was stated that Stanbury was unwell.

John McLean believed he was good enough to be the World Champion and again challenged Kemp to a race. The date agreed to was 15 December 1890 and once again it was held on the Parramatta River with the stake set at £200 a side. Kemp got away better at the start and was soon had a lead of half a length. Both boats came close together and McLean fouled Kemp who stopped rowing for a couple of strokes. McLean took advantage of this and went half a length ahead. However Kemp soon got underway and spurted and was quickly ahead again. McLean then made an effort and slipped ahead. He sculled well and despite the best work of Kemp he was unable to overtake McLean who finished six lengths ahead in a time of 22m.13s. The referee decided the foul in McLean's favour.

== First defence ==
Champions did not have long to rest on their laurels and McLean was soon challenged for his Title by James (Jim) Stanbury, another Australian. The agreed date for the match was 28 April 1891 which was again to be held on the Parramatta River. The stake was the usual £200 a side. At the start Stanbury caught the water first and immediately forged ahead. After a mile he was three lengths in front and although McLean rowed for all he was worth he could not get level with the leader. Towards the finish Stanbury spurted and passed the judge an easy winner. His time was 22m.18s.

== Final title race ==
Often when one sculler was beaten by another he was offered a return match. This occurred between McLean and Stanbury and the re-match was set down for 7 July 1891 with almost the same terms and conditions as before. The Parramatta course was about 600 yards shorter than that for the previous match. From the start both boats were fairly even for the first mile or so. McLean then began to lose ground and gradually the Champion drew away from the challenger. Stanbury maintained his position and easily crossed the line some three lengths to the good in a time of 18m.25s.

== Personal life ==
John McLean was the son of Alexander McLean and Christina, née Lamond. He married Henrietta Tyler when he was 31 years old. They had five children. McLean died on 22 January 1925 at Randwick, (NSW) aged 65 years and was buried locally.

John McLean was buried at Randwick General Cemetery. Part of the inscription on his headstone reads, "died on 21st Jan 1928, aged 73 years". This means he was born in 1855.

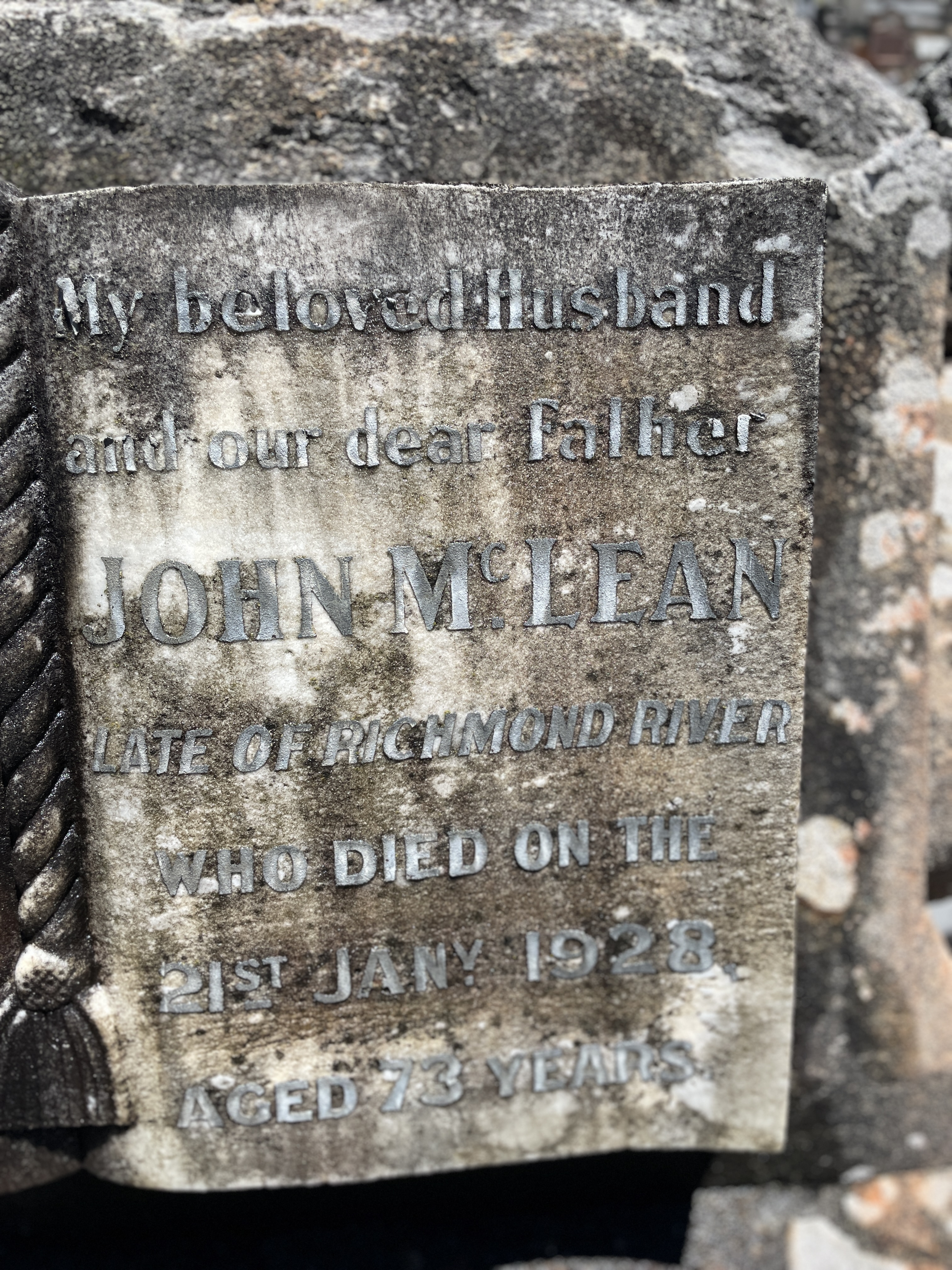
Headstone on John McLean's grave at Randwick General Cemetery.
