= Henry Searle =

Henry Searle may refer to:

- Henry Ernest Searle, Australian sculler
- Henry Searle (tennis), British tennis player
