= Neil Matterson (rower) =

Australian rower

Neil Matterson was an Australian professional sculler who attempted to win the World Sculling Championship, and although he was unsuccessful in that, he went on to coach Henry Ernest Searle who did become the World Champion.

== Early life and sculling ==
Neil Matterson was born at Kempsey, Macleay River, New South Wales on 6 June 1864. As an adult, he was 5 ft, 11 in (1.80 m) tall, and his training weight was about 10 st 12 lb (68.9 kg).

On 24 May 1882, he competed in the second-class All-comers' Light Skiff Race at the Grafton Regatta and finished last. On the same day, with G. Ashwood, he won the Double-sculling race; in July he beat J. Stuart over a course of two miles and a-half, in light skiffs, for £10 a side. He then defeated J. Parkinson for £50 a side, in July, over a course of three miles.

On 26 January 1884, with featherweight, he won the All-comers' Light Skiff Race at Rocky Mouth Regatta. Acting on the advice of Michael Rush, Matterson came to Sydney, and in April beat Nichols, of Shoalhaven, for £20 a side, in light skiffs, over the Parramatta championship course. He was matched against Guilliford for £50 a side, and the latter forfeited. On 22 May, at the Ned Hanlan-Elias C. Laycock exhibition match on the Nepean river, he won the All-comers' Light Skiff with 25 lb, defeating four others. On the same day he also won the Wager Boat Race (his maiden race in an outrigger) with 10sec start, defeating R. Edwards (of Victoria), H. Pearce (scratch), Charles A. Messenger (7sec), and Woods (20sec). He beat R. Edwards on 22 August in wager boats for £100 a side on the Parramatta River; on 18 October he beat Peter Kemp (rower) for £200 a side on the Nepean River, but Kemp gave up after rowing about a mile. On 5 November he defeated R. Edwards in the All-comers' Race at Albert Park Regatta (Victoria); he competed in the All-comers' Race at the Balmain Regatta on 9 November. The race had to be rowed over again, and was then won by Pearce, Messenger being second, and Matterson third.

On 29 May 1885 he beat Charles A. Messenger for £200 a side over the champion course was then matched to row Peter Kemp, but, being in ill health, forfeited his first deposit of £25.

== World championship match ==
Matterson had challenged Bill Beach for a match for the latter's World Title. The stake was for £200 a side and the match was held on the Parramatta river on 18 December 1885. The challenger was severely overmatched, and the race turned out to be little more than a training run for the champion, who won easily in a time of 24 minutes. See also World Sculling Championship.

== Later events ==
In February 1886, Matterson left Sydney for England, arriving there in April. On 24 May, he was beaten by George Perkins over the Thames Championship Course for £400 and the Sportsman Cup, which included the English Sculling Championship. On 7 June, on the Thames, he defeated Dave Godwin for £100 a side. On 16 August, he beat George Perkins for £200 a side. In the first round of the Great International Sculling Sweepstakes, held on the Thames on 30 and 31 August, and 1 September 1886, he defeated Wallace Ross, of Canada, but in the second round he was beaten by John Teemer (America); on 10 September, on the Thames, he was beaten by G. Lee for £200 a side. Matterson returned to Sydney on 3 December of the same year. He competed in the final heat of the Lake Bathurst Handicap Outrigger Race, won by Jim Stanbury, on 14 January 1887, but was not placed. On 4 July of the same year, he was beaten by Peter Kemp for £200 a side and the Tennyson Cup, over the championship course, Parramatta river. He did not again appear in a public contest until 26 September 1888, when he defeated Chris. Neilsen for £100 a side on the Parramatta river. On 29 October, he was beaten by Peter Kemp on the Parramatta river, the backers of the latter laying £1000 to £300. He was third in the final of the Brisbane Aquatic Carnival, rowed on 11 December, and won by Henry Ernest Searle, with Peter Kemp second.

== Champion coach ==
Matterson trained the latter champion sculler of the world, Henry Ernest Searle, for all his engagements on the Parramatta river. Searle won the Championship off Peter Kemp in October 1888. Searle travelled to England and while there he defeated William Joseph O'Connor for the World Sculling Championship, and Matterson defeated George Bubear (ex-champion of England) for £200 a side, over the Thames course, on 13 October 1889.

== A second world title attempt ==
Henry Searle famously died shortly afterwards in December 1889, and the Championship Title reverted to Peter Kemp. Matterson had felt that the Title should have been competed for by a round robin series or an elimination series, with him as one of the contestants. However, this did not eventuate, but he did manage to get in the first challenge. As Searle's trainer, he must have had a good idea of Kemp's abilities and felt he could beat him. The race was arranged for 25 April 1890 on the Parramatta and the stake was £200 a side. Both men were in top condition and a good race was expected. From the start, Kemp went ahead and stayed ahead until the finish. Matterson became so exhausted that Kemp easily came home several hundred yards in front. The time was 21m. 13.5s. Matterson did not again ever attempt to win the Championship.

== Later training success ==
Matterson also trained Charles Stephenson (rower) for the latter's race with William Hearn, for the New Zealand Sculling Championship of, which Stephenson won at Wellington in February 1890 and at the Dunedin Exhibition, on 17 February, won Champion Scullers' Race for £50. Matterson died in April 1933.
