= William Webb (rower) =

New Zealand professional rower (1880–1960)

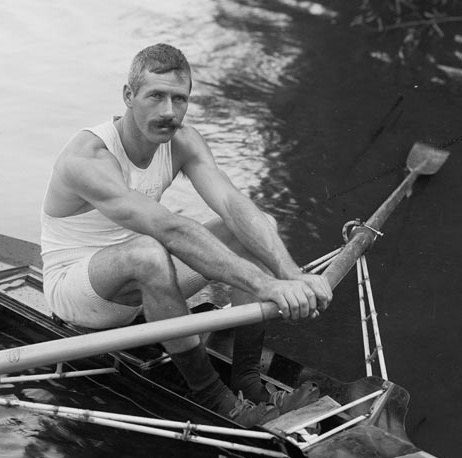
- William Webb rowing on the Whanganui River in 1907 (Photo by Frank J. Denton)
- Born: 1880; Lyttelton, New Zealand
- Died: 1960 (aged 79–80)
- Other name: Bill or Billy Webb
- Title: World champion sculler
- Term: 1907–1908
- Predecessor: George Towns (rower)
- Successor: Richard Arnst

William Charles Webb (21 January 1880 – 2 October 1960) was the first New Zealander to hold the professional World Sculling Championship title. He was also known as Bill or Billy Webb.

== Early life ==
Webb was born at Lyttelton, the port of Christchurch, New Zealand, on 21 January 1880 and was educated at Christchurch Boys' High School. In his youth he was a natural athlete being prominent in running and cycling but he turned his attention to rowing. He won various amateur events between 1896 and 1905/06, not only in single sculls but also in doubles and fours. In his last season as an amateur he won the Champion Single Sculls and the Champion Double Sculls events at Picton, and later the Senior Single Sculls at Wanganui, and thus became the amateur New Zealand champion. By this time Webb had moved to Wanganui to live and he spent the rest of his life there. After winning the amateur events he decided to turn professional.

== Professional sculling ==
=== New Zealand champion ===
His first professional race was for the New Zealand Sculling Championship against Jim Stanbury, an Australian who was five times World Champion from 1891 to 1896 and again from 1905 to mid 1906. The race was run on the Whanganui River on 26 December 1906, with a purse of £200 a side. Stanbury was nearing the end of his racing career and put up a good row, but was well beaten by Webb in a time of 18m.50s for the three mile course.

=== World champion ===
Webb then challenged Charles Towns of Australia, the World Title holder, to a match and £500 as a side stake. Towns had become the title holder after his brother, George Towns, had forfeited it to him; the Webb race was his first defence of the title. This race took place on the Parramatta River, Sydney, Australia, on 2 August 1907. Webb won by five lengths and was declared World Champion by the umpire, despite a protest by Towns regarding an alleged foul by Webb which would have lost him the race. Not all commentators agreed with the umpire; some thought Webb should have lost the race because of the foul. However, as there was no controlling body for the World Title, nor for most other professional sports, the ruling stood.

=== First defence ===
Webb returned home to New Zealand to a huge welcome. His first challenge came from Richard Tresidder, an Australian, and the usual £500 side stake was agreed to. This race was set down for 25 February 1908 on the Whanganui River over a distance of about three and a quarter miles. This was the first race ever held in New Zealand for the World Championship, and Webb crossed the line three lengths ahead: his time of 20m.28s made him undisputedly the champion of the world.

The 1908 World Title race was commemorated in December 2008 when Olympic champion Olaf Tufte defeated three-time World Champion Mahé Drysdale and wild card race winner Hamish Bond on the Whanganui River to take home the $5000 cash prize. The race as since been competed for annually under the title of "The Billy Webb Challenge."

=== Championship loss ===
Webb's next challenge came from fellow New Zealander Richard Arnst, with the stake at £500 a side (a sum representing several years' earnings by a working man at the time). The match was held on the Whanganui River on 15 December 1908, and Arnst won by eight or ten lengths. A rematch between Arnst and Webb was arranged for 22 June 1909 on the same course, and a fast time of 18m.15s was recorded by Arnst who again won, this time by two to three lengths.

Webb was involved in several smaller races after this but it was not until 26 December 1910 that his next major professional race took place. No title was involved but the stake was £200 a side. This race was held on the Whanganui River and was against the Australian Champion Harry Pearce. He was a formidable rower, having defeated a record five challenges in the previous year for his Australian Title. Pearce won the race by two lengths despite the best efforts of Webb. Pearce was later an unsuccessful challenger for the World Championship.

=== Later races ===
Webb's final professional race was for the Championship of New Zealand. He had previously been the holder of this title, but during his time as World Champion he had forfeited it to another rower, as he was unwilling to risk a loss for a lesser title. His opponent for this next race was another New Zealander, Pat Hannan. The race was run on the Whanganui River on 24 September 1915 and the stake was £200 a side. Webb was a comfortable winner this time. Hannan was later an unsuccessful challenger for the World Championship. The First World War precluded any further professional matches, and when the war was over Webb retired as the undefeated Professional New Zealand Single Sculls Champion.

== Later events ==
Throughout his life Webb continued to row for pleasure and also gave exhibition rows; he was always willing to help young rowers who sought his assistance. He was well remembered and well thought of in his home of Wanganui, where a street is named after him, and the "Billy Webb Challenge" rowing regatta is held annually. The 2016 Billy Webb challenge saw an epic showdown between Olympic champion Mahe Drysdale and silver medallist Croatian Damir Martin, which event manager Kate Austin described as "very exciting".

Webb died on 2 October 1960. He was inducted into the New Zealand Sports Hall of Fame in September 1997.
