= Jacob Gaudaur =

Canadian rower (1858–1937)

Jacob Gaudaur, Sr.
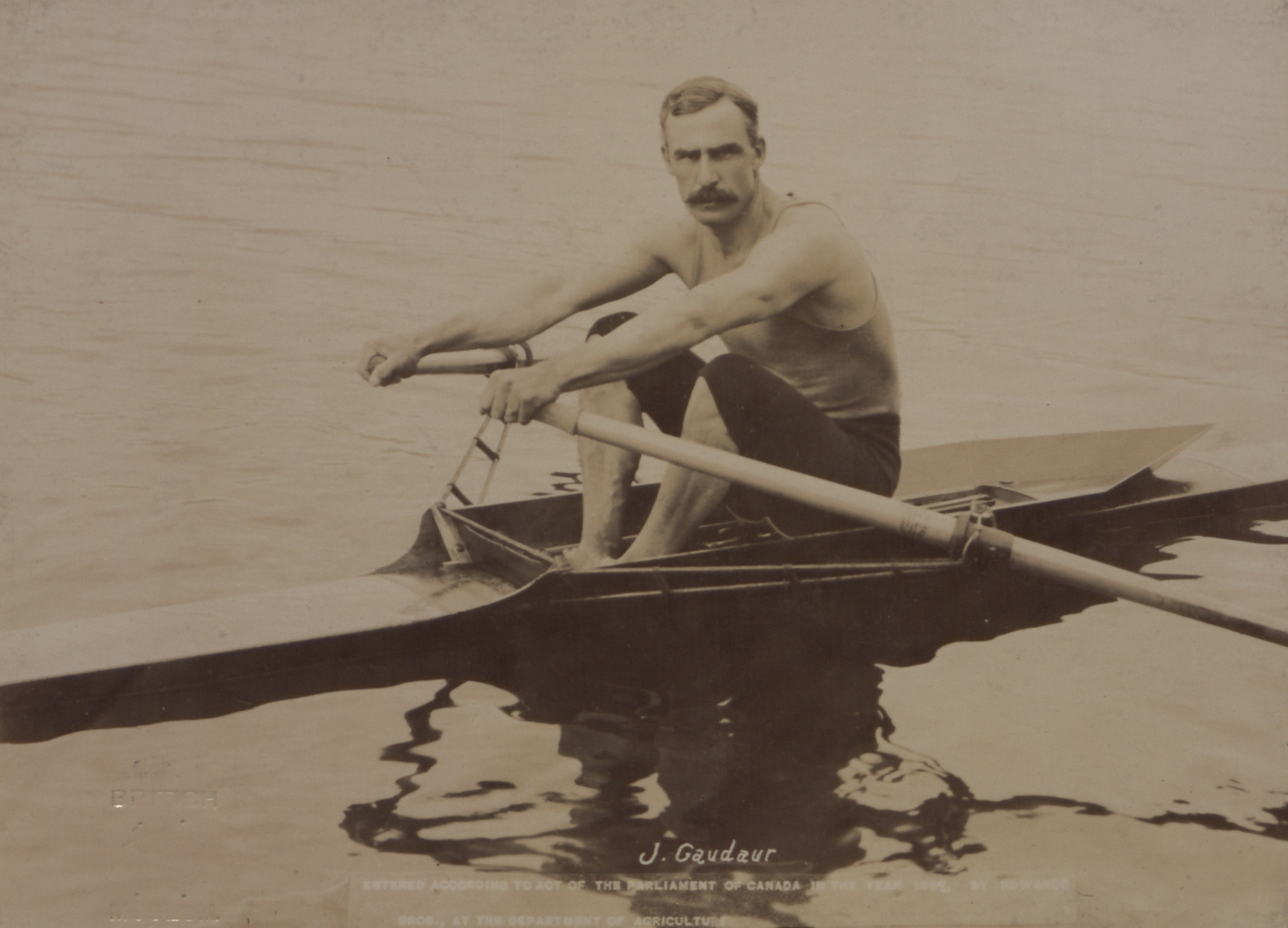
- Gaudaur in 1898
- Born: April 3, 1858; Orillia, Canada West
- Died: October 11, 1937 (aged 79)
- Other name: Jake Gaudaur
- Title: World champion sculler
- Term: 1896–1901
- Predecessor: Jim Stanbury
- Successor: George Towns

Jacob Gill Gaudaur, Sr. (April 3, 1858 – October 11, 1937) was one of two Canadians to win the Professional World Sculling Championship. Gaudaur was born in Orillia, Ontario. His first race was when he was aged 17 years and over his career he raced more than two hundred times. His professional career started in 1880.

== Pre-championship races ==
The summer of 1879 saw Gaudaur involved in several races in Ontario, including at Cobourg on Lake Ontario, and at Barrie on Lake Simcoe. At the inaugural Toronto Industrial Exhibition in 1879, Gaudaur won a match race against William McKen for CA$300 (equivalent to $11,381 in 2025).

Gaudaur won international fame when he beat Edward Trickett, the former World Champion, in England in 1881. He was trained by another former World Champion Ned Hanlan and on May 30, 1887, managed to beat him in a race at New York. In 1891 Jake came second in the Hop Bitters Race. In 1892 he teamed with George H. Hosmer to win the World Double Sculls Championship. The year of 1893 saw him win the three miles race for the American Single Sculls Championship in a record time of 19m.06s. After this he offered to row any person in the world for the American Championship or for any race between a quarter and three miles for a stake of between $1000 and $2500. The following year he reduced the record time to 19m.01.5s in the same event. When he won the Championship for a third time he was given permanent possession of the prize, the Richard K Fox Trophy. The convention of the times was that consecutive three-time winners in most sports kept the prize as their own property. After this Gaudaur was sometimes referred to in the press as "American" rather than "Canadian." The year 1885 was a most successful year for Gaudaur—of fifteen races he competed in he was only beaten in three.

In 1886, he challenged Bill Beach for the World Title. The match was run on September 18, 1886, on the Championship Course in England. This was one of the more interesting races for the Championship. The whole of the course was fringed with excited spectators several rows deep. The contestants went away fast and this exhausted Beach who stopped rowing and it seemed he was beaten. Gaudaur went ahead but Beach being cheered on by his supporters made another effort but did not catch his opposition. His coach then gave a strong encouragement to go on as he thought Gaudaur was just about "rowed out," which proved true. Gaudaur also stopped rowing and slumped in his boat for a short time before continuing. Despite another stop from exhaustion, Beach then managed to row on reasonably strongly to cross the line ahead of the challenger.

== World champion ==
In 1892, Gaudaur teamed with George Hosmer to win the world double sculls championship. In 1893, Gaudaur won the Championship of America in single sculls, finishing the 3 miles (4.8 km) race in a record time of 19:06. In 1894, Gaudaur beat the record with a time of 19:01.5. Gaudaur won the Championship of America for a third time in 1895. Gaudaur was given permanent possession of the championship's prize, the Richard K. Fox Trophy.

By 1896, Jim Stanbury was the single sculls current world champion. Stanbury had won the Title in Sydney in 1891 and had held off a couple of challenges in Australia in 1892. He travelled to North America and had hoped to meet Gaudaur for a match but terms could not be agreed on, so he returned home. Later he headed to England where he defeated Charles R. Harding on the Thames. After this it was arranged that Gaudaur would finally row Stanbury for the Title. It would have been easier for Gaudaur to travel to England rather than Australia for a match as normally the challenger travelled to where the Champion resided. The race was set down for the September 7, 1896, and was to be raced on the Thames, on the famous Championship Course (Putney to Mortlake.) The stake was for the extraordinary sum of £1000 a side. Gaudaur's physical details were given at this time as; height 6 ft (1.8 m), weight 12.5 st (79 kg), chest 41 in (100 cm), or more. He was said to have a powerful body and well-developed limbs.

The weather was dull and a slight breeze was blowing. Thousands of people lined the banks of the river to witness the event and great enthusiasm was displayed. Stanbury won the toss and chose the Surrey side and after twelve false starts the men got away. For a half mile the boats were level but a short time later Gaudaur was almost clear ahead. At the mile post, reached in 4m.52s, he had a whole length advantage. At Hammersmith Bridge Stanbury made a desperate effort to catch the Canadian and nearly did so but a foul occurred. Stanbury believed he had been fouled by Gaudaur and stopped rowing at speed assuming that he had won the race on the foul. Gaudaur continued on and crossed the line some twenty lengths ahead. The Champion's claim to the alleged foul was disallowed by the umpire and thus Jake Gaudaur was declared World Champion. Stanbury was severely criticized for not completing the race at speed and the question of who was the better sculler was not clearly settled. The winner's time was 23m.01s for the four and a quarter mile course. The race also doubled as the English Sculling Championship as the Sportsman Challenge Cup was also at stake. National titles were not always held by residents of the country. It appears Gaudaur never defended that title. When Gaudaur returned home to Orillia he was given a parade and reception, complete with fireworks, and the Mayor presented him with a purse containing CA$500 (equivalent to $24,515 in 2025) in gold.

== Defending the title ==
In July 1897, an Australian, James Wray, offered to row Gaudaur for the Championship and £500 a side. As the proposed race was to be on the Thames, Gaudaur thought this to be far too low and suggested $2000 a side plus $500 expenses. However he was prepared to let Wray have similar expenses if the match was to be in Canada. Negotiations stalled and no race took place. Over the five years Gaudaur held the Title he never seemed to be very keen to defend it.

A challenge came from fellow Canadian, Robert M Johnston. The stake was to total $2500 and the race was to be sculled on Vancouver Harbour on July 4, 1898. This was the first Championship race to be held in Canada. (Hanlan had rowed all his twelve races out of Canada.) There were three unusual features to this Title race. One, that it was on a harbour – most such races occurred on rivers. Secondly, the course was three miles and with a 180 degree turn in the middle. Normally races were on a straightaway, or at least in one direction on a river. The 'out and return' type of race was common in North America. Thirdly, the race was started by a starter rather than by mutual consent.

At the gun Gaudaur got away first and was soon a length ahead. He continued to increase his lead and at the mile point was five lengths clear. However, in turning at the buoy Johnston steered better and gained three lengths. Gaudaur then went ahead again and despite a good final spurt by Johnston, the Champion crossed the line about four lengths ahead. The time was 20m.25.8s.

Another strange feature of this race is that despite good evidence to the contrary it is seldom listed in records of the Championship races. For example, the British Rowing Almanac of 1930 does not mention it although all other races are listed. Perhaps the race was overlooked and the error perpetuated as lists were copied from one publication to another.

== Final championship race ==
In November 1899 Gaudaur expressed a wish to retire. He apparently declined to row George Towns of Australia who had offered to row anyone in the world, but Gaudaur preferred, for up to £1000 on the Thames. Gaudaur proposed handing the Title to another Canadian. He must have thought better of it and then accepted a proper challenge for the Title from Towns. The match was agreed to be sculled on September 7, 1901, and it was to take place at Lake of the Woods, Ontario. This was the first time a Championship race took place on a lake. The next was in 1933.

Thousands of spectators witnessed the race. The water was calm and he weather favourable. Gaudaur had the inside and better position but it was not to help him. Towns shot ahead at the start but the Champion was soon on even terms. However Towns was the stronger of the two and then went ahead to cross the line by four lengths. The time was 20m.30s, a slower time than normal.

== Later life ==
After retiring from sculling, Gaudaur became a popular and much sought-after fishing guide. He had expert knowledge of Lake Simcoe.

Gaudaur died on October 11, 1937, at Orillia. He was inducted into Canada's Sports Hall of Fame in 1956, and into the Orillia Hall of Fame in 1966. Gaudaur was the father of another Jake Gaudaur—a well-known Canadian football player and Canadian Football League Commissioner. Jacob's father Frank was also a sculler.

A bridge at the Narrows, near where his home was, is called the Jake Gaudaur Bridge. Also a Historical Plaque was erected in 1960 in his memory. It is now in Centennial Park. A road in Vaughan, Ontario, Gaudaur Road, is named after him. This road runs off Hanlan Road.
