= World Sculling Championship =

Rowing award (1863–1957)

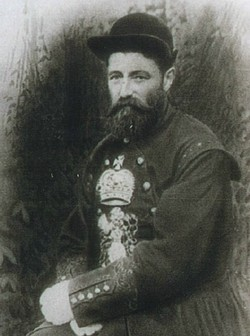
James Arthur Messenger, Champion of the World in 1854. He was also bargemaster for Queen Victoria until 1901.

The World Sculling Championship (1863–1957), evolved from the Championship of the Thames for professional scullers.

Only the sport of boxing claims an older Championship of the World. It is notable that Jack Broughton, the "Father of Boxing", trained scullers for prize contests which had their roots in wager races which had taken place from the middle of the 18th century on the Thames.

== History ==
The first race for the Professional Championship of the Thames took place between Westminster and Hammersmith, on the River Thames in London in September 1831, when John Williams of Waterloo Bridge challenged Charles Campbell of Westminster for the Sculling Championship of the Thames. This was just over a year after the first Wingfield Sculls race for the Amateur Championship of the Thames had been held.

The race was initially dominated by oarsmen from the Thames, but a fierce rivalry soon arose between Newcastle and London after the famous Tyne sculler, Robert Chambers became the first non-Londoner to secure the title in 1859.

In 1863 the race became for the Championship of the World. when it had its first non-British entrant, Australian Richard A W Green. Green lost to Chambers but changes were afoot and as an increasing number of professional scullers from Australia; the US and Canada started to compete, Britain lost its dominance, failing to secure a win between 1876 and 1920. For details of the subsequent English Championship only see English Sculling Championship.

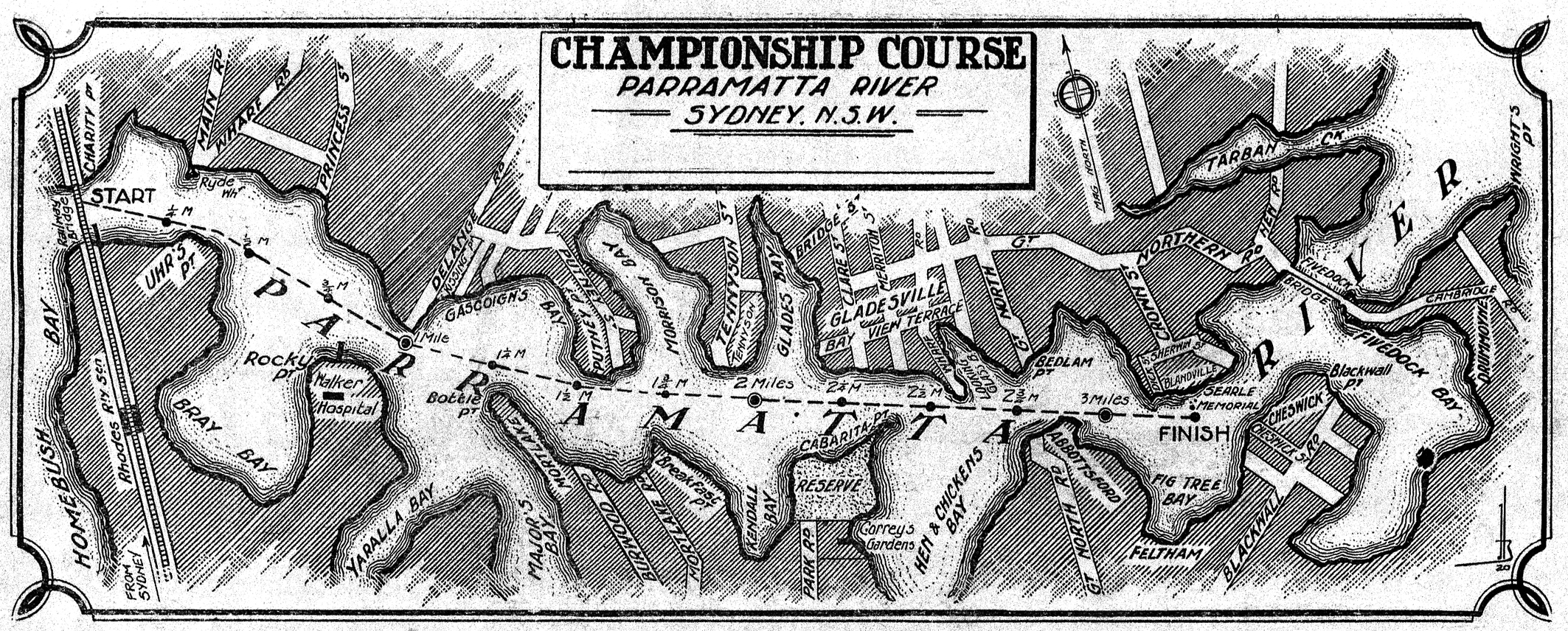
Championship Sculling Course Parramatta River Sydney NSW Australia 1920

The first overseas sculler to claim the title, was Australian Edward Trickett, who won his first race in June 1876, Trickett held the title for the next two races (1877 and 1879), both of which were held on his home river, the Parramatta. Trickett eventually lost out to Canadian Ned Hanlan (the first sculler to use a boat with a sliding seat), in 1880 on the Championship Course on the Thames. This course was over a distance of a little over four miles but for other races on other courses there was no set distance. These other courses varied between three and five miles approximately.

Professional sculling saw a marked downturn with each of the world wars. Although a few races were held after the 2nd World War, they failed to arouse the interest of the public or attract the standard of competitor seen in the earlier years of the Championship, and as the amateur / professional split in rowing was slowly abolished, the race died out. The Title lapsed in 1958 when Evans Fischer retired undefeated.

The 1908 World Title race was commemorated in December 2008 when Olympic champion Olaf Tufte defeated three time World Champion Mahé Drysdale and wild card race winner Hamish Bond on New Zealand's Whanganui River to take home the $5000 cash prize.

== Challenges ==
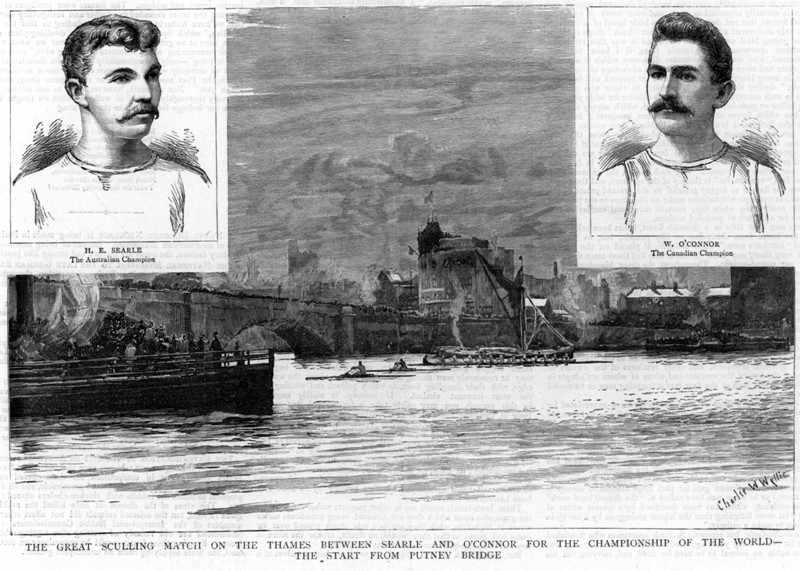
Engraving printed in the Illustrated London News in September 1889 for the match between Henry Ernest Searle (left) of Australia and William Joseph O'Connor (right) of Canada

A person wanting to become the champion would issue a formal challenge to the existing Champion for a match and would offer a certain sum of money. Sometimes a person would issue a newspaper challenge to the winner of another match and deposit a sum with the paper which would theoretically 'bind' the subsequent match. The stake was not a fixed amount but it had to be high enough to be worth the champion's time and reputation and which would discourage frivolous challenges. Typically the stake would be £100 or £200 a side for a state or national championship and £500 or more each for the world title. Sometimes additional expenses were expected as well. Under the rules such as they were, the Champion would have three months to accept the challenge or else forfeit the match in favour of the challenger.

The challenger and Champion, or their agents, discussed the 'terms' and came to an agreement. Sometimes challenges failed at this stage as there was no agreement or the challenger was unable to raise the money. Once the challenge was accepted the 'articles' would be drawn up and signed by the contestants and witnessed. The articles would state where and when the match was to be held, who the umpire was to be, how much the stake per side was to be and when it was to be paid in, and who the literal stake-holder was to be, and a few other details. From time to time it was agreed that the loser would receive some money as expenses which at least prevented a total loss. The stake-holder was often the Editor of a newspaper. The race was then supposed to run within another six months.

Seldom did challengers or Champions have to put up their own money in these sorts of competitions. The normal arrangement was that wealthy backers would put up the money. The backers were usually syndicates of gambling men. The backers of the winner of the match got their money back, and collected any other bets placed, but the winning man personally got the money put up from the backers of the loser. Side-bets between the actual contestants themselves were not unknown. Contestants were also often rewarded by splitting the 'gate.' i.e. the profit from sales of boat tickets and souvenirs. The nature of sculling meant that not all spectators could be charged to see the race but a split of sixty-forty to the winner was common.

== Betting ==
Professional scullers tended to attract more media attention than the crews, since their individuality gave the media and public a greater chance of recognition. "The Aquatic Oracle" published in London in 1852 lists hundreds and hundreds of professional races from 1835 to 1851 between watermen. While many were for small sums of money it gives an indication of the extent of the activity. Betting on races was widespread and in the late 19th century, sculling or wager racing was perhaps the greatest spectator sport in London at the time. Many tens of thousands of spectators attended each race. By the turn of the century prize money had become so great that some scullers made up to nearly £5,000 a year in prizes and side bets, and £2,000 for a race.

Betting was simplified by recourse to past performances and present form would be followed by hordes of spectators at training sessions.

== Boats ==
The very earliest races were informal events between working watermen who raced in their everyday work boat or wherry. These rowing boats were used to carry passengers and goods from one part of the river to another. As racing became more formalised the work boats were superseded by specialist racing craft. Several technical developments assisted in this transformation from the job of waterman to the sport of rowing. These were;

(1) the development of lightweight boats built solely for racing.

(2) the outrigger which placed the oar's pivot point outside the boat allowing for more leverage.

(3) the swivelling rowlock, and

(4) the sliding seat which also allowed for more oar movement.

These developments greatly increased the average speed of racing. Generally in contemporary reports these types of boats were referred to as "outriggers," "best and best," or "wager boats."

== Fouls ==
A foul is the touching of any part of an opponent's boat or sculls by any part of your own boat or sculls. In the early days of professional rowing, fouling an opponent was an accepted part of the game as a contestant would often deliberately foul to gain an advantage. As racing boats became lighter and frailer this practise became less and less accepted and was finally done away with as actual rowing skill was counted as more important than disabling the opposition. Later title or money matches outlawed fouling and generally the man doing the fouling lost the match. However, because contestants faced the opposite way to the way the boat travelled, accidental fouls sometimes occurred particularly as races were often held on rivers that had bends in them. No lanes were marked out as in modern courses and in a close race a foul could happen as both men tried to get around the bend as quickly as possible. It was not unknown for a contestant to engineer a foul against himself to thereby try to win the race. In most matches an umpire or referee would rule on these sorts of fouls as to whose fault it was, usually at the time, but sometimes only after the race had finished. From time to time he would decide that the foul was accidental with no advantage to either sculler, and would order the men to continue racing. Many races were decided on fouls rather than who was the better sculler and many men felt hard done by when the decision went against them. The umpire's decision was final.

== Results ==
Year	Date	Champion	Beat	Time	Course
1831	9 Sep	Charles Campbell	John Williams	NTT	Thames (Westminster to Hammersmith)
1838	1 Nov	Charles Campbell	Robert Coombes	42 mins	Thames (Westminster to Putney)
1846	19 Aug	Robert Coombes	Charles Campbell	26 mins 15secs	Thames (Putney to Mortlake)
1847	19 Sep	Robert Coombes	Robert Newell	23 mins 46 sec	Thames (Putney to Mortlake)
1851	7 May	Robert Coombes	Thomas J. MacKinney	27 mins 30 secs	Thames (Putney to Mortlake)
1852	24 May	Tom Cole	Robert Coombes	25 mins 15 secs	Thames (Putney to Mortlake)
1852	14 Oct	Tom Cole	Robert Coombes	23 mins 35 secs	Thames (Putney to Mortlake)
1854	20 Nov	James Messenger	Tom Cole	24 mins 45 secs	Thames (Putney to Mortlake)
1857	12 May	Harry Kelley	James Messenger	24 mins 30 secs	Thames (Putney to Mortlake)
1859	20 Sep	Robert Chambers	Harry Kelley	25 mins 25 sec	Thames (Putney to Mortlake)
1860	18 Sep	Robert Chambers	Tom White	23 mins 25 sec	Thames (Putney to Mortlake)
1863	14 Apr	Robert Chambers	George W. Everson	25 mins 27 sec	Thames (Putney to Mortlake)
1863	16 Jun	Robert Chambers	Richard A. W. Green	25 mins 35 secs	Thames (Putney to Mortlake)
1865	8 Aug	Harry Kelley	Robert Chambers	23 mins 23 secs	Thames (Putney to Mortlake)
1866	4 Jul	Harry Kelley	James Hammill	32 mins 45 secs	Tyne
1866	22 Nov	Robert Chambers	Joseph Sadler	25 mins 4 secs	Thames (Putney to Mortlake)
1868	6 May	Harry Kelley	Robert Chambers	31 mins 47 secs	Tyne
1868	17 Nov	James Renforth	Harry Kelley	23 mins 15secs	Thames (Putney to Mortlake)
1874	16 Apr	Joseph Sadler	Robert Bagnall	24 mins 15 secs	Thames (Putney to Mortlake)
1875	15 Nov	Joseph Sadler	Robert W. Boyd	28 mins 5 secs	Thames (Putney to Mortlake)
1876	27 Jun	Edward Trickett	Joseph Sadler	24 mins 35 secs	Thames (Putney to Mortlake)
1877	30 Jun	Edward Trickett	Michael Rush	23 mins 27secs	Parramatta, Sydney
1879	29 Aug	Edward Trickett	Elias C. Laycock	23 mins 29 secs	Parramatta, Sydney
1880	15 Nov	Edward Hanlan	Edward Trickett	26 mins 12 secs	Thames (Putney to Mortlake)
1881	14 Feb	Edward Hanlan	Elias C. Laycock	25 mins 49 secs	Thames (Putney to Mortlake)
1882	3 Apr	Edward Hanlan	Robert W. Boyd	21 mins 25 secs	Tyne
1882	1 May	Edward Hanlan	Edward Trickett	28 mins	Thames (Putney to Mortlake)
1883	30 May	Edward Hanlan	John A. Kennedy	19 min 4 sec	Point of Pines, Boston USA
1883	18 July	Edward Hanlan	Wallace Ross	27 min 57.5 secs	Odensberg, New York, USA
1884	22 May	Edward Hanlan	Elias C. Laycock	22 mins 46 secs	Nepean, Sydney
1884	16 Aug	Bill Beach	Edward Hanlan	20 mins 28 secs	Parramatta, Sydney
1885	28 Feb	Bill Beach	Thomas Clifford	26 mins 1 sec	Parramatta, Sydney
1885	28 Mar	Bill Beach	Edward Hanlan	22 mins 51 secs	Parramatta, Sydney
1885	18 Dec	Bill Beach	Neil Matterson	24 mins 11 sec	Parramatta, Sydney
1886	18 Sep	Bill Beach	Jake Gaudaur Sr.	22 mins 29 sec	Thames (Putney to Mortlake)
1886	25 Sep	Bill Beach	Wallace Ross	23 min 5 sec	Thames (Putney to Mortlake)
1887	26 Nov	Bill Beach	Edward Hanlan	19 mins 25 sec	Nepean, Sydney
1888	11 Feb	Peter Kemp	Thomas Clifford	23 mins 27secs	Parramatta, Sydney
1888	5 May	Peter Kemp	Edward Hanlan	21 mins 36 sec	Parramatta, Sydney
1888	28 Sep	Peter Kemp	Edward Hanlan	21 mins 25 secs	Parramatta, Sydney
1888	27 Oct	Henry Ernest Searle	Peter Kemp	22 mins 44 secs	Parramatta, Sydney
1889	9 Sep	Henry Ernest Searle	William Joseph O'Connor	22 mins 42 sec	Thames (Putney to Mortlake)
1890	25 Apr	Peter Kemp	Neil Matterson	21 mins 13 sec	Parramatta, Sydney
1890	15 May	Peter Kemp	John McLean	21 mins 45 sec	Parramatta, Sydney
1890	15 Dec	John McLean	Peter Kemp	22 mins 13 secs	Parramatta, Sydney
1891	28 Apr	Jim Stanbury	John McLean	22 mins 15 secs	Parramatta, Sydney
1891	7 Jul	Jim Stanbury	John McLean	18 mins 25 secs	Parramatta, Sydney (short Course)
1892	2 May	Jim Stanbury	Tom Sullivan	17 mins 26 secs	Parramatta, Sydney (short Course)
1896	13 Jul	Jim Stanbury	Charles R. Harding	21 mins 51 secs	Thames (Putney to Mortlake)
1896	7 Sep	Jake Gaudaur, Sr.	Jim Stanbury	23 mins 1 sec	Thames (Putney to Mortlake)
1898	4 Jul	Jake Gaudaur, Sr.	Robert Johnston	20 mins 25 sec	Vancouver Harbour
1901	7 Sep	George Towns	Jake Gaudaur, Sr.	20 mins 30 sec	Lake of the Woods, Ontario
1904	30 Jul	George Towns	Richard Tresidder	21 mins 28 sec	Parramatta, Sydney
1905	22 Jul	Jim Stanbury	George Towns	19 mins 4 sec	Parramatta, Sydney
1906	28 Jul	George Towns	Jim Stanbury	19 mins 53 sec	Parramatta, Sydney
1907	2 Mar	George Towns	Edward Durnan	22 mins 27 secs	Nepean, Sydney
1907	3 Aug	William Webb	Charles Towns	20 mins 35 secs	Parramatta, Sydney
1908	25 Feb	William Webb	Richard Tresidder	20 mins 28 secs	Wanganui, New Zealand
1908	15 Dec	Richard Arnst	William Webb	19 mins 51 secs	Wanganui, New Zealand
1909	21 Jun	Richard Arnst	William Webb	18 mins 15 secs	Wanganui, New Zealand
1910	4 Apr	Richard Arnst	George Whelch	21 mins 51 secs	Akaroa Harbour, New Zealand
1910	18 Aug	Richard Arnst	Ernest Barry	20 mins 14 secs	Zambezi River, Northern Rhodesia
1911	29 Jul	Richard Arnst	Harry Pearce	19 mins 46 secs	Parramatta, Sydney
1912	29 Jul	Ernest Barry	Richard Arnst	23 mins 8 secs	Thames (Putney to Mortlake)
1912	14 Oct	Ernest Barry	Edward Durnan	22 mins 31 secs	Thames (Putney to Mortlake)
1913	21 Jul	Ernest Barry	Harry Pearce	24 mins 9 secs	Thames (Putney to Mortlake)
1914	7 Sep	Ernest Barry	Jim Paddon	21 mins 28 sec	Thames (Putney to Mortlake)
1919	27 Oct	Alf Felton	Ernest Barry	25 mins 40 secs	Thames (Putney to Mortlake)
1920	31 Aug	Ernest Barry	Alf Felton	24 mins 32 sec	Parramatta, Sydney
1921	11 Jun	Richard Arnst	Pat Hannan	22 mins 34 sec	Wairau, New Zealand
1922	5 Jan	Darcy Hadfield	Richard Arnst	19 mins 46 secs	Wanganui, New Zealand
1922	18 Apr	Jim Paddon	Darcy Hadfield	19 mins 19 secs	Wanganui, New Zealand
1923	21 Jul	Jim Paddon	Darcy Hadfield	19 mins 46 secs	Richmond
1924	12 Aug	Jim Paddon	Alf Felton	17 mins 55 secs	Brisbane
1924	20 Sep	Jim Paddon	Major Goodsell	17 mins 7 secs	Richmond
1925	21 Mar	Major Goodsell	Bill McDevitt	22 mins 20 secs	Clarence
1925	27 Jun	Major Goodsell	Pat Hannan	21 mins 31 secs	Parramatta, Sydney
1925	7 Nov	Major Goodsell	Jim Paddon	22 mins 50 secs	Parramatta, Sydney
1926	3 May	Major Goodsell	Tom Saul	23 mins 11 sec	Parramatta, Sydney
1927	5 Sep	Major Goodsell	Bert Barry	24 mins 13 secs	Burrand Inlet, Vancouver
1927	6 Dec	Bert Barry	Major Goodsell	21 mins 40 secs	Burrand Inlet, Vancouver
1930	31 May	Ted Phelps	Bert Barry	22 mins 45 secs	Thames (Putney to Mortlake)
1930	11 Oct	Ted Phelps	Bert Barry	22 mins 48 secs	Thames (Putney to Mortlake)
1932	5 Sep	Ted Phelps	Major Goodsell	17 mins 2 secs	Long Beach, California
1933	1 Sep	Bobby Pearce	Ted Phelps	19 mins 26 secs	Lake Ontario
1934	5 Sep	Bobby Pearce	W. G. Miller	19 mins 52 secs	Toronto
1938	9 Sep	Bobby Pearce	Evans Paddon	20 mins 35 secs	Toronto
1948	20 Nov	Evans Paddon	Max Fisher	17 mins 20 secs	Parramatta, Sydney
1949	7 May	George Cook	Evans Paddon	15 mins 09 secs	Evans River
1950	22 April	Evans Paddon	George Cook	21 mins 58 secs	Evans River
1952	5 April	Jim Saul	Evans Paddon	20 min 33 secs	Richmond River
1952	Sept 13th	Evans Paddon	Jim Saul	21 min 50 secs	Richmond River
1953	13 June	Evans Fischer	Evans Paddon	20 min 55 secs	Richmond River
1954	7 Aug	Evans Fischer	Evans Paddon	20 min 57 secs	Clarence River
1957	25 May	Evans Fischer	Evans Paddon	20 min 46 secs	Clarence River

Notes:

1. Bill Beach, Bobby Pearce and Evans Fischer all retired undefeated.
2. James Renforth died while champion. Sadler later rowed for an open title.
3. Peter Kemp gained the title twice other than by races; once by formal forfeit from Beach, once upon the death of H Searle.
4. Richard Arnst gained the title once other than by a race; on the forfeiture of E Barry.
5. Charles Towns ad Bill McDevitt both held the title by the forfeiture of George Towns and Jim Paddon respectively. Neither successfully defended it.
6. R Chambers & E Paddon either gained the title once each by forfeit, or alternatively, one of their races was for an open title after the retirement of the holder.
