= Peter Kemp (rower) =

Australian rower (1853–1921)

- Born: 15 November 1853; Hawkesbury River, New South Wales
- Died: 1 December 1921 (aged 68); Summer Hill, New South Wales
- Title: World champion sculler
- Term: 1888 and 1890
- Predecessor: Bill Beach and Henry Ernest Searle
- Successor: Henry Ernest Searle and John McLean (rower)

Peter Kemp (1853-1921) was one of seven Australians who each won the World Sculling Championship (Professional) between 1876 and 1905.

He was born on the banks of the Hawkesbury River near Windsor, New South Wales, on 15 November 1853. As a boy growing up he taught himself to row. In 1873 he and his brother Thomas won a double sculls race of four miles in a time of thirty-three minutes.

== Early racing ==
His first race of note was when he won a skiff race at the Sackville Beach Regatta on the Hawkesbury River on 24 May 1881. He won this particular race four years in succession. In 1883 he won a professional match race at £10 a side by winning a light skiffs event at Sackville. The following year at the same location he rowed George Solomon for £50 a side in light skiffs over three miles and won. His next major race was in October 1884 over three and a quarter miles and for £200 a side against Neil Matterson, a man Kemp, and Bill Beach, were later to row for the World Title. The race was run in "best boats" i.e. lightweight racing craft. This was Kemp's first race in such boats but he managed to lead for the first half of the race. At this point he became so distressed that he had to stop rowing and thus lost the race.

Over the next two years he won a number of smaller races and handicap events and collected some useful prize money. In 1886, he travelled to England with Bill Beach who twice defended his World Title there. Kemp had no great success in England and returned to Australia where he continued to have wins in some of the local regattas and small match races. It was around this time that Kemp went into an intensive regime to improve his rowing. In 1887 he again meet Matterson on the Parramatta River and won with little effort.

== World Champion ==
Kemp was something of a protégée of Beach or at least a training partner. After Beach had won the World Title (1884) and successfully defended an unprecedented six challenges he decided to retire in late 1887 as undefeated champion and announced he was handing the Title to Kemp. It would appear that Beach had arranged for Kemp to challenge for the Title and under the rules then in place declined to accept the challenge within the regulation three months thereby forfeiting the Title. There was no controlling body for the Title (nor for most professional sport titles of the time) so the arrangement stood despite many of the public believing that Kemp was not good enough and unworthy of the Title. A number of commentators believed the situation was rigged and were outraged at the situation.

== First defence ==
Kemp was keen to defend his otherwise empty title and to demonstrate his skills to the public. He wanted to prove he was worthy and so accepted a title challenge from Thomas Clifford, a fellow Australian. The race was set down for 11 February 1888 on the Parramatta River, Sydney, over the usual distance of three and a quarter miles and for a stake of £200 a side. Because of the situation more interest was shown by the public for this race that might normally have been the case. Several large harbour steamers were near the course and a large number of spectators lined the various vantage points on the banks. Kemp won the toss and chose the southern side which gave him an advantage. Kemp took the lead at the start and pulled steadily away from his opponent until at the mile point he was in the lead by four lengths. No effort by Clifford made any difference and Kemp crossed the line about six lengths ahead. The time was 23m.47.5s.

== Second and third defences ==
Kemp's next challenge was from Edward Hanlan a Canadian. Hanlan was a much tougher proposition as he had been a seven times World Champion from 1880 until 1884 when he was beaten by Beach. The race was scheduled for 5 May 1888 and was again raced on the Parramatta River. This time the stake was £500 a side which was a huge sum of money in those days compared to ordinary wages. Great interest in the race was again taken by the public. At this time Kemp was reported to have the following physical details. A strongly built, muscular man who was 5 feet 9.5 inches (176.5 cm) tall, and had a chest measurement of 40.5 inches (103 cm). His weight was 11 stone 4 pounds (72 kg).

The men got away to a clean start with Kemp taking a small lead early although Hanlan soon levelled. First one, then the other, had the advantage but neither gained much until at Putney a foul occurred and Hanlan took the advantage and shot out four lengths to the good. Kemp then made a most determined effort and was soon only half a length behind. Hanlan spurted again but Kemp kept up and was soon level. Hanlan then showed some signs of distress and slipped behind but then made another effort to overcome the leader. However Kemp sculled away and won by a length in a time of 21m.26s. Hanlan entered a protest over being fouled by Kemp but later withdrew it. The race was considered to be one of the finest ever rowed on that river.

Hanlan must have still fancied his chances and issued another challenge against Kemp. This was accepted and the race was scheduled for 28 September 1888. It was unusual to have had this many Championship races over such a short time. Often a year or longer would pass between these races. Again the stake was £500 a side and was again raced on the Parramatta River. The result was an easy win by nine lengths to Kemp despite Hanlan claiming a foul. The referee disallowed the foul deciding that Hanlan was to blame. This was Hanlan's last World Title race of the twelve he competed in. Kemp's time was 20m.30s.

== Fourth defence ==
Kemp only had a very short time until his next race. He had been challenged for the Title by another Australian, Henry Ernest Searle and the race was agreed to be run on 27 October 1888, on the Parramatta. The usual £500 a side was at stake. At the start Searle took the lead and although Kemp made great efforts he could never overtake the leader who won by about twenty lengths in a time of 22m.44s.

== World Champion again ==
Searle did not have any Title defences in Australia but went to England where he defeated a Canadian challenger, William Joseph O'Connor, on the Thames River in 1889. As Searle was returning on a ship to Australia he contacted typhoid fever and died in Melbourne in December 1889. Peter Kemp then reclaimed the World Title on the grounds that he was the best living sculler and had been the immediate past world champion. O'Conner also laid claim to the Title on the basis that he was the last challenger. This claim had some support in England but as the centre for sculling was Sydney, Kemp's claim was accepted by the leading Australian sporting newspapers, and by implication, the sporting public. There was no controlling body for the World Title. The only time previously the champion had died while 'in office' was when James Renforth died in 1871. The next race was then for an open Title.

== Fifth defence ==
Neil Matterson had been Searle's coach and was now of the opinion that he could beat Kemp and thus challenged for the World Title. It was agreed they would race on 25 April 1890 on the Parramatta River. This time the stake was only £200 a side – the same as for their first race. A large number of people viewed the race and both men were described as being in excellent form. After a splendid start Kemp managed to get ahead and stayed there until the finish. He exhausted Matterson who trailed some two hundred and fifty yards behind Kemp as he crossed the line in 21m.13s.

== Sixth defence ==
Less than a month later, on 15 May, Kemp was back out on the Parramatta water defending his Title and a stake of £200 a side. This time he was against John McLean, another Australian. After the start a great race ensued to Uhr's Point and then Kemp took the lead. Despite a brilliant spurt by McLean he was unable to pass the leader who "won as he liked" by six lengths in a time of 23m.46s.

== Final title race ==
John McLean believed he was good enough to be the World Champion and again challenged Kemp to a race. The date agreed to was 15 December 1890 and once again it was held on the Parramatta River with the stake set at £200 a side. Kemp got away better at the start and was soon had a lead of half a length. Both boats came close together and McLean fouled Kemp who stopped rowing for a couple of strokes. McLean took advantage of this and went half a length ahead. However Kemp soon got underway and spurted and was quickly ahead again. McLean then made an effort and slipped ahead. He sculled well and despite the best work of Kemp he was unable to overtake McLean who finished six lengths ahead in a time of 22m.13s. The referee decided the foul in McLean's favour. Kemp was dissatisfied with the result and offered to row either McLean or Jim Stanbury for £500 a side after April the following year. This did not happen and Stanbury later beat McLean for the title.

== Personal life ==
Peter Kemp was married in 1874 in Windsor to Henrietta Jones. They had nine children but Henrietta died following the birth of daughter Bertha in 1891. Kemp remarried, to Bertha Lawler also in 1891. Two further children were born. Kemp died on 1 December 1921, aged 68 years. He was buried at Rookwood, New South Wales.

Kemp Street in the Sydney suburb of Tennyson Point is named after Kemp. Nearby streets are named after some of the other Australian World Sculling Champions, vis, Beach, Searle, Stanbury, and (George) Towns. They are not far from the Championship course on the Parramatta River.
