= George Towns (rower) =

Australian rower (1869-1961)

- Born: 19 Feb 1869; Bowthorne, New South Wales, Australia
- Died: 1961 (aged 91–92)
- Title: World Champion sculler
- Term: 1901 – 1905 and 1906 – 1907
- Predecessor: Jake Gaudaur Snr. and Jim Stanbury
- Successor: Jim Stanbury and William Webb

George Towns was the Australian Single Sculls World Champion from 1901 to 1905 and 1906 to 1907. He was the last of the seven Australian World Sculling Champion who between them held the title almost uninterrupted from 1876 to 1909.

== Early sculling ==
Towns was born at Bowthorne, near Hinton on the Hunter River, New South Wales, on 19 February 1869. He was the second of eight sons. His father was a boat builder. Towns learned to row on the Hunter River and from an early age was competing in youth events near his home. By 1895 he was dominating the local events. In August 1896 he was matched against Chris Neilsen, who had been experimenting with various boat designs. The race was over three miles on the Hunter River with a stake of £200 a side which was a very large sum for such a race. Normally, non-title matches between professional scullers were for a much smaller sum. Towns won but this limited his prospects of racing other local professionals. So, on the strength of the win, his Newcastle backers were encouraged to think of sending him to England to try to improve and then take the World Title. This was a fairly daring proposition for a comparatively untried sculler but nonetheless money was raised to allow it to happen. The Sydney sporting papers described Towns as the "coming man", by which they expected he was good enough to take the title.

== To England ==
Towns went to England in April 1897 with financial assistance from his supporters. However he saved some money by 'working his passage' on the ship. He dominated the English scullers and in May 1899 won the English Sculling Championship. The following year in September he defended his English title against a challenger from Australia, James Wray. This opened the way for Towns to challenge Jake Gaudaur Snr. for the World Title.

In the spring of 1901, Spencer Gollan, along with two professional oarsmen, Towns and Tom Sullivan (oarsman), broke the record for rowing between Oxford and Putney along the River Thames. The distance was 104 miles and they managed to cover the distance in 13h.55m which beat the previous record by some eight and a half hours. However the group did have a strong stream and all the locks were in their favour, and neither did they carry a coxswain.

== World champion ==
Towns had offered to row anyone in the world, but Gaudaur preferred, for up to £1000 on the Thames. In November 1900 Gaudaur had expressed a wish to retire and apparently declined to row Towns, and then proposed that he hand the title to another Canadian. He must have thought better of it and then accepted a proper challenge for the Title from Towns. The match was agreed to be sculled on 7 September 1901 and it was to take place at Lake of the Woods, Ontario. This was the first time a Championship race took place on a lake. The next was in 1933. Usually such races were on a river. Thousands of spectators witnessed the race. The water was calm and he weather favourable. The course was three miles but with a turn at the halfway point. 'Out and return' matches were popular in North America as it allowed spectators to see both the start and finish of a race. The stake was £250 a side. Gaudaur at six feet tall and who weighed twelve and a half stone had a height and weight advantage over the Australian who was five feet nine inches tall and eleven stone four pounds weight. However at forty-three years of age Gaudaur was nearing the end of his career while his opponent was about at his peak at thirty-two years. Gaudaur had the inside and better position but it was not to help him. Towns shot ahead at the start but the Champion was soon on even terms. However Towns was the stronger of the two and then went ahead to cross the line by four lengths in the time of 20m.30s and become World Champion. On his return to Australia in December 1902 Towns was received by dignitaries in Adelaide, Melbourne, Sydney, and Newcastle.

== Defending the title ==
Some of the earlier title holders, for example Bill Beach, had had numerous challenges to their position but it would seem that nobody was of the opinion that they could beat Towns and no matches were arranged until 1904. Richard Tresidder of Australia, a sculler who was later (1907) Champion of Australia, thought otherwise and challenged. The match was run on 30 July on the Parramatta River. As this was the first Championship match held in Sydney since 1892 great interest was taken by the public and large crowds we on hand to watch proceedings. It was estimated that ninety thousand spectators attended. It was also the first time two Newcastle men had contested the Title. Tresidder won the toss and selected the southern shore. The men got away well and Tresidder forged ahead and by Uhr's Point was ahead by a length. However, Towns rowing steadily gradually reduced the gap and had drawn up level at the mile point. He then went ahead and increasing his lead he shortly afterwards had the race in hand. Although the challenger made several game attempts at spurting it made no difference and Towns crossed the line about ten lengths ahead in a time of 21m.48.8s.

== Loss of championship ==
The next challenge came from Jim Stanbury, another Australian. Stanbury was a tough proposition as he had been World Champion from 1891 to 1896 and had held off several challenges before losing to Gaudaur. The race was agreed to be run on 22 July 1905 on the Parramatta with a stake of £500 a side. The water was smooth and the weather was fine with just a light breeze. Again large crowds were on hand to witness what was expected to one of the great sculling contests. At the start Stanbury at once went to the front and by Uhr's Point was a length and a half ahead. Towns then spurted but could make no impression on the leader. For every effort Towns made Stanbury responded and he crossed the line by two lengths in a time of 19m.47s.

== Champion again ==
Often when one sculler was beaten by another he was offered a return match to have the chance to get even – or, go two down. Stanbury offered Towns and they had another Championship race on the same course almost a year later on 28 July 1906. After the start Towns took an early lead but was soon overhauled by Stanbury who then continued to widen the gap until he was two lengths ahead but at Cabarita he started to show signs of distress. It was evident that his right shoulder was troubling him and about which rumours had been circulating. He had to slow down considerably and Towns then managed to catch up. Stanbury's shoulder finally gave out and from there on the race was a procession. Towns won by about twenty lengths in a time of 19m.53s. This was Stanbury's final Championship race; he had raced in seven and won five.

== Final defence ==
George Towns accepted a challenge from Canadian Edward Durnan and the race was run on the Nepean River, near Sydney on 2 March 1907. This course was a little under three and a quarter miles and had been last used for a Championship race in 1887. About ten thousand spectators made the trip to see the two men compete for the World Championship but rain delayed the start until 4.30pm. Towns got away at a strong pace and soon went ahead of the Canadian whose stroke appeared short. At the mile post Towns was two and a half lengths to the good. Durnan then began to close up and later working in earnest began to overtake the Champion. There was great excitement for the last half-mile with the boats very even but the challenger tired over the last part which allowed Towns to cross a length or two ahead. The time was 22m.27s. The challenger had raced extremely well but had been beaten by a better man.

== Later life ==
George Towns retired from the World Championship by handing the title to his brother Charles Towns. It appears that George arranged for Charles to challenge him and then declined to accept the challenge. Under the rules, such as they were, if a Champion declined a challenge he forfeited his title to the challenger. There was no controlling body responsible for the title (nor for most professional titles) so the arrangement stood. Charles Towns lost the title on his first race when he was beaten by William Webb (rower), a New Zealand man. See also World Sculling Championship.

George Towns travelled to England where he unsuccessfully defended his English Title on the Thames in October 1908. He did not lose without a fight as his conqueror ( Ernest Barry ) had to row a record time over the course to win. The time was 21m.12.4s. After returning to Australia George Towns commenced an oar and scull making business in Sydney near the Parramatta River. Later he expanded this to include boat-building constructing boats for the sport of rowing. His craft were well constructed and sought after. He also coached amateur and professional scullers including later World Champion Richard Arnst. Towns was prominent in rowing associations and clubs and he was instrumental in codifying the rules for the Sculling World Championship as previously it was all fairly laissez-faire. George Towns died in 1961.

A Sydney street at Tennyson Point – Towns Street – is named after George Towns. Nearby streets are named after some of the other Australian World Sculling Champions, vis, Kemp, Searle, Stanbury, and Beach. They are not far from the Championship course on the Parramatta River.
