= Henry Ernest Searle =

Australian rower (1866–1889)

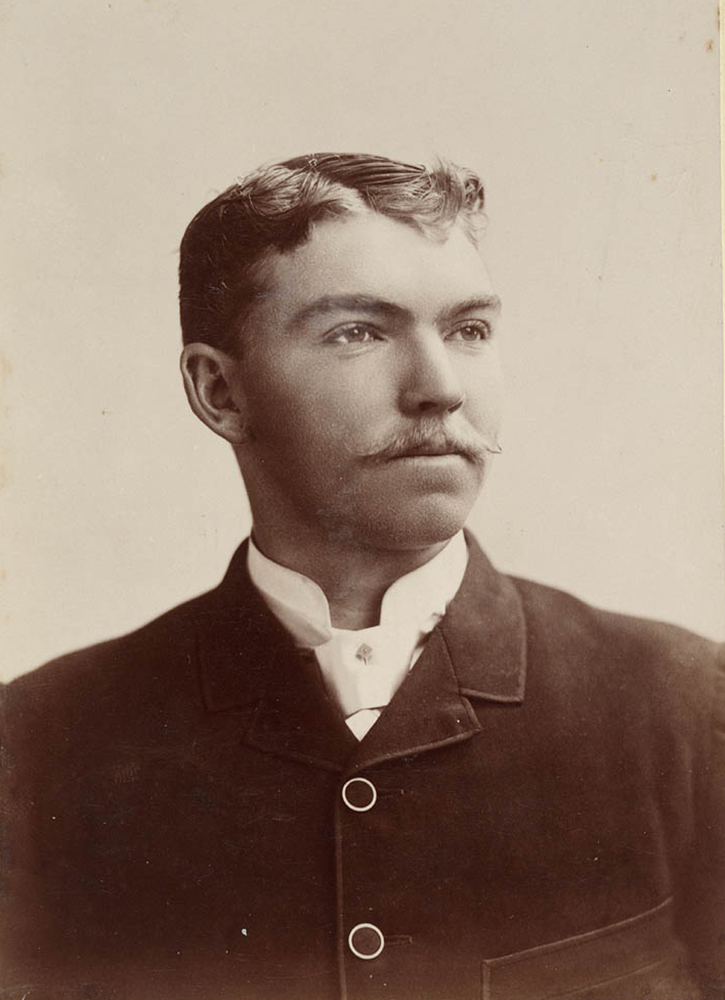
- Henry Searle in 1889
- Born: Henry Searle; 14 July 1866; Grafton, New South Wales, Australia
- Died: 10 December 1889 (aged 23); Melbourne, Australia
- Resting place: Maclean Cemetery, New South Wales
- Other names: The Clarence River Comet
- Title: World champion sculler
- Term: 1888–1889
- Predecessor: Peter Kemp
- Successor: Peter Kemp

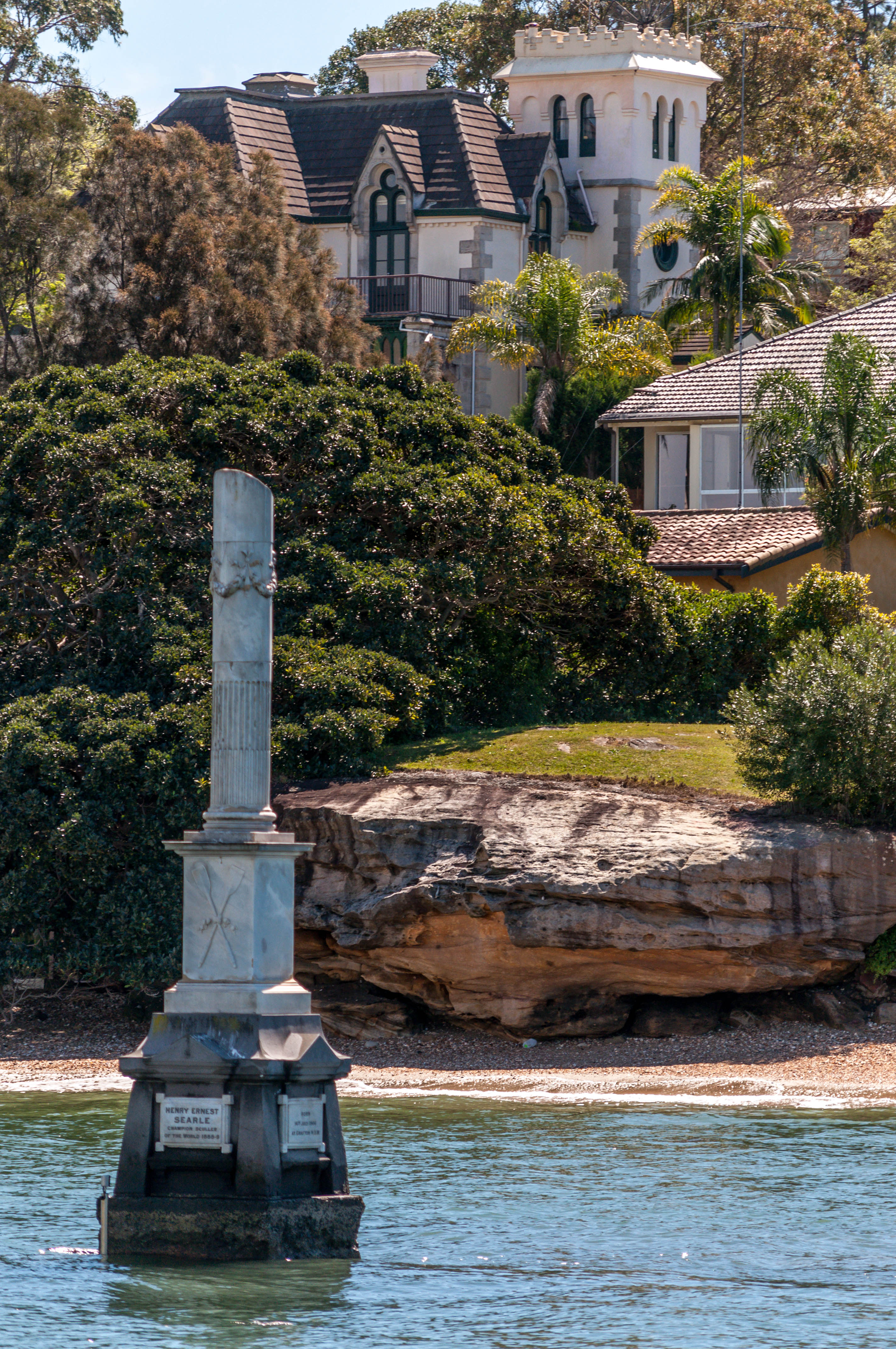
Henry Searle Sculling Monument, Parramatta River course, near Henley.

Henry Ernest Searle (1866–1889), was a professional Australian sculler, who also was the World Sculling Champion from 1888 until his premature death from typhoid in 1889.

Born on 14 July 1866 at Grafton, New South Wales to Henry Samuel Searle, bootmaker, and his wife Mary Ann, née Brooks. The family later moved to Esk Island, lower Clarence River, where they farmed at subsistence level.

== Sculling career ==
Searle soon learnt to scull and rowed his brother and sisters 3 miles (4.8 km) to and from school. At 18 Searle first competed in a skiff race and for three years raced with some success at local regattas. His first important victory was the defeat of a Sydney professional in an out-rigger handicap at Grafton in January 1888.

Moving to Sydney, Searle was coached by an established sculler Neil Matterson, and with the financial backing of John and Thomas Spencer (Sydney brothers who a decade earlier had backed Edward Trickett), he began a strenuous training programme and won four matches between June and October. However the Grafton Daily Examiner of 22 June 1922 states that Searle was first coached by a boatbuilder and amateur oarsman of the lower Clarence River named Donald Macdonald.

== World Champion ==
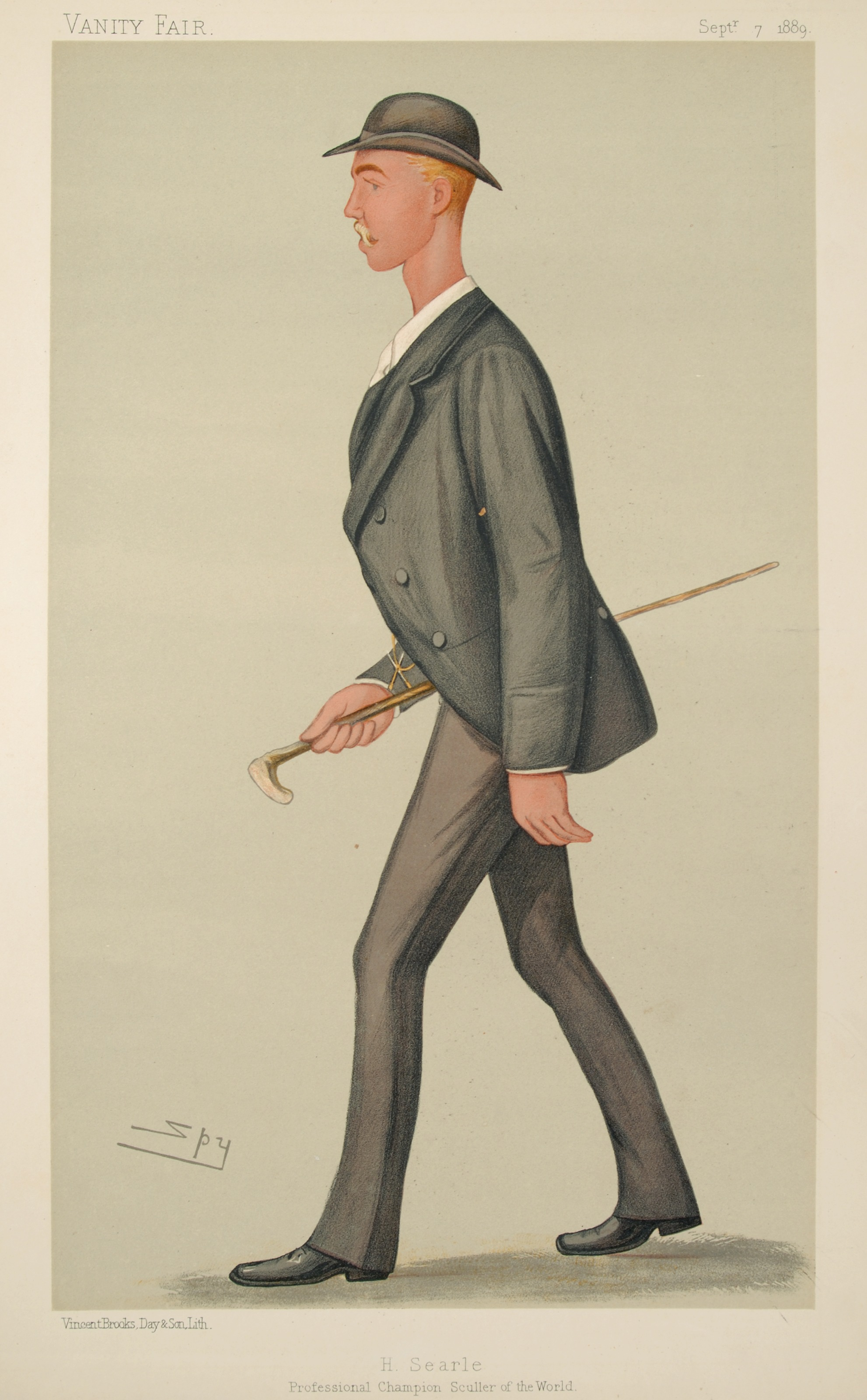
"Professional Champion Sculler of the World" Searle as caricatured by Spy (Leslie Ward) in Vanity Fair, September 1889

After failing to get a match with the former World Champion Ned Hanlan, Searle challenged the then champion Peter Kemp. On 27 October 1888 the match took place on the Parramatta River. The usual £500 a side was at stake as well as the Title. At the start Searle took the lead and although Kemp made great efforts he could never overtake the leader who won by about twenty lengths in a time of 22 minutes and 44 seconds. Thus Searle was World Champion. .

Searle, Matterson and other 'cracks', including Bill Beach, next competed in the 'Grand Aquatic Carnival' rowed in Brisbane between 5 and 11 December.

In a heat Searle and Matterson continually and deliberately fouled Beach, for which they were disqualified from the heat but not, to the public's annoyance, from the carnival. Consequently, they finished first and third in the final after Beach refused to row.

== First Defence ==
In 1889 with his stocks low Searle, accompanied by Matterson, went to England to race the Canadian champion William Joseph O'Connor for £500 a side. This race was held on the Thames River on the Championship Course. It was reported that 100,000 people were on hand to see this match. O’Connor was first away and rowing a fast stroke soon had an advantage of half a length. However at the Crabtree Searle had drawn up level and shortly afterwards was a length to the good. A little later O'Connor was showing signs of distress and after this the race was a procession. Searle won by about ten lengths in the fast time of 22 minutes and 42 seconds.

== Death & funeral ==
While returning to Australia in the "Austral", Searle contracted typhoid fever; he left the ship at Melbourne, and died three weeks later on 10 December 1889 at the Williamstown Sanatorium, after a very public illness. The colonies plunged into mourning with editorials, poems and sermons bewailing the loss of the young hero. Thousands lined Melbourne streets to see his body pass, and in Sydney an estimated crowd of 170,000 packed the city for his memorial service. Approximately 2500 attended in stifling heat to see him buried in the Maclean cemetery.

== Style ==
Searle was a great sculler; no stylist, he had a powerful action characterized by perfect boat control; he trained much harder than was usual and could break opponents with sudden, repeated and sustained bursts of speed. He was 5 ft 10 ins (178 cm) tall, rowed at 11 stone 9 lbs. (74 kg), but weighed 13 stone 3 lbs. (84 kg) when out of training; his measurements were: chest 41½ ins (105 cm), biceps 13½ ins (34 cm), forearm 11 ins (28 cm), thigh 22 ins (56 cm) and calf 16 ins (41 cm). He was quiet with a genial and unassuming disposition.

== Memorials ==
A memorial to Searle, erected in 1891, stands on The Brothers rocks at the finish of the Parramatta River course, near Henley. It consists of a broken column on a plinth - broken by design to symbolise a life taken young.

A Sydney street at Tennyson Point is named after Henry Searle. Nearby streets are named after some of the other early Australian World Professional Sculling Champions, viz., Bill Beach, Peter Kemp (rower), Jim Stanbury, and George Towns (rower). They are not far from the old Championship Course on the Parramatta River.

In the Melbourne suburb of Berwick is a park called the Henry Searle Reserve.

In 2012 Searle was inducted into the Sport Australia Hall of Fame.

== Published references ==
- S. C. Bennett, "The Clarence Comet: The career of Henry Searle", 1866–89, 1973
- Wanganui Herald newspaper 4 Sept 1889, 10 Sept 1889
- Town and Country Journal, 14 Sept, 14 Dec 1889
- H. E. Searle, 'How I won the world's championship', Leeds Times, 5 October 1889. A transcript is at "Hear The Boat Sing" website at http://hear-the-boat-sing.blogspot.co.nz/search/label/henry%20Searle
- The Sydney Morning Herald, 16, 17 Dec 1889.
- Australian Dictionary of Biography, Volume 6, Melbourne University Press, 1976, pp 99–100.
- Vanity Fair, "H. Searle/ Professional Champion Sculler of the World" (Spy), 7 September 1889
- Seven Australian World Champion Scullers, ISBN 978-0-473-17699-0, published 2010.

== Online references ==
- http://www.parliament.nsw.gov.au/prod/parlment/hansart.nsf/V3Key/LA19940303035 Henry Searle Sculling Monument
- http://en.wikibooks.org/wiki/The_Rowers_of_Vanity_Fair/Searle_HE More details on Searle

== Photo gallery ==
Henry Searle Images

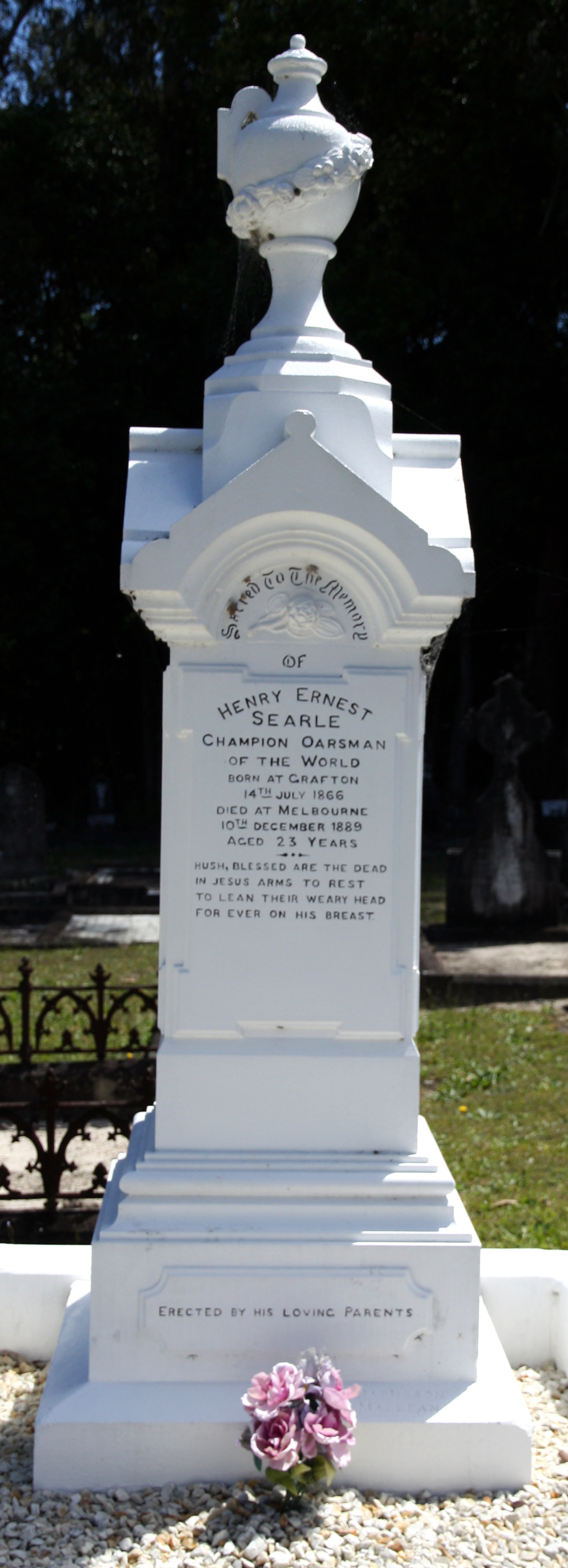
Searle's Grave in Maclean, NSW

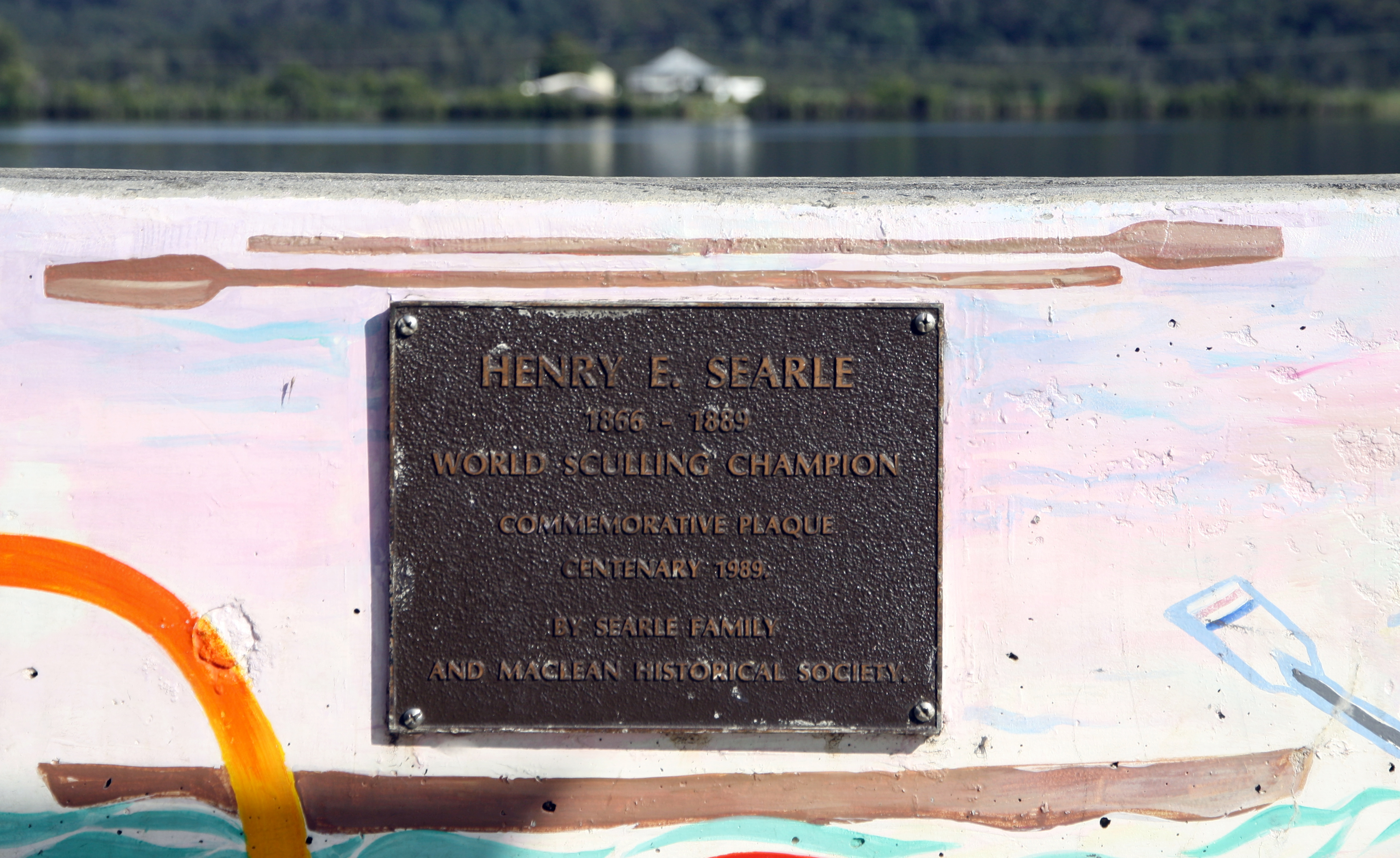
Plaque on river-front at Maclean NSW
