= Bill Beach (rower) =

Australian rower

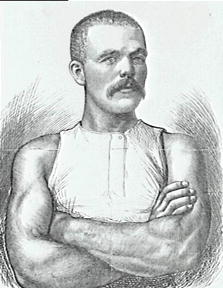
- Bill Beach, Champion Sculler of the World 1884–1887
- Born: William Beach; 6 September 1850; Chertsey, Surrey, England
- Died: 28 January 1935 (aged 84); Brownsville, New South Wales, Australia
- Resting place: St Luke's Church of England cemetery, Brownsville
- Title: World champion sculler
- Term: 1884–1887
- Predecessor: Ned Hanlan
- Successor: Peter Kemp

William Beach (6 September 1850 – 28 January 1935) was a professional Australian sculler. He was unbeaten as World Sculling Champion from 1884 to 1887.

Beach was born in Chertsey, Surrey, England, to Alexander Beach, blacksmith, and his wife Mary, née Gibbons. Beach's family migrated to New South Wales while he was a small child. He lived at Dapto for most of his life, learning to row on Lake Illawarra. He began his sporting career in a wooden tub on the Macquarie Rivulet and ended it as champion sculler of the world.

Beach trained as a blacksmith like his father and seems to have been a fisherman for a time. According to local legend, Beach won his first race as a teenager against a local publican, either for a bottle of brandy or 5s.

== Early rowing career ==
Beach was said to have visited the sculler, Edward Trickett, but the date of his first race on Sydney Harbour is uncertain: the Illawarra Mercury, 1 February 1935, claimed 1875–76 but the Town and Country Journal, December 1881, recorded that he won the handicap skiff race for amateurs on Woolloomooloo Bay on the 24th. However, a New Zealand newspaper, the Otago Witness of 9 December 1887, claims his debut as an oarsman was in December 1880. It states that there followed several matches in the next few months.

Among the donors of his £25 prize was the publican J. G. Deeble, who became his sponsor and claimed as his discoverer. In other races he was said to have won £150 with which he built his home at Dapto. On Boxing Day at Pyrmont he was beaten in the allcomers' handicap skiff race by A. Pearce. On 25 February 1882 he won £50 in a match with Solomons, and in October in his first outrigger race he was second for the Punch trophy on the Parramatta River, finishing ahead of Trickett.

In December 1883 he defeated Trickett for the James Henry trophy of £150. On 26 January 1884 he finished ahead of Trickett but, after a protest, lost when the race was rowed again; on 12 April he beat Trickett for £200 a side, the Australian Sculling Championship and the right to race against Ned Hanlan.

== Champion sculler of the world ==
Beach was 33 when he challenged Ned Hanlan for his first attempt at the World Sculling Championship. Hanlan had come to Australia that year to give sculling exhibitions. He claimed he was out of condition and went off on tours of all the eastern states. However Beach's credentials seemed limited and the Canadian reputedly had never lost a race. Hanlan believed Beach wouldn't stand a chance. The race was on the Parramatta River was on 16 August 1884 and was rowed over a distance of 3 miles 330 yards (5.13 km) with a stake of £500 a side. Beach won by six or seven lengths in a time of 20m.28s. After the race, Hanlan could not accept the fact that his long reign had ended, blaming the Australian climate, the treacherous tides and an excess of hospitality for his defeat, which he took very badly.

== Title defences ==
Beach’s first defence was against another Australian, Thomas Clifford on 28 February 1885. This race was also on the Parramatta River. Only three weeks before the race Clifford had raced and lost to Hanlan so the outlook was not good for him. After the start Beach soon led. Although Clifford made a grand attempt he was unable to overtake the leader who finished only a length ahead. The time was 26m.1.5s.

The second defence took place just a month later on 28 March 1885 against Hanlan, again for a stake of £500 a side. A large crowd came to the by now usual course on the Parramatta River. This race was one of the better ones as for most of the distance there was little between them. The racing was close and exciting and approaching the finishing post both boats were almost bow to bow. Beach put in a final terrific effort and increased his advantage and won amidst wild excitement by the spectators.

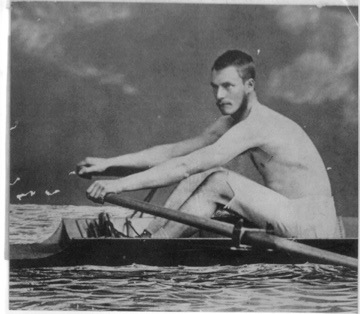
Charles Amos Messenger – Champion Sculler of Victoria, former opponent and later coach of Bill Beach

One indicator of how thrilled the residents of Double Bay were at Bill Beach's win against Hanlan was the testimonial presentation to his coach, Charles Amos Messenger. Messenger, a former competitor of Beach, trained him to win this race. At a special meeting held on Wednesday April 1 under the Auspices of the Double Bay Amateur Sailing Club held at Mortimers Hotel, Beach's supporters presented Messenger with a gold watch.

The next defence was against Australian Neil Matterson which took place on 18 December 1885 on the Parramatta. This time the stake was only £200 a side. Beach took the lead at the start and won easily and without a great effort.

On 27 March 1886 Beach left for London and in August won the final of the International Sweepstake, against John Teemer, Bubear, Lee and others on the Thames for a prize of £1200. On 18 September 1886 he successfully defended his title against Jake Gaudaur Snr. on the Championship Course on the Thames for £1000. That course was a little longer than the Parramatta course, being about four and a quarter miles long. This was also an interesting race in that race each rower in turn stopped from exhaustion and slumped in his boat. Beach managed to recover sufficiently to continue rowing a won the race in 22m.29s. On 25 September 1886 Beach was again out on the Thames rowing against Wallace Ross for £1000 and the World Championship. It was most unusual to have title matches this close together as often many months would go by between races. The result was never in doubt and Beach won easily.

Beach returned to Sydney on 3 December 1886. He was met by the president of the Rowing Association who congratulated him 'on his great achievements … [and] his steady, careful, upright and manly character'. Welcomed as a hero by band and banners, he was presented to Governor Lord Carrington and his lady on the way to Sydney Town Hall where he was met by the mayor and the premier and given an illuminated address.

Beach’s final Title race was against his old foe Ned Hanlan which took place on 26 November 1887. This race was held on the Nepean River, near Sydney. Special trains ran from Sydney, Bathurst and Goulburn to take thousands of spectators to the course. The race was again close although Beach was always in the lead even though he was closely pressed by Hanlan. For the third time Beach defeated Hanlan for the World Championship.

After the race Beach announced that he would forfeit the title to his young training partner, Peter Kemp (rower), instead of accepting his challenge. This action was controversial but Beach thus was the only World Champion sculler of his era to retire undefeated – the next was in 1938. His seven wins out of seven races in the event was unique. Hanlan also gained seven wins but that was from twelve races. The next closest was Richard Arnst who had six wins in eight races.

On the Parramatta River on 27 November 1888 in a race with Hanlan for £500 a side, Beach won by three lengths in the presence of 5000 spectators. This was not a Championship match – just a normal money match between professional scullers. Beach was then 5 ft 9½ ins (177 cm) tall with a 42 ins (107 cm) chest, 15½ ins (39 cm) biceps, 16 ins (41 cm) calf and a weight of 170 lbs (77 kg).

== Life after sculling ==
After a short time in Sydney he returned to Dapto to his home in Kanahooka Road – 'Champion Cottage', where he remained until his death in 1935 at the age of 84. At Dapto, Beach was made a trustee of the showground and Gooseberry and Hooker Islands in Lake Illawarra, and also became president of the Regatta Club, alderman of the Central Illawarra Council and patron of the Boy Scouts. Beach continued to be involved in rowing and was sometimes appointed umpire in important matches. For example, he was the umpire in the Ernest Barry and Alf Felton Title match in 1920.

In 1873 at Brownsville he married Sarah Duley; they had six sons and six daughters. He died at Brownsville on 28 January 1935 and was buried at St Luke's Church of England cemetery. He was predeceased by his wife and survived by ten children.

== Memorial ==
There are monuments in his memory in Cabarita Park, Sydney, and in Bill Beach Park, Mullet Creek, Dapto.

A Sydney street at Tennyson Point – Beach Street – is named after Bill Beach. Nearby streets are named after some of the other Australian World Sculling Champions, vis Kemp, Searle, Stanbury, and (George) Towns. They are not far from the Championship course on the Parramatta River. Additionally, another nearby street is named after John Teemer, an American rower and one time opponent of Beach. Also at Surfers Paradise, Queensland, a street is named after Beach. Beach Road is nearby those named after other rowers, vis Trickett Street, Hanlan Street, Clifford Street, and Laycock Street.
