= Jim Stanbury =

Australian rower

- Born: 25 February 1868; Mullet Island, New South Wales
- Died: 11 December 1945 (aged 77); Ryde, New South Wales
- Title: World Champion sculler
- Term: 1890-1896
- Predecessor: John McLean (rower) and George Towns
- Successor: Jacob Gaudaur and George Towns

James Stanbury (25 February 1868 – 11 December 1945) was a world champion sculler.

Stanbury was born on Mullet Island on the Hawkesbury River, New South Wales and was the successor of John McLean in the rowing championship of the world. In 1887, he won the first prize in the Lake Bathurst handicap, but was later beaten the same year by Christian Neilson in a race over the Parramatta championship course. The next year he defeated Julius Wulf, but was himself defeated by Searle in a very toughly fought contest. In 1890 Stanbury defeated O'Connor, the American champion, twice. O'Connor had been beaten by Searle on the Thames in the previous year, in each case over the Parramatta course.

On 28 April 1891 he defeated John McLean, another New South Wales sculler, over the same course for the Championship of the World. The time was 22m.15s. These two had a return Title match on 7 July with Stanbury the victor in a time of 18m.25s. The course was the Shorter Parramatta course. On 2 May 1892 he had another win for the World Title when he beat Tom Sullivan, the New Zealand sculler, over the Parramatta course. Again this was on the short course and the time was 17m.26s. Stanbury had another Title win on 13 July 1896 when he beat Charles R Harding on the Thames in a time of 21m 51s. On 7 Sept 1896, he lost the Title to Jacob Gaudaur (known as 'Jake') on the Thames course in the time of 23m.1s. Gaudaur had a couple of Title Races and eventually lost to another Australian George Towns.

On 22 July 1905, Stanbury regained the World Championship. by beating Towns on the Parramatta Course in a time of 19m.4s. In a return match a year later (26 July 1906) Stanbury failed to retain the Title with Towns securing it for the second time. Thus Stanbury raced in seven title races and won five of them.
