= The Tyneside Songster by J. W. Swanston =

Book by J. W. Swanston

The Tyneside Songster
- Author: J. W. Swanston
- Language: English (Geordie dialect)
- Genre: chapbook
- Publisher: J. W. Swanston
- Publication date: possibly early to mid-1880s
- Publication place: United Kingdom
- Media type: Print
- Pages: 16 pages – 39 songs

The Tyneside Songster (or to give it its full title – "The Tyneside Songster containing a splendid collection of Local Songs by popular Authors, in the Northumbrian Dialect Printed by J W Swanston, 67 & 69 St Andrews Street, Newcastle and may be had at all Booksellers, Newsagents, &c" is a chapbook of Geordie folk song consisting of 39 songs, crammed into its meagre 16 pages, and published in the 1880s by J. W. Swanston, a Newcastle printer and publisher.

== The publication ==
The contents include a general collection of, either at that time or sometime earlier, well known and popular, local songs written by a collection of songwriters. A set of the original documents is retained by the Tyne & Wear Archives and Museum Service. This is the record office for the cities and districts of Newcastle, Gateshead, Sunderland, South Tyneside and North Tyneside.

The front cover of the book was as thus :-
THE
Tyneside
SONGSTER
CONTAINING
A splendid collection of Local Songs by
popular Authors, in the Northumbrian
Dialect
– - – - – - – - – - – -

– - – - – - – - – - – -
NEWCASTLE
Printed by J W SWANSTON, 67 & 69 St Andrews Street
and may be had at all Booksellers, Newsagents, &c
– - – - – - – - – - – -
One, two, or three copies of this Song Book may be had direct from the
Printer, for the published price, with an additional halfpenny for postage,
and will be sent to any address in the United Kingdom. Larger numbers
at the same rate.

On the top right, above the title, is printed the price, “One Penny”

== Contents ==
are as below :-

	title	songwriter	tune	comments	notes	ref
1	Front cover					
3	Sandgate Lassie's Lament (The)	Henry Robson				
4	Bewildor'd Pitman (The)		The King of the cannibal Islands			
4	Howden for Jarrow. Loup oot	Harry Haldane		The pseudonym of Richard Oliver Heslop		
5	Bonny Clock Feyce (The)	Robert Nunn	Cole Hole			
5	Sweet Tyneside	T Kennedy	Kelvin Grove			
5	Lizzie Mudie's Ghost. Or the Jenny Howlet	W Armstrong				
9	Cappy or the Pitman's dog	W Mitford				
9	Cum an' stand a Jill		The moon behind the hill			
12	Jemmy stops lang at the fair	Joseph Skipsey				
12	Coaly Tyne		Auld Lang Syne			
12	Sairt failed Hinney	??	??			
13	Sandgate Lass on Ropery Banks (The)	Robert Nunn	The Skipper's Wedding			
13	Hey ye seen wor Cuddy	George Guthrie	The King of the cannibal Islands			
13	Elsie Marley	?	?			
14	Pitman's Dream (The)		Newcastle Fair			
14	Half-Drowned Skipper (The)		Cvhapter of Donkeys			
14	Waggoner (The)					
15	Honest Working Man (The)		Runaway Jack			
15	Muther's best, iv a, (A)		Newcastle is my native place			
15	Wor Charlie's a Medium		Cappy's the dog	"Wor Geordy's a Medium" in index		
16	Pitman's Happy Times (The)	J P Robson	In the days when we went Gipsying			
16	D'ye ken John Peel	John Woodcock Graves				
16	advert for "The Sailor's Songbook"					
The following songs also appear in the book, but the page numbers are unknown
	Beggar's Wedding (The)	William Stephenson	Quayside Shaver			
	Blyth Camps (or The Girl I Left Behind Me)	unknown				
	Cliffs of Old Tynemouth (The)		Leitch David Ross			
	Dance To Thy Daddy		Watson William			
	Give me life's largest cup					
	I attempt from Love's Sickness to Fly					
	(Weel May) The Keel Row					
	Marsden Rock	John Peacock	Jockey to the fair	Marsden Rocks in index		
	Noodle – (The)	John Brodie Gilroy	Jeannette and Jeannot			
	Peter Waggy	Henry Robson		Written in 1826		
	Pitman's Courtship – (The)	William Mitford	The night before Larry was stretched			
	Pound of tea (The)	John Stobbs	Dame Durdon			
	Rifleman Sowljor (The)	J P Robson		appeared in his book "Evangeline" or The spirit of progress – Which contains his rather lengthy poem of the same name together with many more shorter works		
	Sandhill Monkey (The)	William Stephenson	Drops of Brandy			
	Till the Tide cums in	Henry Robson				
	Washing-Day – (The)	Thomas Wilson	There's nae luck aboot the hoose	actually entitled "The Weshin'-day" in this book		
	X. Y. Z. At Newcastle Races, 1814 (or Pitmen's Luck)	William Mitford				

== Notes ==
Due to the only copy of the book available being damaged, it was not able to ascertain the page numbers of many of the songs. Therefore, the second section the above, list those songs in alphabetic order. Can anyone help with the numbering of these pages?

== See also ==
- Geordie dialect words
- J. W. Swanston
