= Wallace Ross =

Wallace Ross may refer to:

- Wallace Ross (rower) (1857–1895), Canadian rower
- Wallace Michael Ross (1920–2010), English organist
- Wally Ross (1922–2013), sailing pioneer

== See also ==
- Ross Wallace (born 1985), Scottish footballer
