= James Shotton =

English artist (1824–1896)

Portrait of Giuseppe Garibaldi

James Shotton (1824–1896) was a North Shields born 19th-century artist. He painted a portrait of Thomas Haswell, a North Shields songwriter.

== Brief details ==
Shotton was born in North Shields in 1824.

He showed a talent for drawing from an early age and later attended the Royal Academy Schools, where he became a friend of William Holman Hunt.

When his father died he returned to North Shields. In 1857, he designed the second domestic Victorian Turkish bath to be built in England at Tyneside House, home of local ironmaster George Crawshay. (Note: For many years it had been assumed that this was the first such bath, but a record has now been found to indicate that there was an earlier one.) Shotton had earlier been taken by Crawshay to see the first Victorian Turkish bath in the British Isles being built at Blarney, near Cork in Ireland. In 1869, Shotton designed the Cecil Street Turkish Baths in North Shields, in which Crawshay had shares, and followed this in 1874 by designing one in Pilgrim Street for the Newcastle-upon-Tyne Turkish Bath Company Limited.

After the earlier resumption of his artistic studies, he gained quite a reputation being accepted by the Royal Academy in 1863. He was a member of the Cullercoats Artists' Colony, and he rarely exhibited his work, but was well regarded as a portrait painter, twice painting Wesley Stoker Barker Woolhouse (the noted North Shields mathematician), one version of which was exhibited at the Royal Academy in 1863; and also James Edington.

He also met the Italian patriot Giuseppe Garibaldi when he stayed in Tynemouth in 1854, and painted his portrait. The two remained lifelong friends and continued corresponding for many years.

Shotton died in North Shields in 1896.

== Works ==
These include :-

- The 18 paintings forming the “Shotton Bequest” are owned by North Tyneside Council
  - Wesley Stoker Barker Woolhouse FRAS (1809–1893), Born in North Shields he an actuary, mathematician, designer, writer and musical theorist, and Fellow of the Royal Astronomical Society. (painted c1854 – size 1250 x 1000 mm)
  - Wesley Stoker Barker Woolhouse FRAS (1809–1893) (painted c1862 – size 1250 x 1000 mm)
  - James Edington (size 520 x 410 mm)
  - William Hutton, FGS, was a Fellow of the Geological Society (painted c1853 size 750 x 620 mm)
  - A Bit of Frenchman's Bay, South Shields (size 350 x 495 mm)
  - Tynemouth Castle (by the time this was painted, the lighthouse had been demolished (size 350 x 500 mm)
  - North Shields from the River Mouth (the Low Light and High Light, built in 1810 (and centre picture) were navigation aids for shipping entering the mouth of the River Tyne and still remain, although now unused (size 400 x 700)
  - The Lilburn Tower, Dunstanburgh, Northumberland. It is the oldest remaining part of Dunstanburgh Castle, and was also painted by J. M. W. Turner (size 550 x 725 mm)
  - Warkworth, Northumberland, Early Morning – an atmospheric view (size 520 x 740 mm)
  - Fairies' Kettle Rocks - near Caldbeck, Cumbria (size 395 x 745 mm)
  - Cliffs of the Fairies' Kettle, near Caldbeck, Cumbria (size 470 x 670 mm)
  - Where nothing is heard but the sea' (size 400 x 700 mm)
  - A mound of even-sloping side wherein a hundred stately beeches gre'. The title of this painting is taken from the ninth book of Tennyson's “Idylls of the King”, the tale of Pelleas and Ettarre. (size 590 x 440 mm)
  - Christ on His Way to Calvary (inspired by Paolo Veronese - and size 590 x 720 mm)
  - Saint Catherine (inspired by Raphael) and size 850 x 550 mm)
  - Women and Attendants with Mirror (inspired by Titian and size 940 x 750 mm)
  - Female Nude (size 1030 x 520 mm)
  - Sandstone of the Coal Measures of Northumberland (size 575 x 955 mm)
- Newcastle University collection.
  - Giuseppe Garibaldi (1807–1882) (painted 1854 and size 730 x 615 mm)
- South Shields Museum & Art Gallery
  - Solomon Sutherland (size 842 x 715 mm)
- North Shields Public Library
  - Thomas Haswell, a North Shields schoolteacher, headmaster and songwriter, a portrait presented to the Public Library at North Shields 12 months after his death on 8 Dec 1889
- In private collection
  - Moonrise over North Shields harbour view
  - Fishing boats near Dover Castle (inspired by Joseph Mallord William Turner

== See also ==
Geordie dialect words
Thomas Haswell
The Shields Garland
