= George Pickering (poet) =

English poet (1758–1826)

George Pickering (1758–1826) was an 18th-century poet and songwriter, born in Simonburn. His most famous work is probably Donocht Head.

== Early life ==
George Pickering was born in Simonburn, Northumberland in January 1758. His baptism register shows he was baptised on 11 January 1758. He was the eldest son of George Pickering, described as "A Gentleman", who was employed as Land Steward to Sir Lancelot Allgood, of Nunwick, and later Sir William Middleton of Belsay Castle, Northumberland, in whose employ he died.

George received his basic education from Mr Joseph Atkinson, a local schoolmaster, continuing c1770 (or 1771) to learn languages, under Reverend Joseph Harrison of Haydon Bridge Grammar School. He was a first class scholar, eager and willing to learn.

In December 1776 George Pickering became a clerk in Mr Davidson's Solicitors office, managing the stamp-office for Northumberland, Newcastle, and Berwick, a position of considerable trust. It was here that he met Thomas Bedingfeld and discovered that they both held a great interest in classic, elegant literature.

== Later life ==
Sometime after the death of Thomas Bedingfeld in November 1789, it appears that Mr Pickering went abroad.

However, according to Allan's Illustrated Edition of Tyneside songs William Brockie stated that he had a very sad ending, dying insane at the house of his sister in Kibblesworth, on 28 July 1826.
He was buried in St Andrews, Lamesley Churchyard, where a tombstone to his memory was erected by his sister.

It was said by William Brockie about George Pickering that "he was of an unsteady, erratic temperament".

== Works ==
When this book was published in 1815 it states that it "contains the whole of the works that the editor has been able to collect"

At one time, Donocht Head had been attributed to Robert Burns, but James Currie, in his book on the works of Burns states, that – Burns wrote to a friend "Donocht-head is not mine. I would give ten pounds it were"

These include :-
Donocht Head
Epitaph on his father
To sleep
Epistle to T D, Esq. Confined to his chamber by the rheumatism in his knee
Chester Well
Hunting Song, sung by a member of the Forest Hunt, Newcastle on conclusion of the Hunting Season in 1786 and several succeeding years and also sung at the Theatre Royal by Mr Marshall
To Hope – (supposed to be to Mrs. Calmady, a young widow, sometime resident in Newcastle)
To Orlando
The moaning clock and hollow wind
Sonnet – (Chill o'er the heath the blast tempestuous roars)
Sweet Anna – (A Song)
The Inn
Ode, on the thirty-first of December
To Hope. – (Friend of the wretch whose bosom bleeds)
On the Slave Trade. – Written in consequence of the majority in the House of Commons in favour of William Wilberforce's motion for the abolition of the Slave Trade
On gold
Winter
Epistle – Thomas Paine
Penitentiary Epistle – Tom Paine's portfolio – The morning after his execution at Lincoln, and handed to the world by his executor, the respectable and renowned Mr John Ketch
The Crow-Nest
Lapponian Poetry, by Mr Pickering and Mr Bedingfeld
The Origin of Britain – (A Fragment. by Mr Pickering)

== See also ==
- Geordie dialect words

== Notes ==
Some of the above information is taken from the book of collected materials by James Ellis and titled :-
Poetry, Fugitive and Original; by the late Thomas Bedingfeld, Esquire, and Mr. George Pickering. With notes and some additional pieces by a Friend", Newcastle, 1815, octavo
Dedicated to (Sir) Walter Scott Esquire.
Printed and sold by S. Hodgson, Union Street; Newcastle.
Sold also by Mr Charnley, Messrs Akenhead, and Mr. Finlay, Newcastle; and Messrs Craddock and Joy, Paternoster Row, London, 1815.
Details collected and collated by James Ellis
