= Thomas Bedingfeld =

English poet (1760–1789)

- Born: 18 February 1760
- Died: 5 November 1789 (aged 29)

Thomas Bedingfeld (18 February 1760 – 5 November 1789), poet, second son of Edward Bedingfeld, Esquire, of York, and Mary, daughter of Sir John Swinburne, of Capheaton, Northumberland, was born at York on 18 February 1760, and educated at the University of Liège.

In 1780 he was placed in the office of Mr. John Davidson, of Newcastle upon Tyne, with a view to the study of conveyancing. There he became acquainted with George Pickering and James Ellis, who, together with Mr. Davidson's sons, formed a literary fraternity not very common in a lawyer's office.

In 1784 Bedingfeld moved to Lincoln's Inn, and continued his legal studies under Matthew Duane, the eminent conveyancer, and his nephew, Mr. Bray. In 1787 he commenced practice as a chamber counsel–being, as a catholic, incapable of being called to the bar–and he was rising rapidly in his profession when his career was terminated by his death, which occurred in London on 5 November 1789. In person he is said to have resembled his celebrated contemporary, William Pitt, so much as sometimes to have been mistaken for him by the London populace.

His poems were surreptitiously published in London–"Poems by T. B–––g––––d, Esquire, of the Inner Temple", 1800. Afterwards they were collected lay James Ellis, one of his youthful associates, and published under the title of "Poetry, Fugitive and Original; by the late Thomas Bedingfeld, Esquire, and Mr. George Pickering. With notes and some additional pieces by a Friend", Newcastle, 1815, octavo. Dedicated to Sir Walter Scott. The most laboured of his poems is 'The Triumph of Beauty', addressed to the Duchess of Devonshire on her successful canvass for Charles James Fox in 1784; but his best-known piece is the Instructions to a Porter, which has appeared in several collections. (Note: Memoir by James Ellis, 1815) (Note: Richardson's Local Historian's Table Book, Historical Division, ii. 327, iii. 331) (Note: Gentlemen's Magazine lix. 1058, 1127) (Note: European Magazine xvi. 392.)
