= George Guthrie (songwriter) =

British musician

George Guthrie (born 1842, in Newcastle) moved away from the town eastwards towards the coast, and worked as a blacksmith in Wallsend and Sunderland.

He came to the attention of Joe Wilson, the great Music Hall performer, who said that many of Guthrie’s songs had considerable merit, and were much to be admired.

One of his songs "Heh ye seen wor Cuddy" sung to the tune of "The King of the Cannibal Islands" appears on page 13 of J. W. Swanston’s The Tyneside Songster and page 518 of Thomas Allan’s illustrated edition of Tyneside Songs and Readings.

== See also ==
- Geordie dialect words
- Thomas Allan
- Allan's Illustrated Edition of Tyneside Songs and Readings
- The Tyneside Songster by J W Swanston
- J. W. Swanston
