= Kings Hotel =

Heritage-listed pub in Sydney, Australia

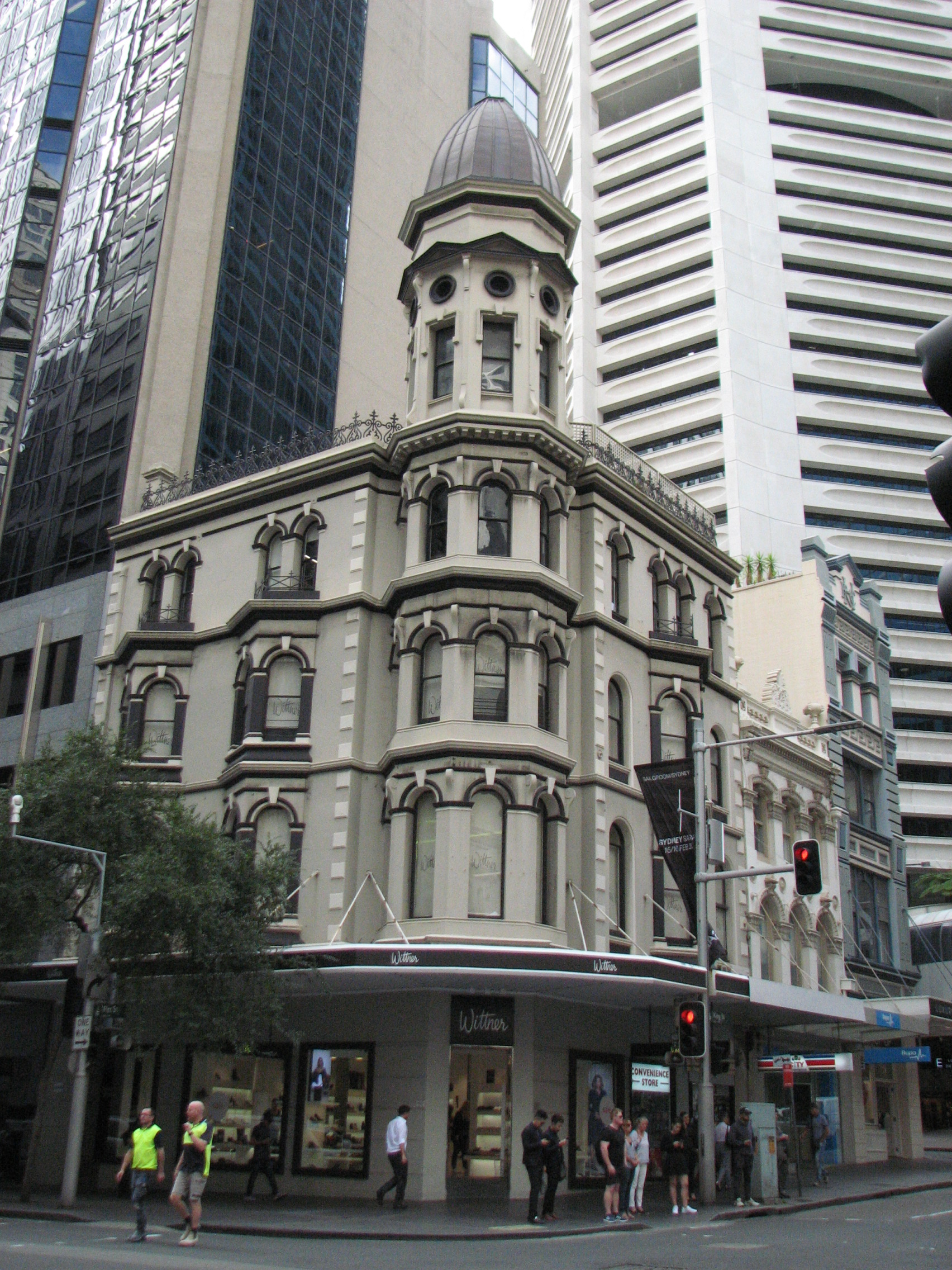
- The former King's Hotel, Sydney

- Location within Sydney Location within Australia
- 33.8688°S 151.2085°E
- Location: 138–140 Pitt Street, Sydney central business district, City of Sydney, New South Wales, Australia

History
- Built: 1879
- Built for: William Mears

New South Wales Heritage Register
- Official name: Sugar House; Tricketts Hotel; Kings Hotel; Citibank
- Type: State heritage (built)
- Designated: 2 April 1999
- Reference no.: 417
- Type: Hotel
- Category: Commercial

Kings Hotel is a heritage-listed former pub and now commercial premises located at 138–140 Pitt Street, in the Sydney central business district, New South Wales, Australia. It was built from 1879. It is also known as Trickett's Hotel and Sugar House. It was added to the New South Wales State Heritage Register on 2 April 1999.

== History ==
Trade in sugar began within the first decades of settlement in Sydney. The site at 138–140 Pitt Street was for many years the city's first sugar exchange. In the late 1870s the present building was constructed as a hotel for a Sydney businessman, William Mears. It had four floors and sixteen rooms and was made of brick and shingle. It was first managed by Edward Trickett, a world champion sculler, and known as "Trickett's Hotel". It was later renamed "Kings Hotel". It was damaged by fire in April 1914, but reopened and operated as a hotel under that name until its closure on 30 June 1973.

It was adapted to commercial use after its closure and renamed Sugar House, and has had a range of tenancies and fitouts since that time. It was operating as a bridal store in the 1980s, later operated as a Citibank branch, and in 2018 is a Wittner Shoes store.

== Description ==
138–140 Pitt Street has architectural, historic and aesthetic significance as one of the best and most intact surviving examples of a Victorian Italianate city hotel that is located in a prominent position with a strong streetscape value both in the immediate locality and when seen along King Street. The building is of particular significance for its surviving four corner tower and cupola, and as one of the distinctive landmark features of the locality. The building has fine Italianate detailing and is a very well designed building from the period. Its group value is related to the adjoining buildings in King Street and the buildings on the opposite corners fronting Pitt Street Mall, which make this intersection a key heritage precinct in the city.

This building is part of a cohesive group of late 19th to early 20th century buildings and facades near the inter-section of Pitt and King Streets. The octagonal tower, capped with a domed cupola roof, forms a dramatic counterpoint to the nearby high rise buildings, and the building is a prominent corner landmark viewed from King Street against the backdrop of the MLC Centre. The building has four storeys of masonry construction and has a recessed corner tower and projecting angled bay windows to levels 1 and 2, topped with decorative iron work as in the main parapet. The building has excellent Victorian detailing, and is well designed and proportioned. The ground floor has been altered with new shopfronts (replaced several times) and new internal fitout. The upper floors retain much of their layout and detail but have been refitted with modern services including air conditioning and tower room.

This building is one of the best surviving examples of the corner hotel buildings which were a familiar feature of the streetscape of Sydney's business centre in the rapid growth years of the 19th century. Its small but robust facades have exerted a striking dominance in Pitt and King Sts for more than a century. It is of particular streetscape importance to the view eastward along King St, from which point it provides the only visual relief amid the new high-rise buildings on the north side of King St.

== Heritage listing ==
Trickett's Hotel was listed on the New South Wales State Heritage Register on 2 April 1999.
