= Joseph Skipsey =

English miner, author and poet (1832–1903)

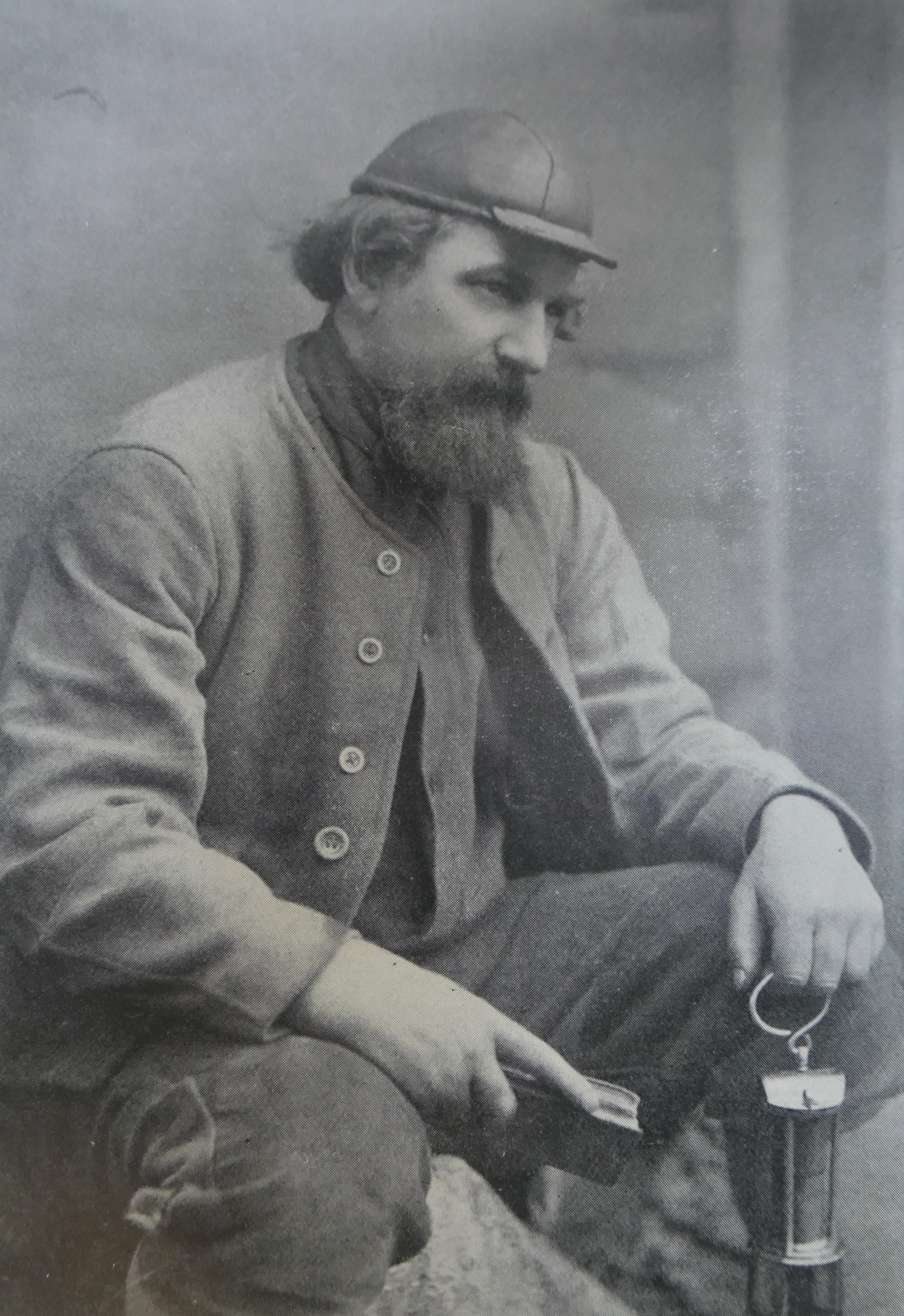
- Born: 17 March 1832; Percy Main, Tynemouth, England
- Died: 3 September 1903 (aged 71); Gateshead, England
- Occupations: miner, poet
- Spouse: Sarah Skipsey
- Writing career
- Genre: Realism
- Subject: Industrial conditions
- Notable work: 'The Hartley Calamity' '"Get Up!"' 'Mother Wept'

Joseph Skipsey (17 March 1832 – 3 September 1903) was a Northumbrian poet during the Victorian period and one of a number of literary coal miners to be known as 'The Pitman Poet'. Among his best known works is the ballad "The Hartley Calamity", which imagined the last hours of several of those trapped underground during the Hartley Colliery Disaster of January 1862. This devastating mining accident killed a total of 204 men and boys and remains England's most catastrophic pit disaster.

== Birth and early life ==
Skipsey was born in Percy Village (generally known after the name of the colliery Percy Main), in the Parish of Tynemouth on 17 March 1832. He was the eighth and final child of Cuthbert, an overman at Percy Main Colliery, and Isabella Skipsey.

Skipsey's life was touched by tragedy at an early age when his father, Cuthbert, was shot dead on 8 July 1832. In the wake of a long and bitter miners' strike, tensions in the Great Northern Coalfield were running high and on the Sunday evening, an affray occurred between a group of miners and armed special constables. Cuthbert Skipsey, a man of influence within the community, stepped forward in an attempt to defuse the situation. One of the special constables, George Weddell, pushed him away and shot him with his pistol, Cuthbert died immediately. Weddell was arrested, tried, found guilty of manslaughter, and sentenced to six months hard labour.

Like many children of that era, Skipsey started work in the local pit at the age of seven as a trapper. In order to break the boredom of the long hours in darkness, Skipsey taught himself to read and write by copying the text from discarded newspapers, adverts, playbills and other printed materials in chalk onto the wooden door he worked at. As his abilities grew Skipsey began, like many other working-class writers, to read canonical writers and was deeply influenced by Shakespeare, Robert Burns, John Milton and Goethe, with Milton's Paradise Lost having a profound influence over him. In an interview he gave to The Pall Mall Gazette in 1889, Skipsey told the newspaper that his first attempts at creating verse came when the older boys in the pit would sing incomplete versions of popular songs. Feeling frustration at these half-remembered songs, Skipsey would fill them out with his own words to match the rhythms and the rhymes he picked up. From here he began to write his own verses and poems before finally committing them to paper and, ultimately, to print.

== Marriage and family ==
In 1852 he walked to London in his search for work and found employment there on the railways. It was here that he met his bride-to-be, his landlady Sarah Ann Fendley. They returned North and he found a job at Choppington, and then Pembroke Colliery, near Sunderland.

Skipsey married Sarah, from Watlington, Norfolk, in December 1868. They had five sons (including Joseph b. 1869 and Cuthbert b. 1872) and three daughters (including Elizabeth Ann b. 1860 and who was living at Harraton at the time of her father's death). The three named children were the only ones to outlive their father.

== Later life ==
His first volume of his own works was published in Durham in 1858, a copy of which came to the attention of James Thomas Clephan, at that time editor of the Gateshead Observer, a relatively new newspaper and the first in Gateshead. When told by Skipsey of his dire situation, Clephan obtained a job for him at Hawks, Crawshay and Sons ironworks in Gateshead.

Following the death of one of his children, Skipsey moved to Newcastle in 1863 and became an assistant Librarian at the Literary and Philosophical Society of Newcastle upon Tyne for a short time. The job did not seem to suit him and, as the pay was poor, he returned to working in the pits, eventually settling at Backworth, where he remained until 1882.

On the death of three of his children within the space of a month, he wrote in the family bible: "On October 16th my son Cuthbert died in his fourteenth year, on the 24th of the same month so did my little Emma 1 year and 9 months old and the 30th our dear Harriet in her seventh year leaving us with our Elizabeth Ann Pringle only. The children died from scarletina. Let me say that three more lovely and affectionate children were never born in this world. Their loss has bowed their parents head down to dust of our reflections and their deaths have enlikened the belief that the dear jewels were wrongly treated. Joseph Skipsey. March 8th 1869. Also William – he was killed by a waggon on the Tyne Main Way near Gateshead on 7 September 1860."

Following the publication of his A Book of Miscellaneous Lyrics (1878), Skipsey's work came (via the efforts of a local literary figure) to the appreciative attention of Dante Gabriel Rossetti and, in 1880, he travelled to London to meet Rossetti. During this visit, Skipsey was introduced to many of the leading cultural figures of the nineteenth-century, including most notably Edward Burne-Jones. Following this trip to London, and through the efforts of Burne-Jones, Skipsey was awarded a small annual pension from the Royal Bounty Fund for his services to literature by William Gladstone.

By 1882 he was 50 years old and starting to feel his age, and so when a position of caretaker became vacant at a new Board School at Mill Lane, Newcastle, he applied for, and won the post. This school was successful and grew in size, until the workload became too much for him and his wife. In September 1888, he moved to the position of porter at the newly extended Armstrong College, but even this was hardly the job for a man of letters.

When, in 1889, the post of custodian of Shakespeare's Birthplace at Stratford-upon-Avon became vacant, Skipsey was one of 132 applicants. Supported by some of the most important cultural figures of the late-nineteenth century, including Alfred Tennyson, Robert Browning, Oscar Wilde, William Rossetti, William Morris, Edward Dowden, Edmund Gosse, and many others, Skipsey's application proved irresistible and he and his wife were appointed joint custodians. After less than two years he became disenchanted with the post which (he confided in a letter not to be opened until after his death) involved dealing with relics which had "no definite history" and having to "perpetuate error and fraud" on the visitors and general public. Skipsey's experience inspired Henry James' short story "The Birthplace".

He and his wife returned to Tyneside, where they lived off his pension, residing, in turns, at the homes of their surviving children.

== Death ==
Sarah Skipsey died on 9 August 1902, at the age of 73.

Joseph Skipsey died in the house of his son Cuthbert at 5 Kells Gardens, Low Fell, Gateshead, on 3 September 1903, aged 71. He was interred in Gateshead Cemetery. Two of his five sons and the eldest of three daughters survived him.

== Collections ==
- Lyrics (1858)
- Lyrics (1859)
- Poems, Songs, and Ballads (1862)
- The Collier Lad and other songs and ballads (1864)
- Poems (1871)
- A Book of Miscellaneous Lyrics (1878)
- A Book of Lyrics (1881)
- Carols from the Coalfields (1886)
- Carols, Songs, and Ballads (1888)
- Songs and Lyrics (1892)
- Selected Poems [of] Joseph Skipsey
- Joseph Skipsey: Selected Poems, R.K.R. Thornton; Chris Harrison; William Daniel McCumiskey (eds), Newcastle: The Rectory Press, 2014.

== Poems ==
Poems written by Skipsey:

- "Get Up!"
- The Hartley Calamity (1862) recounts the tragedy of the 204 men and boys (most of the male population of the village) who suffocated in the colliery after a six-day struggle to dig them out
- Willy to Jinny
- Kit never went down
- The Collier Lad
- Mother wept
- Mary of Crofton
- Jemmy stops lang at the fair – appears on page 12 of J. W. Swanston's Tyneside Songster

Skipsey also edited the following volumes of poetry for the "Canterbury Poets" series published by Walter Scott Publishing Co., for each of which he provided a biographical preface:

- The Poems, with Specimens of the Prose Writings, William Blake (1884)
- The Lyrics and minor poems of Percy Bysshe Shelley (1884)
- The Poems of S.T. Coleridge (1884)
- The Poetical Works of Edgar Allan Poe (1884)
- The Poetical Works of Robert Burns, Poems (1885)
- The Poetical Works of Robert Burns, Songs (1885)

== See also ==
- Geordie dialect words
- J. W. Swanston
- The Tyneside Songster by J. W. Swanston
