= Matthew Dryden =

Matthew Dryden (1842–1890) was an English singer-songwriter, radical, and factory worker. His most famous song is possibly "Perseveer".

== Life ==
Matthew Dryden was born in Belford, Northumberland in the spring of 1842. His father had an interest in a local coal mine, and therefore we would assume that they were financially "comfortable". His father died whilst Dryden was still in his teens, forcing him to find work.

He left Belford, travelled to Newcastle and found work in W.G. Armstrong & Company’s engineering factory, working there for the rest of his life, a period of over 30 years.

The great nine hours strike took place in 1871, and Matthew Dryden joined it, like almost all of his colleagues. He immediately started working for the cause, and organised concerts, the proceeds going to the strike funds.

Being a good singer of local, Irish and sentimental songs, he took part in many of them, and his rendering of Joe Wilson's songs and his own songs "Perseveer" and "Elliott, the Pegswood sculler" were very popular. When the strike ended he returned to Armstrongs.

He died at his home in Herbert Street in March 1890, age 46 after a lingering illness, leaving a widow and six children. He and his family were no longer "comfortably off" when he died.

== Works ==
These include:
"Perseveer" or "The Nine Oors Movement" to the tune of "Nelly Ray" - The literary merit is not great, but it suited the audiences of the day. It is written in Geordie dialect
"Elliott, the Pegswood sculler" - about William Elliott the sculler from Pegswood

== See also ==
- Geordie dialect words
