= William Joseph O'Connor =

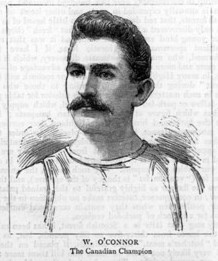
William Joseph O'Connor)

William Joseph O'Connor (4 May 1862 –23 November 1892) was a professional oarsman who attempted to win the World Sculling Championship. He was also a tavern-keeper and long-distance walker. He was born in Toronto, and grew up in the cities' Irish district of Corktown. His parents were Michael and Ellen O'Connor and he died unmarried in Toronto.

== Early Rowing ==
Inspired by Ned Hanlan Toronto's celebrated world champion, William Joseph O'Connor began rowing with the Irish-Catholic Don Rowing Club. In 1882, two years after the formation of the Canadian Association of Amateur Oarsmen, he raced for the first time, with Cornelius T. Enright in the association's in-rigged double sculls championship at Lachine, Quebec. The following year they won the double and O'Connor won the junior single. In 1884 he and Enright joined the more established Toronto Rowing Club and won the double shell championships in the Canada Association of Amateur Oarsmen, the National Association of Amateur Oarsmen of America, and the North Western Amateur Rowing Association (U.S.). In 1885 they repeated as CAAO champions and O'Connor won the single with the tactic that would become his trade mark, a rapid, explosive stroke at the start. These successes and reports of heavy wagering on them brought charges of professionalism against O'Connor and Enright. Exonerated by the CAAO, they were declared ineligible by the NAAO and so turned professional, staked by Toronto businessman Joseph Rogers.

== American Champion ==
In 1887, after a disappointing season in the double, O'Connor began to concentrate on the single. Within a short time he had won so many regattas in such fast times – his 19 minutes and 43 seconds for three miles with one turn in August 1888 was considered a world record – that few would accept his challenges for the one-on-one races which brought the greatest prizes and prestige. In only his second match race he had to row alone when prominent professional Wallace Ross of Saint John, New Brunswick, backed out at the last moment rather than be beaten by one "just out of the amateur ranks." O'Connor's response was "to try at the top of the heap." On 18 March 1888 he defeated (for a stake of $2,000) the Pacific coast champion, Henry Peterson, and then on 24 Nov. 1888 on the Potomac River in Washington, D.C., he beat, for $1,000, the American champion, John Teemer, who had twice taken the title from Hanlan. Both races were three miles. Torontonians rewarded O'Connor with a gala reception, a $1,000 cheque, and $300 in gold. After that, he continued to win regattas with such ease that, except for one defence against fellow Canadian Jake Gaudaur Snr. in San Francisco on 2 March 1889, no one challenged him. He remained American champion until his death.

== World Title Attempt ==
But O'Connor could not bring the World Sculling Championship, lost by Hanlan in 1884, back to Toronto. On 9 September 1889 on the historic Putney to Mortlake Championship Course on the Thames in London, England, he lost his challenge to the world champion, Henry Ernest Searle of Australia. The stake was £500 a side. It was reported that 100,000 people were on hand to see this match. O'Connor was first away and rowing a fast stroke soon had an advantage of half a length. However at the Crabtree, Searle had drawn up level and shortly afterwards was a length to the good. A little later O'Connor was showing signs of distress and after this the race was a procession. Searle won by about ten lengths in the fast time of 22m.42s. Searle died of typhoid fever shortly thereafter. The question of who should be the World Champion then arose and O'Connor felt he had some claim as he was the last challenger. This view had some support in England but promoters in Sydney, Australia claimed that Peter Kemp (rower) was the Champion on the grounds that he was the last living Champion. However this was on the understanding that Kemp would be open to challenges under the then normal process.

== In Australia ==
O'Connor travelled to Australia in 1890 in search of the title although he was unable to get a championship match. However he did have two races in Sydney with Jim Stanbury, who subsequently became World Champion. These were warm-up races for Stanbury before the latter's title race. In the first race just after the start the men fouled and O'Connor stopped paddling and claimed the foul and thereby the race. Unfortunately the umpire disallowed the claim. O'Connor was so unhappy with the result and attempted to prevent the payment of the stakes to Stanbury who then offered to row the race again. This was grudgingly accepted by O'Connor. The second race started with a huge spurt by the Canadian who initially got ahead of his opposition. However the Australian rowed steadily and overtook the leader to win fairly easily.

== Walking Record ==
In 1890 O'Connor took over the Sherman House in Toronto, the saloon of his brother, John J., who died unexpectedly in October. This new responsibility reduced his rowing appearances, but not the quality of his performances. Also, as an extension of the long walks he took in training, in December 1891 O'Connor set a new record for walking between Hamilton and Toronto, 9 hours and 26 minutes.

== Double Sculls World Champion ==
In August 1891 O'Connor and Ned Hanlan won the world championship in the double sculls before 30,000 spectators at Burlington Beach. The course was three miles long with a turn and the opposition were Jacob Gaudaur and John McKay. The stake was $1000 a side. The victors won by four plus lengths. In June 1892 they had a match at Eire, Pennsylvania. The course was three miles with turn against George H. Hosmer (USA) and Jacob Gaudaur. This time the purse was $1500. O'Connor and Hanlan won by two feet, after a tremendous spurt, in a time of 19m.55s. Just three months later in September they lost the Championship to the same pair at Ontario Beach.

== Death ==
O'Connor was 30 when he died of typhoid fever.
