= Thomas Haswell =

Thomas Haswell (1807–1889) was a Tynemouth-born schoolmaster, head master, songwriter and composer.

== Early life ==
=== Childhood and education ===
Thomas Haswell was born on 8 December 1807 to George Haswell and Alice (née) Corlett in Tynemouth, Northumberland. He had three brothers and five sisters, but at least five of these died in infancy. His father was a sailor.

Thomas started his minimal education in 1816 at North Shields Royal Jubilee School (which had only been open a matter of 4 years). He stayed there for three years before leaving to work as a helper to his father on the Tyne.

=== Early career ===
Shortly after he moved and was employed grinding glasses for a maker of "watch crystals", then as a grocer's errand boy before, in 1823, becoming apprenticed to a master painter. The little knowledge which he had gained at school made him desirous of more and he began to educate himself.

=== Musician and teacher ===
He gained a passion for music and joined the choir of Christ Church, where he learnt more under the old-fashioned choirmaster, Thomas Oxley. Haswell made such rapid progress that after only one year he joined a South Shields military band, of which shortly afterwards he was made the leader. He was soon scoring classical pieces for the band to perform and in no time he had learnt the pianoforte and organ. Despite having his full-time job as a painter's apprentice and his part-time work with the band and general interest in music, he did not neglect his general studies. He had decided that teaching was for him, and as soon as his apprenticeship ended he joined Westoe Lane National School, South Shields, as a student-teacher. Some years later he accepted a position of master of Trinity Church School, South Shields.

In 1838, the position of headmaster of his old school, the Royal Jubilee, fell vacant and he took the position. The school had only approximately 40 pupils and was in a dilapidated condition, with a poor and outdated system of teaching. As fast as he dared and finances allowed, he changed all this, introducing many academic subjects such as music, drawing and science whilst not forgetting the sports and swimming (at the council baths – and in the sea). A great respect grew between him and his pupils.

== Marriage and family ==
In the second year as headmaster, Thomas Haswell married Matilda Preston Armstrong (1821–1885) on 21 Sep 1840 in All Saints' Church, Newcastle upon Tyne and with her assistance his musical talent developed. They had seven children: Amy, Alice Clara, George Handel, Sarah Hannah, John Tom, Henry Crawford and William Corlett Haswell.

== Later life ==
About 1851 Thomas Haswell became organist at the parish church of North Shields, a job which encompassed choir training, choir practice, and frequent services. He retired in December 1886, aged 79. Haswell died on 8 December 1889 in Tynemouth, Northumberland and was buried possibly at Preston Cemetery, North Shields. Twelve months after his death, a portrait (painted by James Shotton) was presented to the Public Library at North Shields, paid for by colleagues and former pupils.

== Works ==
His musical compositions include:

- "The Life Brigade" – written for the Tynemouth Volunteer Life Brigade.
- "Love Lore" - composed for a Mechanics' Institute concert.
- A considerable amount of church music for Christ Church, North Shields.
- "Welcome to the Hungarian Exiles" - given words by James Stead Edington, it was first performed at a concert in aid of the exiles.
- The inaugural hymn for the opening of North Shields Mechanics' Institute which was given words by James Stead Edington.
- "Tynemouth" (or sometimes referred to as "Tynemouth Abbey") - set to words by John Stobbs. It became the school song in later times. This work appears in The Shields Garland.

== See also ==
Geordie dialect words
