= Thomas Dixon (autodidact) =

English literary correspondent (1831–1880)

Thomas Dixon (1831–1880) was a working class autodidact and literary correspondent of Sunderland in the north-east of England. A cork-cutter by trade, he lodged with a close friend of the head of the School of Art in Newcastle, William Bell Scott, and through this became acquainted with many of the artists later known as the Pre-Raphaelite Brotherhood and others in their circle, including Tennyson, Thomas Carlyle and Dante Gabriel Rossetti.

His correspondence with the Pre-Raphaelites, some of whom appear to have found him a nuisance, was important in bringing the Pitman Poet Joseph Skipsey to wider notice. He enjoyed a lengthy correspondence with John Ruskin between February and December 1867. Ruskin published his half of the correspondence, with excerpts from Dixon in the appendices, Time and Tyde by Weare and Tyne: Twenty-five Letters to a Working Man of Sunderland on the Laws of Work. The letters touched on themes of honesty in work, fairness and cooperation, in keeping with his essays engaging with John Stuart Mills, Adam Smith and Malthus.

He was widely read and a member of the Sunderland Literary and Philosophical Society. Though the recipient of many books as gifts from his correspondents, Dixon had few of them in his house, remarking that he saw no need for books as ornaments and that after reading and absorbing a book's contents, he would donate it to the local library.

He sat for many of the artists he corresponded with and a portrait of him by Alfred Dixon (no relation) is in the collection of Sunderland Museum and Winter Gardens.

At his death, Dixon had a substantial archive of letters, which he desired to be left to the town of Sunderland as a single collection with his books and art. Instead, his letters were split up and auctioned in the 1970s.
