= Ned Hanlan =

Canadian sculler, hotelier and alderman

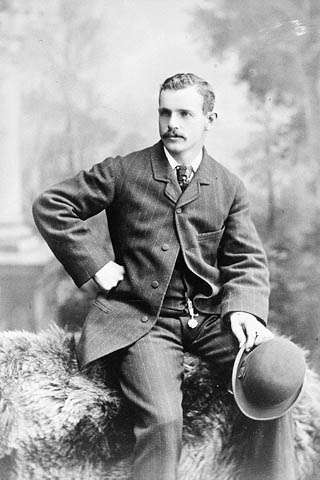
- Ned Hanlan, 1887
- Born: Edward Hanlan; 12 July 1855; Toronto, Canada West
- Died: 4 January 1908 (aged 52); Toronto, Ontario, Canada
- Resting place: Necropolis Cemetery, Toronto; 43°40′4.2″N 79°21′46.4″W
- Other name: Edward Hanlan (Hanlon)
- Height: 5 ft 8.75 in (1.75 m)
- Title: World champion sculler
- Term: 1880–1884
- Predecessor: Edward Trickett
- Successor: Bill Beach
- Spouse: Margaret Gordon Sutherland

Edward "Ned" Hanlan (12 July 1855 – 4 January 1908) was a Canadian professional sculler, hotelier, and alderman from Toronto, Ontario. He was the world sculling champion from 1880 to 1884. According to Rowing Canada Aviron, Hanlan is "widely regarded as Canada’s first individual sporting hero."

== Early life ==
Hanlan was born to Irish parents; one of two sons and two daughters. His mother was Mary Gibbs, his father, John, was first a fisherman and later a hotel keeper on the Toronto Islands. The Hanlan family originally lived at the east end of Toronto Island, but a severe storm in 1865 pushed their house into the harbour. It washed ashore near the north end of Gibraltar Point, at the island's west end. A few years later, Hanlan's father built a small hotel there, and the area started becoming known as Hanlan's Point, long before Hanlan became famous. Young Hanlan used to row several kilometres across the harbour to go to and from George Street public school, Toronto every day. He developed speed and strength by rowing his boat with freshly-caught fish to sell at market before other fishermen arrived to compete. By the time Hanlan was a teenager, he was competing in rowing events and he gained his first important success at the age of eighteen, when he became amateur champion of Toronto Bay.

== Rowing career ==
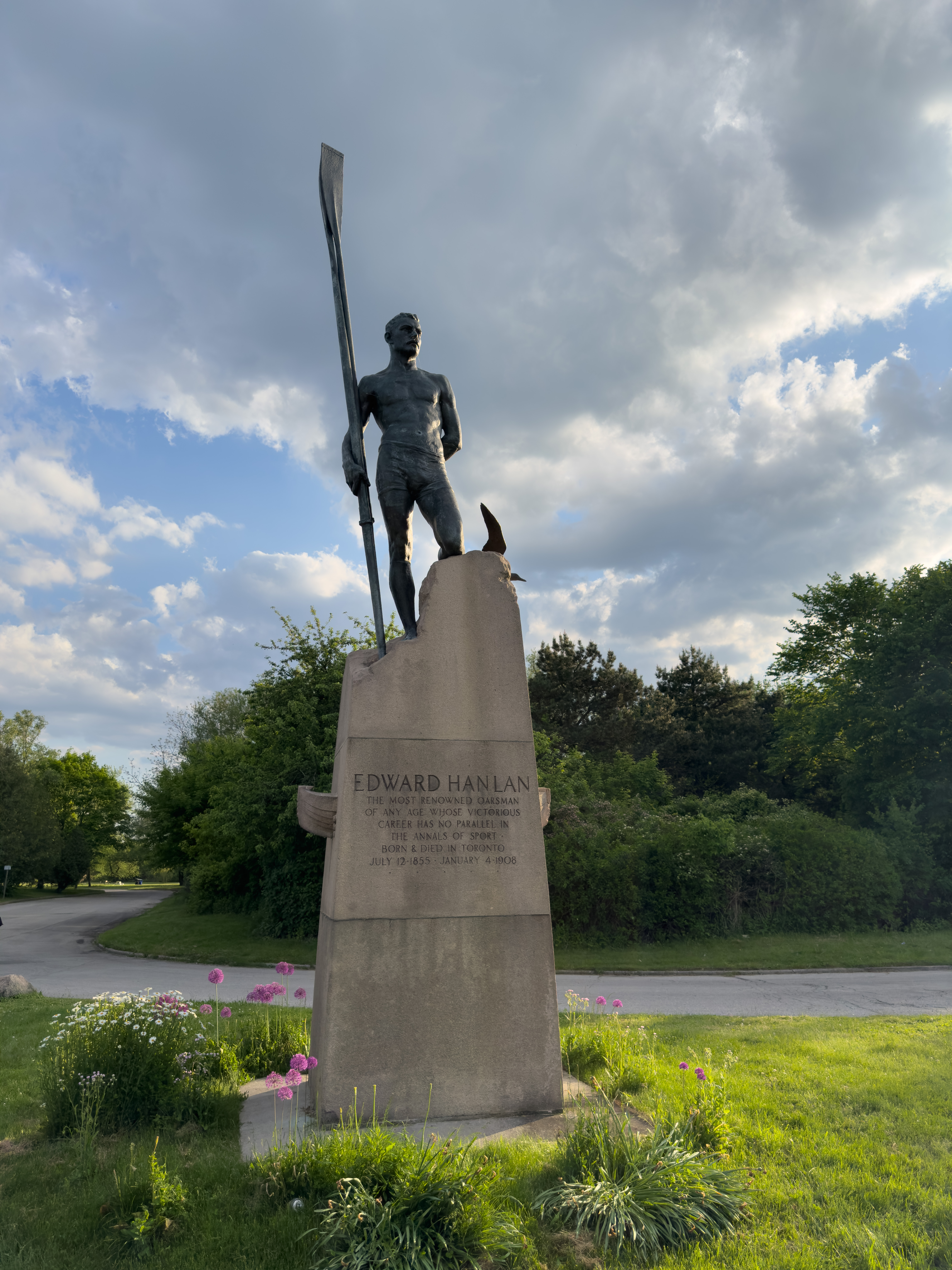
Ned Hanlan monument, sculpted by Emanuel Hahn, on the Toronto Islands

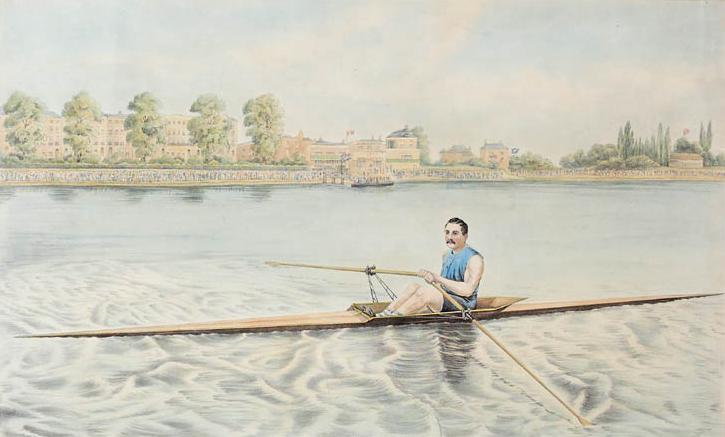
Edward Hanlan of Toronto – Champion Sculler of the World (George Rees, 1880)

He turned professional in c. 1874 / 5 and soon afterwards he beat all comers at the Centennial International Exhibition at Philadelphia in 1876. In 1877 he became champion sculler of Canada, followed by Champion sculler of the United States in 1878. That same year, Hanlan won the Dufferin Gold Medal. After further success in North America he decided to test his mettle against Europe and travelled to England in 1879 where, on 16 June 1879 he defeated the English champion, W. Elliott of Blyth, rowing the course from the Mansion House in Newcastle upon Tyne to the Scotswood Bridge on the River Tyne in the record time of 21 minutes 1 second. Ultimately he lost only six of his 300 races during his rowing career. He was the world sculling champion for five consecutive years from 1880 to 1884.

Unlike his English professional rivals, he used the slide simultaneously with the swing, kept his body well back, and held his arms straight long past the perpendicular before bending them, added strength being given by the skilful use of his great leg power.

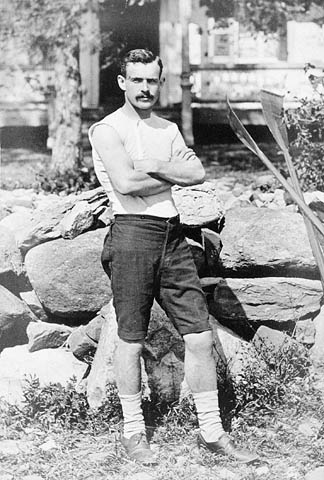
Ned Hanlan 1878

== World champion ==
With this triple crown the Hanlan Club disbanded, its mission accomplished. But the oarsman himself had one more goal, the World Championship, held by Australian Edward Trickett. On 15 November 1880 he raced him on the River Thames's historic Putney to Mortlake course and, with 100,000 spectators lining the banks, won easily. He was so in command that in a good humoured way he made great sport of his opponent:

The young champion, in order to relieve the monotony of the proceedings, had lain himself down flat on his back. In this position he rested until Trickett got within a length and a half of him, when he sprung up laughing and dashed off into fast sculling again.

In doing so he became Canada's first world sporting champion in an individual or singles event. He rowed a boat built by George Warin of Toronto. News of Hanlan's success, spread by telegraph and newspaper, touched off a rare moment of communion among English-speaking Canadians. His victory also enriched "hundreds" of Ontarians "from Judges to peanut vendors" (Toronto Globe) who had backed him with cabled wagers.

== Defending the title ==
Hanlan was an active champion, accepting frequent challenges and racing often against the larger fields of non-title regattas. Defending his United States title against the latest American hope was particularly lucrative. In 1878 he had won an unprecedented $10,000 by defeating Charles Edward Courtney at Lachine, Que. Two years later Hanlan beat him again in Washington, D.C., winning $6,000. Although it was the champion's prerogative to veto the site of any match, he never insisted on home advantage. Three months after he trounced Trickett he defended his world title against another Australian, Elias C. Laycock, on the Thames.

In 1882 he returned to beat Englishman R. W. Boyd and, a month later, Trickett again. The following year, (1883) after a bout with typhoid which had led to reports of his death, he turned back challenges in the United States from James Kennedy, an American, and Wallace Ross. There is some debate about these two races as they are not recorded in the list of Championship Races such as the one published in 1930 by the British Rowing Almanac nor in other publications. There is no doubt that the races took place. The Kennedy match was for $2500 a side and was rowed in Boston. Wallace Ross had beaten Hanlan in an earlier non-title match and thus claimed to be the unofficial World Champion. To try to make it official Ross challenged Hanlan and the match took place in New York. Hanlan won and made a record time in the process by taking fifty seconds off the previous best time for the four mile course. These two matches were the only World Championship matches ever held in the US, other than one in 1932. In 1884 Hanlan again beat Laycock, this time on the Nepean River, in New South Wales. Strangely enough, of the twelve Championship races that Hanlan rowed none of them was raced in Canada. For further details of his Championship races see World Sculling Championship.

== Sculling style ==
Hanlan's genius was a superbly efficient stroke – he was the father of the modern technique. He took full advantage of the sliding seat (eventually patented by his coach George Warin in 1882), not only to obtain greater reach but to drive with the large muscles of the legs in a coordinated, fluid motion so that the power of his whole body was marshalled into every stroke. This movement was no easy task in a frail, tipsy shell. Novices were discouraged from employing the slider for many years, and many of his rivals who did use it pulled primarily with their arms. Hanlan, who was only 5 feet 8 3/4 inches tall, weighed a mere 150 pounds in most of his races, yet his powerful stroke enabled him to beat larger, stronger men. While he rarely rowed at more than 36 strokes per minute, compared with as many as 42 for his rivals, he usually led from the start, often toying with opponents. During his championship race against Morris he slowed down, and twice stopped altogether, to enable the American to make a race of it; he still won by three lengths. He competed with icy calm and, although the term had yet to be coined, was a master at "psyching out" opponents with timely taunts. He had no qualms about humiliating those he disliked. When racing the arrogant Trickett he chatted with spectators and blew them kisses, stopped and waited, faked a collapse, and rowed in zigzags while the Australian laboured in his wake. On one occasion Hanlan crossed the line so far in front that he leisurely rowed back to his opponent and then beat him to the finish line a second time.

== Championship loss ==
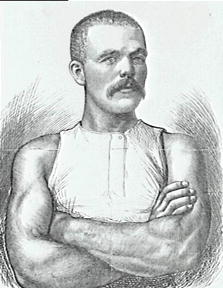
Bill Beach, Champion Sculler of the World 1884-1887

Hanlan's main occupation for many years continued to be rowing. He held his world title until 16 August 1884, when he was defeated by Australian Bill Beach on the Parramatta River near Sydney. Hanlan's friends put the blame for the loss on a second bout with typhoid, the debilitating effects of almost eight months of foreign travel, and a near collision during the race with a chartered steamer, but the muscular blacksmith was an exceptional opponent. Unlike Hanlan's other challengers, Beach had mastered the use of the sliding seat; he also outweighed the defending champion by 50 pounds. Hanlan stayed another seven months for a rematch but Beach beat him then, and again in 1887. Returning the following year to race Beach's successor, Peter Kemp, Hanlan was twice unsuccessful. The next Canadian to hold the world championship would be Jake Gaudaur Snr., in 1896.

Despite having lost his American title to John Teemer in 1885, Hanlan was far from finished. Although he chose opponents with increasing care, he raced with success and drew large crowds to his exhibitions for another decade. In 1891 he teamed up with fellow Torontonian (and new American champion) William Joseph O'Connor* to win the American doubles championship, only to lose it the following year to Gaudaur and an American, George Hosmer. After O'Connor died in 1892, Hanlan raced with other partners but never again took a major doubles title. During his career he won more than 300 races, including exhibitions, and suffered fewer than a dozen defeats. As befits a sporting hero Hanlan was affable, handsome, hard-working, and generally honest. (After a brief scrape with the law – he escaped arrest for bootlegging outside his father's hotel in 1876 by rowing out to a cross-lake ferry, only to return in glory following his victory in Philadelphia – he managed to avoid the scandals which plagued his rivals.) When newspapers in the United States claimed him as an American because of his successes there, he stressed his Canadian identity. His confident victories against the best rowers from the United States and Britain seemed to confirm the wisdom of the attempt to build a new northern nation, and the vitality of its rising cities and towns. The Globe called him Canada's best immigration agent.

Hanlan was involved in twelve championship races with seven wins and five losses. Strangely, none of these races were in Canada. For further details of the World Title races that Hanlan was involved in see World Sculling Championship.

Diminutive compared to his competition at the height of 5 feet 8.75 inches (1.7 m) and normal race weight of 150 pounds (68.0 kg) and familiar blue shirt, Hanlan was called "the boy in blue". Actor Nicolas Cage portrayed Hanlan in the 1986 film The Boy in Blue. He married on 19 December 1877 Margaret Gordon Sutherland of Pictou, Nova Scotia; they had two sons and six daughters. His elder son, Edward Gordon Hanlan, served as a lieutenant in the Royal Flying Corps and died in a flying accident in England in 1917.

== Later life ==
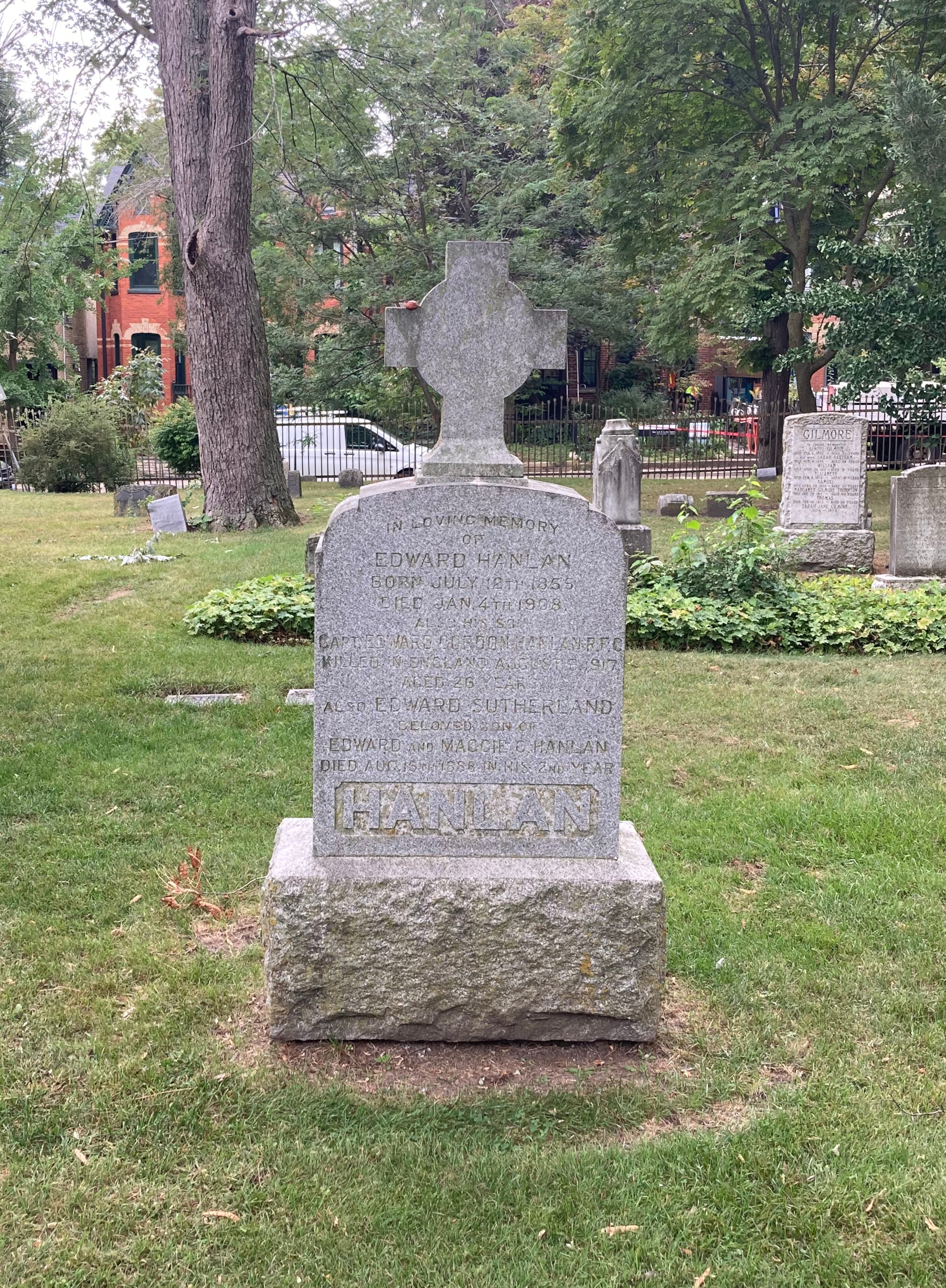
Hanlan's grave at Toronto Necropolis

Following his career as an athlete, Hanlan became a hotelier like his father, and eventually became involved in municipal politics as an alderman of Toronto. He was the first head coach of the University of Toronto Rowing Club in 1897. In 1900, he decided to leave and coach the crew of Columbia University, New York for some years. Hanlan died of pneumonia at age 52. Ten thousand Torontonians thronged to pay their final respects at the church where his body lay in state. He was buried at Toronto Necropolis.

== Legacy ==
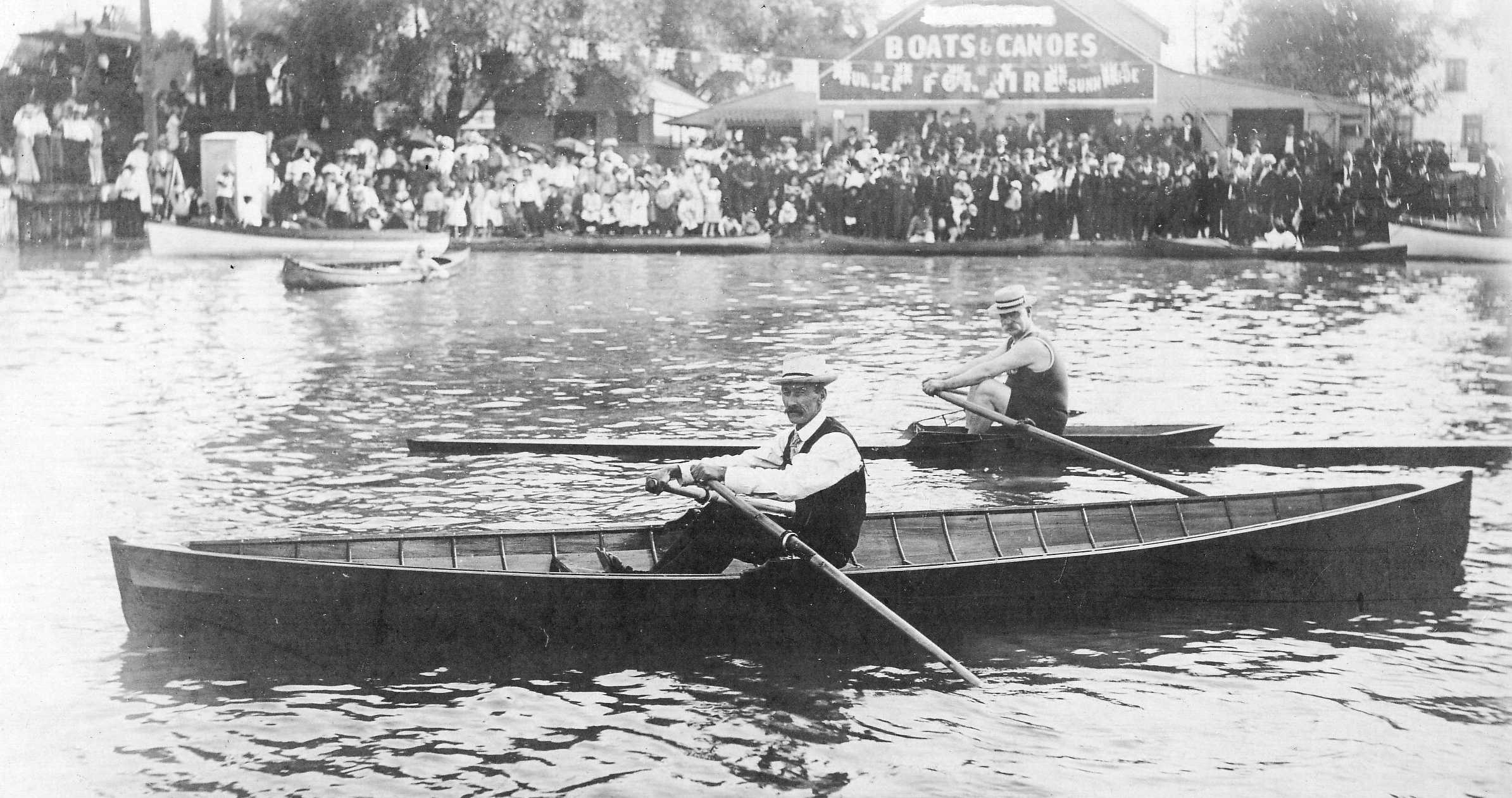
On Humber River with O L Hicks (near boat) 1904

Toronto, New South Wales, Australia was named after Toronto, Ontario, in honour of Edward Hanlan. Hanlan's visit to Australia in 1884 coincided with the opening of the new subdivision. The area's subdividers, the Excelsior Company, named the land in honour of Hanlan's visit.

In 1926, a larger-than-life bronze statue of a mustachioed, muscular, shirtless Hanlan, shown clad in his rowing trunks, was unveiled on the grounds of the Canadian National Exhibition. This monument was relocated to a site near the ferry dock at Hanlan's Point in 2004. In 1980, a postage stamp was issued in his honour commemorating the centenary of his first world championship. In addition, the steamboat Ned Hanlan is named after him.

A community in Mississauga along Britannia Road between Tomken and Dixie Roads was named for Hanlan, as well as Hanlan Public School (closed 1957), but all that remains of the area's name is Hanlan Reservoir and Pumping Station.

Hanlan Road in Vaughan, Ontario is named after him. Gaudaur Road, named after a fellow World Champion, runs off Hanlan Road. A road in Surfer's Paradise, Australia is also named after Hanlan.

Ned Hanlan was inducted into the Ontario Sports Hall of Fame in 2002.

== Racing record ==
=== Single sculls ===
Date (DMY)	Event	Place or Course	Length	Opposition	Stake	Win/Lose	Comments
1874	Local Championship	Burlington Bay	-	Thomas Louden	-	w	First professional race
1875	-	Toronto Bay	-	Thomas Louden	$100 a side	w	in summer
1875	Governor General's Medal	Toronto	2 miles	Louden & Douglas	-	w	
1876	-	-	-	James Douglas		w	in spring
1876	-	-	-	William McKay	-	w	in spring
12 Aug 1876	Championship of Ontario	-	-	McKen	-	w	
1876	International Centennial Regatta	Philadelphia	3 miles	Many top men	-	w	Won several heats also
13 Jun 1876	match	Silver Lake, Boston	-	Fred Plaisted	-	l	
26 Jun 1877		Silver Lake, Boston	-	Johnston & Driscoll	-	w	
4 Jul 1877	Regatta	Charles River, Boston	-	Fred Plaisted	-	l	Fouled opponent
15 Oct 1877	Match	St John, N.B.	5 miles	Wallace Ross	$1000 a side	w	Championship of British Provinces (i.e. Canada)
15 May 1878	Match	Toronto Bay	2 miles	Fred Plaisted	$2000	w	Canadian Championship
20 Jun 1878	Championship of USA	Hulton Course, Pittsburgh	5 miles with turn	Evan Morris	-	w	American Champion
1 Jul 1878	Regatta	Brockville	4 miles with turn	7 others	-	w	
4 Jul 1878	Regatta	Cape Vincent	-	Various	-	w	
31 Jul 1878	Kennebecasis	St John N.B.	5 miles with turn	Wallace Ross	$2000	w	Canadian Championship. Ross fell out of his boat
12 Aug 1878	Barrie Regatta	-	-	9 others	-	w	
3 Oct 1878	Lachine	Canada	5 miles	Charles E. Courtney	$8000	w	won easily. US Championship
8 May 1879	Match	Tyne UK	3m, 760yds	John Hawdon	£400	w	
16 Jun 1879	Championship of England	Tyne	3m, 760yds	William Elliott (rower)	£200 a side	w	Plus Sportsman's Challenge Cup
18 Aug 1879	Barrie Regatta	-	-	Various	-	l	Said to be out of condition
October 1879	US Title	Chatauqua Lake	5 miles with turn	Charles E. Courtney	$6,000	w	"The Fixed Match" US Championship. Stake Unpaid.
19 May 1880	-	Potomac River, Washington	-	Charles E. Courtney	-	w	US Championship
26 May 1880	-	Potomac River	-	James Riley		w	US Championship
17 Jun 1880	"Hop Bitters" Regatta	Rhode Island	4 miles with turn	Various	$5000	l	won some heats
15 Nov 1880	World Title	Thames UK	4.25 miles	Edward Trickett	£400	w	World Champion plus English Championship
14 Feb 1881	World Title	Thames	4.25 miles	Elias C. Laycock	£500 a side	w	And Championship of England also
3 Apr 1882	World Title	Tyne	3m, 760yds	Robert Boyd		w	
1 May 1882	World Title	Thames	4.25 miles	Edward Trickett		w	
30 May 1883	World Title	Boston	3 miles	John A Kennedy		w	
18 Jul 1883	World Title	New York	4 miles	Wallace Ross		w	
22 May 1884	World Title	Nepean, Aust		Elias C. Laycock		w	
16 Aug 1884	World Title	Parramatta Sydney	3.25 miles	Bill Beach	£500 a side	l	Loss of World Title
7 Feb 1885	Match	Parramatta Sydney	3.25 miles	Tom Clifford		w	
28 May 1885	World Title	Parramatta Sydney	3.25 miles	Bill Beach	£500 a side	l	
23 Jul 1885	Match	Cazenovia Lake, Syracuse	2.5 miles	George Hosmer	-	w	
7 Sep 1885	3-way match	Sheephead Bay	3 miles with turn	Ross and Lee		w	
24 Oct 1885	US Title	Albany	3 miles with turn	John Teemer		l	Loss of US Championship
25 Jun 1886	Match	Lake St Joseph (Quebec)	3 miles with turn	George Hosmer	$1500	w	
1 Jul 1886	Match	Richelien River (St Johns)	3 miles with turn	Wallace Ross	$3000	w	Won by about six inches.
9 Aug 1886	Regatta	Nantasket Beach	3 miles with turn	Hosmer, James A. Ten Eyck, J McKay		w	won easily.
1 Sep 1886	Match	Jamaica Bay	3 miles	Charles E. Courtney		w	record time claimed, but disputed.
30 May 1887	US Title	New York	-	Jacob Gaudaur		l	
23 Jul 1887	US Title	New York	3 miles with turn	Jacob Gaudaur	$1000 a side	w	US Championship regained but farcial result as Gaudaur failed to race properly.
13 Aug 1887	US Title	Toronto		John Teemer		l	US Title lost (again)
26 Nov 1887	World Title	Parramatta Sydney	3.25 miles	Bill Beach		l	
5 May 1888	World Title	Parramatta Sydney	3.25 miles	Peter Kemp (rower)	£500 a side	l	
13 Jun 1888	Match	Rockhampton	3 miles	Edward Trickett		w	
28 Sep 1888	World Title	Parramatta Sydney	3.25 miles	Peter Kemp (rower)	£500 a side	l	
27 Nov 1888	Match	Parramatta Sydney	3.25 miles	Bill Beach	£500 a side	l	
1 Sep 1892	Match	Toronto	2 miles	Charles Stephenson (rower)	-	w	
24 Jul 1893	Match	Orillia, Ontario	3 miles	Jacob Gaudaur		l	about his major last race.

=== Double sculls ===
Although Hanlan mainly raced in the single sculls he sometimes partnered another person to race double sculls. At least twice Hanlan became the joint holder of the Double Sculls World Championship title. The following are some of his double sculls races.

Date (DMY)	Event	Partner	Place or Course	Length	Opposition	Stake	Win/Lose	Comments
5 Jun 1886	Hanlan Regatta	George Lee	Toronto	3 miles with turn	George Hosmer & John McKay	-	w	by 4 lengths, in 26m.18s.
8 Aug 1891	World Championship	William Joseph O'Connor	Hamilton, Ontario	3 miles with turn	Jacob Gaudaur & John McKay	$1000 a side	w	by 4+ lengths, in 18m.26.5s.
23 Jun 1892	World Championship	William Joseph O'Connor	Eire, Pennsylvania	3 miles with turn	George Hosmer & Jacob Gaudaur	$1500	w	won by two feet in 19m.55s.
5 Sep 1892	World Championship	William Joseph O'Connor	Ontario Beach	3 miles with 3 turns	George Hosmer & Jacob Gaudaur	$1500	l	loss of Championship
