= Wallace Ross (rower) =

Wallace Ross (20 February 1857 – 26 November 1895) was a professional rower who was considered to be the greatest sculler to come out of Saint John, Canada. He was a champion who nearly won the World Champion single sculls title.

== Early life ==
Wallace Ross was born in Memramcook, New Brunswick, British North America on 20 February 1857. He went to Saint John as a young teenager looking for work and he gained employment with a boatman who quickly saw the potential of the young man. Soon he was racing other young men and beating them. On July 10, 1873, Ross took on his first rowing contest, worth $50, racing against John Harding. It took place at the Saint John Harbour, from the Long wharf to and around the Beacon Light and back again, and Ross emerged victorious. His first big race was in August 1873 at the Coronation Regatta where he raced, and lost, to Alex Brayley for the Championship of New Brunswick. By 1876 he had improved enough to beat Brayley twice; once at a harbour regatta, the second in June on the Kennebecasis River. This race was over five miles with a turn n the middle and a stake of $500 a side. Ross won well and on the strength of this challenged Ned Hanlan who was the champion of Canada and the United States. Hanlan ignored this challenge so Ross claimed to be the Canadian Champion by default; a claim not necessarily accepted by everyone. He was described as being a big strapping fellow who was over six feet tall and weighed 185 pounds. Another match was subsequently arranged against Brayley, this time for $1000 a side. Ross sculled the course in a time ninety seconds under the previous record which convinced his backers that they had a very fast man; possibly the fastest in North America.

== 1877–1879 ==
The following year (1877) Ross defeated Fred Plaisted of Boston over a three-mile course. He then rowed and won against Warren Smith at $100 a side for the championship of the Marine Provinces. He again challenged Hanlan and after some protracted negotiations the match for the Championship of Canada, at $1000 a side, was finally set down for October 1877 and the location was Toronto Bay. It was over a five-mile course with a turn. Hanlan had perfected the use of the sliding seat and swivel row-lock and these gave him a huge advantage over his competitor who was still using the fixed seat. At the start Hanlan went ahead and stayed in front to the turn and then increased his lead all the way to the line to finish very comfortably. Needless to say, Ross was far from pleased. He still believed he could beat Hanlan and in 1878 again arranged another match. This match was also over five miles. Not long after the start, Ross 'caught a crab' and, unusually, was flung into the water. Hanlan then rowed the course at a very easy pace to win. During 1879 Ross went to England, the centre of professional sculling, to get some training where his strength and style were greatly admired. He only had one race against in England and he was the winner on this occasion. He returned to Canada with renewed hope and a match was arranged against Warren Smith of Halifax. The race was run in that city in September 1879 and a number of Ross's backers were confident of recouping some of their past losses and placed large bets on their man. Unfortunately their confidence was misplaced and Smith crossed the line first. Another loss shortly afterwards to an American was almost enough for his backers to believe he was not up to sculling at that level and abandon him.

== 1880–1884 ==
In June 1880 the Hop Bitters company sponsored a regatta at Rhode Island. The sculling race had very attractive prizes which attracted most of the world's top scullers. It was estimated that 100,000 people were on and to watch the big event. It was a fleet race rather than the more usual match race between professional scullers. At the gun Hanlan went to an early lead with Ross in fourth place. The leaders rushed on and at the three miles point Ross was no further ahead in position but also no further behind. However, from this point on the men in front had nearly worn themselves out because of the fast pace and were tiring but Ross was able to put in strokes of terrific force and gradually overtake each of the other men in turn. At the finish he was more than half a minute ahead of the next man. For his efforts he took home $3000 and a large silver cup. The victory had been unexpected and there were great celebrations in St John. Despite the loss, Hanlan still claimed to be the best in the world and proved his claim by beating Edward Trickett on the Thames in November 1880 to become the actual Single Sculls World Champion. Ross travelled to England and at the end of the year raced Trickett at $1000 a side. For the second time in succession the former World Champion Trickett lost to a Canadian.

In the 1881 season, during September, the city of Toronto hosted a large international regatta which attracted most of the top scullers of the day, not only from Canada but also the States and England. Hanlan and Ross were the early favourites but Hanlan withdrew as he was out of condition. This left Ross as the most favoured man by the gamblers followed by Charles E. Courtney the American Champion. At the start of the race Ross got away fast and soon was in the lead. Although he was chased by very determined men he stayed in front for the whole race and crossed the line first. This was the pinnacle of the career for Ross and he was acclaimed by many as the world champion although this was unofficial.

Hanlan as official Champion was unhappy with this state of affairs and promptly challenged Ross to a race for the title. The challenge was accepted but the two men, or their agents, could not agree terms and the race did not proceed. The following season another match was arranged to be run in July on a river in Winnipeg but at the last minute Hanlan pulled out. Ross was most upset especially as Hanlan immediately offered to row any man over two miles for between one and two thousand dollars a side. Ross was of the opinion that Hanlan did not want to row him and said as much. Finally in July 1883 the long-awaited match between these two men for the World Title took place at Ogdensburg, New York. This race was over four miles. Hanlan won in the record time of 27m.57.5s and he crossed the line a full minute ahead of Ross who did not row poorly but was simply beaten on the day. Hanlan had one more defence of his Title before losing it to Bill Beach in 1884. Beach had several defences as well before he accepted a challenge from Ross for the Title. Ross still believed he was good enough to be the World Champion. The race was run in September 1886 on the Thames on the famous Championship Course between Putney and Mortlake. The result was never in doubt with Beach crossing the line well in front. See also World Sculling Championship for details of other races.

== Later life ==
Although this was not quite the end of Ross as sculler, he was nearing the end of his career. However, in February 1888 he won the English Sculling Championship but later he slipped out of the top tier of rowers and retired not long after. He later settled in England and found worldwide fame as a swordsman. His exhibitions of swordsmanship with a variety of weapons drew much admiration. Ross died in London on the 26 November 1895.
