= Elias C. Laycock =

Australian rower

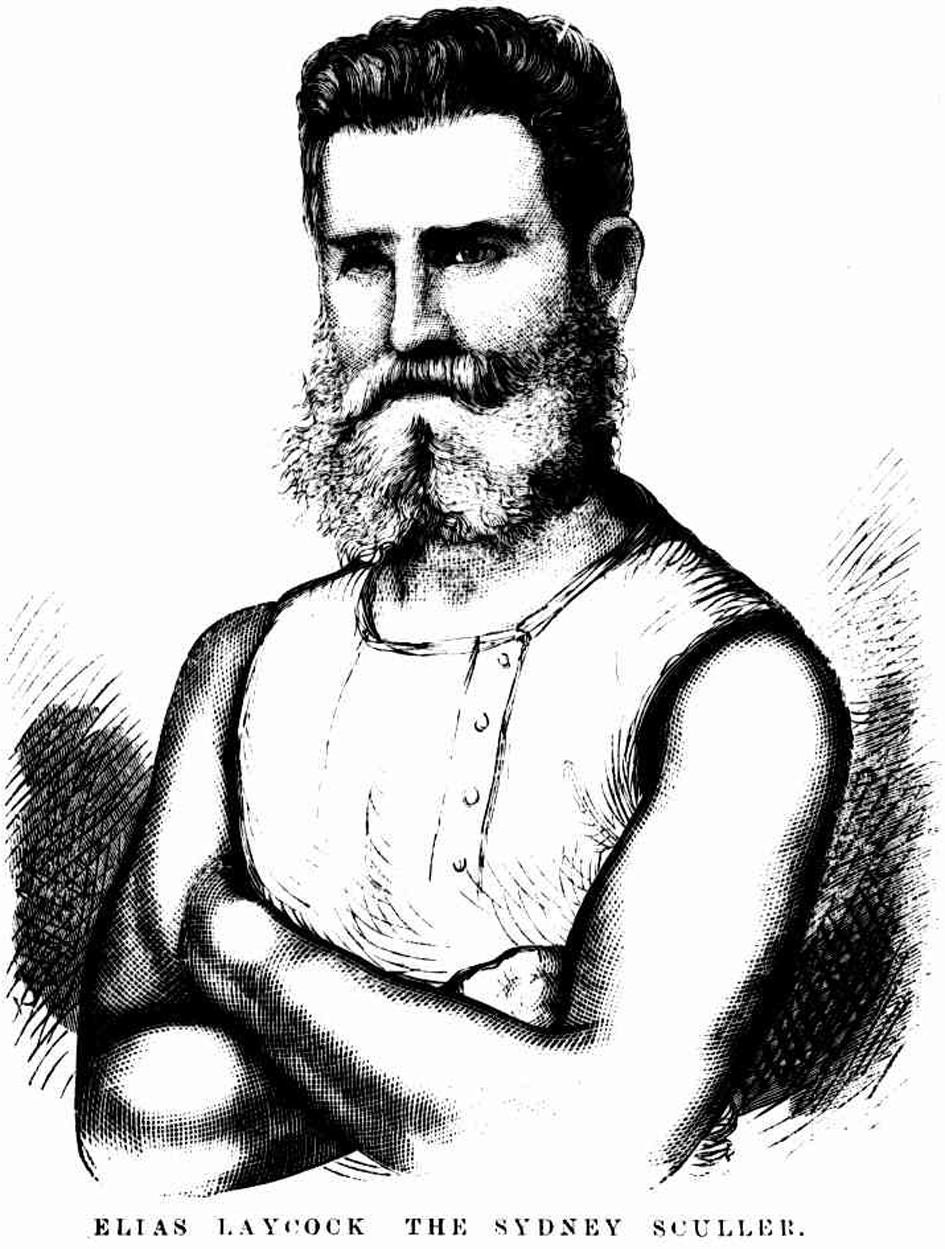
- Born: Elias Connell Laycock; 8 May 1845; Sydney, New South Wales, Australia
- Died: 29 May 1938 (aged 93); Cronulla, New South Wales, Australia
- Occupation: sculler

Elias Connell Laycock (8 May 1845 – 29 May 1938) was an Australian competitive rower who three times tried to become the World Sculling Champion.

== Early life ==
Elias Laycock was born in Pitt Street in Sydney, New South Wales. He attended boarding school at Newtown for a few years then changed to the Cleveland House School in Sydney's Cleveland Paddocks district. Laycock proceeded to work at various jobs after his father's theatre was destroyed by fire during a point in which the building was left uninsured for several days. Laycock worked as a sailor in England, a gold miner near the Gulf of Carpentaria, a cattle stockman at Gippsland, Victoria, a sailor again within Australia, then another gold mining stint.

== Rowing career ==
Laycock began sculling in 1874 with his first regatta appearance on the Clarence River at Grafton. Michael Rush won that competition and its prize of £200 with Edward Trickett in second place while Laycock finished third. Later that year, Laycock trailed Trickett at the Balmain Regatta.

In 1875, Laycock competed again at Clarence River this time winning the regatta over Rush. That September, Trickett defeated Laycock at a match on the Parramatta River in Sydney. Laycock also placed second that November in a re-match with Trickett at the Balmain regatta. Laycock won the Balmain regatta the following year.

On 26 January 1877, Trickett won over Laycock at an annual regatta in Sydney which commemorates the anniversary of the colonisation of Australia. Later that year, Laycock won the Balmain regatta a second time. Around this time, he obtained a position in charge of a quarantine station at Shark Island.

In July 1878, Laycock rowed G. Solomon in heavy boats for £60. A previous race between the two scullers resulted in a draw, consequent upon a foul. Laycock, however, led from the start and won easily.

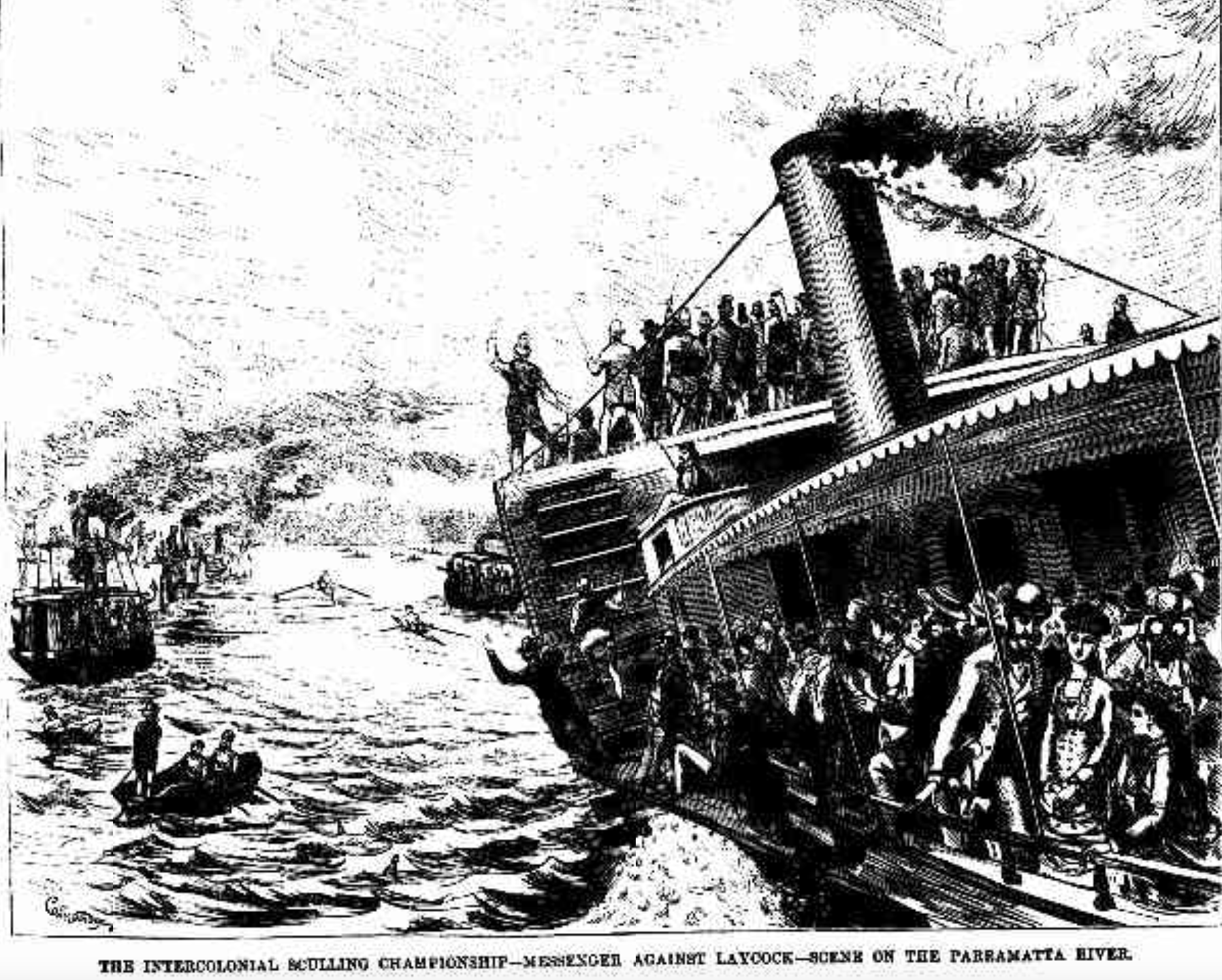
Charles Messenger hindered by paddle steamer

On 14 September 1878, Laycock was matched against Charles A. Messenger, for £100 a side and the "Championship of the World". Laycock won that contest on the Parramatta River after a close race, marred by confusion caused by steamers at the finish.

He is described by a commentator that day as follows:-

Elias Laycock is a true son of the soil, and a splendid specimen of humanity, standing over 6 feet 2 inches and lifting the beam at 12st10lbs.

On 1 January 1879, Laycock was defeated in the watermen's skiff race at Newcastle, principally due to being handicapped by a very heavy boat. At the National Anniversary Regatta on 26 January 1879 in the professional sculls, Laycock beat Trickett and then created consternation by showing Trickett, then world champion, the right direction to the winning post. Next for Laycock was a match with Rush on the Parramatta River the following April. The stakes were £100, and Laycock won that race by a length and a half. On 30 August 1879, Trickett won in another match with Laycock at the Parramatta River for £200 a side. A week later, Laycock defeated Rush again. At Balmain that year, on 9 November, Laycock placed third against Tricket and Edwards in the professional sculls.

=== World Title Match ===
Laycock raced Trickett on 29 August 1879 for the latter's world Title. This race for £200 a side had the extra dimension in that the winner was to be chosen to represent New South Wales against Ned Hanlan who was then champion of Great Britain and the United States. The course was again on the Parramatta River but for a distance of about 3.75 miles (6.04 km). Laycock took an early lead but by four hundred yards Trickett had passed him and then won by 15 to 18 lengths. The time was 22m.38s which was then the second best time recorded in Australia. Trickett had used the recent invention of swivel rowlocks.

At the Anniversary Regatta at Sydney on 26 January 1880, Laycock won the silver belt and gold medal which represented the title of Champion of Australia. He defeated McLeer and Sullivan who finished second and third respectively.

Laycock was then challenged by Pearce, a professional waterman, to row over the Championship course on the Parramatta River for £100 a side. The innovation consisted in the stipulation that the race should be contested in ordinary waterman's skiffs. Pearce won that March 1880 contest as Laycock encountered difficulty with this type of craft.

On 29 May 1880, Laycock competed at the inaugural Sculling Championship of Victoria in Melbourne. The prize was a £50 challenge cup and a sum of money. The trophy had to be won three successive times, being held for two years against all comers. Laycock, who was given 3 to 1 odds, won this event by a length against five other scullers.

Soon after Laycock sailed for England, and lost no time in arranging several races over the Thames Championship Course, from Putney to Mortlake. On 5 October 1880, he easily beat T. Blackman. On 2 November he conquered George H. Hosmer, on 6 November he defeated J. H. Riley, and 13 November he received forfeit from J. Hawdon.

Also in 1880, Laycock won the Hop Bitters Regatta on the Thames for a £400 purse against other leading world scullers except Hanlan, who was by then the world champion. On 14 November 1880 a great sadness settled over Sydney when the news arrived by morse code that Edward Trickett had defeated Elia Laycock on the Thams in London.

He challenged Ned Hanlan for the World Sculling Championship in 1881 on the Thames in London but lost. The race also carried the English Sculling Championship title. That race was on 14 February. He also challenged Hanlan in Australia in 1884 (22 May) and lost again. That race was held on the Nepean River, NSW.

Laycock stood 6 ft 1.5 in (1.867 m) in height and rowed at 175 lb (79 kg), a more compactly built man than Trickett.

He has a fine, fair-bearded Saxon face, bearing on it the stamp of courage and determination. When in his ordinary attire he has by no means so neat an appearance as his rival. He is careless of his looks, and is so deliberate in his movements that one on cursorily meeting him would not be inclined to credit him with the vigour and energy he undeniably possesses. It is only when seen in his jersey, ready for a row, that his splendid proportions become strikingly apparent. In the words of one of his most intimate friends, he "only wakes up when he gets into his boat.

— author Richard Kyle Fox on Laycock, Edward Hanlan, America's Champion Oarsman (1880)

== Family ==
Laycock married Lucy Elizabeth Gregory on 14 September 1876 in Sydney. They had 4 children. His father was a theatre owner and a Member of Parliament, and his paternal grandfather was a colonial pioneer.

== Death ==
Laycock died in 1938 aged 93 at his residence in Cronulla, New South Wales, near Sydney. He was buried at the Woronora Anglican Cemetery at Sutherland.

== Legacy ==
Although Laycock did not win a world championship, he was still asked to pose in a photograph of key Australian scullers at a Lord Mayoral reception in December 1902 with the likes of Jim Stanbury, Pearce, Peter Kemp, Bill Beach, Michael Rush, Edward Trickett and the Towns brothers.

Laycock Street is found in Surfers Paradise, Queensland. Other nearby streets are named after other rowers such as Trickett Street, Hanlan Street, Clifford Street and another street named for American rower John Teemer.
