= John Stobbs =

19th century English songwriter and poet

John Stobbs was a 19th-century English songwriter and poet who lived in the Tyneside district. Many of his writings are in the Geordie dialect.

== Known details ==
There is little information on John Stobbs, except that he was (like William Egglestone) noted for his humorous monologues and appeared to either subscribe to other books, like the Descriptive and Historical Account of the Town and County of Newcastle-upon-Tyne by Eneas Mackenzie, published c. 1827, or for him or his works to be quoted in the works by the work's author.

== Works ==
The following songs have been attributed to John Stobbs, all of which appear in The Shields Garland:

- Blow the Wind Southerly – A note at the foot of the song may attribute authorship to Alexander Brighton
- Coal trade (The) – In some places this is attributed to William Brockie, but a note on the manuscript states that it was “touched up” by Brockie
- Fitter he has Daughters three, Drive away the Waggons, Hinny (The) - A Sailor's song at the capstan
- Jenny Chowk’d the Bairn
- Liberty for the sailors, a Shields song for the days of the Press-gang
- Pound of tea
- Sweepy's Lovely Daughter (The)
- Tally I, O, the grinder or A Sailor's Song at the Capstan
- Tynemouth (or "Tynemouth Abbey" (music by Thomas Haswell)

== Known recordings ==
- Blow the Wind Southerly - A recording available on MWM Records sung by Judy Dinning
- Liberty for the sailors - this song also appears in Northumbrian Minstrelsy by Bruce and Stokoe, 1882 - A recording available on MWM Records sung by Jane Wade
- Sweepy's Lovely Daughter (The) - A recording available on MWM records sung by Benny Graham
- Tally I, O, the grinder - A recording available on MWM records sung by Ray Stubbs and the Hush

== See also ==
- Geordie dialect words
