= William Brockie =

Scottish writer (1811–1890)

William Brockie (1811–1890) was a 19th-century Scottish born writer, newspaper editor, poet and songwriter who lived for many years in Sunderland.

== Life ==
William Brockie, at the time of his death was one of the oldest journalists in the North of England, and widely known as a poet, a linguist, a man of science and religion. William Brockie came of the old Border yeoman stock, and was the son of Alexander and Janet Brockie, having been born on 1 March 1811, at Lauder East Mains.

His education was obtained in the parish schools of Smailhome, Mertoun, and Melrose, in the last named of which he was articled to a firm of solicitors, in 1825. Whilst serving his articles he frequently had the delight of meeting Sir Walter Scott, and many of the local characters who appeared in the Waverley Novels, in addition to Sir David Brewster, then living at Gattonside, James Hogg, better known as "The Ettrick Shepherd", and many other of Scott's personal friends.

After completing his articles, he removed to Edinburgh with the intention of starting practice for himself, but a commercial panic prevented this, and he soon returned to his parents, though not before he had stayed long enough in the "Modern Athens" to hear in the Parliament House such men as Jeffrey, Moncrieff, Cockburn, and other famous advocates, whilst he also had the privilege of hearing Dr. Chalmers, among other eminent divines. He remained farming with his parents for several years, until a false friend, by a swindling transaction, brought the father to ruin, and put an end to the rural pursuits of the son. In 1841 we hear of him as book-keeper and traveller to a wholesale firm, and later in charge of a school at Kailzie, Peeblesshire, which he relinquished on joining the Free Church, and then started his lengthy journalistic career by becoming editor of Border, a Free Church paper published at Kelso. Three years later he entered into partnership with the proprietor, but the latter taking to drink, the partnership was dissolved, the paper sold, and its name changed to under which name it still flourishes.

From this time until 1852, when his health gave way, Mr. Brockie was editor of North and Gazette.

Having recruited his health, he resumed the scholastic profession and opened a school at South Shields, where he became a member of the Town Council, being elected without canvassing or making a single speech. In the same year he married Miss Mary Niel, daughter of the Rev. Robert Niel, Presbyterian Minister, at Wallsend, who died in 1879, without issue.

In 1860 he removed to Sunderland to take the editorial chair of The Sunderland Times, a bi-weekly newspaper, but which it was intended to make into a daily paper, the whole plant having been purchased for that purpose, but the illness and death of the proprietor, Alderman James Williams, prevented this scheme being carried out, to the great disappointment of Mr. Brockie, who had hoped to have been the editor of the first daily paper in Sunderland. He, however, continued to edit the paper until 1873, when failing health compelled him to resign. From that time he was a constant contributor to the Newcastle Weekly Chronicle, the Monthly Chronicle, the Sunderland Weekly Echo, and the London Weekly Echo, during its rather brief existence.

In 1886 Mr. Brockie married Mrs. Mackenzie, a widow lady of considerable literary ability, who greatly aided him in his work, and especially after he himself became too infirm to move about. Mr. Brockie's work was chiefly journalistic, but he found time to publish The Folks of Shield, The History of Shields, The Leaderside Legends, Gypsies of Yetholm, The History of Coldingham Priory, Legends and Superstitions of the County of Durham, Indian Thought. Mr. Brockie was a man who could not be idle, and as long as health permitted, he was an untiring collector of notes. He was a remarkable linguist, knowing French, German, Spanish, Italian, Portuguese, Dutch, Danish, Swedish, and both ancient and modern Greek; he could, with the aid of a dictionary, read Welsh, Gaelic, and some half dozen other tongues. Added to these wonderful qualifications was his knowledge where to get at any information required, and if, in conversation, any doubt occurred, he would never rest until, by reference to one or more of the 3,000 volumes which formed his library, he had settled the matter. His personal character was as estimable as his abilities were remarkable. All persons, irrespective of class, creed, or politics, were welcome at his house, and received the same courtesy, the Professor or the railway porter, the Mormon missionary, the Catholic priest, or the secularist, the Tory or the Radical: in fact his house was a rendezvous for most of the scientific and literary men in the North of England.

No notice of Mr. Brockie could be complete without some reference to the Free Associate Church, of which, if not the actual founder, he certainly was the moving spirit. This religious body resembled to some extent that founded by Mrs. Humphrey Ward, the author of Robed membership leaving each member responsible solely for his own opinions, not affecting his relation to other associations. One of the principles was" there can be no true happiness apart from morality, nor any permanent good without intelligence." The members, whilst pronouncing no dogma or adherence to any creed, sought" to arrive at a harmonious understanding and to occupy a common ground, with a view to united action for the furtherance or advancement, both within and without their immediate circle, of all that is truly good, elevating, useful, and honourable" The association lasted barely six years, during the whole of which time Mr. Brockie acted as President, and was always ready to aid in any way by lectures or addresses, and to help those who could no longer find a home in any of the usual places of worship. All work was done voluntarily, no fees were given, and during its brief existence the Association was instrumental in bringing such men as Dr. Congreve, Mr. Moncure Conway, Mr. Auberon Herbert, and many other well-known men, to deliver addresses. A difficulty about getting a suitable place of meeting, by reason of the large rent asked, was the final cause of the dissolution of the little body in June 1886. Mr. Brockie did not fill any public office in Sunderland beyond being a member of the Museum and Free Library Committee, where he rendered excellent service in the compilation of the Catalogue.

Mr. Brockie died at his residence, 22 Olive Street, Sunderland, on 20 October 1890, in his 80th year. His health had been failing for some time, but with the assistance of his wife he was able to continue his literary work until almost the last. About ten months before his death he had a serious illness, from which he rallied only for a time. The immediate cause of death was a paralytic seizure. Five weeks afterwards he died in the presence of his household. He died a poor man: he was too generous ever to be a rich one, even if his daily work had been such as to accumulate wealth, for which he had no ambition. The reason why Mr. Brockie was not more widely known was because, in spite of all his wonderful attainments, he preferred" to be loved and understood at home." '

== Works ==
During his period as editor of the various newspapers, he also researched and wrote various songs, poems and many serious books particularly on the subject of local history and folk legends. These include :-
Books

- The Gypsies of Yetholm (1884) for which he is best known in the Borders,
- Coldingham Priory (1886)
- A Day in the Land of Scott
- Leaderside Legends
- Legends and Superstitions of the County of Durham (1886)
- Sunderland Notables (1894)

Extracts from some of his writings appear in Allan's Illustrated Edition of Tyneside Songs including paragraphs on Robert "Bobby" Shaftoe (page 2), Thomas Whittle (pages 10 & 11), George Pickering (pages 23 & 24) and John Peacock (page 343)

Songs and poems
William Brockie edited the three volumes of The Shields Garland, a series of booklets containing "Shields" songs which show the towns of Cullercoats, Tynemouth, North Shields and South Shields, small coastal towns on both sides of the Tyne. All are variously famous for fishwives, press gangs, ships, boats and sailors, and beautiful scenery.
Included in the three books are 2 works attributed to Brockie :-
The Modern Pandora
A Love Story – addressed to M N
A set of the original documents are bound together and held by South Shields library.
Volume 1 and 2 are thought to be complete while Volume 3 starts at page 17 (but this would be the start if the pages of the previous volumes are included in the numbering?)
They are published by the Shields Gazette editor, William Brockie

== See also ==
- Geordie dialect words
