= William Elliott (rower) =

- Born: 1849; Northumberland. United Kingdom
- Title: Professional Sculling Champion of England
- Term: 1879
- Predecessor: J Higgins
- Successor: Ned Hanlan

William Elliott was born at Hay Farm, Northumberland, 28 November 1849 and was the Professional Sculling Champion of England. He stood five feet seven and one half inches in height and untrained he weighed 176 pounds; trained, 167 pounds.

== Rowing career ==
Elliott began his rowing career in 1875, when he defeated William, Martin, of Blyth, and afterwards J. Hogarth, the champion of the Wear. His third race was with J. Finnegan, who defeated him after a desperate race. In August 1875, he entered the Manchester and Sanford regatta. He rowed in the handicap single-scull race and won the first heat, defeating Cobbett, to whom he conceded five and a half lengths; but in the second series J. Anderson, of Hammersmith, beat him easily. In the final Nicholson and Smith came together, and the former was the winner.

In March 1877, Elliott had displayed such form and made such fast rowing on the Tyne that he was entered to compete for the championship cup and £250, open to all comers. The race was rowed on the Tyne, distance 3 miles 713 yards. Robert Watson Boyd won and Elliott, with Nicholson and Lumsden were defeated. Elliott's first match of importance was against George Tarryer, of Bermondsey, which he won easily. Having beaten so good a man as the Thames sculler, who is credited with having rowed from Putney aqueduct to the Ship at Mortlake in the fastest time on record, his friends became jubilant, consequently they soon cast about for a fresh opponent, and on the Tyne, Robert Bagnall, of the Ouseburn, and William Nicholson went down before him.

On 4 March 1878, Elliott again competed for the champion cup and £200 on the Tyne course, 3 miles 713 yards straightaway, his opponent being William Nicholson. Elliott rowed a grand race, rowing in high wind and rough water, and winning easily. These successes led the Newcastle people to think that they had another champion at hand ready to do battle for the championship, which had vanished from their sight by the last defeat of Boyd by Higgins, and there is little doubt at that time they really had got the best man in the north.

With commendable spirit they issued the challenge to the champion, and they also made a match with Thomas, of Hammersmith, to row on 6 May 1878, for £200. Higgins, who was then champion of England, accepted the challenge to row Elliott, and the match was made. Thus it will be seen that in the short space of five months Elliott had scarcely been out of training, and he had to row four matches. For this most recent event Elliott, after beating Thomas, went home to James Taylor's, at Newcastle, when he was sent to Whitley, journeying to the Tyne each day for his rowing exercise. The race took place on the Thames, from Putney to Mortlake, (the Championship Course) on 3 June 1878, for £200 and the English Sculling Championship. The course was four and three-eighths miles. The Tyne boatmen were confident he would win, and £50 to £40 was readily offered by his backers.

On the day of the race Elliott looked big, and did not take so well in the preliminary spin as Higgins, who never appeared in such good trim for a sculling race before, and the offers of 7 to 4 on Elliott, which were then current, found more takers. Elliott gained two lengths on the First mile; then Higgins took the lead, and reached Barnes' railway bridge in 20 minutes 13 seconds, Elliott then being 1 minute 13 seconds in the rear and finally Higgins passed the judge (Mr. Moore, of the London Rowing Club), opposite the ship, a winner by about 600 yards, his time for the whole course being 24 minutes 38 seconds, nearly two minutes before Elliott. There was never a North v. South struggle in which more money was speculated in Newcastle than on this occasion. The coin was fairly piled on Elliott, until at one time as much as two to one was laid on the Blyth sculler. Bookmakers, however, did not tire of accepting the odds, and were enabled to reap a slight profit through telegraphing to Putney to be on at the starting price. This might possibly account for the position which Elliott occupied when the race was begun. Immense interest was manifested in the struggle by the inhabitants of the metropolis of the north, and at 3 o'clock on Monday afternoon there could not have been less than 5,000 persons assembled in front of the offices of the Newcastle Chronicle to learn the result. The liveliest excitement prevailed in the crowd, and as much as 5 to 1 was laid on Elliott by one sanguine individual. When the telegram, "Higgins won easily," was exhibited, therefore, the people were perfectly paralysed, and for a long time they treated the thing as a practical joke. Elliott was not satisfied with his defeat, for he issued the following challenge: "William Elliott, of Blyth, will row any south country culler a match over the Tyne championship course, in two-month's [sic] time, for £200 a side." Higgins wanted to row on the Thames, and no match was then made.

== Thames International Regatta ==
On 31 August 1878, Elliott entered the single scull race at the Thames International Regatta, against J. Higgins, and defeated him easily over the Thames championship course; and, with Nicholson, Boyd and Lumsden, won the four oared championship. After this race Elliott accepted a challenge from Higgins to row for £200 and the championship of England, and the race took place on 17 February 1879. Elliott was victorious in a time of 22 minutes 1 second. See also English Sculling Championship. Elliott was a well formed, muscular athlete, and the fastest oarsman in Great Britain, and boating men both on the Thames and Tyne were confident lie could outrow any one. However, Elliott was beaten for the Championship by Ned Hanlan on 16 June 1879. The stake was £200 a side.
