= John Peacock (songwriter) =

John Peacock (died 1867) was a South Shields born songwriter and poet in the 19th century. His most famous piece is possibly "Marsden Rocks".

== Life ==
John Peacock (died 1867) was born in South Shields.
He was born in the City of York in the year 1799 He went to sea at the age of 12 and was captured by the French during either the French Revolutionary Wars or, more likely, the Napoleonic Wars between France and Britain.
He was a prisoner for several years being confined in a camp in northern France.
his ship the ' Neva' being captured by the French Privateer Maria Louisa He was at various times a seaman, prisoner of war, ( in the French prison in the fortress of Cambray for four years ) shoemaker, Chartist, Co-operative storekeeper, and a second hand bookseller with premises in the Market Place, South Shields.
His address was number 2 George Street South Shields . A description given in "The Weekly Chronicle" by Mr William Brockie in his regular column on "Local songs and songwriters" was of a man who was "sober, intelligent, sharp witted and well known".

He wrote several pieces of poetry, many of which appeared in "The Shields Garland" in 1859.

According to The Shields Daily News Monday 17 June 1867 he was seen to have fallen to his knees in the Market Place of South Shields and was reported to have died ' of an attack of apoplexy ' by Dr Tosach ( as reported by the Shields Daily News.

== Works ==
These include :-

Marsden Rocks – to the tune of "Jockey to the Fair"
The Tallow Ship – tells the tale of the 600 tons of tallow candles, a must in every household before electricity, were washed ashore at South Shields, and how the population cleared the beach very quickly.

== See also ==
Geordie dialect words
