= Beacon Light (lighthouse) =

Former lighthouse off the coast of Saint John, New Brunswick

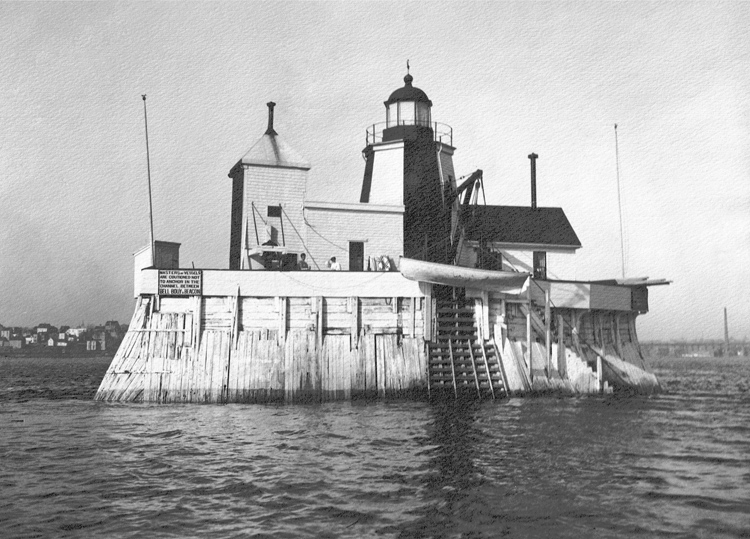
- Location: Saint John Harbour, Saint John, New Brunswick
- Coordinates: 45.250221°N 66.053437°W

Tower
- Constructed: 1828

Light
- Deactivated: 1913

The Beacon Light was a lighthouse in Saint John, New Brunswick, Canada. It was located in the Saint John Harbour's entrance and sat atop a wooden pier in the harbour. It was first erected in 1828 and rebuilt in 1868 after being destroyed by fire the year prior. It was discontinued in 1913 and burned.

== History ==
The Beacon Light was first erected in 1828, located in the Saint John Harbour in Saint John, New Brunswick. It sat atop a wooden pier in the harbour and was the second lighthouse in New Brunswick at the time, with a construction cost of £672 3s 3d. One of the earliest keepers, William Gold, was appointed in April 1830 and served until his death in April the following year. On the morning of January 7, 1867, the lighthouse was destroyed by fire while the keeper was absent, leaving the harbour completely reliant on Partridge Island's lighthouse. The keeper's two sons, who were present during the fire, managed to save four reflectors before escaping. The Colonial Government took notice of the Beacon Light's temporary discontinuation due to the fire.

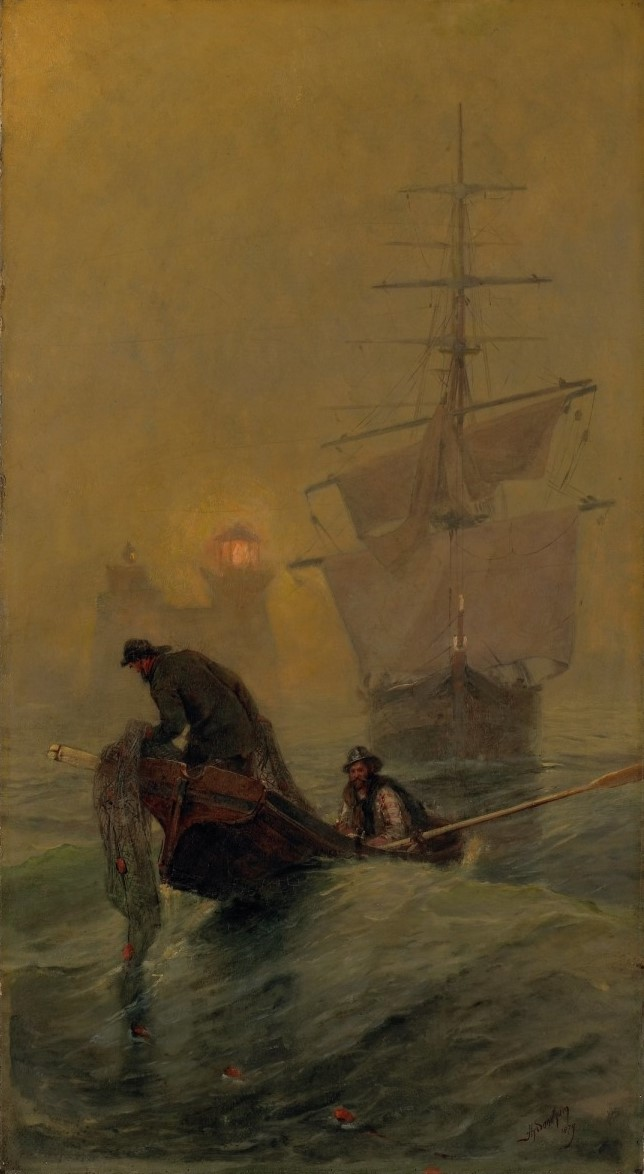
Beacon Light, Saint John Harbour (Henry Sandham, 1879)

=== Second lighthouse ===
In 1868, John McLachlan rebuilt the lighthouse and pier at a cost of $2,300. During October 4–5 the following year, a tropical cyclone dubbed the "Saxby Gale" produced large waves throughout the Bay of Fundy region. The Beacon Light received extensive damage, including the tearing off of shingles, boards, and part of the pier, resulting in repair costs totalling $898. Over the next few years, the station underwent multiple installations, including a large fog bell for the lighthouse in 1871, a bell tower on the pier in 1875, and additional machinery. Maintenance repairs were frequently needed for the pier due to being in the open harbour waters.

In 1913, the Beacon Light was discontinued, when on August 20, 1913, it was deliberately destroyed by fire to be removed as part of a harbour expansion project to widen the entrance channel. The structure had been soaked in oil and set ablaze. It was replaced by a combined gas and whistling buoy.

== List of keepers ==
Name	Year	Reference	Service Notes
William Good	1830–1831		Appointed in April 1831. Served as lighthouse keeper until his death in April 1831.
George Lane	1833–at least 1844		
James Lane	1854–1866		
Joseph Coram	Unknown–1869		
James E. Earle	1869		
Elijah Rose	1869–1873		
Timothy Clark	1873–1893		
George H. Clark	1893–1901		
William McLaren	1901–1902		
Wilson Gregg	1903–1909		Served as lighthouse keeper until his death in November 1909.
Andrew F. Shepherd	1909–1912		

== See also ==
- List of lighthouses in New Brunswick
