= Shields Garland =

Song

The Shields Garland is a Chapbook of Geordie folk songs consisting of three small volumes, published in the 1850s

== The publication ==
William Brockie edited the three volumes of "'The Shields Garland'", a series of booklets containing "Shields" songs which show the towns of Cullercoats, Tynemouth, North Shields and South Shields, small coastal towns on both sides of the Tyne. All are variously famous for fishwives, Press Gangs, ships, boats and sailors, and beautiful scenery.
Included in the three books are 2 works attributed to Brockie himself (The Modern Pandora and A Love Story – addressed to M N)
A set of the original documents are bound together and held by South Shields library.
Volume 1 and 2 are thought to be complete while Volume 3 starts at page 17 (but this would be the start if the pages of the previous volumes are included in the numbering?)
They are published by the Shields Gazette editor, William Brockie and printed by T. F. Brockie & Co. of South Shields. Who also produced the Shields Gazette.

== Contents ==
The Shields garland Number 1

- page 1 and 2 – Liberty for the sailors, a Shields song for the days of the Press-gang – by John Stobbs
- page 2, 3 and 4 – Pound of tea – to the tune of Dame Durdon – by John Stobbs
- page 4, 5 and 6 – Jenny Chowk’d the Bairn – by John Stobbs
- page 6 and 7 – Tynemouth – music by Thomas Haswell, words by John Stobbs
- page 7 – Blow the Wind Southerley – This version (possibly) by John Stobbs

possibly the last as it has publishers note at base

The Shields garland Number 2

- page 8 and 9 – The coal trade – by John Stobbs
- page 9, 10 and 11 – The Tallow Ship – by John Peacock
- page 11 and 12 – Marsden Rocks – to the tune of Jockey to the fair – by John Peacock
- page 12, 13 and 14 – The Modern Pandora – (possibly) by William Brockie
- page 14 and 15 – The Cliffs of Old Tynemouth – by David Ross Lietch
- page 15 – Friendship – writer unknown

possibly the last as it has publishers note at base

The Shields garland Number 3

- page 17 and 18 – Tally I, O, the grinder or A Sailor’s Song at the Capstan – (possibly) by John Stobbs
- page 18 – Peter Allan’s Door – to the tune of tune The Days when we went gypsying – by William Mitford
- page 19, 20 and 21 – The Steam Ferry – writer unknown
- page 21 – A Love Song addressed to M N – (possibly) by William Brockie
- page 24 – The Northern Star – writer unknown
- page 25, 25 and 27 – The Sweepy’s Lovely Daughter – by John Stobbs
- page 27, 28 and 29 – The Fitter he has Daughters three, Drive away the Waggons, Hinny. A Sailor’s song at the capstan – by John Stobbs
- page 29 and 30 – The self made squire – writer unknown

Note 1 – Volumes 1 and 2 have no actual page numbers. The numbers given above are solely to distinguish between the pages.
The numberings use against volume 3 are actual.
Note 2 – Tynemouth (on pages 6 and 7 of volume 1) is also often referred to as Tynemouth Abbey.

== See also ==
- Geordie dialect words
