= Frenchman's Bay (South Shields) =

Bay in Tyne and Wear, England

Coordinates: 54.989°N 1.392°W

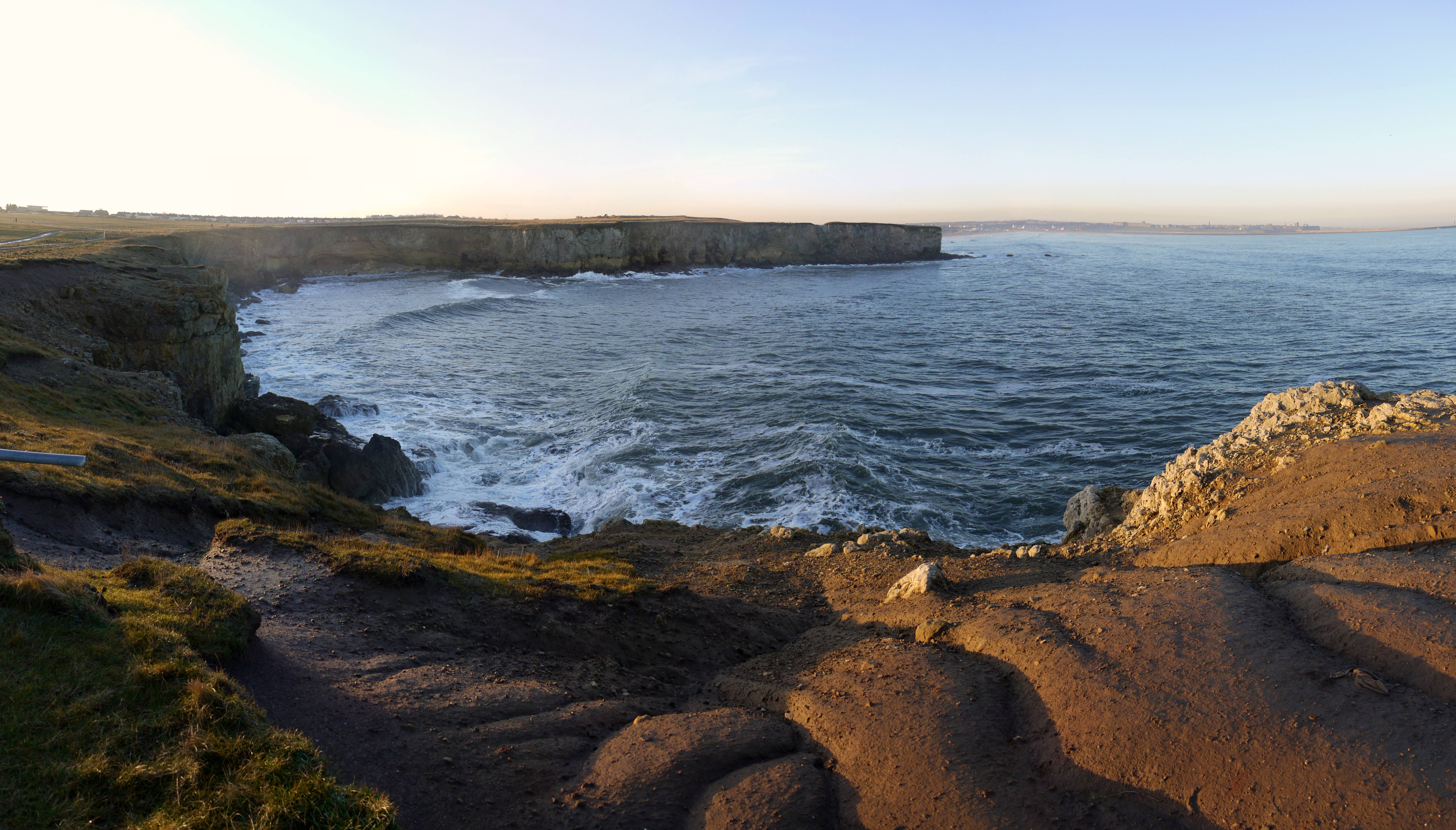

Frenchman’s Bay is a small bay between South Shields and Marsden Grotto, Tyne and Wear. The O.S. grid reference is NZ392660.

== See also ==
- Geordie dialect words
