= Wally Ross =

Sailing pioneer

Wallace “Wally” Ross (1922–2013) was a modern sailing pioneer. As co-author of Sail Power in 1975, Ross contributed to the sport's final intellectualization after 1971 when Arvel Gentry completed his sail theory work using computational fluid dynamics (CFD). Wally Ross took his degrees from Cornell University between 1944 and 1948, after serving with the 10th Mountain Division during the Second World War.

== Expertise ==
Ross was President of Hard Sails & Seaboard Marine from 1954 to 1974 and a Marine Writer with Ross Marine after 1975. At Hard Sails, Ross made sails for over one hundred national and international small-boat champions. These included many in the 12-Meter class, including champion yachts Phantome, Windigo, Tempest, and Ondine. Among Ross' innovations were the radial spinnaker, the spherical spinnaker.

=== Hard Sails ===
Wally Ross purchased Hard Sails, Inc. in 1954 from a friend, William Hard. Ross had been an account executive at a local Long Island radio station and Hard Sails was one of his accounts. Hard Sails, Inc. was based in Islip, Long Island. Ross's subsequent success at sailmaking came during the exploding yachting boom during the early 1960s when, coincidentally, synthetic materials were first available for the crafting of sails. Ross's work in Dacron gave his staff a medium that held its shape, allowing for the application of aerodynamic theory to sailing. A material holding shape also allowed for relative mass production, especially when compared to the older, individual sailmaking techniques using Egyptian cotton. By the mid-1960s, Hard Sails was using a new device – the computer – to accelerate the design process, laying the foundations for Gentry's work between 1969 and 1971. Ross's seminal work, Sail Power, was the intellectual capstone of the previous decade's intellectualization of sail.

=== Engineered Sailmaking ===
In the late 1950s, the critical personnel acquisition for Hard Sails was Owen Torrey. Wally Ross and OwenTorrey were fellow Long Island Sound competitive sailors. The two men held a historic meeting at the Tap Room of the storied Larchmont Yacht Club. Torrey invested in the revitalized company, and became the sail designer. Torrey designed his first sails via slide rule, plotting curves while riding to his day job on the Long Island Railroad. Hard Sails’ first formula-cut mainsail appeared a year later. The engineered sail was criticized as too extreme. It was purchased by competitive sailor William Cox, raised on his Lightning class sailboat, and was the key to winning the World Championship the next year at Buffalo, New York. Between 1954 and 1961, Hard Sails subsequently pioneered several different sail curves for various Lightning class masts and clothes.

=== The Spinnaker Work ===
In the early 1960s, the team of Ross and Torrey applied the computational revolution to spinnaker sails. Ross was a paratrooper during the Second World War with the fabled 10th Mountain Division. Relying on parachute research, Hard Sails created a crosscut spherical chute and dominated the spinnaker market. A flatter spinnaker followed, allowing them to maintain a competitive edge on their peers. These early efforts resulted in synthetic nylon spinnakers with cross-cut construction. Ross and Torrey's understanding of force stress maps moved the art of sailmaking forward. To accommodate point loads in the spinnaker's head, tack and clew, threads were aligned with the stress lines and point loads. Torrey's slide rule mapped these forces, and resulted in the standard-design of radial head spinnakers commanding the market until the early 1990s. Wally Ross's spinnakers, in particular, transferred the radial gores for the head into the shoulders and stopped at the center panels or center section, where aerodynamic loads were minor and craft techniques prejudiced the older cross-cut panel alignment.

=== The SONAR Class ===
Ross also was the financial backer to the development of the SONAR class of club racing sailboats in the late 1980s. The goal was to produce a “a boat with a large, comfortable, cockpit that could accommodate a gaggle of kids or non-sailors as a good teaching machine. They also wanted good light-air sailing performance . . . with a high sail area/wetted surface ratio . . . a light boat that could be easily drysailed and trailered. . . They wanted a fun dinghy-like boat to sail, . . . a fairly flat hull and planned for a jib, not a genoa.” The SONAR class expanded from the Larchmont Yacht Club's Fleet No. 1, and went worldwide. Wally Ross formed a company, Ross Marine, to market the new SONAR class.

== Member ==
At Cornell he joined the Phi Kappa Psi fraternity, and through that organization was a member of the Irving Literary Society (Cornell University).
