= J. W. Swanston =

English printer, publisher

J. W. Swanston was a Newcastle printer, and publisher of many chapbooks. The premises were in St Andrews Street, off Gallowgate, quite near what is now St James' Park football stadium, the home of Newcastle United F.C., although this ground was not built until 1892.

Swanston was responsible for the publication and printing of numerous chapbooks, of which one noted version was The Tyneside Songster.

He was also a member of the Tyneside Naturalists' Field Club.

His published and printed works include :-

- Nine Hours’ Movement; A History of the engineers’ strike in Newcastle and Gateshead
- Social Science and the Liquor Traffic: The Judgment of Science, of Philanthropy, and of Intellect, an 8-page pamphlet printed in 1870
- Several pamphlets for the Northern Reform League for James McKendrick
- Several Chapbooks including The Tyneside Songster

== See also ==
- Geordie dialect words
- The Tyneside Songster by J W Swanston
