= Nine Hours Strike =

British labour dispute (1871)

- Date: August 1871
- Location: Newcastle upon Tyne
- Goals: 9 hour work days

Parties
Amalgamated Society of Engineers (ASE); Nine Hours League	Masters of Newcastle upon Tyne

The Nine Hours Strike was an 1871 engineering labour dispute in Newcastle upon Tyne, England. Its name referred to the engineers' demand for an average working day to be at most nine hours, following the Factories Act 1847.

== History ==
=== Strike ===
The Nine Hours Strike began in August 1871, when engineers in Newcastle upon Tyne, Gateshead, and adjoining areas of Tyneside requested that their employers limit working hours to 9 hours at most per day. Though spearheaded by members of the Amalgamated Society of Engineers (ASE), approximately 10% of the engineers involved in the strike were unionized. Instead of relying on established union strength, a temporary organization known as the "Nine Hours League" was formed under the leadership of John Burnett, a member of the ASE District Committee.

Though a similar strike in Sunderland had been resolved within four weeks a few months earlier, the Nine Hours Strike continued for five months and included over 8,000 participants. Most of the strikers were not well-educated. Those who could read and write—such as John Brown, grandfather of anarcho-syndicalist engineer Tom Brown—contacted local newspapers and began their own publications, which circulated widely across Great Britain.

Strikes in Great Britain attracted limited public support until the early 1900s, but the nationwide support for the Nine Hours Strike was notable. Nearly three months into the strike, the movement gained traction, receiving financial and material support from across Great Britain, even as British engineering companies attempted to curtail this backing. Matthew Dryden, a Tyneside songwriter, wrote "Perseveer" or "The Nine Oors Movement" (written in Geordie dialect words and sung to the tune of "Nelly Ray"), and staged concerts to raise funds for the strikers.

Faced with growing national support for the strike, company executives (led by Sir W.G. Armstrong, proprietor of Armstrong Whitworth) organized to call in strikebreakers from the edges of the British Isles, Belgium, and Germany to continue operations. These efforts were halted by a representative from the International Workingmen's Association, who persuaded the strikebreakers to return home.

=== Outcome ===
After the strike, engineering firms agreed to a shorter 54-hour work week consisting of six 9-hour days, later adjusted to five 9-and-a-half-hour days and a shorter 6-and-a-half-hour day on Saturday. The agreement was adjusted again to limit Saturdays to 5-and-a-half hours.

In the years that followed, similar strikes spread across Great Britain, involving engineers, shipbuilding workers, and other disciplines. John Burnett, former head of the Nine Hours League, later became General Secretary of the ASE.

== See also ==
- Geordie dialect words
- Trade unions in the United Kingdom
- Strike action
- Nine-Hour Movement, a similar effort around the same time in Canada
