= James Ellis (antiquary) =

English lawyer and antiquary

James Ellis (1763?–1830) was an English lawyer and antiquary.

Ellis was the son of William Ellis, a glover, of Hexham, and was born about January 1763. He practised as a solicitor in Hexham, and then at Newcastle upon Tyne. He was the author of some verses referred to in Moses Aaron Richardson's Table Book. He also had an extensive knowledge of Border history, communicated materials on the subject to Sir Walter Scott, who was sometimes his guest at Otterburne Hall in Northumberland.

Ellis died 25 (or 26) March 1830.
