= Edward Trickett =

Australian rower (1851–1916)

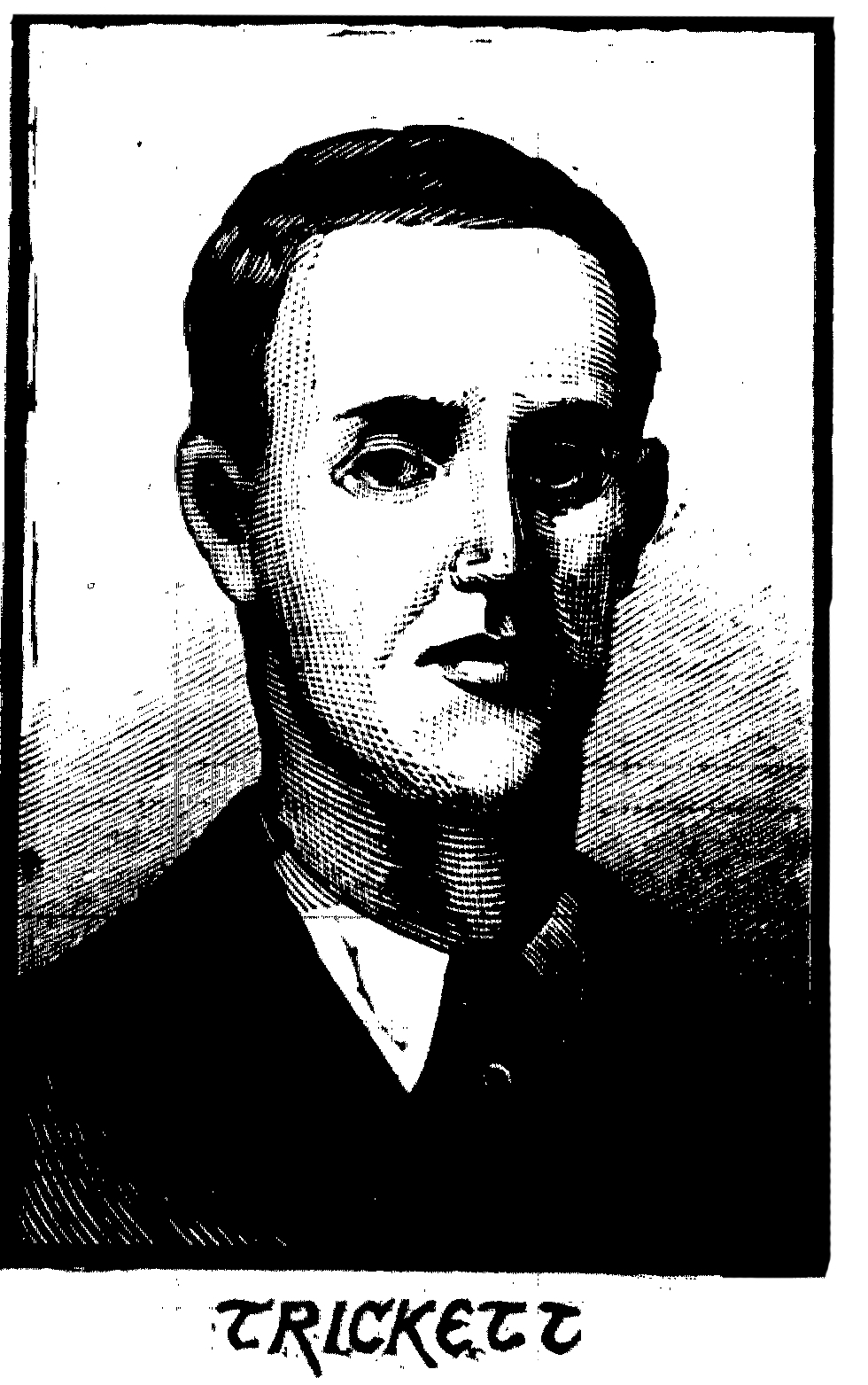
- Born: Edward Trickett; 12 September 1851; Greenwich, New South Wales
- Died: 28 November 1916 (aged 65); Uralla, New South Wales, Australia
- Resting place: Uralla Cemetery, New South Wales
- Other names: Ned Trickett
- Title: World champion sculler
- Term: 1871–1876
- Predecessor: Joseph Henry Sadler
- Successor: Ned Hanlan

Edward "Ned" Trickett (12 September 1851 – 28 November 1916) was an Australian rower. He was the first Australian to be recognised as a world champion in any sport, after winning the World Sculling Championship in 1876, a title he held until 1880, when he was beaten by Canadian Ned Hanlan.

Trickett was born at Greenwich, on the Lane Cove River in Sydney. His father was a former convict and a bootmaker and his mother was Irish. The young Ned learned to scull on Sydney Harbour in New South Wales, Australia.

Records show that rowing matches between crews of visiting ships had been taking place on the harbour from as early as 1805. The Sydney Gazette newspaper recorded "The first Australian Regatta" in 1827 with a rowing race for 20 Spanish dollars and both rowing and sailing were established sports by 1837 when the first Anniversary Regatta was held in Sydney.

== Early rowing career ==
Trickett's took part in his first race at the age of ten. It was the Anniversary Day Regatta and he finished second in the under-16 maiden sculls. At the age of fourteen he won the 12-foot dinghy title also at the Anniversary Day Regatta. He went on to defeat most of the State's professional scullers to become Australian Professional Sculling Champion.

His occupation was noted as a quarryman and he met his wife, the daughter of a lighthouse keeper, whilst delivering stone for the construction of a new lighthouse at South Head. He was an extremely tall person for his time, being 6 feet 3 1/2 inches (1.92 metres) tall and would have stood out in any crowd.

By 1874 Trickett was gaining a reputation as a rower and in the Balmain Regatta of that year, he won the outrigger race and was in the winning whaleboat crew. Later that same year he placed second to Michael Rush in the Clarence River Champion Outrigger Race. At the Anniversary Regatta of 1875 he won the light skiffs race and was now the best sculler in the colony of NSW.

== Champion of the World ==
In May 1876 the Sydney innkeeper, James Punch, who was a former sculler, took Trickett to England. He went on to win Australia's first world sporting title on 27 June 1876 by defeating the two-times champion, Englishman Joseph Sadler, for the World Sculling Championship, starting a Golden Age for Australian professional sculling. The world title was held by seven Australians for 22 of the 31 years between 1876 and 1907.

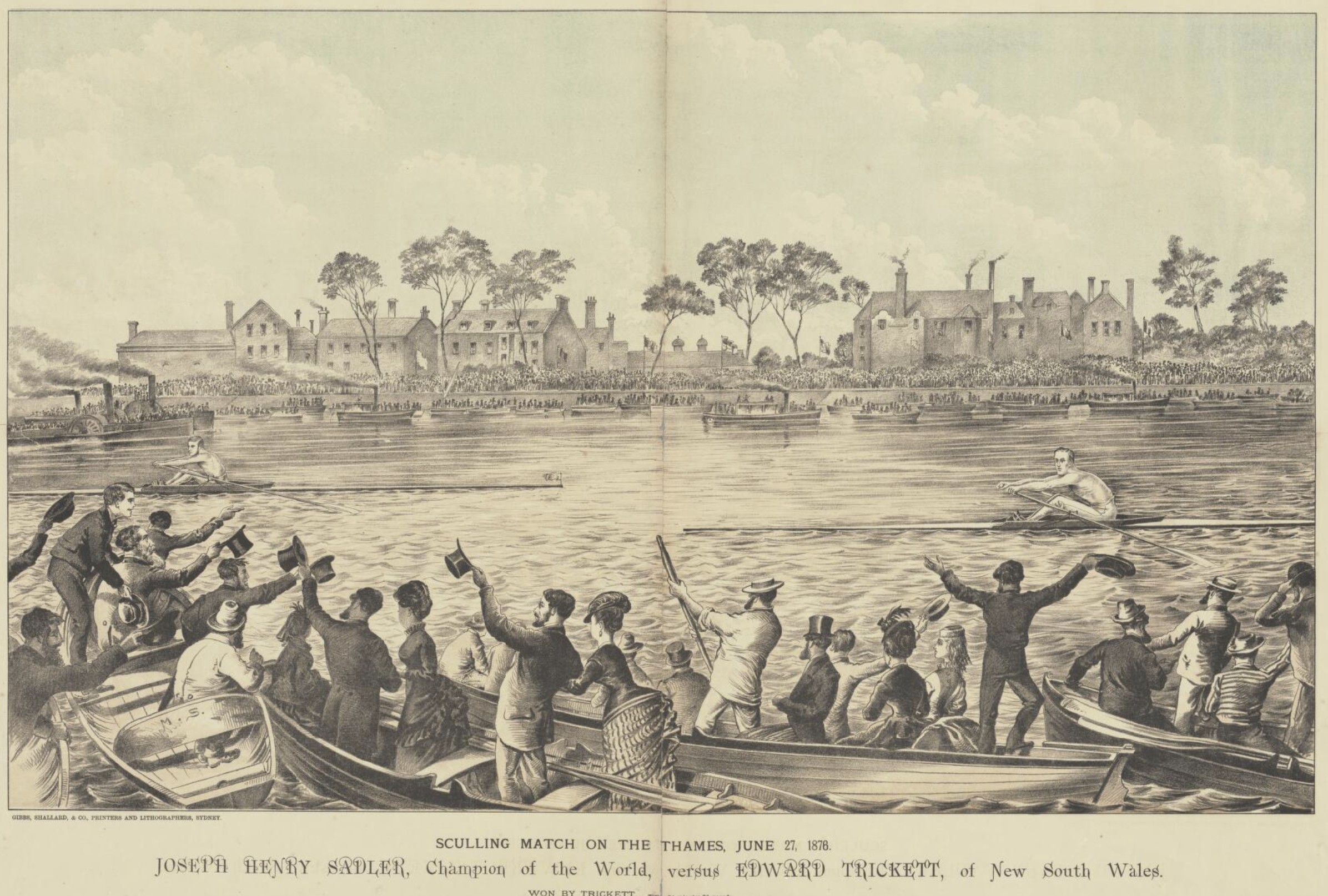
Sculling Championship of the World - 1876 - Edward Trickett defeats John Joseph Sadler

The course for the race was the Championship Course from Putney to Mortlake on the Thames, a distance of nearly four and a quarter miles. A very large crowd was on hand, both on the banks and in boats, to witness the race. Trickett used a boat named "Young Australia" and his weight was given as 11 st 4 lbs. The race commenced just after 5:30 pm and Sadler dipped his oars first to gain a slight advantage. This advantage was soon lost as Trickett came up and passed Sadler. At Craven Point the challenger was a good length ahead and at the Crab Tree he had increased this to two lengths. Hammersmith Bridge was reached in 9 minutes 35 seconds and his lead was up to three and a half lengths. Shortly afterwards Sadler quickened and reduced the deficit to only about one length but could not make sufficient gain to pass Trickett who sculled strongly to cross the finish line some four lengths to the good. The time was 24 minutes 36 seconds. Trickett thus became the first Australian World Champion in any sport. Additionally, he collected £400 in stake money. Upon his return to Sydney, 25,000 people greeted him and he was wined and dined all around the state.

== First defence ==
In June the following year fellow Australian Michael Rush challenged Trickett for the World Championship. The scullers had raced before for the New South Wales Championship but the race was unequal because Trickett used the new sliding seat and Rush continued to use a fixed seat. The stake for the World Title was £400 a side. Rush had not learned his lesson and again used the fixed seat while Trickett used a sliding seat which gave him a huge advantage notwithstanding claims to the contrary by Rush's backers. The course was on the Parramatta River, Sydney, over a distance of about three and a half miles. After an even start Rush went ahead and by Uhr's Point was a clear length ahead. However, by the mile and a half point Trickett had overtaken the leader and from then on the race was a procession and he crossed the line twenty-two seconds ahead. The total time was 23m.26.3s. Alan May wrote in Sydney Rows magazine that it was "a race that was said to have excited more interest than any other event that has ever happened in the sporting world of Australia." Some fifty thousand people were said to have witnessed the race. Trickett won several non-title races over the next couple of years and earned enough money to buy a hotel. He became licensee of Trickett's Hotel and later became the proprietor of the International Hotel which was located on the corner of Pitt and King Streets in Sydney. However, in June 1878, he was involved in an accident when a rolling keg of beer crushed his hand and several fingers had to be amputated. This was to affect the balance of his stroke in future races and was possibly the cause of the downturn in Edward Trickett's rowing.

== Second defence ==
Trickett's next came from Elias C. Laycock, also of Australia, on 29 August 1879. Laycock was without doubt one of Australia's finest scullers but he never managed to become World Champion. The esteem in which he was held can be estimated by the fact that he was still asked to pose in a photograph of key Australian scullers at a Lord Mayoral reception in 1903 with the likes of Stanbury, Pearce, Peter Kemp (rower), Bill Beach, Rush, Trickett and the Towns brothers.

The Title Race had an unusual extra dimension in that the winner was to be chosen to represent New South Wales against Ned Hanlan who was champion of Great Britain and the United States. The course was again on the Parramatta River but this time the distance was about three and three-quarter miles. Laycock had previously beaten Trickett so his backers had high hopes of taking the Championship which was for £200 a side. The water was smooth and the weather splendid and the tide was just on the turn as the men started. Laycock took an early lead but by four hundred yards Trickett had passed him and was never tested for the rest of the race, winning "as he liked" by some fifteen to eighteen lengths. The time was 22m.38s which was the second best time ever recorded in Australia. Trickett had used the then new invention of swivel rowlocks.

== Third defence ==
On 15 November 1880 on a decidedly raw and cold day with a drizzling rain that fell at intervals; Trickett, weighing 12 st 5 lb (78 kg or 173 lb) and 6 ft 4 in tall, aged 29 years rowed against the 5 ft 8 in tall Edward ‘Ned’ Hanlan weighing 10 st 12 lb (73 kg or 153 lb) aged 25 years of Toronto Canada over the Thames Championship Course which ran between Putney and Mortlake. Both men and their supporters had travelled to England for the match. There was heavy betting on the race. Harry Kelley piloted the Australian, and Bright performed the same office for Hanlan, but the race seemed to be over before they reached Hammersmith Bridge. Trickett lost the race to the Canadian in a time of 26 minutes-12 seconds and three lengths behind, and thus he lost his World Title. The Stake was £400.

== Final title race ==
Hanlan disposed of two more challengers before accepting a further challenge from Trickett. This race took place on 1 May 1882, again on the Championship Course on the Thames. Trickett used a new boat weighing only twenty-nine pounds. The stake was £500 a side. However, the race was very one sided and Hanlan won so far ahead that he then turned around and rowed back to Trickett, turned around again and beat him a second time to the finish line. Hanlan was well known for these sorts of pranks which often humiliated his opponents, although he was one of the greatest rowers of his age. Trickett returned to Australia and in 1884 he moved to the Oxford Arms Hotel in Rockhampton, Queensland. It is rumoured an admirer had apparently given him the hotel. In 1888 he raced his old foe Edward Hanlan on the Fitzroy River. Some 10,000 spectators watched Ned Trickett, then aged 36–37, be beaten and lose his money on this race.

== Life after rowing ==
The economic downturn in the early 1890s caused Ned to lose his hotel. He returned to Sydney to find employment but was deeply depressed - to the point of being suicidal. In September 1893 he began work as a tide waiter with the New South Wales Customs Department. Trickett seemingly found religion after having been duck shooting on the Sabbath. It is reputed that he changed his ways and became a teetotaller. Or he found religion whilst wandering the streets of Sydney which gave him the strength to continue and then, through Salvation Army contacts, he obtained employment in the Customs Services.

He lived and worked at Moama on the Murray River in New South Wales for some time and his family remained in Sydney. His work then reverted to Sydney. He remained a committed Salvation Army envoy throughout the rest of his life and became a good speaker for their cause.

Nearing his retirement, Ned visited his son Fred at Uralla in New South Wales. Fred ran the General Store and was mining gold as a hobby. Trickett helped Fred work the shaft until tragedy struck on 27 November 1916 when the walls of the gold mine shaft collapsed. Trickett died of the injuries.

He is buried in the Uralla cemetery. A memorial to him was erected by the public subscription at Uralla in 1918. At Surfers Paradise, Qld, is a street named after Trickett. Trickett Street is nearby those named after other rowers, vis Beach Road, Hanlan Street, and Laycock Street.
