= Hogmoor Inclosure =

Wooded heathland in Hampshire

- Site of Special Scientific Interest
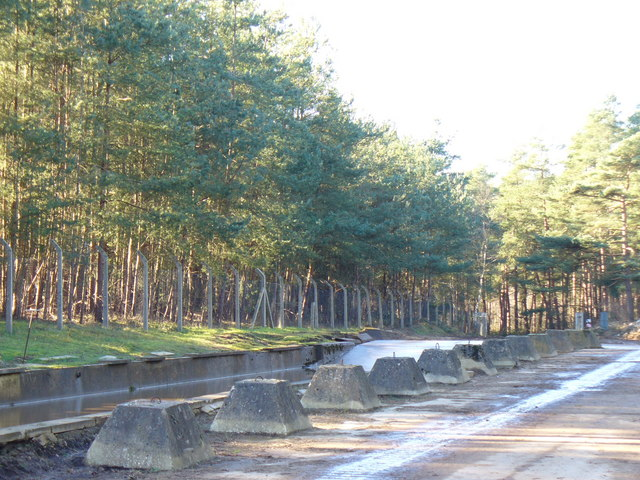
- Tank crossing at Hogmoor Inclosure

- Location within Hampshire
- Location of Hogmoor Inclosure.
- Area of search: Hampshire
- Grid reference: SU7887934956
- Coordinates: 51.108480°N 0.874640°W
- Interest: Army
- Area: 768 ha (1,900 acres)
- Notification date: 1889

Hogmoor Inclosure is a large area of wooded heath situated 0.5 miles (0.80 km) west from the town of Bordon and within the civil parish of Whitehill in the East Hampshire district of Hampshire, England. The inclosure is used for army training with various tank crossings scattered around the area. The area is historically notable for its connection with the British Army with large barracks surrounding the area.

The inclosure was first scouted in 1896 by the Highland Light Infantry with camps being built in the area in 1903.

== History ==
Before Bordon was being built as an army camp by the Royal Engineers, the whole area surrounding Whitehill and Greatham was made up of woodland which is known as present day Woolmer Forest. A Roman road led through the Hogmoor Inclosure to Longmoor and Longmoor Military Camp which connects to present day Longmoor Road. The inclosure was first being used as an army camp in 1903 and to the present day it is still being used by the British Army and the Longmoor Army Ranges. However, the camp was first used by the Somersetshire Light Infantry in 1904 in which they had returned from the Second Boer War.

However, in 2010 Bordon announced its intention to become an Eco Town. The Ministry of Defence has decided to relocate armed forces training from the Hogmoor Inclosure to St Athan in South Wales. This will put the 768 acre inclosure at risk of being built on.
