= Robert Coombes (rower) =

- Born: 1808; England
- Died: 1860 (aged 51–52)
- Title: World champion sculler
- Term: 1846-1851
- Predecessor: Charles Campbell (Oarsman)
- Successor: Tom Cole (Oarsman)

Robert Coombes (1808 – 25 February 1860), celebrated professional oarsman and Champion Sculler, was born at Vauxhall, London.

== Early life ==
A waterman from an early age, Coombes spent his life on the river Thames. Although small even for his time (he was about 5-foot-7-inch (1.70 m) tall and his rowing weight was generally less than 9 stone), Coombes consistently beat men who were his superiors in strength and size through his superior skill and attentive training.

His first public race was for the Duke of Northumberland's purse of sovereigns on 4 July 1836. In 1841, Coombes in a sculling boat beat a two pairs boat at the Greennock Regatta. His principal sculling matches were against Kipping, John Kelley, Jack Phelps, Charles Campbell, Tom Cole, Tom MacKinning, Robert Newell, and Henry Clasper, and his most important pair oared raced was rowed with his brother, Tom Coombes, as a partner against the two Claspers.

In sculling Coombes beat the majority of the best professional scullers on the circuit. On 3 October 1888, he beat John Kelley from Westminster to Putney but as Kelley had had a small accident during the race they agreed to meet again the following day, when Kelley was beaten easily. This was the first professional match without fouling of which there is any record.

== Crew races ==
Coombes rowed as well as sculled and as an oarsman his achievements were also numerous, both in fours and pairs. Some of these races are as follows; Won with J Phelps an oars match, Westminster to Putney, 30 Sept 1839, beating another pair. Won a four oar match, rowing stroke, the Champion Purse, against Liverpool July 1840. The four were known as "The Sons of the Thames." Nearly the same four won the first prize of 1000 franks at the Havre Regatta in July 1840. Coombes rowing stroke in the London crew of four beat a Newcastle crew for £150 a side, over five miles, at Newcastle. Time 29m.31s. 16 July 1842. Again rowing stroke he and three others took the purse at the Henley Regatta in June 1845. At the Thames Regatta the same month Coombes and Wilson beat a number of pairs for the grand prize of a new wherry and a purse of sixty guineas. In 1847 Coombes and his brother Thomas beat R & H Clasper in a pair-oared match with coxswains and for £100 a side on the Thames. The Coombes and Clasper brothers were not always rivals as the four teamed up, with another Clasper as cox, to win the four-oared Champion prize in 1849.

== Title races ==
In November 1838 he challenged champion Charles Campbell but did not succeed in winning. However he became the Champion of the Thames on 19 August 1846 after beating Charles Campbell easily on the Putney to Mortlake course, known as the Championship Course. Effectively this was the Championship of England. Before 1876, the English Sculling Championship was considered to be the premier event in professional sculling. In 1876, the English Title gained the World status and earlier winners were retrospectively given the title of World Champion. His first defence of the Title was on 19 September 1847. He won against Robert Newell, again on the Championship Course. The second defence was against Thomas MacKinney on 7 May 1851 on the Thames. Coombes won in a time of 27m.30s. He held the championship longer and rowed the championship course faster than any other man of his time; but on 24 May 1852 when aged 43 he was beaten by half length of clear water by Tom Cole (Oarsman), of Chelsea, who at 25 was almost half Coombes' age. The patrons of Coombes were unhappy with the race and arranged another race on 14 October 1852. It came off with the same result and Coombes was finally compelled to yield his title to the youthful strength of his challenger.

For details of the six World Title races that Coombes was involved in see World Sculling Championship.

In speed and style during his time, he was never surpassed and rowed many more races than any man except Harry Clasper.

== Rowing coach ==
Coombes's expertise attracted the attention of the university oarsmen. He trained the losing Oxford crew for the 1840 Boat Race and the victorious Cambridge boat in the 1846 There were two races in 1849, and Coombes coached Cambridge on both occasions: Cambridge won the first but lost the second. When he was asked to coach the 1852 Cambridge crew, Coombes found himself at the centre of a fierce argument about the use of professional watermen in the training of university oarsmen. Oxford had expressed disquiet on the issue in 1846 and 1849 but on this occasion T. S. Egan, for many years the mentor of Cambridge rowing, was also concerned at Coombes's presence and defected to Oxford, where he trained a crew that won the boat race with ease. It was a decisive moment for certain amateur oarsmen, mainly those from the universities and the more important metropolitan clubs, who subsequently tried to distance themselves from the professionals and any oarsmen of working-class origin. Coombes was never again involved with a boat race crew but he explained his training methods at the end of a small volume published in 1852, Aquatic Notes or Sketches of the Rise and Progress of Racing at Cambridge by a member of CUBC.

== Family life ==
Coombes was married with four children. His sons Thomas and David were also oarsmen but failed to reach the level of success attained by his father, although David won the Doggett's Coat and Badge race in 1864.

== Death and memorial ==
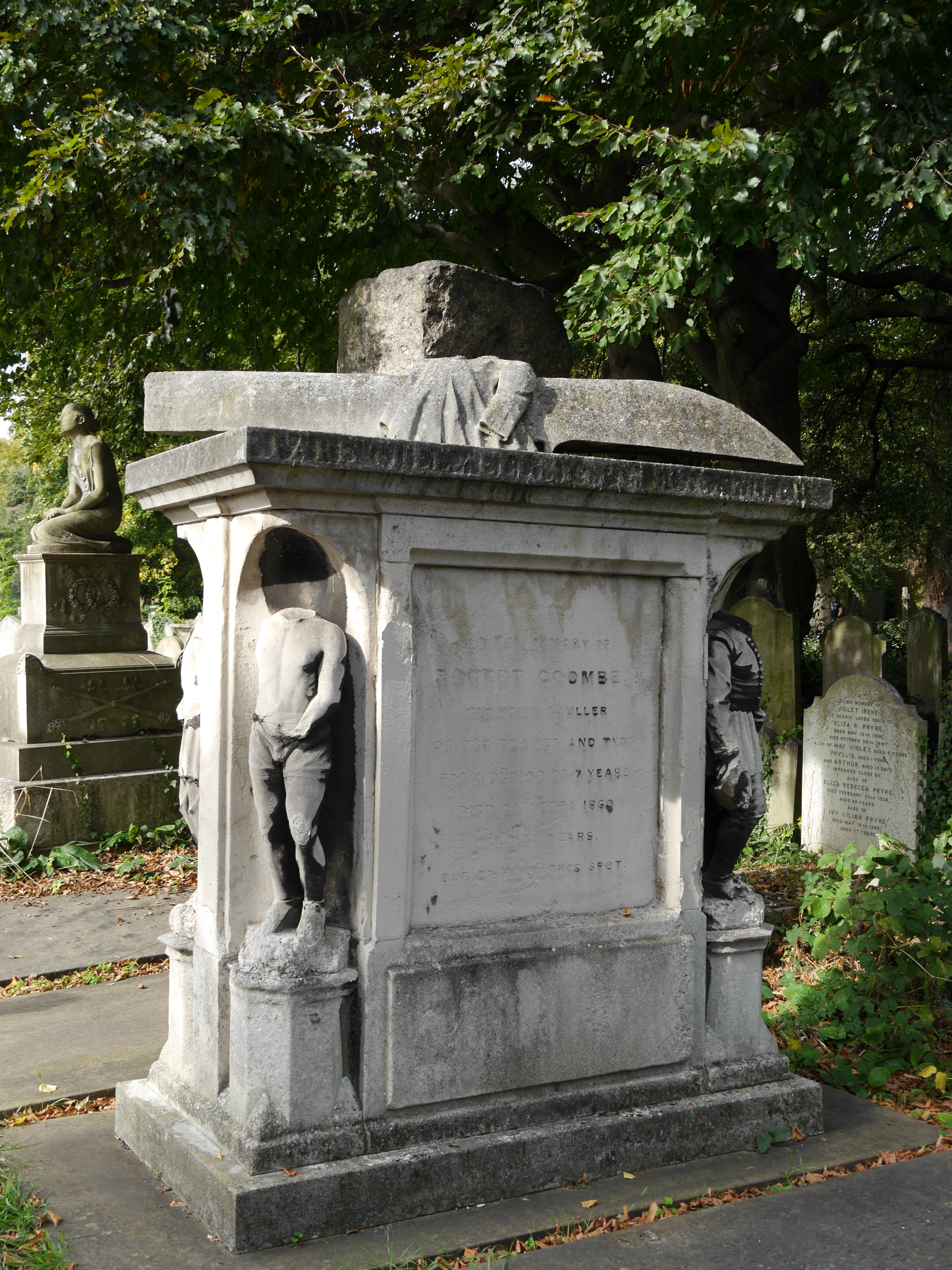
Brompton Cemetery monument

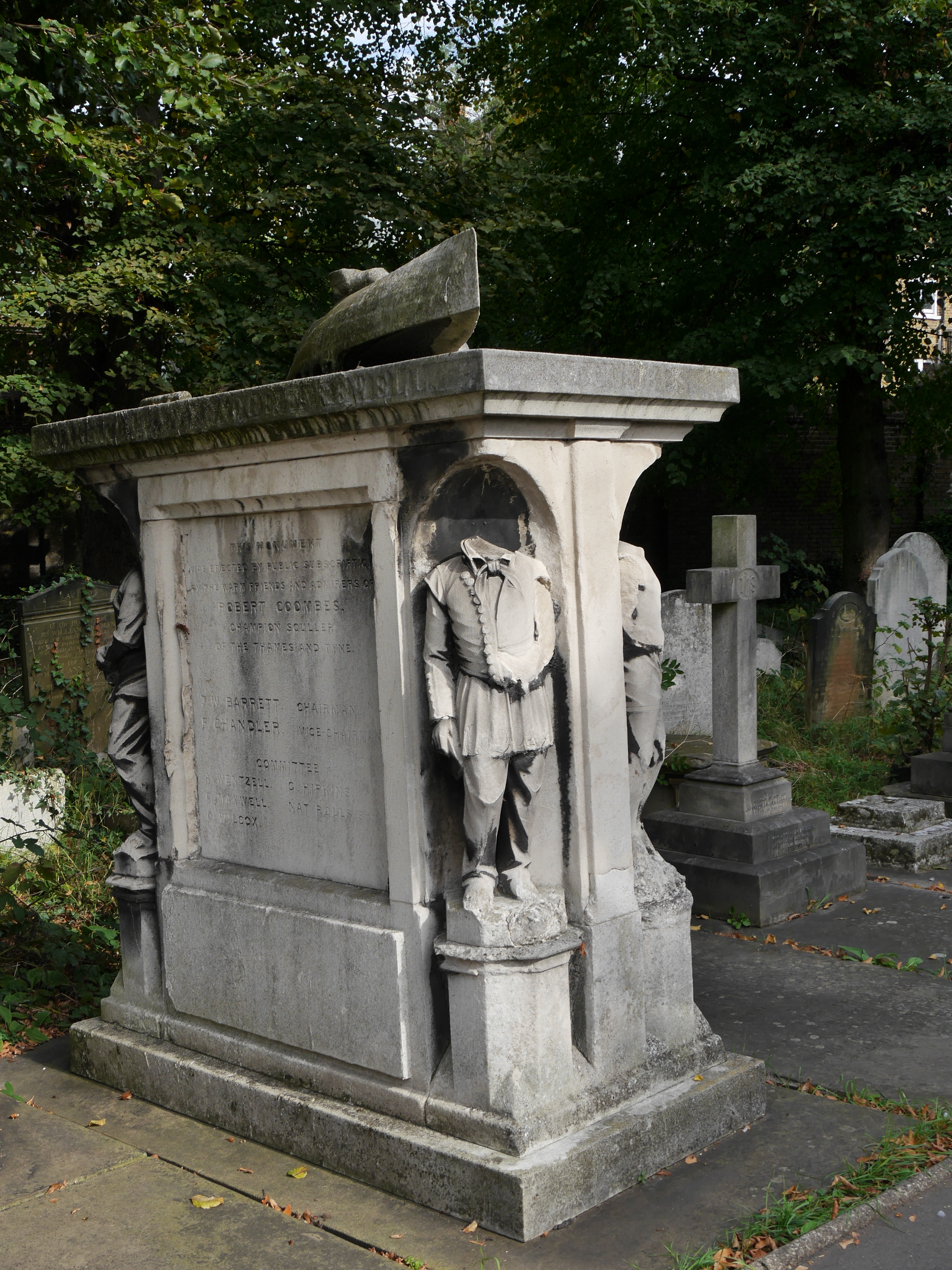
Brompton Cemetery monument

After an honourable career, in his later days he fell into poverty. His mind failed and he was removed nine months before his death to the Kent lunatic asylum at Maidstone where he died on 25 February 1860 and was buried at the expense of his friends at Brompton Cemetery on 7 March, when the leading watermen followed his remains to the grave.

On 13 December 1866 the monument (which can be seen in the gallery beneath the Brompton Cemetery monograph, to this well-known oarsman, who was Champion of the Thames from 1846 to 1852, was formally uncovered in Brompton Cemetery. It is made of Portland stone, and is 9 ft. high, 6 ft. 6in. long, and 3 ft. 6in. wide. On the top slab is the representation of a wherry bottom upwards, over which is thrown a coat and badge, and by the side are broken sculls. This slab is supported by four figures cut out of the solid stonework, one at each corner. The figures represent four champions of the Thames : first, Robert Coombes, in his rowing costume, holding a broken scull; second, Tom Cole, of Chelsea, wearing Doggett's Coat and Badge, with the peculiar pineapple button; third, James Messenger, of Kingston, with the coat and badge of the Thames National Regatta; fourth, Harry Kelley, of Putney, an athlete in rowing costume. Each figure stands on an octagon dwarf pedestal.

The inscription reads:

This monument was erected by public subscription
by the warm friends and admirers of
ROBERT COOMBES
Champion Sculler of the Thames and Tyne
