= Longmoor =

Longmoor may refer to several places:

- Long Moor, Berkshire, a heathland surrounded by California Country Park
- Longmoor, Hampshire, a place in England, the location of:
  - Longmoor Military Camp, a British army camp
  - Longmoor Military Railway, connected the army camp to the mainline rail network
- Longmoor, Ontario, a place in Canada
