= Joseph Sadler =

British rower

Joseph Henry Sadler
- Born: Joseph Henry Sadler c. 1839; Putney
- Died: c. 1889
- Other name: Joe Sadler
- Title: World champion sculler
- Term: 1871–1876
- Predecessor: James Renforth
- Successor: Edward Trickett

Joseph Henry Sadler (c. 1839 – c. 1889) was a British professional rower who twice won the World Sculling Championship. Before 1876, the English Sculling Championship was considered to be the premier event in professional sculling. In 1876, the English Title gained the World status and earlier winners were retrospectively given the title of World Champion.

== English Sculling Championship record ==
Sadler, who lived in London and worked as a chimney-sweep, rowed his first great match in 1865, at the Thames Regatta Sculls. His opponent was T. Hoare, who was reputed the second greatest contemporary oarsman after English sculling champion Harry Kelley, of whom Sadler was a pupil. Sadler won easily, and the following year on 22 November 1866, contested the English Sculling Championship against Robert Chambers. Kelley, Sadler's mentor, had retired that year, leaving the championship title an open race between Sadler and Chambers. Halfway through the race Sadler seemed to have the measure of his opponent, but Chambers took the lead and did not relinquish it.

In 1867 Kelley returned from retirement, and, on 6 May, sculled Chambers for the Championship on the River Tyne. Kelley won easily. The same year Sadler beat Kelley at the Paris International Regatta, but was disqualified for a foul. This created animosity between the two, which was to have a profound effect.

=== 1867 court case ===
The next race between Kelley and Sadler took place on 28 November 1867, an English Championship decider at £300 a side. Kelley came home first but a foul had occurred, and the referee was unable to decide which party was in the wrong. He accordingly ordered the two to row again the next day. The articles of the match provided for a start by 'mutual consent', and somehow Sadler did not consent at any moment when Kelley was ready. Strong opinions were expressed by several persons who watched the affair from the steamers, and eventually the referee ordered Kelley to row over the course. The stakes were awarded to Kelley by the referee, but Sadler brought an action against the stakeholder, M. J. Smith, then proprietor of The Sportsman newspaper.

The case became a cause célèbre. The Court decided that the referee had acted ultra vires in awarding the stakes to Kelley, inasmuch as he had not first taken the trouble to observe for himself Sadler's manoeuvres at the starting post. He had formed his opinion from hearsay and separate statements. The case was decided in favour of Sadler, although history does not record that he also gained the title.

=== Later races ===
In November 1868, James Renforth beat Kelley to the Championship, but died in 1871 without having defended the title. During the period of Renforth's championship Sadler had successfully rowed in the United States during 1870; on Renforth's death he was deemed the best remaining sculler, but could not claim the title without a race. It was arranged that he row R. Bagnall, a Tyne rower, and the two raced on 16 April 1874 on the Championship Course. The distance was 4ml.300yds and the time was 24m.15s. Sadler won and was therefore World Champion.

Sadler's next Championship race, on 15 November 1875, was against R.W. Boyd of Durham, to whom Sadler had previously lost by three-quarters of a length in a mile race on the Tyne. The championship race was held on the Putney to Mortlake course and the stake was £200 aside. Boyd darted away and soon took a long lead but then faded. Sadler rowed steadily, overtook his opposition, and went on to win very comfortably in a time of 28m.05s. Sadler announced he would not return to training suggesting that the race would have been his last. However, his actual final Championship race came on 27 June 1876, when he lost to Edward Trickett in 24m.35s. After an even start Trickett took a three lengths lead, which Sadler was unable to recover. This was the first Championship race rowed on sliding seats.(see Harry Clasper (section Sliding seats)). The race became known as the World Championship at this point as Trickett was the first non-British contestant to win. Sadler was reported to have retired after this race but he must have continued some later training. On 5 November 1877 he and Harry Kelley, his old foe, raced over the Putney to Mortlake course for a stake of £400. After an even start Sadler went ahead and was never passed, with a time of 24m.02s. After the race Kelley rowed over to Sadler and shook hands to the cheers of the onlookers.

== Crew races ==
As well as his many single sculling races, Sadler was during 1865 and 1866 a member of the Sons of the Thames crew who won the Thames Champion Fours. In 1869, he competed in the same event for the Surbiton crew.

== Coaching ==
Sadler coached the Kingston Rowing Club in the eights in 1880.
