= James Messenger =

Sculling champion and ship builder (1826-1901)

James Arthur Messenger
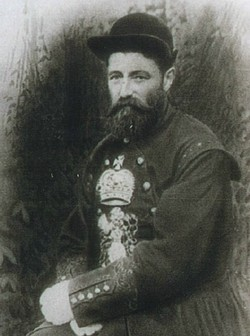
- Born: 26 February 1821; Twickenham
- Died: 21 June 1901 (aged 80)
- Title: World Champion sculler, Professional
- Term: 1854–1857
- Predecessor: Tom Cole
- Successor: Harry Kelley

James Arthur Messenger (26 February 1826 – 21 June 1901) was a British sculler who was the world champion from 1854 to 1857. He served as the Queen's Bargemaster from 1862 to 1901. He resided in Teddington. In 1854 he became the Champion of the Thames which was effectively the English Sculling Championship and the World Sculling Championship. The English title gained the world status in 1876, earlier winners were retrospectively given the world champion title. In 1862 he won the famed Doggett's Coat and Badge, which claims to be the oldest sporting championship in the world. There is some confusion as to whether James Messenger who won the World Sculling Championship in 1854 is the same person, recorded as John Messenger of Cherry Garden Stairs, who won the Doggett's Coat and Badge in 1862.

== Early races ==
At the Thames Regatta in July 1847 Messenger won the apprentice's coat and silver badge presented by Evan Morris. In the final he defeated Tom Cole, JG Cole, and S Williams.

At the 1848 regatta, he and three others were beaten in a four-oar race by the Claspers (see Harry Clasper) for the Champion Prize. However, at the 1849 event he was successful in winning the final of the Scullers Prize and £50. The regatta was discontinued but at its replacement, the Thames Boat Races of 1850, he came third in the single sculls race which was a closely contested affair.

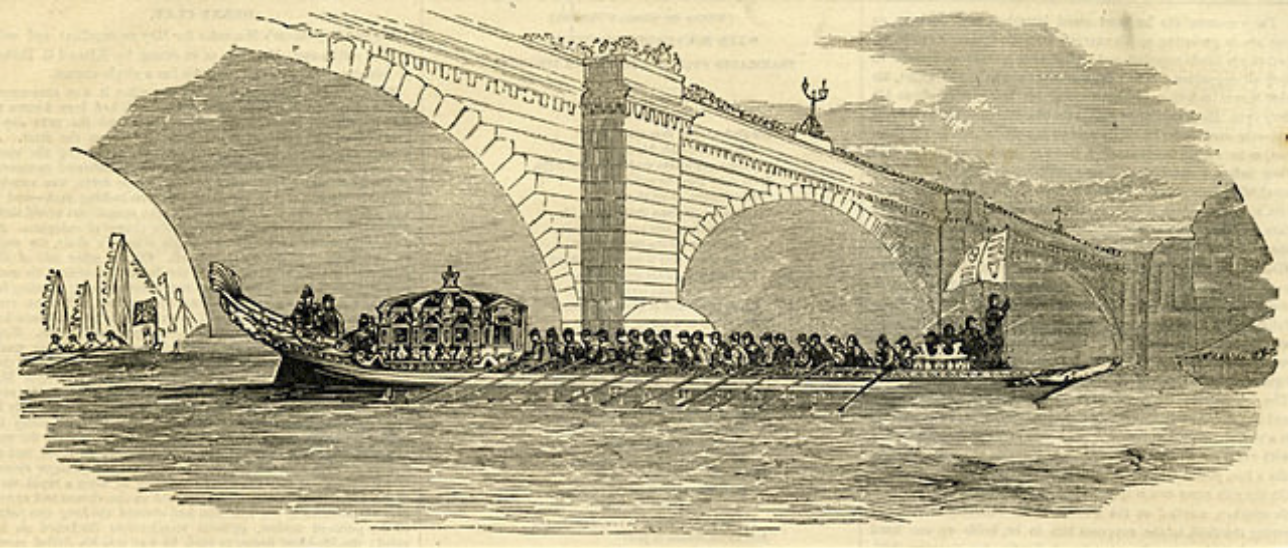
Queen Victoria's Royal Barge. This would have been the barge of which James was the Master in his service from 1862 to 1901. The photo is of an etching created in 1854.

On 23 August 1853 Messenger rowed against James Candish, who was the Tyne Champion, on the Thames river Putney to Mortlake course (the Championship Course) for a £100 a side. Messenger defeated Candish with great ease by about a boat length and he covered the distance in 24 minutes 26 seconds after having been stopped twice on the course. A return match was arranged and this was raced on the Tyne on 14 March 1854. Messenger had an easy victory crossing the line more than half a minute ahead.

== First title race ==
The backers of Messenger were pleased with his performance and a challenge was made to Tom Cole for the Championship of the Thames. The agreed stake was £200 a side and the race was run on 20 November 1854 on the usual Championship Course. The day was foggy and cold. Cole took the early lead and retained it to Crab Tree at which point Messenger began to gradually overhaul him. By Hammersmith Bridge, Messenger had obtained a good lead which he maintained with ease to the finish. The time was 24 minutes 45 seconds. His details at this time were given as height 5 ft 7.5 in (1.71 m), and weight 10 st 8 lb (67 kg).

== Second title race ==
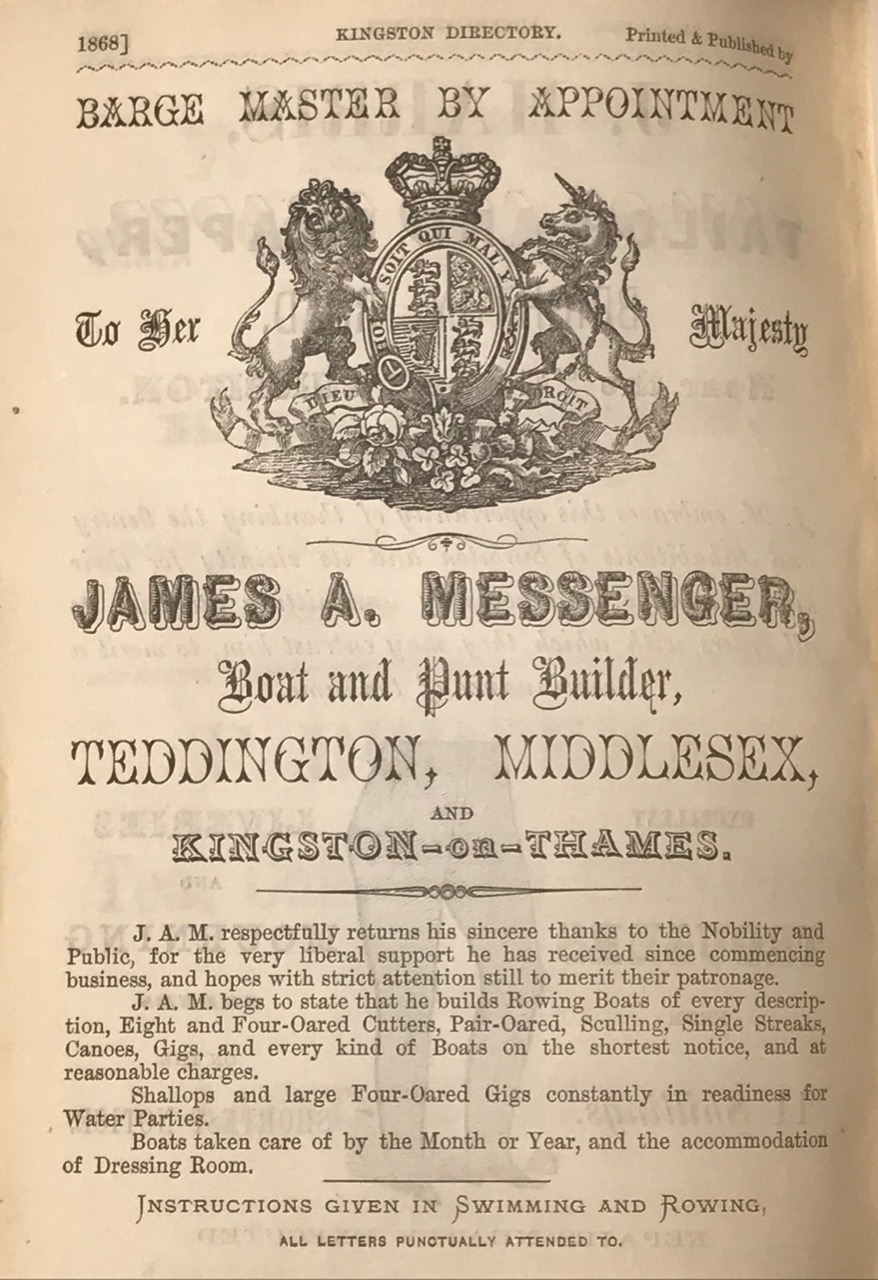
James A. Messenger advertisement in the Kingston Directory of 1868 asserting he was Barge Master to Queen Victoria. The Barge Master to the Queen was considered the most eminent of the Queen's watermen.The image was provided by the Kingston History Centre.

A vast crowd was on hand to watch the race between Messenger and Harry Kelley on 12 May 1857. Every public vantage point along the Putney and Fulham to Mortlake and Chiswick course was taken up by spectators. Messenger rowed in a boat of his own construction and was piloted by Thomas MacKinney who had in 1851 been contender for the title, losing to Robert Coombes.

The race was started by mutual consent; a common method at the time. However, there was no "foxing" or "gamesmanship" by either party as was often the case and the men got away promptly and fairly. Just after the start Kelley was perceptibly in front but after a dozen or so strokes Messenger looked like he was recovering the lost ground. Eager shouts from the crowd encouraged him but the spurt did not last long and by Finch's he had begun to fall astern. At Rose Bank, Kelley was more than a length ahead and he increased his lead so that by Hammersmith Bridge, reached in nine minutes, he was four or five lengths ahead. By Barnes Railway Bridge the distance between the men had doubled and although both men were partially stopped by skiffs it made no difference to the result. Kelley crossed the line in 24 minutes 30 seconds. See also World Sculling Championship.

== Life after racing ==
James Messenger was a boatbuilder in Teddington. He built the Lady Alice for H. M. Stanley's second African journey.

James' son, Charles A. Messenger was a professional single sculler in Sydney around 1881. A grandson, Herbert Henry, known as Dally Messenger, was a good cricketer, sailor, and a champion canoeist, but became best known as a rugby league footballer.

== Sources ==
- “The Aquatic Oracle or Record of Rowing from 1835 to 1851” published 1852.
- The New York Clipper 13 June 1857.
- Professional World Rowing History https://web.archive.org/web/20110217091832/http://www.rowinghistory-aus.info/world-pro-sculling/index.php
- Australian Biography https://adb.anu.edu.au/biography/messenger-herbert-henry-dally-7562
- Fascinating History of the original Messenger Boathouse at 27 Ferry Rd, Teddington http://www.teddsoc-wiki.org.uk/wiki/index.php?title=Ferry_Road_27,_%22The_Boathouse%22
