= Wearside =

Wearside Sunderland Built-up area
- Built-up area
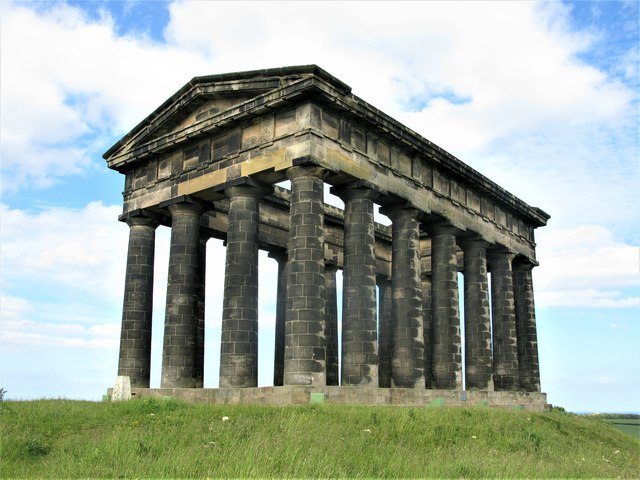
- The Penshaw Monument

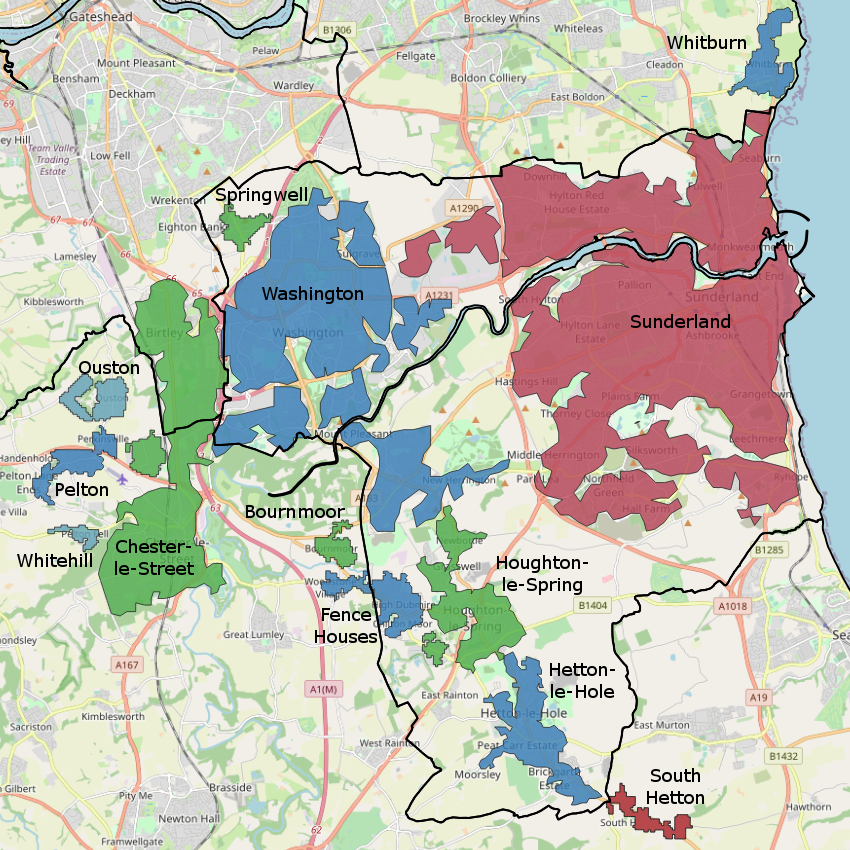
- Sunderland Built-up area's sub divisions

- Location of Wearside in northern England
- Coordinates: 54°54′14″N 1°22′52″W
- Sovereign state: United Kingdom
- Country: England
- Region: North East
- Sub divisions: List: Sunderland; Washington; Houghton-le-Spring; Chester-le-Street; Hetton-le-Hole; Whitburn; Fence Houses; Bournmoor; South Hetton; Springwell Village; Ouston; Pelton; Birtley

Population (2011)
  - Total: 335,415
- Demonym(s): Mackem; Wearsider
- Time zone: GMT (UTC)
  - Summer (DST): UTC+1 (BST)

Wearside (/ˈwɪərsaɪd/) is a built-up area in County Durham and Tyne and Wear, England. It is named after the River Wear which flows through it and traditionally all in the County of Durham.

In the 2011 census, its official name was the Sunderland Built-up area since Sunderland is its largest part, the urban area extends to the surrounding City of Sunderland district, small parts of County Durham district and a small part of the Metropolitan Borough of Gateshead.

Notable towns in the urban area include Birtley, Chester le Street, Hetton le Hole, Houghton le Spring and Washington.

== Economy ==
Like other parts of the North East, Wearside and Sunderland were economically structured by the primary and secondary sector of the economy; with a great deal of the economy once dependent on ship building at Sunderland Docks and coal mining with large collieries such as Monkwearmouth Colliery, which declined rapidly during the mid 20th century, many areas have long been deprived with vast areas of unemployment as a result. The city of Sunderland and parts of Wearside have been slowly rejuvenated over the years and industry is now largely based around call centres, although many areas such as Easington Colliery still face social problems today.

== Media ==
Serving Wearside, the Sunderland Echo newspaper is sold throughout the area and online. Local commercial radio is broadcast by 103.4 Sun FM for Wearside and 107 Spark FM for the City of Sunderland.

== Sport ==
The Wearside Football League is one of the levels in the English football league system and contains amateur teams such as Easington Colliery A.F.C. and Seaham Red Star F.C. The only professional football team located in the area is Sunderland A.F.C., a team based in Sunderland.

== Sub-divisions ==
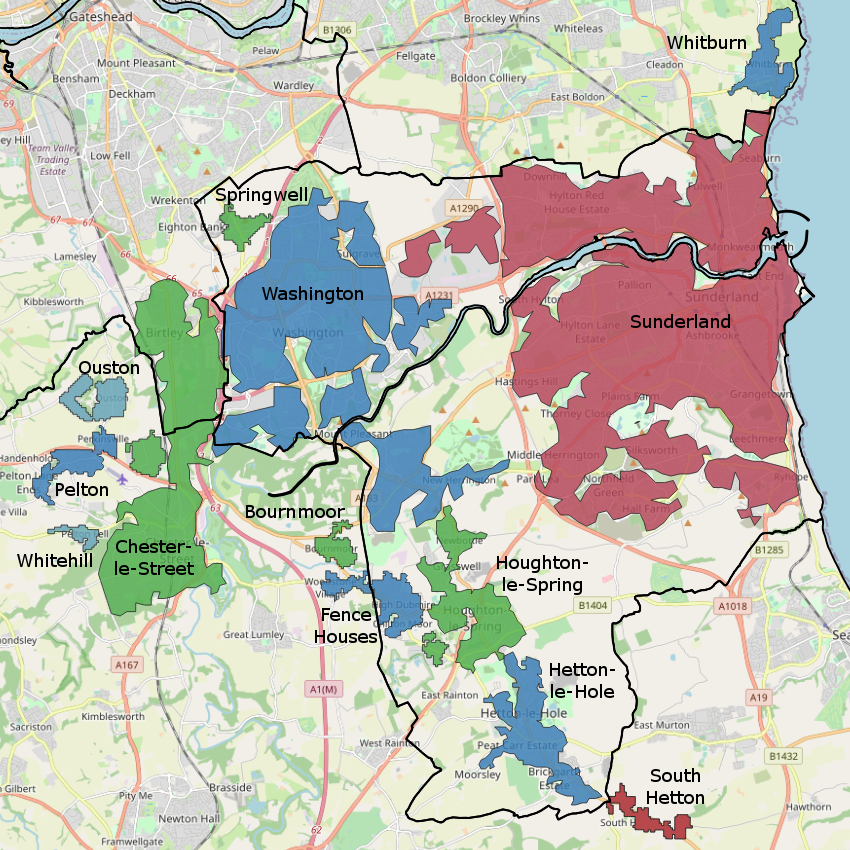
Wearside Urban Area map, showing subdivisions and local authority boundaries

According to the ONS definition the Wearside Built-up area (previously "Urban area") had the following subdivisions. Note that these are "Built-up areas subdivisions" as defined by the Office for National Statistics and will have different boundaries from the settlements after which they are named.

| # | Sub-area name | Population (2011) |
|---|---|---|
| 1 | Sunderland | 174,286 |
| 2 | Washington | 67,085 |
| 3 | Chester-le-Street | 37,164 |
| 4 | Houghton-le-Spring | 13,863 |
| 5 | Hetton-le-Hole | 12,127 |
| 6 | Birtley | 8,367 |
| 7 | Fence Houses | 6,649 |
| 8 | Ouston | 5,303 |
| 9 | Pelton | 5,278 |
| 10 | Whitburn | 5,102 |
| 11 | South Hetton | 3,032 |
| 12 | Bournmoor | 2,082 |
| 13 | Springwell | 2,074 |
| 14 | Whitehill | 1,370 |
| – | Total | 335,415 |

== See also ==
- Tyneside
- North East Green Belt
- North East Combined Authority
- County Durham
- Weardale
