= Tyneside =

- Built-up area
- The River Tyne between Gateshead and Newcastle

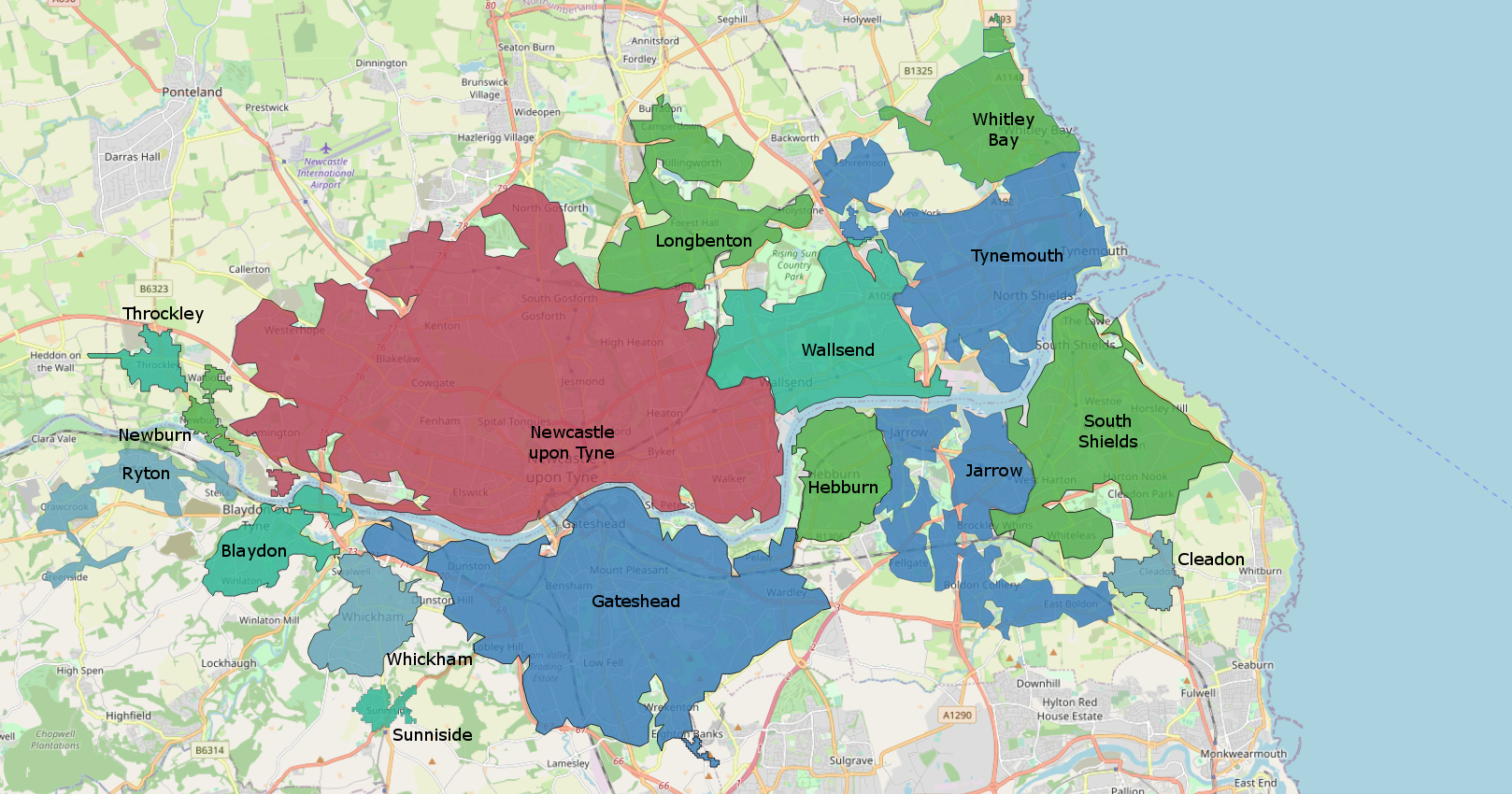
- Built-up area's sub divisions

- Location of Tyneside in northern England
- Coordinates: 54°59′15″N 1°27′30″W
- Sovereign state: United Kingdom
- Country: England
- Region: North East
- County: Tyne and Wear

Population (2011)
  - Total: 774,891
- Demonym(s): Geordie; Tynesider
- Time zone: GMT (UTC)
  - Summer (DST): UTC+1 (BST)

Pronounced in General Northern English

Tyneside is a built-up area across the banks of the River Tyne in Northern England. The population of Tyneside as published in the 2011 census was 774,891. Tyneside is made up of the metropolitan boroughs of Newcastle upon Tyne, Gateshead, North Tyneside and South Tyneside. The area is surrounded by the North East Green Belt. Residents of the area are commonly referred to as Geordies.

== Settlements ==
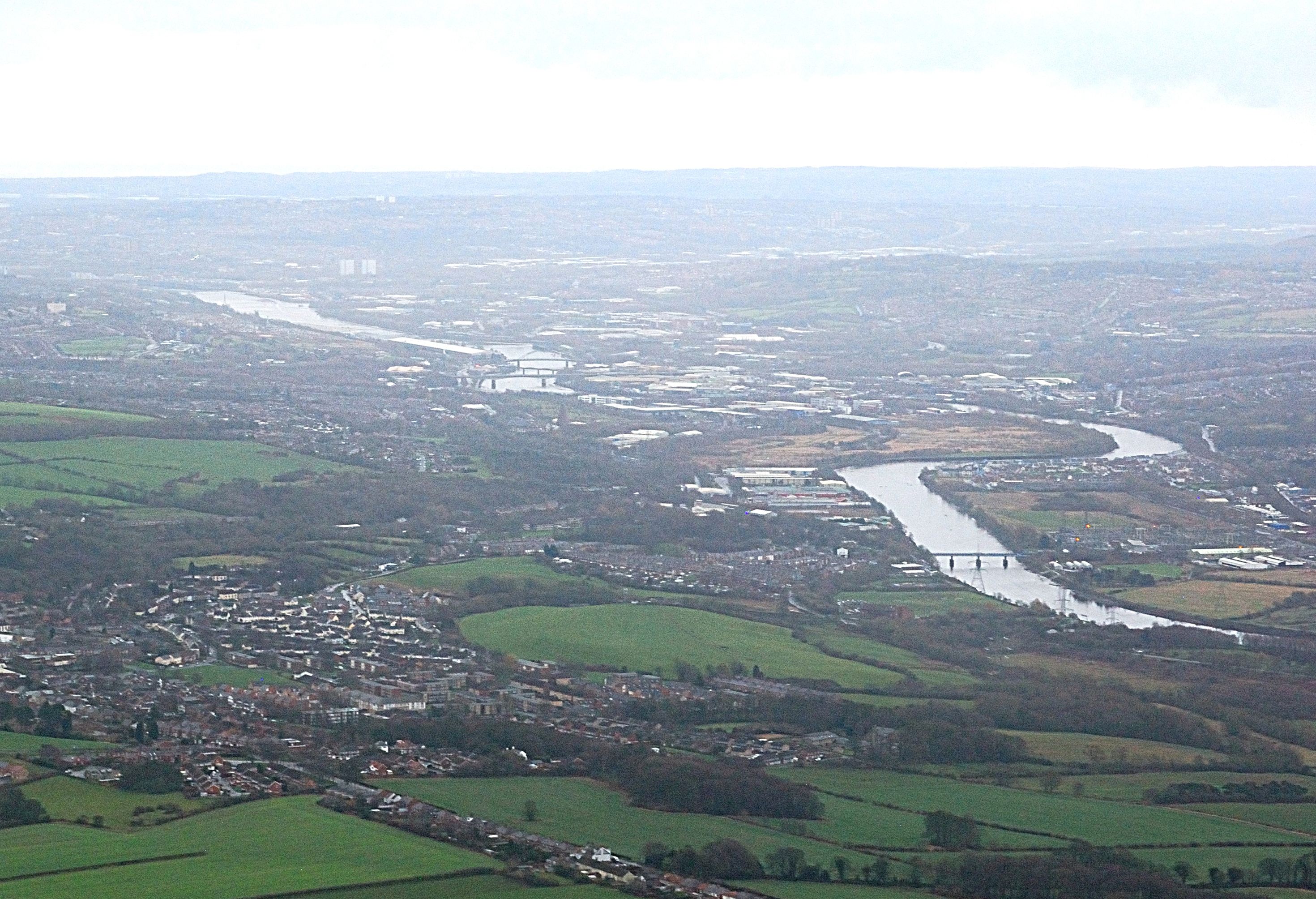
Aerial view of Tyneside which includes North Tyneside, Metropolitan Borough of Gateshead, parts of South Tyneside and parts of Northumberland

The ONS 2011 census had 774,891 census respondents inside the "Tyneside Built-up Area" or "Tyneside Urban Area". These figures are a decline from 879,996; this loss was mainly due to the ONS reclassifying Hetton-le-Hole, Houghton-le-Spring, Chester-le-Street and Washington in the Wearside Built-up Area instead of Tyneside. In both the 2001 and 2011 census the area was given the following subdivisions; Gateshead, Jarrow and Tynemouth had boundary changes:

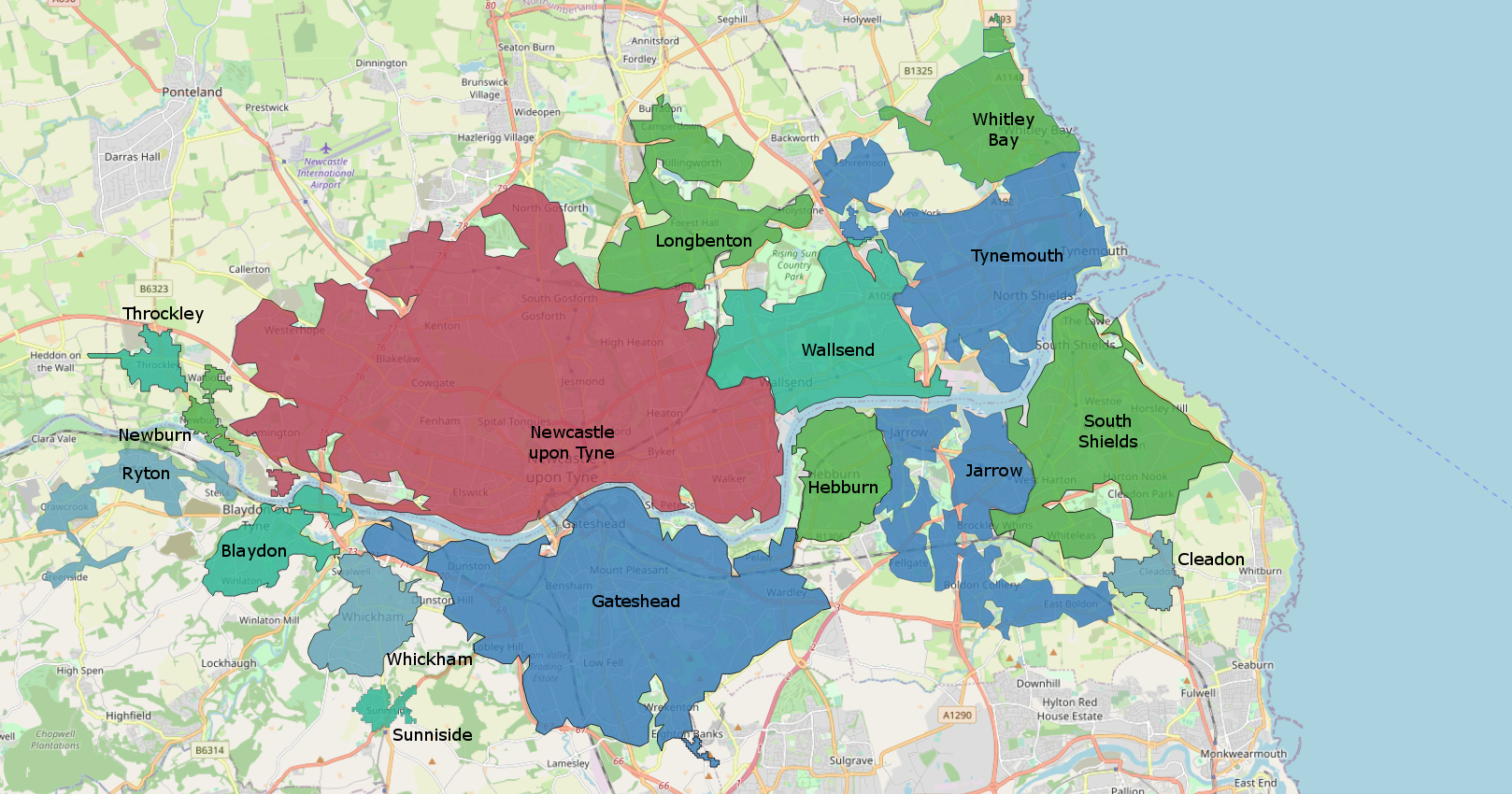
Map of the Tyneside Built-Up Area with subdivisions

Subdivision	Population (2011)	Population (2001)
Newcastle	292,200	259,573
Gateshead	120,046	78,403
South Shields	75,337	82,854
Tynemouth	67,519	17,056
Wallsend	43,826	42,843
Jarrow	43,431	27,525

- Blaydon
- Cleadon
- Hebburn
- Longbenton
- Newburn
- Ryton
- Sunniside
- Throckley
- Whickham
- Whitley Bay

== Geordies ==
The people of Newcastle, called "Geordies", have a reputation for their distinctive dialect and accent. Newcastle may have been given this name, a local diminutive of the name "George", because their miners used George Stephenson's safety lamp (invented in 1815 and called a "Georgie lamp") to prevent firedamp explosions, rather than the Davy lamp used elsewhere. An alternative explanation relates that during the Jacobite risings of 1715 and 1745 the people of Newcastle declared their allegiance to the Hanoverian Kings of Great Britain, George I and George II; whereas the rest of the county of Northumberland, to the north, stood loyal to James Francis Edward Stuart.

== Coal production ==
While Newcastle upon Tyne had been an important local centre since Roman times, and was a major local market town from the Middle Ages, the development of Newcastle and Tyneside is owed to coal mining. Coal was first known to be dug in Tyneside from superficial seams in around 1200, but there is some evidence from Bede's writings that it may have been dug as early as 800 AD. Coal was dug from local drift mines and bell pits, and although initially only used locally, it was exported from the port of Newcastle from the mid 14th century onwards. Tyneside had a strategic advantage as far as the coal trade was concerned, because collier brigs could be loaded with coal on the Tyne and could sail down the east coast to London. In fact, the burgesses of Newcastle formed a cartel, and were known as the Hostmen. The Hostmen were able gain a monopoly over all of the coal exported from Tyneside, a monopoly which lasted a considerable time. A well-known group of workers on the river were the keelmen who handled the keels, boats that carried the coal from the riverbanks to the waiting colliers.

== Steel and shipbuilding ==
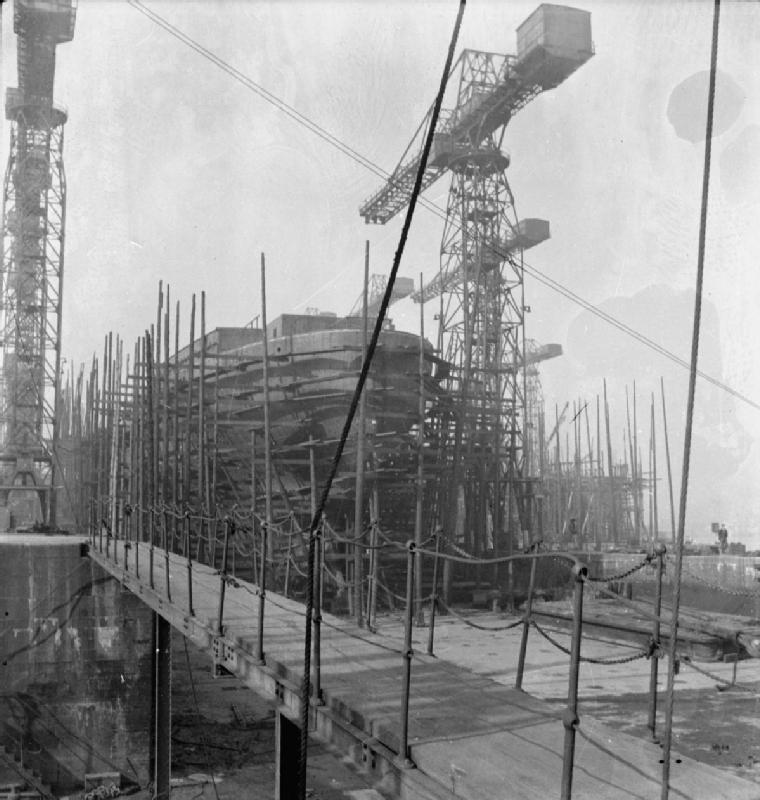
Tyneside shipyards during the Second World War

The Derwent (valley), a major tributary of the Tyne that rises in County Durham, saw the development of the steel industry from around 1600 onwards. This was led by German immigrant cutlers and sword-makers, probably from around Solingen, who fled from religious persecution at home and settled in the then village of Shotley Bridge, near Consett.

The combination of coal and steel industries in the area was the catalyst for further major industrial development in the 19th century, including the shipbuilding industry; at its peak, the Tyneside shipyards were one of the largest centres of shipbuilding in the world and built an entire navy for Japan in the first decade of the 20th century. There is still a working shipyard in Wallsend.

== Professional competitive rowing on the Tyne ==
From early in the 19th century, it was a custom to hold boat races on the Tyne. The Tyne had a large number of keelmen and wherrymen, who handled boats as part of their jobs. As on the River Thames, there were competitions to show who was the best oarsman. As a wherryman did not earn very much, competitive rowing was seen as a quick way of earning extra money. Regattas were held, and provided modest prizes for professionals, but the big money was made in challenge races, in which scullers or boat crews would challenge each other to a race over a set distance for a side stake. The crews would usually have backers, who would put up the stake money, as they saw the chance of financial gain from the race. In the days before mass attendances at football matches, races on the river were enormously popular, with tens of thousands attending. Betting would go on both before and during a race, the odds changing as the fortunes of the contestants changed. Contestants who became champions of the Tyne would often challenge the corresponding champions of the River Thames, and the race would be arranged to take place on one of the two rivers.

Rivalry between the Tyne and the Thames was very keen, and rowers who upheld the honour of the Tyne became local heroes. Three such oarsmen, who came from humble backgrounds and became household names in the North East, were Harry Clasper, Robert Chambers and James Renforth. Clasper was a champion rower in fours, as well as an innovative boat designer and a successful rowing coach. Chambers and Renforth were oarsmen who excelled at sculling. Both held the World Sculling Championship at different times. The popularity of all three men was such that when they died, many thousands attended their funeral processions, and magnificent funeral monuments were provided by popular subscription in all three cases. At the end of the 19th century professional competitive rowing on the Tyne began a gradual decline and would die out entirely leaving the amateur version.

== Rapper dancing ==
Despite its rapid growth in the Industrial Revolution, Tyneside developed one peculiar local custom, the rapper sword dance, which later spread to neighbouring areas of Northumberland and County Durham.

== Industrial decline and regeneration ==
During the 1970s and 1980s, there was major industrial decline in the traditional British heavy industries, and Tyneside was hit hard. High unemployment rates and the national [Thatcher] government's resolve to push through with economic transformation led to great social unrest with strikes and occasional rioting in depressed areas.

From the late 1980s onward, an improving national economy and local regeneration helped the area to recover, and although unemployment is still a problem compared with some other areas of Britain, expansion of new industries such as tourism, science and high-technology, has fuelled local development, especially in Newcastle upon Tyne and Gateshead.

== Economy ==
This is a chart of trend of regional gross value added of Tyneside at current basic prices published by the Office for National Statistics with figures in millions of British pounds sterling.

Year	Regional gross value added (Note: Components may not sum to totals due to rounding)	Agriculture (Note: Includes hunting and forestry)	Industry (Note: Includes energy and construction)	Services (Note: Includes financial intermediation services indirectly measured)
1995	7,688	9	2,244	5,435
2000	9,930	8	2,567	7,356
2003	11,895	9	2,865	9,021
