= Tom Cole (rower) =

- Born: c 1827; England
- Other names: Thomas Cole
- Title: World Champion sculler, Professional
- Term: 1852–1854
- Predecessor: Robert Coombes
- Successor: James Messenger

Tom Cole (born c. 1827) was the Professional Single Sculls World Champion from 1852 to 1854. He resided in Chelsea. At the time, he became the Champion of the Thames which was effectively the Champion of England. After the English title gained world status in 1876, earlier winners were retrospectively given the World Champion Title.

== Early races ==
Cole won the Doggett's Coat and Badge on 1 August 1849. His father, also Tom, had won the Coat and Badge in 1821. In a scratch match on 25 June 1850 the younger Cole was beaten by A Chitty for £25 a side over the Championship Course, that is on the Thames between Putney and Mortlake.

== First title match ==
Cole's first attempt at the Championship was when he challenged Robert Coombes with the match taking place on 24 May 1852. The stake was £200 a side. By this stage Coombes was about forty-four years old and past his prime and although he put a gallant fight to lose by only half a length, the much younger Cole took the prize. The course was the usual Championship Course and the time was 25m.15s.

== Second title match ==
Coombes was still of the opinion that he could again be the Champion and challenged Cole to another match. This took place on the same course on 14 October 1852 and although the time was faster than the previous race at 23m.35s the men crossed the finish line in the same order as the last time.

== Third title match ==
Cole's final Title match was against James Messenger which was raced on 20 November 1854 on the usual Championship Course with a stake of £200 a side. The day was cold and foggy. Cole took the early lead and retained it to the Crab Tree at which point Messenger began to gradually overhaul him. By Hammersmith Bridge Messenger had obtained a good lead which he maintained with ease to the finish. The time was 24m.45s

See also World Sculling Championship and English Sculling Championship.
