= James Renforth =

British rower

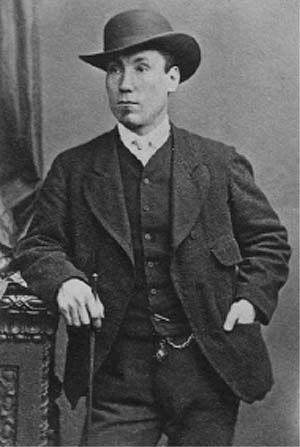
- Renforth
- Born: James Renforth; 7 April 1842; Newcastle upon Tyne, England, United Kingdom
- Died: 23 August 1871 (aged 29); Kennebecasis River, New Brunswick, Canada
- Resting place: Gateshead Cemetery; Gateshead, England, United Kingdom
- Title: World champion sculler
- Term: 1868–1871
- Predecessor: Harry Kelley
- Successor: Joseph Henry Sadler
- Spouse: Mary Ann Bell
- Parent(s): James and Jane Renforth

James Renforth (7 April 1842 – 23 August 1871) was an English Tyneside professional oarsman. He became the World Sculling Champion in 1868 and was one of three great Tyneside oarsmen, the other two being Harry Clasper and Robert Chambers.

== Early history ==
He was born to James and Jane Renforth in New Pandon Street in the Manors district of Newcastle upon Tyne. The year after his birth, his family moved to Rabbit Banks in the Pipewellgate area of Gateshead.

His father was an anchorsmith and the young James became employed as a smith's striker at the age of about 11. The work involved swinging a heavy hammer to strike pieces hot metal of positioned by the smith. The job was physically demanding, but developed his upper body muscles and his stamina, something that served him well in his later career.

There is some doubt over the next stage in his career. There are claims that he joined the army at the age of 21 and travelled abroad. However, other claims state that there is evidence that he remained on Tyneside.

In 1861, he married Mary Ann Bell in Newcastle. In 1862, Mary gave birth to a daughter, Margaret, Jane. They were living at Dean Court, Newcastle. In 1863, Margaret, Jane died of bronchitis. That same year, a second daughter, Ann Elizabeth, was born. The family were living at Tuthill Stairs, Newcastle.

In 1866, Renforth was employed on the demolition of the old Tyne Bridge, ferrying men and materials back and forth. This may have first given him the idea to take up competitive rowing as a means to make more money and help support his wife and child.

In 1868, a third daughter, called Margaret Jane was born; the child died later that year. The family were now living at Church Street, Gateshead.

== Sculling career ==
Renforth made his debut in 1866, in a sculling race and won easily. He won a succession of other sculling races and began to have difficulty in finding opponents who would take him on. He therefore entered several local regattas, which paid smaller prize money. His career took a marked upward turn when he entered for a sculling race at the Thames Regatta in 1868. Renforth won the race, beating Harry Kelley amongst others and received a £90 prize. Tyne crews also won the fours and pairs at the same regatta.

Renforth's victory at the Thames Regatta had catapulted him into prominence as a sculler. Kelley was the current World Sculling Champion and Renforth was the obvious contender, so a match was arranged between the two men. The race was to be over the Putney to Mortlake on the Thames and was to be rowed in November 1868. Renforth trained hard for the race and, in the event, won it easily, by four lengths. He became the new World Champion, a title he held until his death in 1871. See also English Sculling Championship.

== Later career ==
In 1869, Renforth became the landlord of the Belted Will Inn on Scotswood Road, Newcastle, a career move that both Clasper and Chambers had made before him. After six months, in 1870, he moved on, to take over the Sir Charles Napier Inn, Queen Street, Newcastle.

In July 1870, Clasper died and Renforth was a pall-bearer at his funeral.

Renforth had begun to race in pairs and fours, perhaps because of the difficulty of finding opponents as a sculler. He became stroke of the Tyne Champion Four and, with this crew, defeated a London crew on both the Thames and the Tyne in November 1869. As when he was sculling, Renforth began to have difficulty in finding opponents who would race against him.

== Racing in Canada ==
A challenge was received from Canada to race a crew of four fishermen from Saint John, New Brunswick. This crew had already competed successfully at the Paris Regatta and were known locally and internationally as the "Paris Crew". The challenge was accepted and Renforth's crew travelled to Canada in August 1870. The race was held at Lachine, near Montreal, Quebec, in September, and the Tyne crew won easily. Due to the high level of betting, the Tyne crewmembers made rather a financial killing. They received an enthusiastic reception on their return home.

However, during the preparations for the race there had been a difference of opinion that led to a split within the crew upon their return. Two boats had been taken and whilst Renforth favoured one, the bowman and coach, James Taylor, favoured the other. Renforth had prevailed, but this led to bitterness and so the crew split up, leaving Renforth crewless.

== Final race ==
Renforth promptly formed a new crew, which included his old sculling rival Kelley. In 1871, he accepted another challenge from the Canadians to race in Canada, and the crew prepared to travel to Saint John, New Brunswick. The race was to take place over six miles on the Kennebecasis River. It was rowed on 23 August starting at seven in the morning.

The Saint John crew were first away from the start but were soon half a length down. They started to come back at the English crew and at that point it was noticed that something was wrong with Renforth's rowing. He was swaying from side to side and not producing any effort. He finally collapsed into the lap of the rower behind him. The other crewmembers brought the boat ashore, where he was attended by two doctors but was pronounced dead. His last words were reputed to be, "What will they say in England".

A post-mortem found nothing unusual, but rumours persisted of poison. The most likely cause of his death is heart failure, perhaps brought on by an epileptic seizure. He had been known to collapse with a seizure after a race in the past.

An account of his final race and subsequent death was published in the Newcastle Daily Chronicle on 12 July 1871:

"The Tyne crew won the toss for choice of sides, and took the inside berth. As previously agreed on, Mr. William Oldham acted as umpire for the English crew, and Mr. James Stackhouse filled the same office for the St. John crew. The Honourable Thomas R. Jones (stakeholder) was referee. Everything was in readiness, both crews dashed their oars into the water at the same moment, and, amidst the hushed suspense of the crowd, started on their journey, without either side having obtained the least advantage. At the third stroke the Tyne crew showed three feet ahead, and as they gradually settled down to their work, and pulling in their usual grand style, at less than two hundred yards they had increased their lead to fully half a boat's length.

A few strokes after, to the practised eye of any one familiar with boat-rowing there was manifestly something wrong with Renforth. He appeared to falter and to pull out of stroke. The other members of the crew held gallantly on, and for the next two hundred yards they, notwithstanding Renforth's irregular rowing, maintained their lead of half a length. By the time this point was reached Renforth's condition had told its tale, he was swaying from side to side of the boat. The St. John crew were soon level, and pulling their usual short, rapid stroke with great regularity and precision, they began to forge ahead, and by the time the boats had gone half a mile the Tyne men were nearly three lengths behind.

At this point Kelly called on Renforth to make an effort, and the gallant fellow rowed on with great resolution, but evidently in a sinking condition, till one mile and a quarter of the course had been covered. The oar then dropped from his hand; turning to Kelly he said 'Harry, I have had something,' and then fell backward into the boat. Kelly held the poor champion, while Percy and Chambers rowed the boat to Appleby's Wharf.

Renforth (who was quite insensible when he was landed) was then carried from the boat on the arms of his mates, put into a conveyance, and driven a mile and a half to Claremont House, their training quarters. Here he was laid on his own bed. Kelley took him in his arms, while Percy and I rubbed his feet. We anxiously inquired for a medical man, and mounted messengers were despatched in every direction in search of one. It was quite half an hour before one was found-the most anxious half-hour I ever passed.

Before the doctor arrived, our poor friend had recovered consciousness, and the first words he uttered were, 'It is not a fit I have had-I will tell you all about it directly.' He then became cold, and almost pulseless. He could scarcely bear to be touched, and his mouth every now and then filled with froth. Kelley, Percy, William Blakey, and I did the best we could to keep up the circulation on his limbs, but all our efforts were unavailing. Dr. Johnson, of St. John, who had now arrived, made a careful examination of our patient, and ordered him a little brandy and water, and directed that hot bottles should be put to his feet.

Dr. MacLaren also shortly came to us, and, taking out his lancet, he opened a vein in each arm. But for a considerable time the blood would scarcely flow, and it became obvious that poor Renforth was sinking fast. After a brief consultation, the two doctors gave us all to understand that our countryman was dying. Kelly took Renforth's head between his hands and cried bitterly. Percy, Chambers, and Bright, the remaining members of our crew, along with William Blakey, John Adams, Robert Liddell, and myself stood around the bed, and witnessed, with ill-suppressed emotion, the vigorous life of our poor friend gradually ebb away.

At a quarter to nine o'clock, within two hours of the time when he had left the same house full of health and spirits, our dear comrade and England's greatest oarsman passed quietly to rest, without a struggle, and apparently without pain, in the arms of the most skilful competitor he ever had and one of his truest friends-Harry Kelley." An inquest was held over the body in Canada, when a verdict of "Died from natural causes" was returned.-The career of Renforth, though short, was an eventful one in the annals of boat rowing."

== Burial and legacy ==
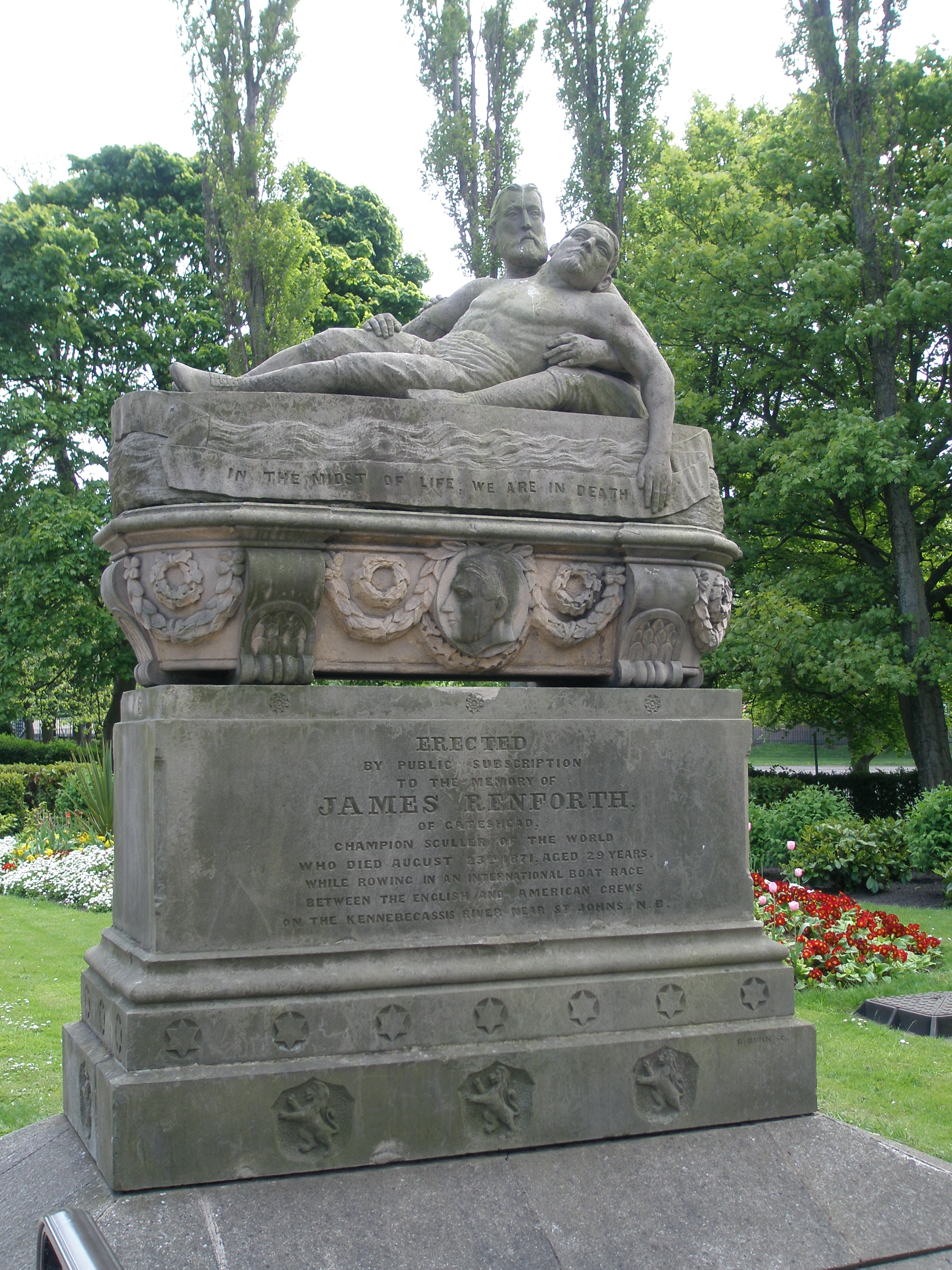
Renforth's memorial in Gateshead

His body was brought home to Tyneside and he was buried in St Edmund's Cemetery, Gateshead. It was claimed that 100,000 mourners attended his funeral. It is true to say that Tyneside was shocked by the death of a 29-year-old athlete in his prime, especially so soon after the deaths of Chambers in 1868 and Clasper in 1870. As with the other two oarsmen, a funeral monument was commissioned to stand over his grave. In 1992, it was restored and moved to a site outside the Shipley Art Gallery in Gateshead, where it remains.

Renforth's name was not forgotten in Canada. The community in which his last race took place in New Brunswick was named Renforth in his honour.

"In 1868 Renforth, one of the most powerful men that ever sat in a boat, easily defeated Kelley. With the subsequent history of this noted sculler everybody is familiar. His untimely death in America cast a gloom over the whole of the United Kingdom. I believe him to have been one of the fastest men that ever handled a pair. His loss to us at that most critical time was irreparable, for from his death may be dated the decline of English sculling"

Otago Witness, Issue 1951, 11 April 1889, Page 25

== See also ==
- List of people from Newcastle upon Tyne

== Bibliography ==
- Whitehead, Ian (2002). The Sporting Tyne. ISBN 0-901273-42-2.
- Whitehead, Ian (2004). James Renforth of Gateshead, Champion Sculler of the World. ISBN 1-85795-107-7.
