= North East Green Belt =

Area protected from development in North East England

North East England green belt showing extents, districts and counties '"`UNIQ--templatestyles-00000003-QINU`"'
North East green belt
'"`UNIQ--templatestyles-00000004-QINU`"'
County borders
'"`UNIQ--templatestyles-00000005-QINU`"'
District/unitary council borders

The North East Green Belt, also known as the Tyne & Wear Green Belt, is a non-statutory green belt environmental and planning policy that regulates the rural space in part of the North East region of England. It is centred on the county of Tyne and Wear, with areas of green belt extending into Northumberland and County Durham. It functions to protect surrounding towns and villages outside the Tyneside/Newcastle-upon-Tyne and Wearside/Sunderland conurbations from further convergence. This is managed by local planning authorities on guidance from central government.

== Geography ==
The green belt's area is 98,550 hectares (985.5 km^{2}; 380.5 sq mi) as of 2023, and is on the fringes of the Tyne & Wear conurbations, with a line of protected area separating South Tyneside from Sunderland. The main coverage of the area however, is within Northumberland, with tracts in northern County Durham, notably surrounding the city of Durham completely. A large increase to its present extent was made in 2022 when Northumberland added 26,790 hectares (267.9 km^{2}; 103.4 sq mi).

Much of the boundary is formed by local roads and land features such as rivers. The western extent reaches 25 miles away from Newcastle, beyond Hexham and towards Haydon Bridge, becoming contiguous with the North Pennines AONB and close to the Northumberland National Park. Due to the green belt lying across county borders, responsibility and co-ordination lies with several unitary councils as these are the local planning authorities.

== See also ==
- Green belt (United Kingdom)
