= Robert Chambers (oarsman) =

English oarsman and world sculling champion

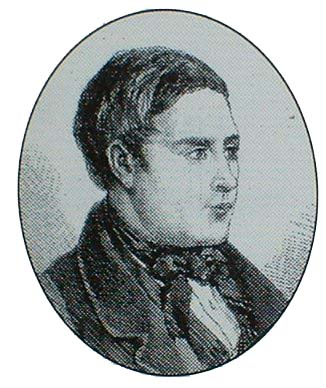
- Born: Robert Chambers; 1832; St. Anthony's, Walker, nr Newcastle upon Tyne, England
- Died: 1868-06-04; St. Anthony's, Walker, nr Newcastle upon Tyne, England
- Resting place: Walker Cemetery
- Title: World champion sculler
- Term: 1859–1865 & 1866–1868
- Predecessor: Harry Kelley
- Successor: Harry Kelley

Robert Chambers (14 June 1831 – 4 June 1868) was a Tyneside professional oarsman. He became the Tyne, Thames, English and World Sculling Champion.

He was one of three great Tyneside oarsmen, the other two being Harry Clasper and James Renforth.

== Early history ==
Robert Chambers was born at St Anthony's, a riverside area, east of Newcastle. His father worked as an iron moulder at the Losh, Wilson and Bell ironworks in nearby Walker and young Bob also began work there as an iron puddler, a job that involves stirring molten pig iron with a ladle to release the impurities. Although the work was hot and dirty, it developed his arm and chest muscles.

Chambers first appeared in a rowing contest at the age of 21, when he was beaten in a sculling race by a competitor named Hicks. However his performances improved until he was drawn against the veteran oarsman Harry Clasper in the second heat of the Tyne sculling championship, in 1855. Clasper, who at that time was 43, won the race, but he recognised that Chambers had great potential. He therefore invited him to join his Derwenthaugh crew. The new crew consisted of Harry Clasper (at stroke), his brother Robert, his eldest son John Hawks and Robert Chambers. The crew took part in the Durham Regatta of 1856 and won the main prize, the Patron's Plate. Chambers took part in the sculling competition and lost in the final to teammate John Hawkes Clasper.

== Early rowing career ==
Chambers continued to be coached by Clasper, who was a very astute rowing coach, and his rowing improved immensely. In the Thames Regatta of 1856, Clasper and Chambers formed a crew with two Thames watermen and won the fours race. The following year, in the sculling competition, Chambers won the championship, beating the best of the Thames scullers. The Thames watermen were sensitive about outsiders winning races on their river. They therefore looked for a local sculler who could restore local pride by beating the Tyneside man. Tom White of Bermondsey was chosen. A race between the two men took place on the Tyne on 19 April 1859 from the High Level Bridge to the Scotswood Suspension Bridge for a stake of £200 a-side.

Chambers won the race in amazing fashion. After 400 yards he collided with a moored boat and found himself 100 yards behind White, a seemingly impossible deficit to make up. However, he refused to give up and by the finish he had turned a 100 yards deficit into a 60 yards lead. His perseverance in this and other races earned him the nickname "Honest Bob", showing how people admired a competitor who gave a brave, whole-hearted performance.

== Championship of the Thames and World Champion ==
Chambers continued to win sculling races until he was considered an eligible challenger for the Championship of the Thames. The champion at that time was Harry Kelley and a race was arranged for 29 September 1859 from Putney to Mortlake. The stake was £200 a-side. The race was close for the first mile, but then Chambers began to pull away from Kelley and finally won by 200 yards. He was the first oarsman from the provinces to win this prestigious title and his backers rewarded him with a purse of 100 gold sovereigns. Chambers was now undisputed champion of the Tyne and Thames. Before 1876, the English Sculling Championship was considered to be the premier event in professional sculling. In 1876, the English Title gained the World status and earlier winners were retrospectively given the title of World Champion.

"Honest Bob's" success against the Thames scullers was recorded for posterity in verse by Geordie Ridley, the music hall poet:

O, ye Cockneys all,
Ye mun think't very funny,
For Bob he gans and licks ye all,
An collars all yer money

Another match was arranged with Tom White, this time on White's home water, the Thames. This took place in September 1860 for a stake of £200 a side. Chambers won an easy victory. In April 1863 Chambers sculled against another challenger from the Thames, named George Everson, and won by 100 yards.

In 1863 the Australian sculling champion, Richard A. W. Green, travelled to England for a match with Chambers, to be rowed on the Thames, from Putney to Mortlake i.e. the Championship Course. The race was the first overseas challenge for the English Championship Title and the stake was £400. Chambers won easily.

Chambers subsequently lost the Championship to Harry Kelley, the Thames sculler, in 1865, in a race held on the Thames. Kelley retired but Chambers then won the title back in an open race with Joseph Sadler in 1866. Chambers was defeated by Harry Kelley, (who had come out of retirement) in 1868, in a race held on the Tyne.

For further details of the seven World Title races that Chambers was involved in see World Sculling Championship.

== Ill health ==
By this time his health was in serious decline. In his youth he had worked in an iron foundry, in hot, dirty conditions that may have damaged his lungs. In any case, he had developed tuberculosis. At the time, he was the landlord of the King's Head pub, St Anthony's in Newcastle and, in an attempt to improve his health, he briefly moved to Croft Spa near Darlington. However this was to no avail and he moved back to St Anthony's, where he died on 4 June 1868, at the age of 37.

He was buried in Walker Churchyard and a magnificent memorial was erected over his grave, showing him in repose, with sculling oar lying alongside him. The memorial, somewhat vandalised, can be seen there today.

At his funeral, one of the mourners was a young sculler called James Renforth. He would soon take over where Robert Chambers had left off and become equally famous.

== Bibliography ==
- Whitehead, Ian. The Sporting Tyne, A History of Professional Rowing, Portcullis, 2002. ISBN 0-901273-42-2.
