= Charles Campbell (British rower) =

British rower

- Born: 1805; Lambeth, England
- Died: July 1851 (aged 45–46)
- Height: 5 ft 7 in (170 cm)
- Title: first World Champion sculler, professional
- Term: 1831–1846
- Successor: Robert Coombes

Charles Campbell (1805 – July 1851) of Westminster was the first recognised professional world champion single sculler. At the time (1831), he became the Champion of the Thames which was effectively the Champion of England although the Tyne scullers might have disagreed (see English Sculling Championship). After the English title gained the world status in 1876, earlier winners were retrospectively given the World Champion Title.

Campbell was born in 1805 at Lambeth. During his racing career, he was stated to be 5 ft 7 in tall, and weighed 11 st 7 lb. His races included pair and four oar events as well as single sculls.

== Title races ==
The first single sculls world title match took place on 9 September 1831 between Campbell and John Williams of Waterloo Bridge on the Thames course between Westminster and Hammersmith. Campbell was the winner, although no time for the race was recorded. Campbell was reported to weigh 11.5 stone.

The next time he raced for the title was when he was challenged by Robert Coombes. The stake was £50 a side and the match was run on 1 November 1838. The course was again on the Thames between Westminster to Putney – a distance of approximately 4.5 miles. Campbell was an easy winner and the time recorded was a slow 42 minutes, but the boats used were slow, old-fashioned wherries. Future races were to feature faster wager boats.

Campbell's third title race occurred on 19 August 1846 again after being challenged by Coombes. This time the stake was £100 a side. This was the first title race held on what became known as the Championship Course of Putney to Mortlake on the Thames. The match had been eagerly anticipated by many sportsmen and there was considerable speculation as to the outcome. It was noted that one of the famous Clasper brothers was a spectator. The boats that were used by the contestants were stated to be of the most approved modern construction and were within two pounds weight of each other; Campbell's being the heavier at forty pounds. A large number of spectators were on the banks and in boats to watch the proceedings. Although a fresh wind was blowing the water, it was tolerably smooth as both men made their way to the start. Just before the start, Campbell was seen to be sewing himself up in some sort of sack which came from the sides of the boat to around his waist. It was assumed that this was to keep water out of the boat, but its use seemed to cause problems. Both men were described as being in the finest possible condition; Campbell weighed 11 st 2 lb, and Coombes at 8 st 12 lb. The umpire was Edward Searle. At the start Coombes dashed off with the lead but Campbell appeared ill at ease and did not settle in good form and pulled slowly and unsteadily. Off Finch's Campbell caught a ‘crab’ and appeared much hampered by his bag arrangement which he unsuccessfully attempted to get rid of. Meanwhile, Coombes continued in his uninterrupted manner and by Hammersmith Bridge was about 250 yards ahead. He was not further troubled by his opponent, and he covered the distance of nearly 4.25 miles in 26m.15s to take the Title. The margin was two and a half minutes. Campbell was dissatisfied with the result and there was talk of a re-match, but this did not eventuate. See also World Sculling Championship.

== Other races ==
Campbell and J Phelps won a £20 a side race in May 1835. Campbell and Holmes won the St John's West prize wherry in August 1835. In a London verses Plymouth match he pulled stroke in a four oar race over 11.5 miles between Westminster and Kew. This race was on 26 July 1837 and the time was 1h.08m.30s with London the victors. He took the same position in a London verses Clyde four oar match with £100 a side on 30 October 1839. The course was four miles which London covered in 28m.15s beating the Clyde crew by 1m.28s.

== Death ==
Charles Campbell died in July 1851.
