= Longmoor Camp =

British Army training camp in Hampshire, England

- Longmoor
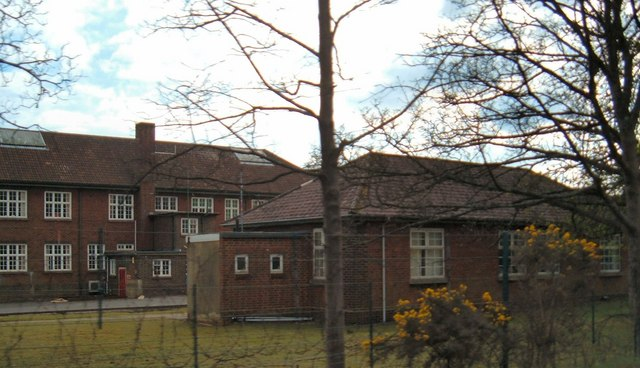
- Modern brick barracks at Longmoor

Site information
- Type: Barracks
- Owner: Ministry of Defence
- Operator: British Army

Location
- Location within Hampshire
- Coordinates: 51°4′23″N 0°52′8″W

Site history
- Built: 1863
- Built for: War Office
- In use: 1863–Present

Longmoor Camp is a British Army camp close to the A3 and A325 roads in and around the settlements of Longmoor, Liss and Liphook in Hampshire, England. The main street of the Longmoor part of the camp is built on an ancient Roman road, the Chichester to Silchester Way, while the village of Greatham lies to the west. The combined camp and training area covered 1,783 hectares (4,410 acres) of wooded areas, heath, wetlands and hard standings. Longmoor Camp and the training areas are still active, and maintained by the Defence Infrastructure Organisation.

The camp is occupied by the Royal Military Police Close Protection Unit.

== History ==
=== Early history ===
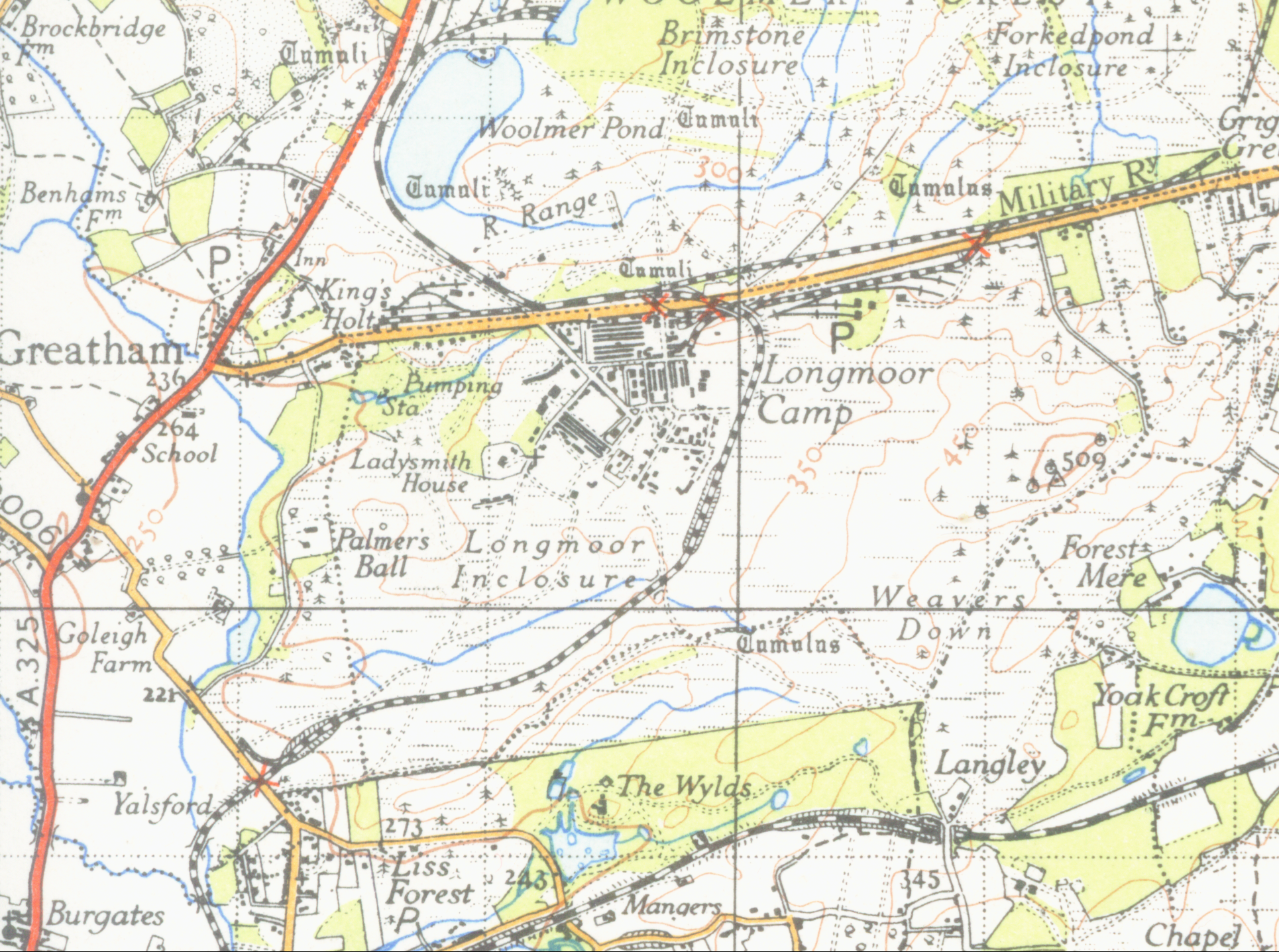
A map of Longmoor Camp from 1947

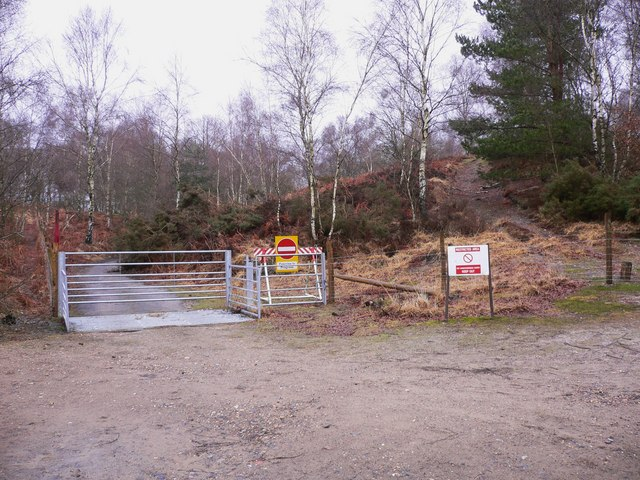
No entry to training grounds at Longmoor Camp

In 1863, the War Department had required additional training grounds for British Army troops. They purchased tracts of land totalling 781 acres (316 ha) from Her Majesty's Woods, Forests and Lands at Hogmoor Inclosure and Longmoor on the Surrey/Hampshire borders. However, the Army's main barracks were at Aldershot Garrison, requiring a 20 miles (32 km) march or expensive railway journey to access the new training grounds. This distance also necessitated an overnight stay, most often accomplished by pitching tents east of the A325 road.

The decision was hence made to build two permanent camps close to Woolmer Forest. The proposal was to construct 140 wooden huts on each site, each 72 feet (22 m) long and 21 feet (6.4 m) wide, giving a combined accommodation for 5,000 men. The first site was laid out in 1899 by the Highland Light Infantry, under the command of the Royal Engineers. This became Bordon Camp, an area of approximately 1 mile (1.6 km) long by .5 miles (0.80 km) wide. With construction curtailed on the first site by the Second Boer War, the Army began work at Longmoor Camp. After being laid out by the Royal Engineers in August 1900, construction materials were transported from Bentley railway station, with the resultant damage by commercial traction engines to the public roads bringing about the first trial of pneumatic tyred lorries to the British Army.

=== Early 20th century ===
In November 1902, the War Department bought the 550 acres (220 ha) Broxhead Warren estate from Sir David Miller Barbour for £20,000, added to by an additional purchase for £18,000 in early 1903. It was decided that the camps at Longmoor would be named after successful battles and locations from the Boer War. The officers' accommodations were named after Seven Years' War commanders, Amherst and Wolfe.

In May 1903, the 1st Battalion of the Argyll and Sutherland Highlanders and the 2nd Battalion of the Wiltshire Regiment were the first to occupy Longmoor camp. However it was built on boggy ground and the troops immediately began to complain of problems and the medical officers of ill health. A decision was immediately made by the War Department to move 68 of the Longmoor huts to the Bordon camp site, between 4 miles (6.4 km) and 6 miles (9.7 km) away.

=== Second World War ===
When the Canadian Army was looking for a European base, the British Army offered them Bordon and Longmoor Military Camps, which they took over entirely from September 1939 under a British officer commanding the local service and civilian personnel.

=== Post-war ===
Longmoor housed 5 Railway Training Regiment Royal Engineers which in 1948 became 16 Railway Training Regiment and remained at Longmoor until the railway role was taken over by the Royal Corps of Transport in 1965. Longmoor Military Railway finally closed on 31 October 1969.

Longmoor Camp remains an operational training camp including an urban training centre and extensive ranges. It also houses the close protection training units of the Royal Military Police.

In 2000, Longmoor Camp hosted a 10-day boot camp for the cast of Band of Brothers, HBO's award-winning miniseries about E (Easy) Company, 506th Parachute Infantry Regiment, 101st Airborne Division during the Second World War in Europe, ahead of filming. Captain Dale Dye, a Marine veteran who was awarded the Bronze Star Medal with Combat "V" for heroism during the Vietnam War and also plays Colonel Robert Sink in the miniseries, operated the boot camp as senior military advisor.

== Railways ==
=== Woolmer Light Railway ===
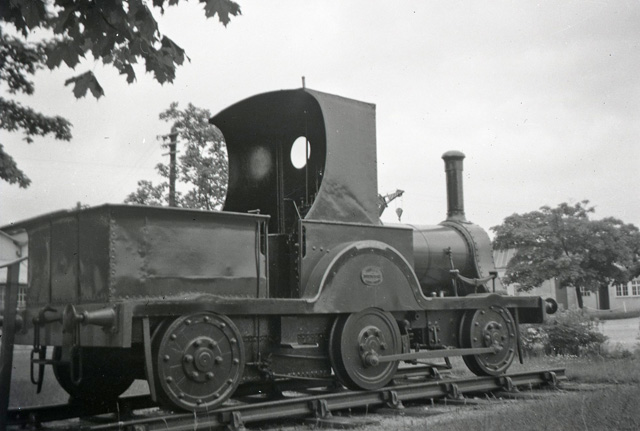
0-4-2 steam engine Gazelle at Longmoor Camp, 28 June 1964

Having reviewed the 1905 wooden hut moving project, the distances involved and the ground to be covered, the decision was made to build twin 18 in (457 mm) railway lines on which to transport the huts. The building and operation of the Woolmer Light Railway was given to the specialist 53rd Railway Company of the Royal Engineers, transferred from Chattenden Camp in Chatham, Kent.

While the laying of the tracks, placed 22 feet (6.7 m) apart, proved relatively easy, the movement of the huts did not. Weighing up to 40 tonnes (44 tons), each hut was jacked by hand 7 feet (2.1 m) into the air using hydraulic jacks, to allow placement of seven wheeled trolleys underneath it. Moved onto the railway and balanced across both tracks on railway trolleys, it was then proceeded by a platform on which was placed: a vertical boiler; a steam winch; a 200 imperial gallons (910 L; 240 US gal) water tank. Twin shire horses provided by the 13th and 59th Companies Army Service Corps would then drag a steel rope up to 500 yards (460 m) up the railway track. There it would be attached to a tree, something else solid, or if nothing else was available a land anchor. The steam-powered winch would then pull the hut forward, and the whole process repeated.

The route took the huts across the rear of ranges No.2 and No.3, straight through No.1 range, across Whitehill crossroads and on across Hogmoor enclosure, into Bordon camp. The average speed was 3 miles per hour (4.8 km/h), with additional steam traction engine assistance required up steep hills, and drag ropes and anchors on declines of over 1:6. The average rate of move was three huts a week, with a record set of one hut moved in a day, albeit having been placed on the railway trolley the previous night.

Once the huts were at Bordon, the 23rd Field Company Royal Engineers placed the huts. The movement of the huts was completed in May 1905. There were a number of notable accidents. In June 1903, a sapper was crushed to death underneath a hut, while the team attempted a hoist in the rain. A second hut slipped off of its railway trolleys at Whitehill, and was abandoned. It was later converted into the local police station.

=== Longmoor Military Railway ===
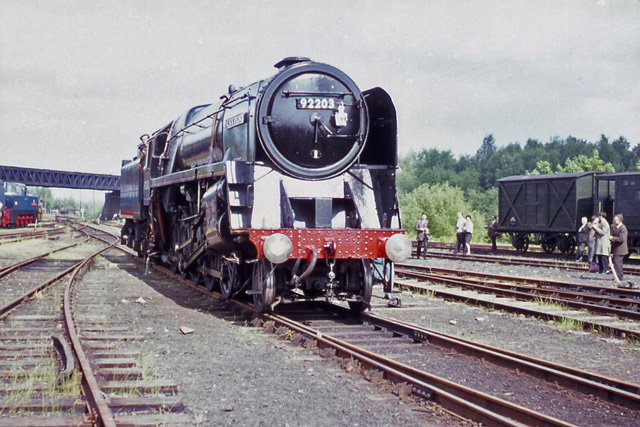
Artist David Shepherd's BR Standard Class 9F No.92203 Black Prince at Longmoor Military Railway, June 1968

The original Woolmer Light Railway was fully authorised by an Act of Parliament in 1902. In 1905, the London and South Western Railway had opened the Bentley and Bordon Light Railway, linking to a new station at Bordon.

The War Office decided to formalise the Woolmer Light Railway as a full-time instructional installation, having had to move the 8th and 10th Railway Companies of the Royal Engineers from Chatham, to support the 53rd Company at Longmoor for the hut moving task. Due to the steep grades of the Woolmer Light Railway, quickly surveyed but overcome by anchored steam power, the Royal Engineers surveyed an amended alignment for the proposed 4 ft 8 1/2 in (1,435 mm) standard gauge line, running closer to the Whitehill – Greatham road.

Workshops, stores and a locomotive shed were built at Longmoor, some of the materials used having been salvaged from the Suakin to Berber military railway, built during the 1880s Sudan Campaign. After works to convert and relay the line were completed in 1907, it became known from 1908 as the Woolmer Instructional Military Railway. After the Liss extension was opened in 1933, with a platform adjacent to those of the Southern Railway serving the Portsmouth Direct Line, it was renamed the Longmoor Military Railway in 1935. Woolmer remained one of the blockposts (signal boxes) on the LMR.

Although initially a single-track (later double track from Whitehill to Longmoor Downs station) end-to-end line running north–south from Bordon eventually to Liss, from 1942 an additional loop ran eastwards from Longmoor Downs station at the camp via a station at Hopkin's Bridge to a triangle junction at Whitehill. This provided circular running, allowing for improved training without the need to run round trains at the termini. The new line was called the Hollywater Loop. As a training railway for both the Army and later the Railway Inspectorate, it was often being constructed/deconstructed.

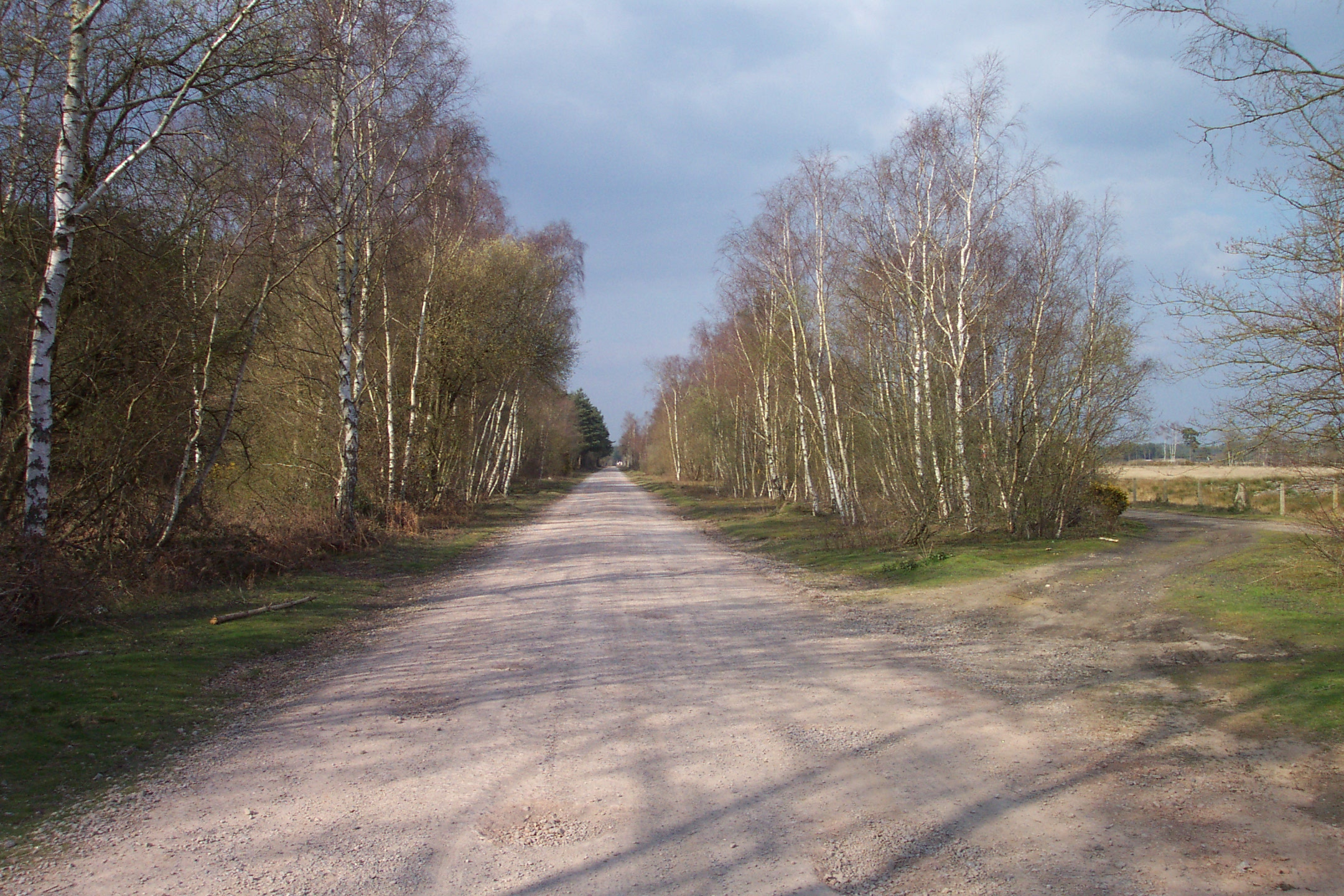
Former Longmoor Military Railway, looking north from Longmoor Military Camp

== Foxhounds ==
In addition to military use, the area is used by the Goschen foxhounds, Chiddingfold, Leconfield and Cowdray foxhounds, and the Hampshire hunt.

== Incidents ==
=== Death of Cadet Shore ===
Early on the morning of 29 July 1998, Cadet Shore, a 15 year old cadet from the ACF, was hit by a land rover during a fieldcraft exercise on a summer camp. She suffered broken ribs, a ruptured spleen, and a ruptured liver, and later died at the Royal Surrey County Hospital. No prosecutions or disciplinary actions were taken following the death. The cadet forces hold an annual competition with an award named in her memory, known as the Champion Cadet Trophy.
