= Longmoor, Hampshire =

Settlement in Hampshire, England

Coordinates: 51.073497°N 0.870217°W

Longmoor
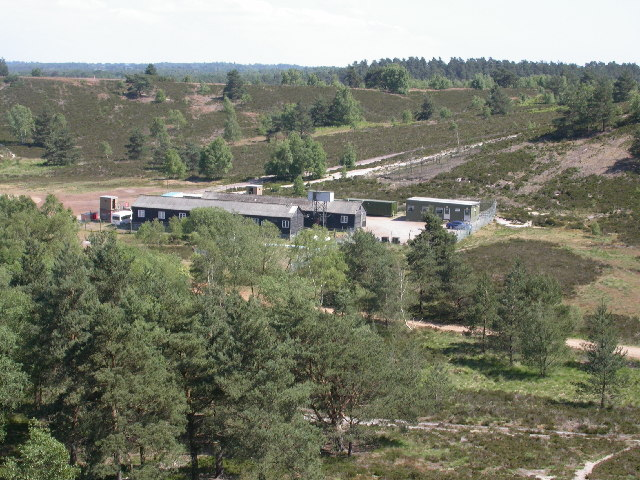
- An aerial view of Longmoor Camp

- Location within Hampshire
- Population: 100 (2008)
- OS grid reference: SU7924931070
- Civil parish: Liphook
- District: East Hampshire
- Shire county: Hampshire
- Region: South East
- Country: England
- Sovereign state: United Kingdom
- Post town: Liphook
- Postcode district: GU34
- Dialling code: 01420
- Police: Hampshire and Isle of Wight
- Fire: Hampshire and Isle of Wight
- Ambulance: South Central

Longmoor is a scattered settlement in Hampshire, England. The boundaries of Longmoor contain Longmoor Military Camp, a historic army camp and training area situated in the Longmoor Inclosure. It is now by the A3 road between Greatham and Liphook.

The camp of Longmoor had its own military railway from 1903 until its closure in 1969. The railway is notable for being used as a location for a number of films, including The Great St Trinian's Train Robbery (1966) and Chitty Chitty Bang Bang (1968).
