= Harry Kelley (rower) =

British rower

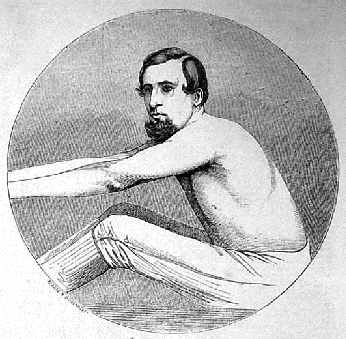
- Kelley in 1862
- Born: Harry Kelley; 1832; Fulham, London, England
- Died: 1914 (aged 81–82); Fulham, London, England
- Title: World champion sculler
- Term: 1857-1859; 1865-1866; 1868
- Predecessor: James Messenger, Robert Chambers (oarsman) (twice)
- Successor: Robert Chambers (oarsman) (twice), James Renforth
- Spouse(s): Barbra Whanslaw, Florence Elizabeth B Mcadoo
- Parent: John Kelley

Harry Kelley (1832–1914) was a professional oarsman on the Thames. He became the Tyne, Thames, English and World Sculling Champion, a title he won four times.

== Sculling career ==
The son of Jack Kelley, another Thames waterman, Kelley's first Championship win was in 1857, when he beat James Messenger for the Championship of England. Kelley's technical abilities in a boat soon got him noticed and he was regularly referred to as the best waterman the Thames ever produced, either as an oarsman or as a judge of rowing.

Messenger's reign was a short one. For There was working as foremosthand (pronounced "formstand") on one of the boats a young fellow whom old Johnny Coates, of Chelsea, denominated the future "star" of the Thames, Harry Kelley, one of the prettiest scullers ever seen in a boat. Messenger, never a very strong man, had to give place to this rising young waterman

We shall never forget the handsome figure of Harry as he sat in his boat. Many a time and oft have we stood at Newbold's window, at the corner of Holywell street, and looked at the outstretched arms of Kelley, and wondered when we should be able to grow a black beard like his.

Source:AQUATICS OLD AND NEW. Otago Witness, Issue 1951, 11 April 1889, Page 25

== World champion ==
Before 1876, the English Sculling Championship was considered to be the premier event in professional sculling. In 1876, the English Title gained the World status and earlier winners were retrospectively given the title of World Champion. Kelley first won the World Championship by beating the holder, James Messenger, on 12 May 1857. He lost it to Robert Chambers (oarsman) on the 20 Sept 1859. Chambers had several defences of the Title before Kelley challenged again. The race was on 8 August 1865 and Kelley won. James Hamill was the American Champion and he challenged Kelley to two races, only one of which was a Championship race. They were held in England in July 1866. Kelley won both of them and he shortly after announced his retirement. Chambers later retook the Title in an open race.

Kelley came out of retirement in 1867 and again challenged Chambers to a match. This race was on 6 May 1868 with the result that Kelley was again World Champion. He finally lost the Title to James Renforth in a race on 17 November 1868.

For details of the six World Title races that Kelley was involved in see World Sculling Championship.

== Renforth ==
Kelley was one of the celebrated English crew which visited America in 1871 with the then champion James Renforth. During a race against a St John's crew on 23 August 1871, Renforth collapsed and eventually died in Kelley's arms.

A memorial sculpture, erected by public subscription showing the dying figure of Renforth in the arms of Kelley now stands outside Shipley Art Gallery in Gateshead.

Kelley continued to row and on 5 November 1877 he raced Joseph Sadler over the Putney to Mortlake course for a stake of £400. After an even start Sadler went ahead and was never passed. His time was 24m.02s. After the race Kelley rowed over to Sadler and shook hands to the cheers of the onlookers. After finally retiring from competitive rowing, Kelley went on to act as a steer and trainer for a number of crews and scullers. He steered Australian Edward Trickett against Canadian Ned Hanlan during their race for the World Champion title on the Thames. He was still busy coaching F L Playford for the amateur championship in 1879 and steered the umpire for the Oxford Cambridge Boat Race on a number of occasions.

He died at his home in Fulham in 1914 aged 82.
