= Greatham, Hampshire =

Village and parish in Hampshire, England

Coordinates: 51.06955°N 0.89534°W

Greatham
- Location within Hampshire
- Population: 829 (2001 census); 795 (2011 Census)
- OS grid reference: SU774305
- Civil parish: Greatham
- District: East Hampshire
- Shire county: Hampshire
- Region: South East
- Country: England
- Sovereign state: United Kingdom
- Post town: LISS
- Postcode district: GU33
- Dialling code: 01420
- Police: Hampshire and Isle of Wight
- Fire: Hampshire and Isle of Wight
- Ambulance: South Central

Greatham (/ˈɡrɛtəm/ GRET-əm) is a village and civil parish in the East Hampshire district of Hampshire, England. It is 1.9 miles (3.1 km) north of Liss, just off the A3 road.

The nearest railway station is 1.9 miles (3.1 km) south of the village, at Liss.

== Description ==
Greatham is a small village, about 6 miles (9.7 km) north of Petersfield, Hampshire, 10 miles (16 km) south of Farnham, Surrey and 8 miles (13 km) east of Alton, Hampshire. The population of Greatham is approximately 800 people living in around 400 houses. The village is situated alongside the A3 which runs between London and Portsmouth.

Greatham is a linear village, mainly located along the old Petersfield Road (the main road between Farnham and Petersfield), with additional housing along Longmoor Road, Benhams Lane and Church Lane.

At the north end of the village is Longmoor Military Camp, where remains of the Longmoor Military Railway can be seen, and the new Woolmer Link road, re-routing the A325 from Farnham to join the A3 at Longmoor Camp, by-passing the village. Traffic calming within the village aims to discourage through traffic. Also at the north end of the village is Blackmoor stores, the combined village shop and Post Office.

In the middle of the village is The Greatham Inn, the village's only public house, opposite the relatively new "Todmore" housing estate.

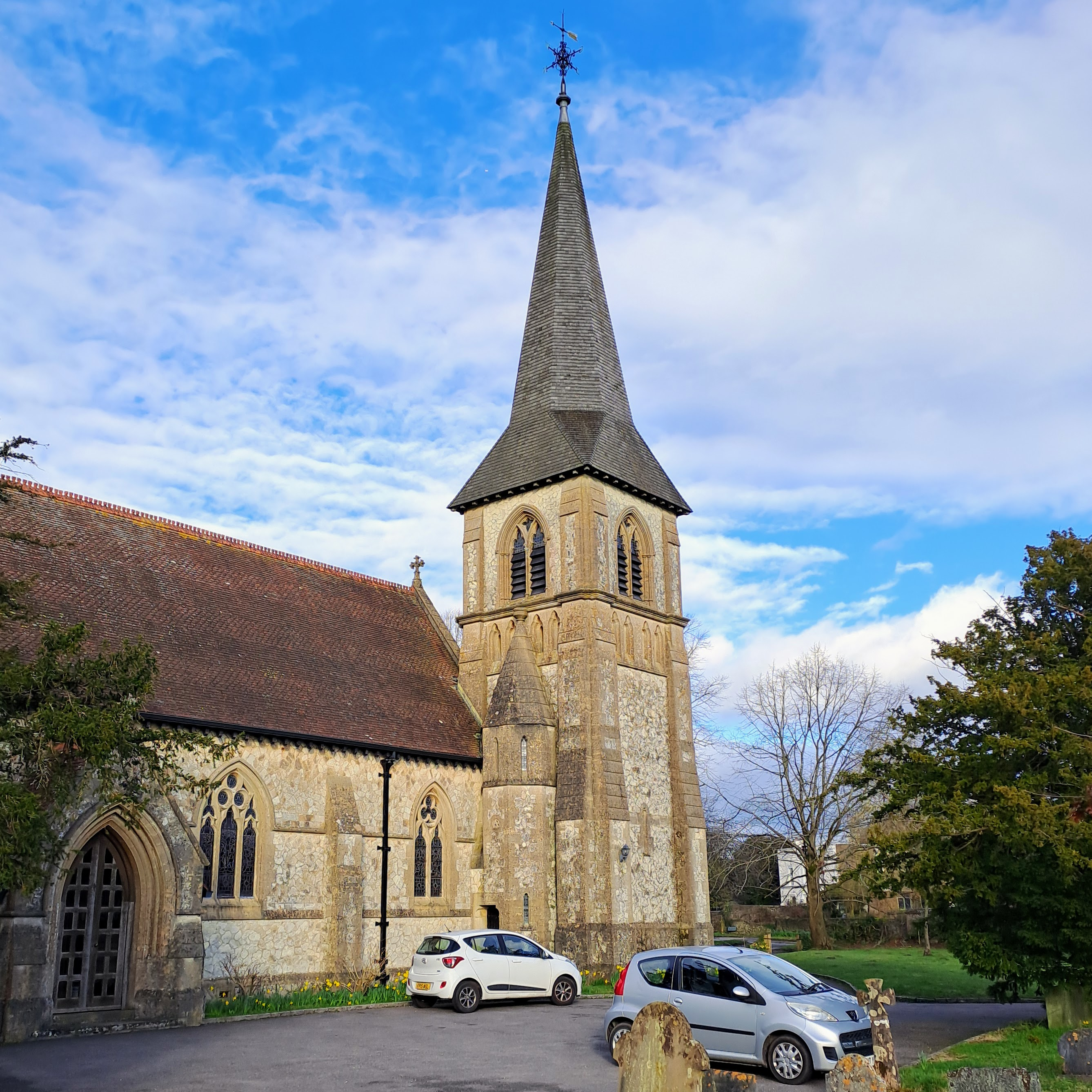
The Parish Church of St John the Baptist, Greatham, Hants

Further south is Greatham Primary School, which caters for around 200 pupils from the village and surrounding areas. It has a large modern extension, housing a new hall, offices and library. Opposite the village school is the Village Hall, with The Village Nursery School attached to it. The village hall is adjacent to the recreation area, which contains a football field, and two playgrounds, catering for young and old children. The village hall and adjacent playing field are the venues for many of the events organised by the Greatham Village Events Committee (GVEC), including the annual fun day, summer ball and the bonfire/fireworks party.

Towards the south end of the village is the Old Church, which dates back to the 13th century. The only remaining part of this church is the chancel, which includes a tomb of some historical value. The present church, the Church of St John the Baptist, was built in 1875, and lies opposite the Old Church.

Adjacent to the Old Church is a manor house, which is occupied by the L'Abri Fellowship, a Christian group.

The south of the village is bounded by the B3006 road from Liss to Selborne, known as the Selborne Road. Off the Selborne Road is Le Court, the first Leonard Cheshire home.

== History ==
The village is mentioned in the Domesday Book as Greteham, and later appears in written sources as Grietham in 1167 and as Grutam in 1236.

== Notable residents ==
- Peter Catt (1936–2025), horticulturalist and plant breeder
