= Whitehill =

Whitehill is a family surname

== People surnamed Whitehill ==
- Cat Whitehill (born 1982), American soccer player
- Clarence Eugene Whitehill (1871–1932), American opera singer
- David Whitehill, Australian TV presenter/producer and ocean conservationist:
- Robert Whitehill (born 1947), American poet
- Robert Whitehill (Pennsylvania politician) (1738–1813), US Representative from Pennsylvania
- Walter Muir Whitehill (1905–1978), American author, historian and medievalist
