= Harry Clasper =

English professional rower & boat builder (1812-1870)

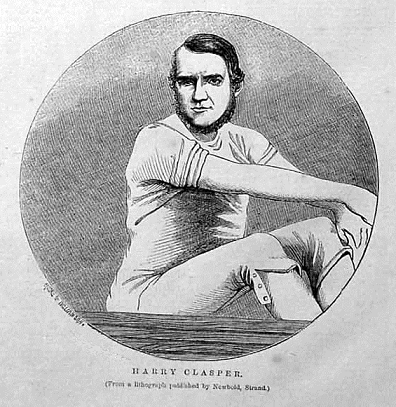
Clasper in 1862

Henry (Harry) Clasper (5 July 1812 – 12 July 1870) was a professional rower and boat builder from Tyneside in England. He was an innovative boat designer who pioneered the development of the racing shell and the use of outriggers. He is said to have invented spoon-shaped oars.

He was the first of three well-known Tyneside oarsmen, the other two being Robert Chambers and James Renforth.

== Early history ==
Harry Clasper was born in Dunston, now part of the Metropolitan Borough of Gateshead, but then an independent village on the south bank of the River Tyne, a mile upriver from Gateshead. Later his family moved to Jarrow, also on the south bank of the Tyne, downriver from Newcastle. At the age of 15, he began to work at Jarrow Pit, which was notorious for firedamp. After a while, Clasper decided that mining did not suit him and he became apprenticed as a ship's carpenter in Brown's Boatyard, Jarrow. There he learnt about woodworking and the principles of boatbuilding. This would be useful to him in later life.

After a while, his family moved back to Dunston and Clasper became employed as a coke burner and wherryman for the Garesfield Coke Company at nearby Derwenthaugh. His work as a wherryman would also serve him well in later life. Clasper then worked for a while at Hawks, Crawshay, and Sons Ironworks around the mid-1830s.

In 1836 he married his cousin Susannah Hawks, a member of a wealthy family. Their wedding certificate shows Clasper signing with a cross, as he could not read or write, whilst Susannah signed her name.

== Racing ==
Clasper formed a racing crew with his brother William and two other men. Harry rowed as stroke (the oarsman who sits nearest the stern, opposite the cox and who sets the stroke rate) and another brother, Robert, acted as cox. The boat was named "Swalwell". The crew started well, winning several races and became known as the Derwenthaugh crew.

Clasper took over the tenancy of the Skiff Inn, Derwenthaugh, and in addition to being a pub landlord, he began to build boats on the same site. He built two skiffs for himself, the Hawk in 1840 and the Young Hawk in 1841. With the latter he won the Durham Regatta Single Sculls race in 1842.

== Race against the Thames ==
The Derwenthaugh crew was dominating the rowing scene on the Tyne and the logical progression was to challenge a crew from the River Thames. This was done and the race was held on the Tyne on 16 July 1842. The race was rowed over a five-mile (8 km) course from the Tyne Bridge to Lemington for a stake of £150 a side. The Thames crew gained an easy victory. The Derwenthaugh crew's boat, St Agnes, although much narrower than the Thames boat (29 inches as against 40 inches), was 60% heavier than the Thames boat. Clasper realised that he needed to design and build a much lighter boat for future races.

== The Five Brothers ==
Clasper had already started to build a new four-oared boat, called The Five Brothers. The completed boat had a five-strake, mahogany hull that had been French polished. It also had outriggers, as had the previous boat, the St Agnes. Outriggers had been used before, but were not universally in use. Despite being much lighter than the St Agnes, the new boat was still about 20% heavier than the boats being raced on the Thames. The Five Brothers made an appearance at the Thames Regatta in 1844 when the Derwenthaugh crew won a prize of £50 and narrowly missed winning the £100 top prize, the Champion Fours.

== Lord Ravensworth ==
In 1845 Clasper took another four-oared boat, the Lord Ravensworth, to the Thames Regatta. This latest boat was a further improvement on The Five Brothers. The crew was all Claspers, consisting of Harry at stroke, brothers William and Robert with uncle Ned, and brother Richard as cox. The Derwenthaugh crew won the Champion Fours, beating two other crews, including one from London. They were given the title of four-oared "World Champions". The crew were given a hero's welcome on returning to Newcastle. Clasper then sold the Lord Ravensworth for £80.

== Later career ==
In the next fifteen years, Clasper, with a variety of other crewmembers, won the Champion Fours at the Thames Regatta six further times. His crewmembers included his eldest son, John Hawks Clasper and Robert Chambers, later to be World Sculling Champion. His last victory was in 1859, when he was 47 years old.

For many years he was a champion sculler on the Tyne and in Scotland, but was never successful as a sculler at the Thames Regatta. His last competitive race was a sculling race on the Tyne in 1867, when he was 55; his younger opponent beat him easily.

Clasper became a rowing coach using his experience of many races. He recommended rest, light and regular meals, walking and running, as well as two sessions on the water each day. He coached Robert Chambers, who became Tyne, Thames, England and World Sculling Champion.

During his time racing and coaching he continued to be a pub landlord, and ran a succession of pubs, including the Skiff pub in Gateshead and the Clasper Hotel on Scotswood Road, Newcastle. He moved on from there and finally settled at the Tunnel Inn, Ouseburn. He ran this until his death in 1870.

== Death ==
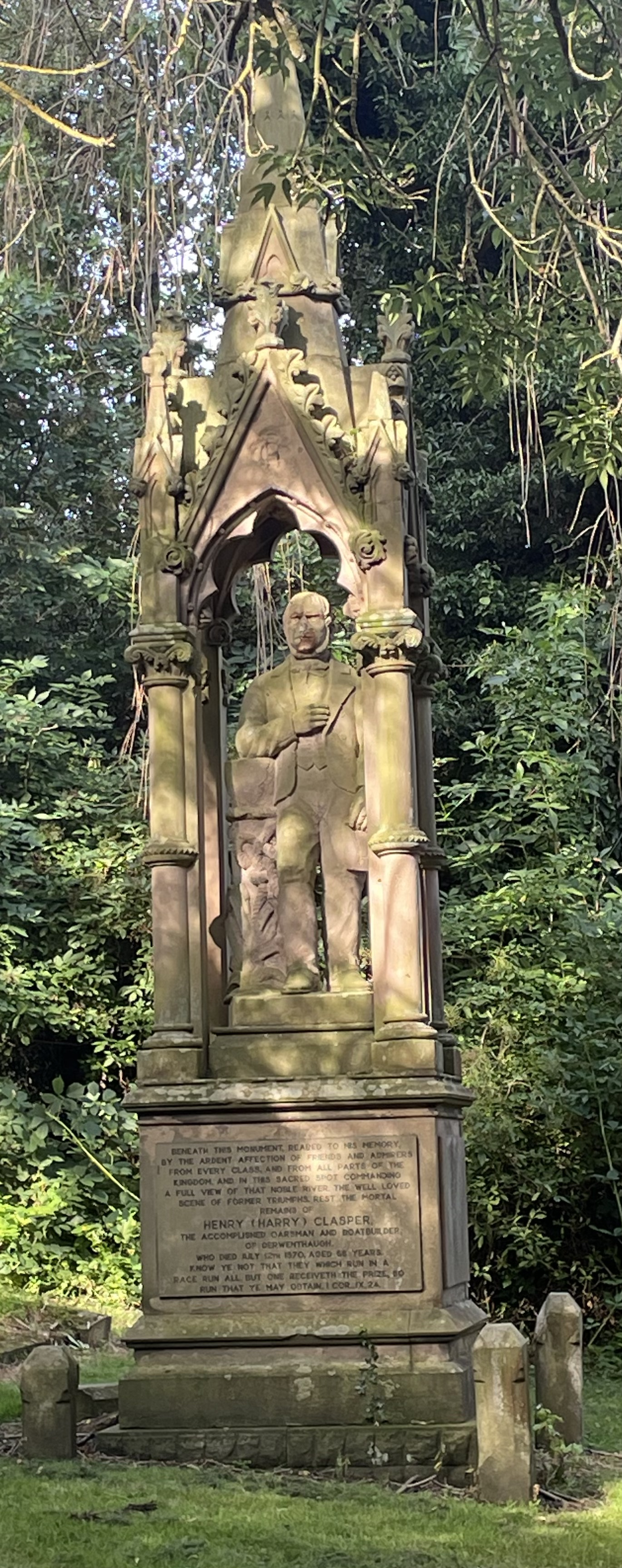
Harry Clasper Grave at St Mary’s Whickham, Gateshead

He died on 12 July 1870, probably of a stroke. For his funeral, the coffin was transported from the Tunnel Inn, Ouseburn to St Mary's Church, Whickham. Part of the journey was by paddle tug on the river, travelling over part of the course that had seen so many of his triumphs. Many thousands watched the funeral procession and burial.

== Effect on boat design ==
=== Outriggers ===
Clasper realised early in his rowing career that, to produce faster racing boats, it was necessary to reduce the area of the hull in contact with the water, so as to produce less drag. At the time, boats were wide in the beam because the oar was attached to the gunwales, and the oarsman needed sufficient leverage. Wide boats had a large surface area in contact with the water. A way of getting round this problem was to attach outriggers to the side of the boat and attach the oars to the outer ends of the outriggers. This meant that the boat could be made as narrow as possible, thus reducing surface area, without affecting the leverage exerted by the oarsmen.

Wooden outriggers had first been tried out on the Tyne in 1828, fitted to a sculling boat. Two years later, iron outriggers were fitted to a boat. It cannot be claimed that Clasper originated the idea of the outrigger, but he saw its potential in allowing the boat designer to produce a slimmer faster boat. In the early years, when the Derwenthaugh crew was racing against crews from the Thames, it was doing so in narrow-beamed boats with outriggers whereas the Thames crews were in wide beamed boats. The sight of Claspers boats winning races helped to establish the use of outriggers as a standard in rowing.

=== Shell hulls ===
At the time when Clasper was starting to design racing boats, the standard boat hull was constructed of a number of strakes (or planks), with a keel projecting from bottom of the hull. Together with Matthew Taylor, another Tyneside boat-builder, he worked to reduce the surface area and drag. They did this by placing the keel inside the hull of the boat and constructing the hull with a single strake on each side. The surface would then be given several coats of varnish to give as smooth a finish as possible.

It is difficult to say who was the first to initiate the idea of a single-strake hull. Robert Jewitt a boat-builder of Dunston on Tyne claimed that Clasper had copied the idea from him, a claim that Clasper denied. It was, perhaps, unfortunate for Jewit that Claspers fame meant that he received the credit.

=== Sliding seats ===
John C. Babcock, of the Nassau Rowing Club of New York, is credited with inventing the sliding seat, which allowed oarsmen to add the power of their legs to the stroke. There were several attempts to develop one without success until Babcock showed that it could be used successfully in 1870.

Prior to that, Clasper's crews, and other Tyneside oarsmen had developed a technique of sliding on their fixed seats so as to make some use of their legs in producing a longer more powerful stroke. This became known as the "traditional Tyne stroke".

== Bibliography ==
- Clasper, David, Harry Clasper, Hero of the North.
- Clasper, David, Rowing: A Way of Life – The Claspers of Tyneside, 2003.
- Dillon, Peter, The Tyne Oarsmen. Clasper Chambers & Renforth, 1993.
