= Ernest Barry =

Ernest Barry may refer to:

- Ernest Barry (rower) (1882–1968), British rower
- Ernest Barry (footballer) (born 1967), Maltese football goalkeeper
