= Major Goodsell =

American rower

Major L Goodsell
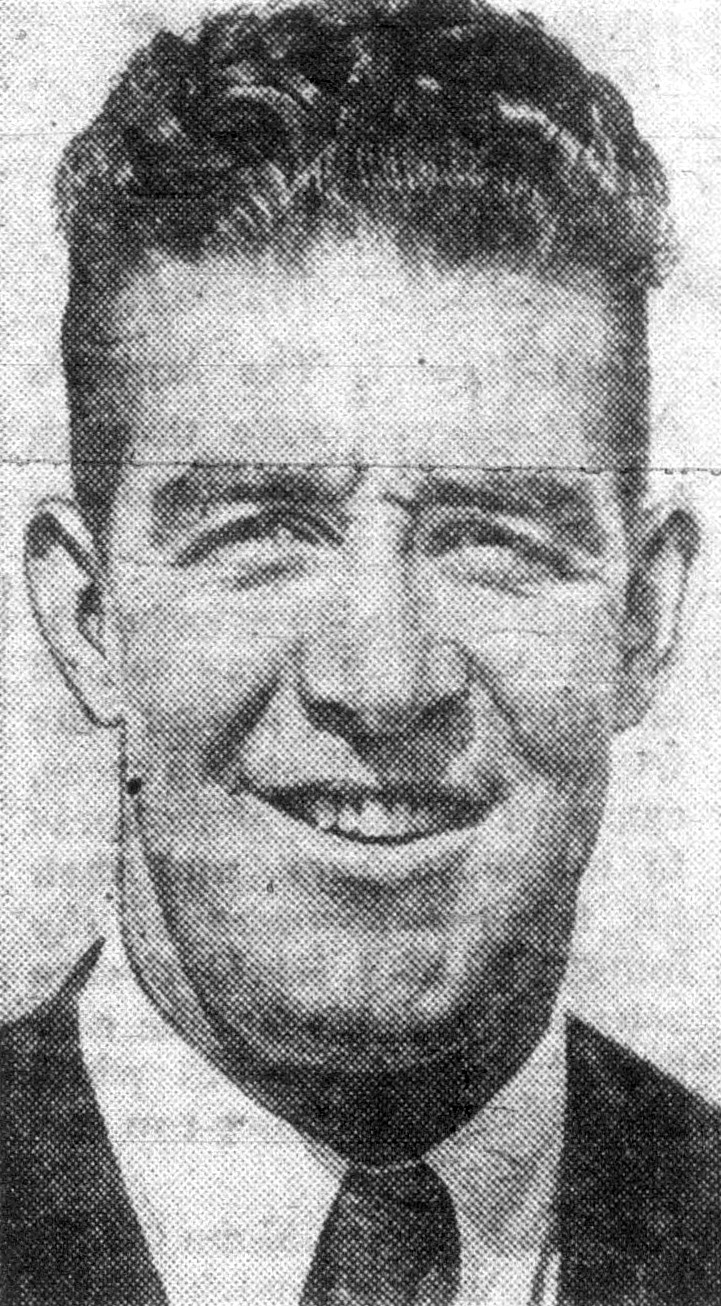
- Goodsell, circa 1949
- Born: 1 July 1900; Hunters Hill, New South Wales, Australia
- Died: 31 March 1988 (aged 87); San Diego, California, United States
- Title: World Champion sculler, Professional, Actor
- Term: 1925–1927
- Predecessor: Jim Paddon
- Successor: Bert Barry

Major L. Goodsell (1 July 1900 – 31 March 1988) was an Australian who five times won the professional World Sculling Championship. ("Major" was his given name, and not a military rank.)

He was born at Hunters Hill in New South Wales. His parents were Charles James Goodsell, born 1874 Sydney, and Ada née Lang. In 1917 he married Ruby Eliza Myers in Sydney and they had at least one son (Keith Major Goodsell, b. 1921 and Ronald Goodsell)

== First attempt ==
Goodsell's first attempt at winning the Single Sculls World Championship was on 20 September 1924. Goodsell was an up-an-coming sculler and had won the New South Wales amateur championship before turning professional. He challenged the World Title holder, Jim Paddon, for a match with a stake of £200 a side.

The race was held on the Richmond River, in the North Coast district, of New South Wales. Goodsell was known to be fast over the first mile or two and a good race was expected. He was trying to break the Champion by a fast pace but evidently tried too hard as he capsized after just a quarter of a mile. Although he got back into the boat and continued, the race was effectively over and the Champion just paddled home to win.

== Winning the championship ==
Jim Paddon was next challenged by another Australian, William (Bill) McDevitt, but Paddon had retired and declined to race, so McDevitt became the Holder by forfeiture. Goodsell challenged McDevitt and the race was run on the Clarance River near Ullmarra on 21 March 1925. The stake was £250 a side. Goodsell won easily by fifteen lengths although the time was a slow 22m.20s.

== First defence ==
Very shortly afterward, Goodsell was challenged by a New Zealand sculler named Pat Hannan. The race was run on 27 June 1925 on the Parramatta River, Sydney. Goodsell led all the way and easily beat the challenger. He was never fully extended and won by about three lengths. The time was 21m.31s. A crowd estimated at a quarter of a million was quoted to have seen the race.

== Second defence ==
Jim Paddon came out of retirement and challenged Goodsell for the Title. The match was agreed to be run on the Parramatta on 7 November 1925. Paddon at age thirty-nine was nearing the end of his career and failed to make any sort of "come-back" and the Champion won easily in a time of 22m.50s.

== Third defence ==
The next challenger was Tom Saul, also of Australia. The race was again on the Parramatta this time on 3 May 1926 and the stake was £500 a side. The day was fine but the wind made the water choppy. Bill Beach was the umpire. Goodsell won the toss and took the favoured southern side of the course which was about three and a quarter miles long. After the start Saul soon took the lead by a length. Passing Mortlake he tired and Goodsell went to the front and established a two length lead which by the finish was increased to seven lengths. The Champion had won easily in a time of 23m.11s.

== Fourth defence ==
The next match was unusual in that it took place in Canada. Normally races were held in the Champion's home country. The challenger was Englishman H.A. (Bert) Barry who was the nephew of Ernest Barry, a Sculling World Champion before World War I. Goodsell travelled to North America and the match was held on Burrand Inlet in Vancouver on 5 September 1927. Goodsell was in fine form and had no trouble in retaining his Title.

== Fifth defence ==
A return match between Barry and Goodsell was arranged to be run on 6 December 1927 and this race was also held on Burrand Inlet. This time the tables were turned and Barry crossed the finish line in front.

== A last attempt ==
Bert Barry was a champion for several years but had no challenges in that time. In May 1930 he lost his title in his first defence which was against Ted Phelps, another Englishman. Barry also lost the return match in October of that year. Both these races were on the Thames, London. In the meantime Major Goodsell had emigrated to the United States and remarried. He took out US citizenship, started a new family, and apparently never returned to Australia. Because of the economic depression of the 1930s Phelps was having trouble attracting challenges. Goodsell managed to source sufficient backing for a purse large enough to entice Phelps to cross the Atlantic for a race. The match was arranged to be run on 5 September 1932, at Long Beach, California. This was only the third time a World Title race had occurred in America. The course was the one used for the 1932 Olympic Games which had just concluded. Phelps retained his Championship this time but lost it a year later.

== Conclusion ==
Goodsell had raced in eight World Title races and won five of them. Only three other men (Ned Hanlan, Richard Arnst, and Evens Paddon) had as many (or more) races in the event, although Bill Beach had more wins for fewer races. After he finished racing Major owned three fishing boats in Ensenada, Baja California. Major also known for roles in movies like The Sweetheart of Sigma Chi in America in (1933).
