= Patrick Hannan =

Patrick Hannan is the name of:

- Paddy Hannan (1840–1925), Irish-born gold prospector in Australia
- Pat Hannan (1884–1957), New Zealand rower
- Patrick Hannan (presenter) (1941–2009), Welsh television and radio presenter
- Patrick Hannan (musician), British musician with The Sundays
