= New Zealand Sculling Championship =

The New Zealand Sculling Championship was the professional Single Sculls Championship of New Zealand held between 1881 and the 1930s. The Championship declined following the First World War and with the onset of the Great Depression in the 1930s.

== History ==
=== 1881-1891 ===
On 1 February 1881 Albert White of Mercury Bay offered to scull any person in New Zealand for the professional Championship of the country and for either £100 or £200. Apparently, this was the first time anybody had wanted to race for the title, even though the NZ Amateur Championship did not commence until 1888. PH Duncan of Christchurch was having some thoughts of taking him up. Additionally William Hearn of Wellington, New Zealand also wanted a chance but could not raise the £100 and so offered £50. He suggested that the three of them put up £50 each and have the races in Wellington as it was the most central, with the winner taking the lot.

Towards the end of the month it was reported that White and Duncan were to row at Taurauga for a £100 a side. White would allow £25 in expenses from the stake in the event of Duncan losing. The race was run early May 1881 with White the winner.

On 9 July 1881 the match between Hearn and White took place on Port Nicholson Harbour, Wellington. Hearn easily won the match and crossed the line eight lengths ahead. The time was 27m.29s and the course was stated to be about three and a half miles long.

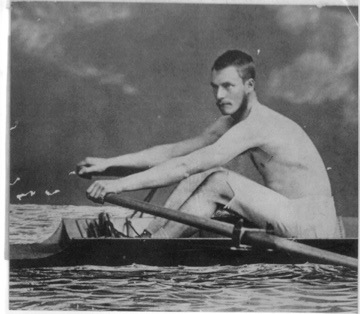
Charles Amos Messenger

On 26 March 1882 another race was held at Wellington for the Championship with Hearn rowing Charles A. Messenger from Victoria for a £100 a side. National titles were not necessarily held by citizens of the country concerned. Hearn was in the lead the whole time and won by about twenty lengths in a time of 24m.29s which was a New Zealand record.

On 1 January 1885 Hearn and Harrington raced for the Championship; this time at Riverton. A considerable amount of betting took place with the Champion being more favoured. The course was straight and again over the distance of three and a half miles. The stake was also again for a £100 a side. Harrington rowed close to the shore and struck an underwater snag, which punctured his boat and caused him to retire. Hearn continued in leisurely manner and won in a time of thirty minutes.

On 12 April 1887 the race was a bit different from most other championship races. Normally a 'match race' was run, a race between two men. This championship was held as part of the Riverton Regatta and there were five starters. Hearn won by two lengths in 23m.30s. The course was stated to be about three and a quarter miles long.

On 5 February 1890 Charles Stephenson of Auckland, who had recently defeated Joseph Kemp on the Parramatta River, challenged Hearn in September 1889 to a championship match. The race was run on Wellington Harbour for £100 a side. Stephenson won by three lengths in a time of 22m.22.75s. Hearn had been sick with boils the week before the race which may have affected the result. He was by this time nearly forty years old and retired after this match.

On 11 May 1891 Stephenson rowed Tom Sullivan, another New Zealander, on the Parramatta River for the title. Stephenson started well and got a good lead but then he somewhat collapsed. Sullivan took his chance and passed the opposition and stayed in front to the end easily winning by six lengths and in a time of 23m.33s. Sullivan later headed to the United States and England. He won the Championship of England but he does not seem to have ever defended his New Zealand title.

=== 1906-1930 ===
On 26 December 1906 William Webb beat Jim Stanbury of Australia, the ex-world champion, on the Whanganui River. In August 1907 Webb won the World Sculling Championship and as World Champion he declines any challenges for the New Zealand Title as he did not wish to risk a loss for a lesser title. George Whelch challenged but declined so assumed the title by forfeit. In December 1908 Webb lost World Title.

On 13 April 1909 Whelch races William Fogwell of Australia on the Akaroa Harbour. The stake this time was £200 a side. Whelch won by about twenty lengths in a time of approximately twenty and a half minutes. Whelch later challenged Richard Arnst for the World Title.

On 17 April 1911 Whelch and Fogwell had a re-match again at Akaroa. The challenger performed much better than in the previous encounter and Fogwell crossed the line two lengths to the good in a time of 20m.01s. National titles were not necessarily held by citizens of the country concerned.

In March 1914 a title match had been arranged between Fogwell and New Zealander Pat Hannan which was to be rowed in Sydney. For unknown reasons the match was declared off and that Fogwell said he would hand the Title over to Hannan who then claimed to be Champion. This was apparently disputed by Webb.

In April 1915 Hannan said that he was willing to row William Webb for the title and for £200 a side. The race was run in September on the Whanganui River with Webb the winner.

The First World War then put any title matches on hold. Webb retired as the undefeated New Zealand Champion. A match between Fogwell and Hannan was held on 20 November 1920 on the Wairau River, near Blenheim. Fogwell was stated to be the holder of the Championship but it was not clear how he obtained it. Hannan won but in a return match scheduled the following month he had to forfeit because of injury and Fogwell became the holder.

In October 1922 Pat Hannan beat Fred "Jumbo" Wells on the Wairau River for the NZ Championship. The next match appears to have been between Pat Hannan and James Mason and was held on the Whanganui River on 27 November 1926. Hannan won by four lengths.

In July 1930 Hannan retired but shortly before had handed over his NZ title to Mason. It is unclear if the title was ever competed for again. Professional rowing in general had declined after the war although it was still an important sport. The Depression further eroded any professional interest and eventually it was replaced by the amateur code.
