= Charles Messenger =

Charles Messenger may refer to:

- Charles A. Messenger (1853– 21 April 1905), British-Australian rower, champion sculler of Victoria, Australia, father of Dally Messenger
- Chas Messenger (Charles William Messenger, 1914–2008), British cyclist
- Charles Messenger (runner), winner of the 1968 distance medley relay at the NCAA Division I Indoor Track and Field Championships
