= Pat Hannan =

New Zealand rower

James Patrick Hannan (24 August 1884 – 1957) was the last of six New Zealand oarsman who attempted to win the World Sculling Championship title.

Hannan, known as Pat or Paddy, was born in Wellington in 1886 but was later a resident of Blenheim for a number of years. He had a successful amateur career and then went to Sydney, Australia, to take tutelage from George Towns and Harry Floyd before turning professional.

== New Zealand title ==
A title match for the single sculls championship of New Zealand was arranged between Australian William (Billy) Fogwell (holder) and Hannan which was to be rowed in Sydney in March 1914. Holders of national titles were not always citizens of the country concerned, and unusually this match was not to be held in the country named in the title. For unknown reasons the match was declared off and Fogwell said he would hand the title over to Hannan who then claimed to be champion. This was apparently disputed by New Zealander William Webb. Hannan declared that he was willing to row Webb for the Title and for £200 a side. The race was run on 24 September 1915 on the Whanganui River championship course with Webb the winner.

The First World War curtailed sports but in 1920 Hannan challenged Fogwell for the single sculls Championship of New Zealand. The race was held on the Wairau River, near Blenheim, on 20 November 1920. It is unclear how Fogwell came to be the holder of the Championship as it seems that Webb had not lost it by any race. He had retired undefeated. Hannan won but in a return match scheduled the following month he had to forfeit because of injury and Fogwell became the holder. In 1923 and 1924 reports of races for the Australasian Title, (see below) Hannan was stated to be the NZ Champion but how that had occurred was not said. Perhaps it meant the NZ resident Champion rather than the holder of a formal Title. Apparently, no further New Zealand Title matches were held and in July 1930 Hannan retired. See also New Zealand Sculling Championship.

== World title attempt ==
Richard Arnst, a New Zealander, was the holder of the Single Sculls World Title as he had won it by default from Ernest Barry. Arnst had earlier been the World Champion by winning races and wanted to defend this otherwise empty Title so he accepted a challenge from Hannan. For the fifth time a match for the Single Sculls World Championship was rowed on New Zealand waters; this time it was held on the Wairau River on 11 June 1921. The course was slightly shorter than normal, being three miles one hundred yards long. The stake was the usual £500 a side plus each contestant was to get half the net gate which was expected to be a substantial amount.

The race got underway despite a strong nor-west wind that was blowing. Hannan made a game effort to beat Arnst who was the stronger of the two and who won easily enough. Later it was reported that Hannan was a better sculler than the result might have indicated as had picked the wrong side of the course to his detriment, that his boat was too light for the conditions and it was incorrectly rigged. He had also wrenched his wrist shortly after the start so was hampered in his effort.

== Personal life ==
Born at Wellington 24 August 1884, the son of Edmond Hannan, educated at Marist Brothers school and Te Aro in Wellington. On 30 October 1919, Hannan married Alexis Mary Watson at the Catholic St Mary's Church in Dannevirke. The wedding was held in his bride's hometown; she had been a nurse at Blenheim Hospital. An all round sportsman, he excelled in swimming, rowing, sculling and rugby.

When asked by a reporter in 1926, of how he became interested in rowing, he explained how for a period of three years, he had trained under private tuition for the boxing ring. That was until his mother was acquainted with the fact, upon her very strong objection, and preference of Pat becoming a good sculler. Hannan died in 1957.

== Sculling ==
Resulting in 1904 at the age of 20 years of his joining the Wellington Rowing Club where he came quickly to the forefront as a sculler, winning five races under the club colours. In 1910 he joined the Petone Rowing Club, between that time and 1912 he was successful in 11 amateur events. While at Petone he captured the Gold Medal Handicap of one mile from scratch. In 1912, Pat paid a holiday visit to Australia he decided on a more serious approach to rowing after meeting such professionals as George Towns (rower) and Harry Floyd and took a course of tuition under them. Pat's first win was the Parramatta Hundred, in December 1913; this was rowed over a distance of two miles. There were forty contestants, the race being decided in heats. Included in the final contestants were George Towns and James Patrick Hannan. In that contest he rowed off the same mark as Towns (George Towns later became his trainer).

On Wednesday 21 January 1914, Hannan defeated Archie Priddle, the ex-amateur champion of Australia, over a course of three miles on Lake Albert, near Wagga . After his victory in Australia he returned to New Zealand. In January 1915, during a visit to Grovetown, near Picton Pat was so impressed with the fine stretch of row-able water the Wairau River had to offer, that he decided to train there for the Webb challenge. Later he set up home in Blenheim where he became a partner in Bests Garage (later Newmans) and while there, trained for many of his major races. In September 1915 he rowed against William Webb for the New Zealand Sculling Championship. The race was rowed on the Whanganui River; however after they had covered quarter of a mile, Paddy's leg went on him. The injury had been caused some years previous in a tramway accident in Sydney, resulting in the challenger being defeated.

In March 1920, Pat Hannan rowed against and beat Billy Fogwell at Wairau. In June 1921, he lost to Richard Arnst in a challenge for the world championship on the Wairau river. On 29 October, the following year Pat Hannan won the New Zealand Sculling Championship when he rowed against Fred (Jumbo) Wells, a renowned cyclist, winning easily by ten lengths.

In succeeding years Pat Hannan rowed against the world's best professional scullers, defeating among others, McDevitt, the Australian, to retain the Australian championship on the Waitemate Harbour in February 1924. A race which was declared a ‘no race’ and which raised a considerable storm in the rowing world, however Pat Hannan won the re-row a few weeks later.

In all, he won the New Zealand title six times and the Australian title four times. James Patrick Hannan retired from sculling after his victory over Jim Mason at Whangarei in 1929, at the age of 45 years.

Record over 14 years:

- 1913 – Won professional handicap, Parramatta River
- 1914 – Beat Arch. Priddle, ex-amateur champion of Australia
- 1915 – Lost to William Webb, New Zealand title, Wanganui River
- 1920 – Beat Fogwell, New Zealand championship, Wairau River
- 1921 – Lost to Arnst, world's title, Wairau River
- 1922 – Beat Jumbo Wells, New Zealand title, Wairau River
- 1922 – Beat Fogwell, New Zealand title, in record time
- 1923 – Beat Alf Felton, Australasian title
- 1924 – Beat McDevitt, Australasian title, Auckland Harbour
- 1924 – Beat Arnst, Australian title
- 1925 – Beat Hadfield, Tauranga
- 1925 – Lost to Major Goodsell, world title, Parramatta River
- 1926 – Beat J Mason, New Zealand title

== Australasian title ==
On 28 April 1923 a match was raced between Hannan and Alf Felton for the Australasian Championship. Felton was stated to be the Australian Champion and Hannan the New Zealand one. The race was held on Nelson Harbour and the purse was £500. Felton crossed the line first but was disqualified for cutting Hannan off. This race was notable in that it was the first New Zealand sports event broadcast on radio.

The following year a match was arranged between William (Bill) McDevitt, the Champion of New South Wales, and Hannan for the Australasian Championship. There was some debate as to whether this was a genuine title or simply an excuse for a money match. The purse was £500 which was subscribed by Auckland residents. The race was held on the Waitematā Harbour, Auckland on 2 February 1924. Hannan was declared the winner but the boats were so far apart width wise at the end of the course there was some discussion as to who actually crossed first. These sorts of courses were not laid out with buoys as in modern races.

Because of the dissention, a rematch on the same course of three and a quarter miles was raced on 28 February and it resulted in Hannan being the victor by a good margin. McDevitt said that the water was too rough for him on this occasion but his opposition had won squarely.

In 1924 Richard Arnst challenged Hannan for the Australasian Title. The race for the Australasian title was, unusually, held on the Waikato River on 26 October over a course of three and a quarter miles. Hannan got the lead at the start and maintained it throughout. Arnst broke part of his right scull on a piece of driftwood near the start but he later said that it had made no difference to the result of the race. Hannan won by over twenty lengths.

== Second world title attempt ==
Hadfield had become the World Title holder in 1922 but subsequently lost it that year to Jim Paddon of Australia. He in turn lost it in 1925 to Major Goodsell, also Australian, who held off one challenge from McDevitt before he accepted a challenge from Hannan. The race was held on 27 June 1925 on the Parramatta River, Sydney. Despite a good effort by Hannan, Goodsell crossed the line in front. This was the last World Title race involving a New Zealand oarsman. See also World Sculling Championship (Professional).
