= Tom Sullivan (rower) =

New Zealand rower

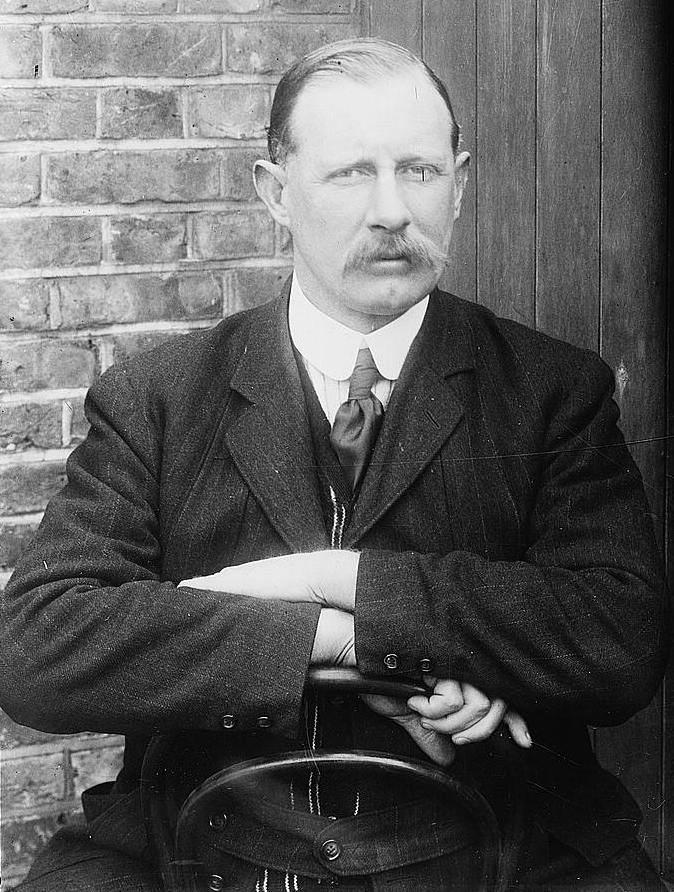
- Tom Sullivan, c.1910
- Born: Thomas Sullivan; 18 September 1868; Auckland, New Zealand
- Died: 1949 (aged 80–81); Vienna, Austria
- Other name: "Happy" Sullivan
- Title: Professional Sculling Champion of England. Professional Sculling Champion of New Zealand 1891
- Term: 1893–1895
- Predecessor: George Bubear
- Successor: Charles R. Harding

Thomas Sullivan (18 September 1868 – 1949) was a New Zealand amateur rowing and sculling champion who later turned professional and challenged for the World Sculling Championship title. He later became a rowing coach.

== Rowing ==
Sullivan was born in Auckland and won his first rowing race at age 13. He was a member of a widely known Wellington Rowing Club four-oared crew (W. Bridson, E. J. Rose, T. Sullivan, and T. McKay) that won all four championship titles under the auspices of the New Zealand Amateur Rowing Association during 1889–90. He also won the amateur sculling championship of the country in 1890 in Wanganui.

== New Zealand Champion ==
Later he became a professional. The normal build-up races of a professional were raced with various others in Sydney. On 11 May 1891 Sullivan raced Charles Stephenson for the usual professional stake of £100 a side; they also had a side-bet of £100. The race was a title challenge for the championship of New Zealand. Stephenson started strong and was well ahead at Uhr's Point. Sullivan gradually increased his speed and was four lengths ahead at the mile mark, eventually winning easily by six lengths in a time of 23 minutes 33 seconds. See also New Zealand Sculling Championship.

Sullivan then challenged Jim Stanbury for the World Title which he had won in 1891. Sullivan was the first of the six New Zealanders who attempted to gain the World Title. On 2 May 1892 the title race took place on the Parramatta River but on a shorter than normal course, and the stake was £400 a side. A large crowd was on hand to see the race. Stanbury took an early lead. After the halfway point, Stanbury steadily increased his lead and crossed the line three lengths ahead.

== English Champion ==
Sullivan later headed to the United States and England and in 1893 he challenged George Bubear of Chelsea for the English Sculling Championship. This race was held on the Championship Course on the Thames in London. Sullivan won and later he was challenged for the title by Charles R. Harding (aka "Wag" Harding) with that race taking place on the Tyne River in February 1895. Harding won and again beat Sullivan in a return match the following September. Harding also unsuccessfully challenged Stanbury for the World Title in 1896.

In the spring of 1901, Spencer Gollan, along with two professional oarsmen, George Towns and Sullivan, broke the record for rowing between Oxford and Putney along the River Thames. The distance was 104 miles and they managed to cover the distance in 13 hours 55 minutes, beating the previous record (set in 1889) by eight and a half hours. The trio had a strong stream and all the locks were in their favour, and they did not carry a coxswain.

Sullivan attempted to win the Championship of America in August 1905 when he raced Edward Durnan of Canada in a 3-mile (4.8 km) race in Toronto. Sullivan was soundly beaten and Durnan went on to unsuccessfully challenge for the World Title.

== Coaching ==
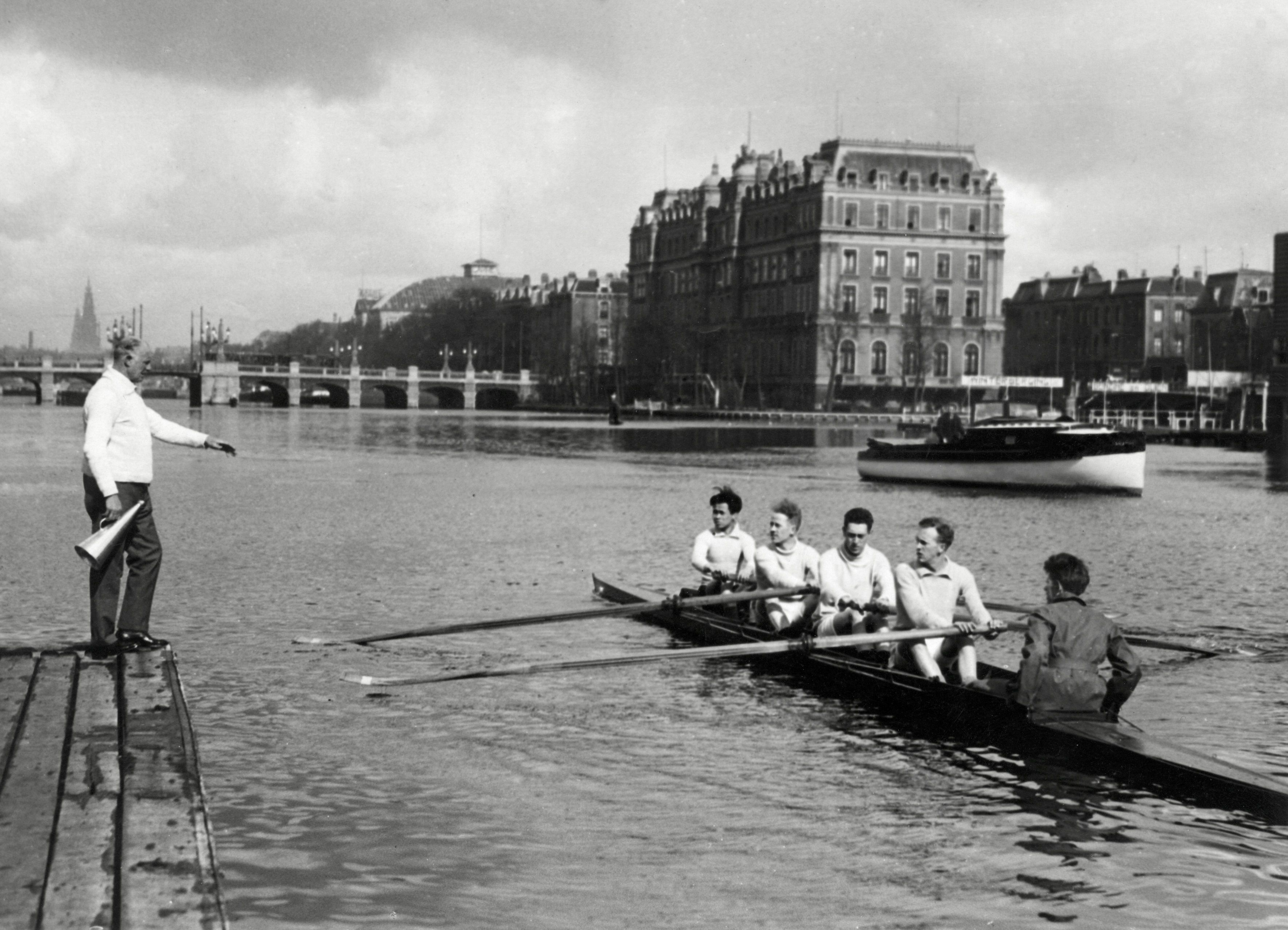
Sullivan coaching rowers in Amsterdam (1925)

Tom Sullivan turned to coaching and became successful. He coached crews at the Berlin Rowing Club from 1913. He was interned for four years at Ruhleben during the First World War and afterwards spent some time coaching in the Netherlands. He returned to Berlin where he coached the German coxed four to a gold medal at the 1932 Los Angeles Olympics.

When Coach Tom Sullivan left Berliner Ruder-Klub in October 1936 to move to Austria, Herbert Buhtz wrote a long celebratory article in the German rowing magazine Wassersport:

"Although a German rowing club engages an Englishman [sic!] as trainer, this is in no way a matter of national feeling. The main point is what the teacher is capable of imparting and not what mother tongue he happens to have. […] Tom Sullivan was entirely worthy of the great confidence we had in him. Of the 490 victories won by Berliner Ruderklub Tom was responsible for 224 during the eleven years he supervised the training of the club. He was known as a master of the hard English school, of strict discipline and exact method of rowing. [- – -] His work and mature art convinced everyone. He was an Englishman with an international outlook and an honest admiration for the Germans, a fascinating personality whom young and old under his jurisdiction respected and whom oarsmen from all parts of Germany were attracted. [- – -]" (From Hylton Cleaver: Sporting Rhapsody (1951), pp 48–49)

Tom Sullivan died in Vienna in 1949.
