= Jim Paddon =

Australian rower

James (Jim) Paddon
- Born: 19 November 1884; New South Wales, Australia
- Died: 5 May 1966 (aged 81); Evans Head, New South Wales Australia
- Title: World champion sculler
- Term: 1922–1924
- Predecessor: Darcy Hadfield
- Successor: Major Goodsell

James Paddon (19 November 1884 – 5 May 1966) was the second Australian, after World War I, to win the professional World Sculling Championship. Before the war, seven other Australians had held the title.

== Australian Champion ==
Harry Pearce, champion since 1909, had challenged Ernest Barry for the world title. Not long before Pearce’s departure for England, Alf Felton, Charles Towns, and Jim Paddon all challenged Pearce for his Australian Championship. The lateness of the challenges was intended to force Pearce to forfeit his domestic title so that the challengers could decide among themselves who should be the new champion. Rather than jeopardize his World Title chances Pearce forfeited his title which was then claimed by Felton. Felton and Towns raced in January 1913 and Felton won the race by four lengths. In a subsequent race held in February 1913 Paddon handsomely beat Felton by two minutes and thus became the Australian Champion; a title he held until 1926. See Also Australian Sculling Championship.

== World Title Attempt ==
On the strength of his win Paddon challenged Ernest Barry for the World Title. Barry was interested in travelling to Australia for a match but stated that the British public would expect any title match involving an English champion to be raced on home waters. Paddon therefore went to England and the match was held on the Thames on the Championship Course on 7 September 1914. Paddon was nicknamed "Big Jim" as he was unusually tall for the times being 6 feet 4 inches tall. At the start Barry was faster away and soon had a three-quarters length lead but Paddon, by spurting, had a small lead at the mile post. At this point the time was 4 m.59s. Barry with a better stroke overhauled Paddon and by Hammersmith Bridge was more than a length in front. However Barry ‘caught a crab’ under the bridge and Paddon took advantage of this and again spurted. There was a risk of a foul and later Paddon stated that the boats did actually touch but as he did not want to win in that manner he did not make any appeal to the umpire. Barry did not believe the boats touched. Barry quickly recovered and extended his lead to nearly three lengths at Chiswick Church, by four lengths at Barnes Bridge, eased off and finally came home by two and a half lengths in a time of 21 m.28s. Paddon said that he was satisfied with his rowing but that the water had bothered him. No World Title matches were held during World War I. In 1919 Barry raced and lost to Alf Felton on the Thames. In a return match in Sydney in 1920 the result was reversed. Barry was then challenged by Richard Arnst but he failed to accept as he had retired so Arnst became the holder by forfeiture, and after one defense against Pat Hannan lost the title to fellow New Zealander Darcy Hadfield in 1922.

== World Champion ==
Paddon still felt he was up to taking the World Title so he challenged Hadfield. This time the race was to be held on the Whanganui River, New Zealand, at Easter time (18 April 1922.) A large crowd turned up to watch the race including leading parliamentarians. After the start, Hadfield forged ahead but this spurred Paddon to greater efforts. Shortly afterwards Hadfield showed signs of arm weakness so that by the mile post Paddon was three lengths clear. From there on, no matter what Hadfield tried, the result was never in doubt as Paddon’s superior strength and position on the river won the day. By the three mile post he was six lengths clear and gained another by the finish shortly afterwards. Paddon thus became World Champion. The time was a fast 19 m.19s.

== The Return Match ==
Paddon and Hadfield had a return match on 21 July 1923. The stake was £500 a side. Unusually this match was held on the Richmond River, North Coast district, NSW, Australia. Usually such races were held on the Parramatta River in Sydney but Paddon was disinclined to race there. Hadfield had done much more training than for the previous race and observers believed a much closer race would be expected. Unfortunately, this was not to be the case and Paddon easily won by a dozen lengths or so in a time of 19 m.46s.

== The Felton Challenge ==
Alf Felton had his third World Title match when he challenged Jim Paddon. Felton had persuaded a group of Brisbane promoters to stage a world championship match as part of the Brisbane Centennial celebrations. The match was unusual in that it was held on the Brisbane River – the first such match on the river. The date was 12 August 1924 and the course was slightly shorter than normal at about three miles. Felton further caused controversy when he refused to row with Bill Beach as umpire. Paddon as Champion had the right to nominate most of the terms, but in order to secure the match agreed to Felton’s demands and another umpire was found. A very large crowd was on hand to witness the race but it was not much of a race. Felton had the reputation of a fast sprinter but he showed none of his old form when Paddon took the lead after only one hundred yards and the result was never in doubt. Paddon easily defeated Felton in a time of 17 m.55s.

== The Goodsell Challenge ==
Major Goodsell had his first attempt at winning the Single Sculls World Championship on 20 September 1924. Goodsell was an up-an-coming sculler and had won the New South Wales amateur championship before turning professional. He challenged Paddon, for a match with a stake of £200 a side. The race was held on the Richmond River, North Coast district, NSW, Australia. Goodsell was known to be fast over the first mile or two and a good race was expected. He was trying to break the Champion by a fast pace but evidently tried too hard as he capsized after just a quarter of a mile. Although he got back into the boat and continued, the race was effectively over and the Champion just paddled home to win.

== Retirement ==
Jim Paddon was next challenged by another Australian, William (Bill) McDevitt, but Paddon had decided to retire and declined to race, so McDevitt became the Holder by forfeiture. Paddon stated that in declining to race it was on the condition that Goodsell would get the right of first challenge. Goodsell therefore challenged McDevitt and the race was run on the Clarance River near Ullmarra on 21 March 1925. The stake was £250 a side. Goodsell won easily by fifteen lengths although the time was a slow 22 m.20s. McDevitt was one of two Title Holders who had gained the honour by forfeiture and who failed to defend it on their first challenge. The other was Charles Towns.

== Final Championship Race ==
Goodsell held off a challenge by Pat Hannan in 1925. Paddon decided to come out of retirement and challenged Goodsell and this race was held on 7 November 1925 on the famous Parramatta course in Sydney. By this time Paddon was aged nearly thirty-nine years and was nearing the end of his career. He failed to make any sort of "come-back" and the Champion won easily in a time of 22 m.50s.

== Overview ==
Paddon was the Australian Champion for about thirteen years 1913–26; an unusually long time. Paddon also raced in six World Championship races and very easily won four of them. His active years in this event spanned from 1914 to 1925 which was a far longer time than many other champions. Jim Paddon was the father of Evans Paddon who was a much later Single Sculls World Champion. Evans was involved in nine such races and won three of them in the period 1938–57. See also World Sculling Championship.
