= Charles A. Messenger =

Australian rower (1853–1905)

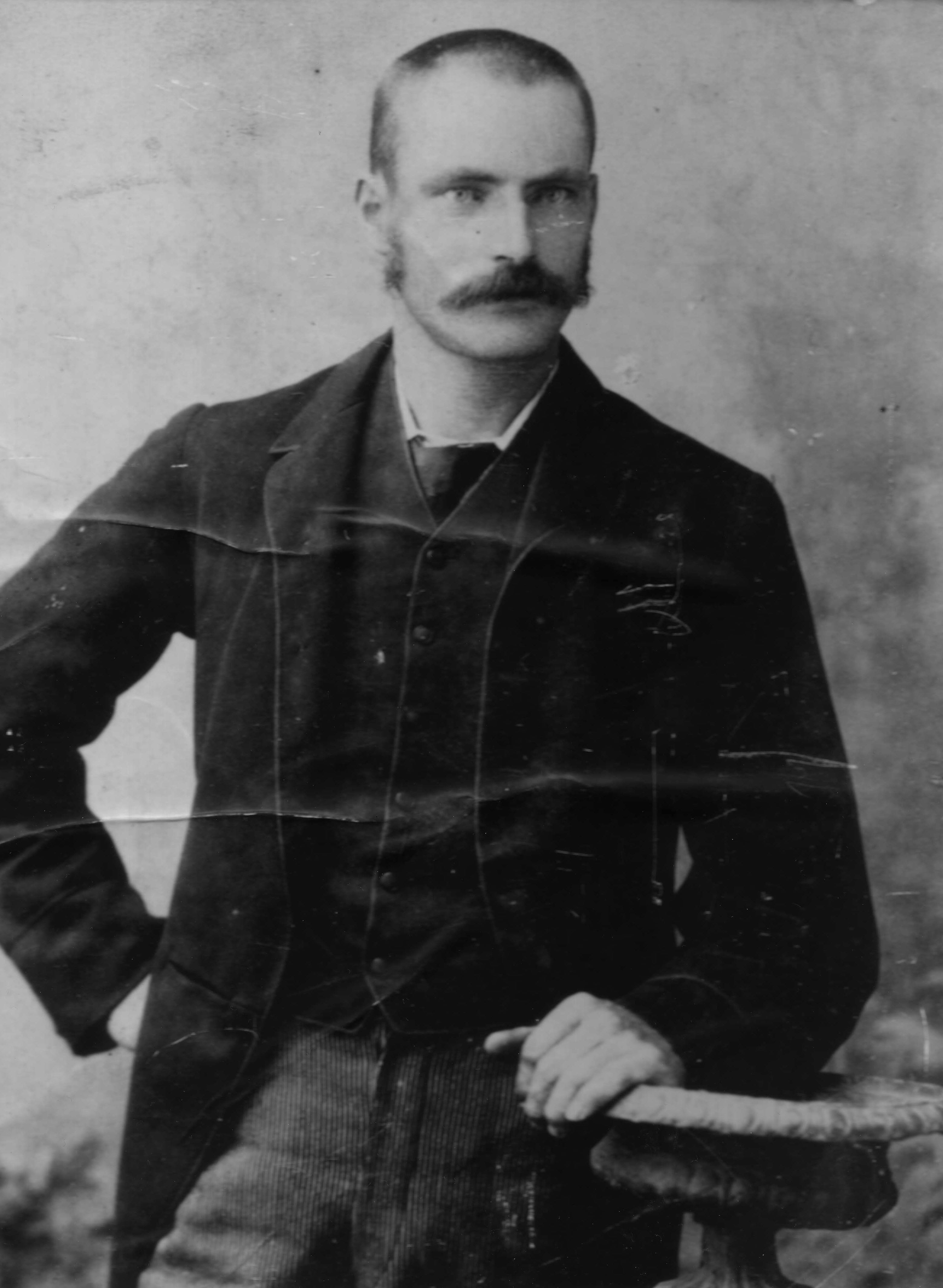

Personal information
- Citizenship: Australian
- Born: 1853 Teddington, England
- Died: 21 April 1905 (aged 51) Double Bay, Sydney, Australia
- Resting place: Waverley Cemetery
- Monument: Tombstone (see photo)
- Occupation(s): Professional Sculler, rower and boatbuilder
- Years active: 34
- Weight: 70 kg (154 lb)
- Spouse: Annie Frances nee Atkinson

Sport
- Country: Australia
- Sport: Rowing / sculling

Achievements and titles
- Regional finals: Champion sculler of Victoria

Charles Amos Messenger (1853 – 21 April 1905) was an Australian sculler and rower.

He was born in London where his family was well known in aquatic circles. He married Annie Frances Atkinson on 30 November 1875 in Gore Street, Fitzroy, Victoria, and died in Sydney, Australia.

The couple had eight children including the original Australian superstar of Rugby League and Rugby Union, Dally Messenger. and the younger Wally Messenger, who also represented Australia in Rugby League.

== Antecedent ==
His father James Messenger was a noted sculler and boat builder who in 1854 won the World Sculling Championship from Tom Cole. James held the title for four years until beaten by the well known sculler Harry Kelley. James was also Queen's waterman and bargemaster to Queen Victoria on the River Thames.

In 1862, his uncle John Messenger won the sculling race down the Thames, the renowned and historical Doggett's Coat and Badge, the oldest rowing race in the world and which is mentioned in the famous diary of Samuel Pepys. For centuries it was considered the sculling championship of the world.

== Personal and sculling achievements ==
In England, when a member of the Alliance Rowing Club, he won the junior sculls at the Thames National Regatta in 1872 (the prize being presented by Mr. Biffen, the boatbuilder, of Hammersmith). He also rowed for the Apprentices' Badge, the gift of the London Rowing Club, in 1873 and 1874. He was one of a four (two Messengers, Hamilton, and Joe Sadler), who rowed for the Champion Fours at the Thames Regatta of 1873. Charles Messenger migrated to Australia ca.1874 in search of sculling fame and fortune. He gained a job in his trade as a boatbuilder at Greenlands Boatbuilders in Melbourne, where boatsheds still exist to this day, east of Princes Bridge.

At the time of his marriage (1875), he was living at Emerald Hill on the land on which is now the South Melbourne Town Hall.

=== Sculling Championship of Victoria ===
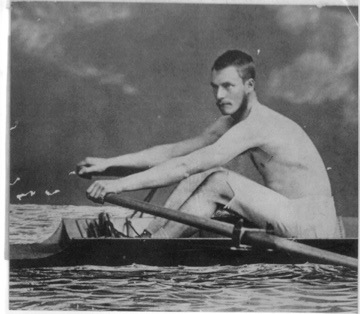
Messenger – Champion Sculler of Victoria, Australia and runner-up for the unofficial "Championship of the World"

His main competitors in Melbourne were John Christie and John Cazaly, father of the later famous Australian Rules footballer, Roy Cazaly. On 6 July 1878, it was John Christie whom Messenger defeated for the sculling championship of Victoria. Reports describe Messenger as having:-

... a different style ... of sculling; it is simply marvellous the way in which he uses the slide; his catch is very even; he gets all his weight behind the rowlock and his body, arms, and sculls move like machinery itself... both struck the water together, and that is the only time they were together. Messenger dashed off at forty strokes, while Christie doing his best at thirty-six to thirty-eight. Before one quarter of the distance was traversed Messenger established a long lead and dropped down to thirty-six. The reader will be able to judge how easily ‘Messenger had his opponent, for he was able to recognise people on the banks, while poor Christie was struggling for life and death for the position which was so easily held by the undeniable ‘Messenger, About a quarter of a mile from the winning post Christie came up to Messenger, but only on sufferance, although some people gave vent to their feelings, and eventually Messenger (to use horsey phrase), won hands down in a common canter.

=== Sculling "Championship of the World" ===
Even though, courtesy of the Gold Rush, Melbourne was the second largest city in the British Empire, word came to Charles that there was a rowing and sculling "fever" in NSW whereby races along the Parramatta River were enjoying over 100,000 spectators and the prize monies were much more generous than in Melbourne.

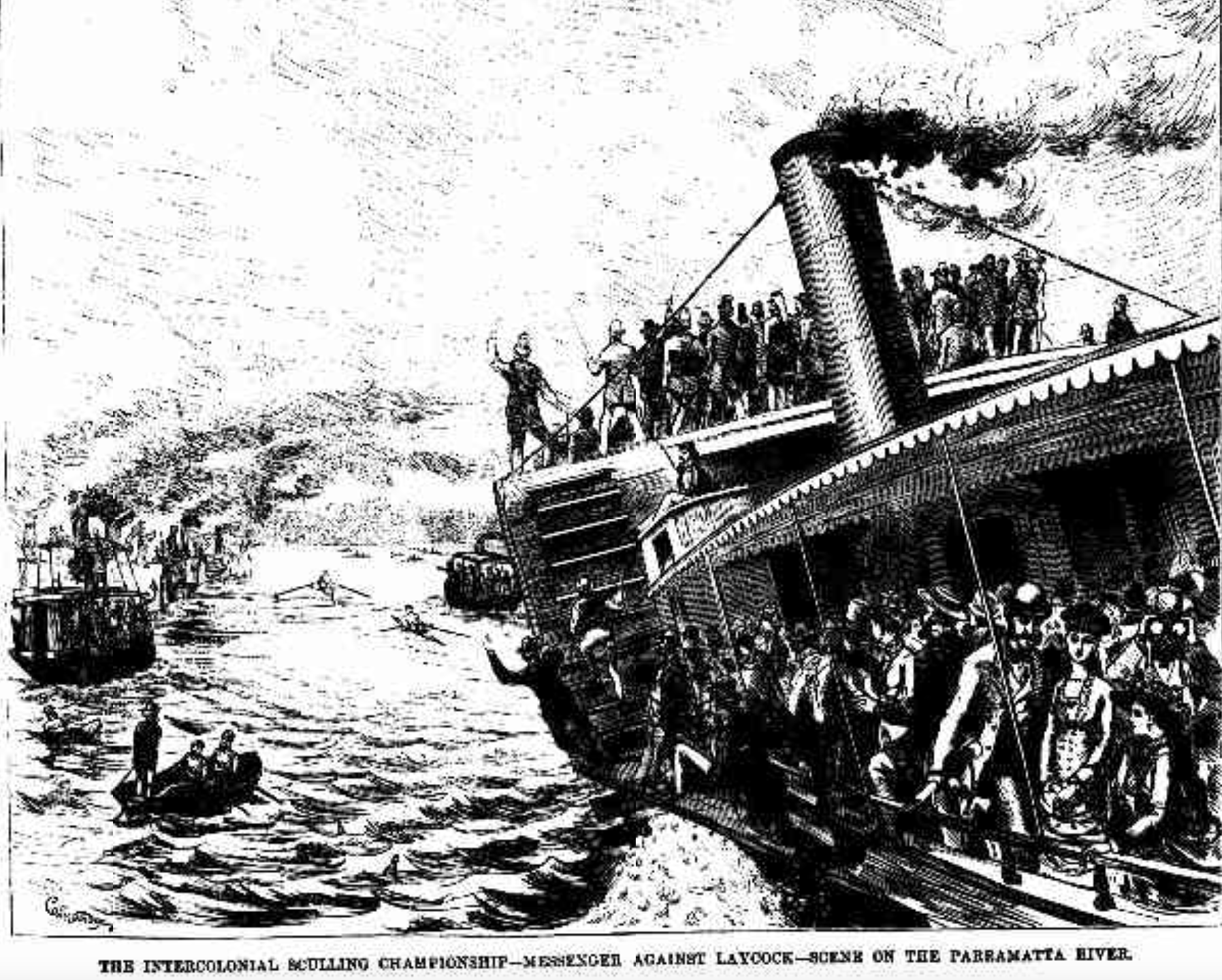
Charles Messenger hindered by paddle steamer

He grew his reputation. In a famous race against Elias Laycock on 14 September 1878, billed as the "Championship of the World", Messenger was dubbed the "Melbourne man" and his competitor the "Sydney man". When Messenger was clearly winning the race, supporters of Laycock, who were following the race in a ferry, crossed in front of Messenger and swamped him, thus ensuring the win for Laycock.

Messenger caught the water first, and shortly after starting had placed half a length between him and his opponent. ... Laycock reversed the position ... A quarter of a mile from Blaxland's Point Messenger forged his way to the front, and led past the point three-quarters of a length to the good. ... The steamers came up on the east side of him, and, giving him their wash, completely upset any hopes of his being able to make up his lost ground.

=== Later Performances in Sydney ===
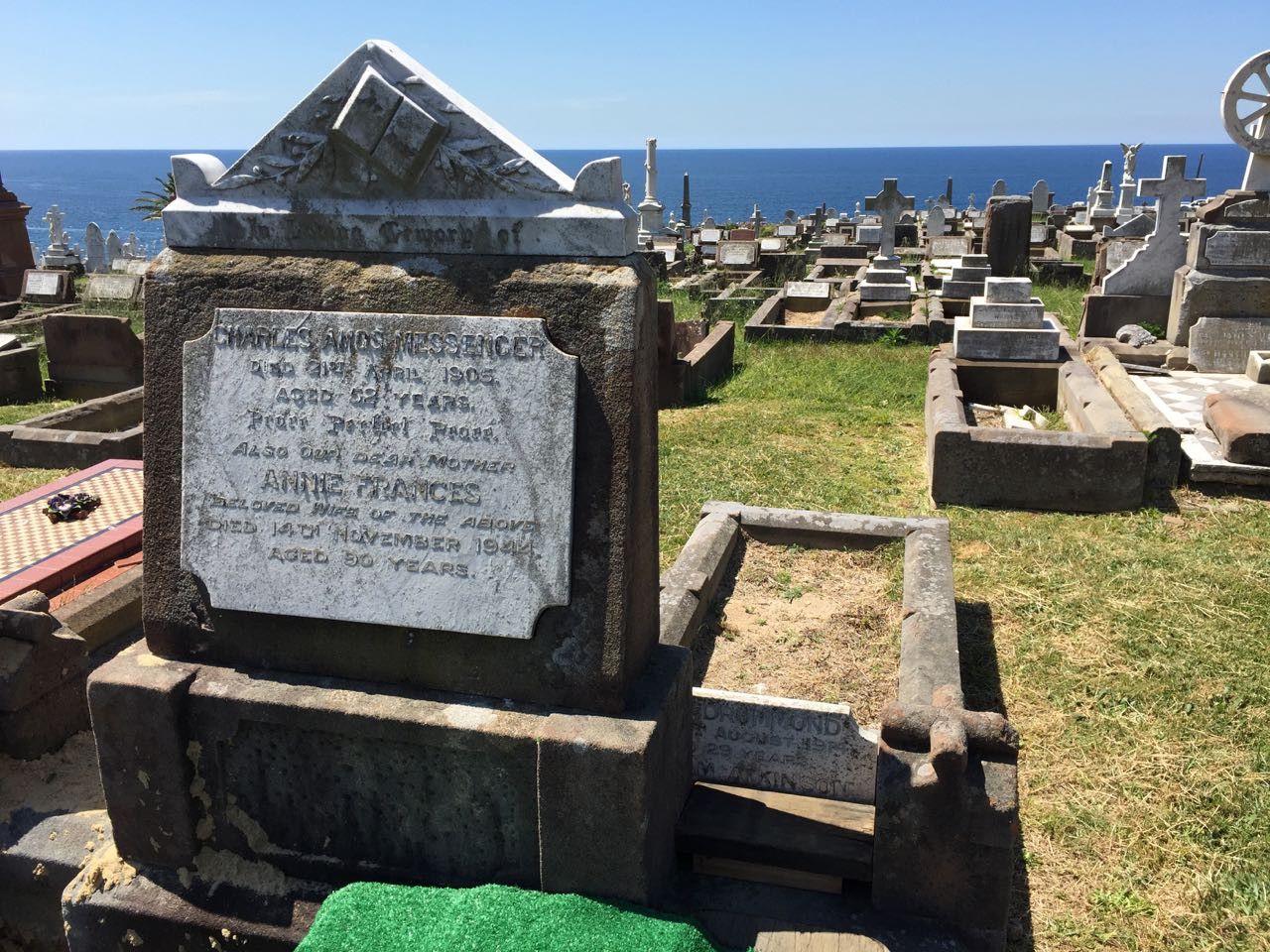
Messenger's grave in Waverley Cemetery stating that he died on 21 April 1905 aged 52 years

His principal performances in Sydney were in a waterman's skiff race at the national regatta where he rowed third to Power (15 lbs) and Harry Pearce (55 lbs). In the third division of the Walker Whiskey race, he finished third to Michael Rush and R. Edwards. At the Grafton 1881 regatta, he started in the outrigger race against Rush and Elias Laycock, and was badly beaten.

=== Sculling Championship of New Zealand ===
In 1882 Messenger travelled to Auckland in New Zealand where he competed under the assumed name of ‘Carter.’ His trainer was Harry Floyd who was associated with many of the Sydney scullers. At the Mercury Bay regatta on 26 January 1882, Messenger beat A White in an outrigger race. A later match race between them for £100 a side had the same result as did another race at the Auckland Regatta. Later it was revealed who ‘Carter’ was. In March 1882 Messenger and William Hearn raced in Wellington for the Single Sculls Championship of New Zealand. See New Zealand Sculling Championship. The stake was £100 a side and Hearn won without any trouble. Messenger's rowing weight was 11 stone (70 kg)

=== Messenger defeats Beach in a strange race ===
One of the strangest races ever recorded was that between Messenger and Bill Beach in March 1883 in the Anniversary regatta held in Sydney. Largan, the English sculler, was also in the race, but had his boat cut in two by a 14-ft. open sailing boat shortly before the start. He, however, started in a borrowed outrigger, but retired after going 200 yards.

The weather was very rough, and, after changing places repeatedly, Messenger, who was leading, had his boat burst open and swamped forward by a sea, the after part sticking up in the air about three feet. Beach who had broken his slide and was pulling on a fixed seat, then shot up to him and yelled out, "I've beaten you now." Messenger was, of course, inclined to give in, but the people on the steamer yelled at him to go on in hopes something would happen to Beach also. Sure enough they were right, for in a few minutes the stern of his boat sank and the bow cocked up at an angle of 45 degrees.

Then, Messenger seeing hope once more, removed his feet from the straps, took off his roller slides and held them in his mouth, and then standing up in his boat, half of which was completely buried under water, he turned round and sat straddle legs across the boat, his legs dangling in the water, a tempting bait for any shark in the vicinity. He faced the nose of the boat, and after an hour's hard rowing, during which the water was breaking over him, he rowed his boat stern first the last quarter of a mile, and passing the flagship a winner of one of the most singularly contested races ever recorded. After swamping, Beach gave up the contest.

== Establishing the Messenger Boatshed ==
Despite this, Messenger returned to Melbourne, collected his wife and child (Bill) and shifted to Sydney. He set up a boatshed and boatbuilding business and a home at Mort Bay, Balmain where his second and third son, Charles Jnr and "Dally" (April 1883), were born.

Due to the intensity of Sydney development, in 1884 Messenger dismantled his business and home in Balmain and floated it in stages to Double Bay. Here his business prospered as enthusiastic young people of Sydney took up sculling and sailing in boats mainly built by the Messengers.

All five Messenger sons, Bill, Charles, Dally, Ernie, and Wally, became apprentice boatbuilders to their father.

=== Penrith on the Nepean River ===
In an attempt to capitalise on the exuberance of a large following of boat enthusiasts, from May to December 1889, while retaining the Double Bay business, Charles Messenger became the licensee of Messenger's Tattersall's Hotel in Penrith on the Nepean River. It was here at Penrith that Messenger became part of the support team for his former competitor and outstanding rower, Bill Beach, who successfully competed for the Championship of the World. He then returned to Double Bay.

== Additional Research ==
The Demise of Professional Rowing
