= George Whelch =

George Edwin Whelch (December 1879 – 6 October 1960) was one of six New Zealand oarsman who attempted to win the World Professional Single Sculls title. He was born near Akaroa where he lived for most of his life. In 1903 he married Sarah Gundy and they had two children.

== Amateur record ==
Whelch had won the Dominion (i.e. New Zealand) single sculls Championship three times (once against William Webb), and twice won the double sculls rowing bow with Jack Woodill. By 1908 he had started in fifty-six regatta events, of which he won forty-six and had come second in a further seven. He then turned professional.

== New Zealand champion ==
His first professional race, for the Australian title, was in Newcastle, Australia, against Ben Thoroughgood who won by three lengths despite a game attempt by Whelch to overtake him. William Webb had gained the New Zealand professional single sculls title in December 1906 and in August 1907 had won the World Title. Whelch then challenged Webb for the New Zealand title but Webb declined as he did not wish to risk a loss on a lesser title which would have damaged his reputation as World Champion. Webb therefore forfeited the New Zealand title to Whelch. He (Whelch) formalised this position by later winning a race which was for the New Zealand Sculling Championship, held at Akaroa in April 1909. His opponent was William (Billy) Fogwell of New South Wales. Both Whelch and Fogwell had been associated as training partners with William Webb and Richard Arnst respectively during the earlier Whanganui races for the World Championship. See also World Sculling Championship (Professional)

== World title challenge ==
Whelch challenged Arnst for the World Title who had taken it off Webb. The usual competition rules were agreed to for a stake of £300 a side with the match being scheduled for 2 April 1910. Unusually it was agreed to run the race on Akaroa Harbour as normally such races were held on rivers. The course was stated to be a little over three miles long. Akaroa was the home town of Whelch. Bad weather delayed the race for a couple of days which disappointed the large crowd who had gathered. When the race did finally get underway Whelch gained the initial advantage but Arnst was able to overcome the deficit and went on to win easily. Whelch, despite not winning had not disgraced himself; he had simply been beaten by a better man.

== New Zealand title defence ==
A year later, in April 1911, Whelch and Fogwell met again at Akaroa for the New Zealand Championship and a stake of £200 a side. Fogwell won. Holders of national titles were not always citizens of the country concerned. Whelch then retired from active racing but gave service as coach to the Akaroa Rowing Club for many years.

== 1910 match commemorated ==
The World Title match was commemorated in 1986 by the Akaroa Rowing Club in the form of a trophy. The club instigated the Arnst/Whelch Memorial Trophy, which consists of a miniature single sculls boat and oars made of copper, mounted on a granite base and all enclosed in a glass and rimu case. It was competed for annually by single scullers over a three-mile course from the Kaik to the wharf, a very similar course to that of the 1910 race.
