= Alf Felton =

Australian rower

Alfred D. Felton
- Born: 28 August 1889; Walker St, North Sydney, NSW, Australia
- Died: 15 December 1951 (aged 62); Brisbane, Queensland, Australia
- Title: World champion sculler
- Term: 1919 - 1920
- Predecessor: Ernest Barry
- Successor: Ernest Barry

Alfred D Felton (1889-1951) was the first Australian after World War I to win the professional World Sculling Championship. Seven other Australians had held the title before the war.

== Life and racing ==
Felton was born in Walker Street, North Sydney, on 28 August 1889. After he grew up he was employed as a blacksmith's striker which helped develop his physique and strength for rowing. By eighteen years of age he stood six feet two inches tall and weighed thirteen and a half stone. He became a pupil of former world champion Peter Kemp. Felton was involved in the normal smaller regattas and match races that were the bread and butter of the professional scullers. His first races of note were those held at Foxton, New Zealand when he was chosen as one of nine men from Australia to represent their country at the Foxton Handicap Races held on 2 and 3 December 1909. Eight New Zealand men made up the field and Felton was successful in beating all to take the £150 first prize and a cup valued at £25.

From these races, Felton gained the reputation of a dashing sprinter and there was some doubt about his stamina in races longer than two miles. In June 1911 he raced Frank Hagney over the full length of the Parramatta course of about three and a quarter miles. He won easily. In April 1912 he beat William (Billy) Fogwell for the Northern Rivers (NSW) Championship. However he was criticised for delaying the start of the race by over an hour.

Felton was involved in an unpleasant affair at the end of 1912. Harry Pearce had been the Australian Champion since 1909 and had challenged Ernest Barry for the world title. Not long before Pearce's departure for England, Felton, Charles Towns, and Jim Paddon all challenged Pearce for his Australian Championship. The lateness of the challenges was intended to force Pearce to forfeit his domestic title so that the challengers could decide among themselves who should be the new champion. Rather than jeopardise his World Title chances Pearce forfeited his title which was then claimed by Felton. Felton and Towns raced in January 1913 and the match was described as a midget verses a giant. Towns was much smaller and weighed less than Felton who won the race by four lengths. Yet because of high winds which blew Towns off course the question of whom was the better was not really answered. It was somewhat answered when Jim Paddon handsomely beat Felton by two minutes in a race held in February 1913. Thus Felton lost the local championship. Pearce and Felton had an actual race in Sydney in September 1914 for £200 a side but no championship was involved. Pearce initially led by after one mile Felton took the advantage and won comfortably in a time of 20m.30s. See Also Australian Sculling Championship.

In another race in February 1915 Felton was again criticized when he delayed by about half an hour a race against Robert Ford. The delay allowed Felton to take advantage of the change in the tide and wind as he was heavier and able to make better progress than his opponent.

Felton announced his retirement from professional sculling in March 1915 but indicated that before retiring he would be prepared to row Charles Towns for £250 a side on the Parramatta River. It was supposed to be a sportsman's chance to reverse the 1913 result. The very high stake for an ordinary sculler's match not involving any title was unusual and likely indicated that Felton was not all that keen on a race. Nevertheless, the Towns camp raised the money and the match was set down for 26 June 1915. Once again Felton prevaricated at the start and nearly refused to race, disregarding the instructions of umpire Bill Beach. When the race finally got underway Towns won and it was a popular win as it was felt that Felton had behaved badly.

== World War I ==
By October 1915, Felton had joined the Engineers’ Division of the Australian Naval and Military Expeditionary Force and served in Europe until the end of the war. The war put all professional sculling on hold and no title matches were held during that time. During the latter part of Felton's service he had participated in war-service regattas on the Thames and also at the International Regatta in Paris in July 1919 which inspired him to challenge for the World Sculling Championship after the armistice.

== The World Title Match ==
Ernest Barry had been the title holder before the war and had not retired so was still the champion. Barry had also served in the war but had been invalided in 1918 after suffering shell shock and shrapnel wounds. He suggested that he would need at least six months to get back to full fitness for a match. Barry at thirty-seven years of age knew he was nearing the end of his sculling career. The agreed date for the match was 27 October 1919. The course was to be the famous Championship Course on the Thames in London which was about four and a quarter miles long. The stake was to be £500 a side.

There was some disquiet in Australia over this challenge as many felt that Jim Paddon was a better sculler and as a previous world title challenger he had more right to a race than Felton did. However, Felton was on the spot as he had not yet been repatriated home, and the cost of his challenge was only about half of what it would have cost to send an Australian to England. Felton also had the advantage of being acclimatised to the Northern conditions. There was some difficulty in Felton raising the stake and expenses but eventually the Australian Prime Minister and the general public who were both keen to see the title return to Australia came to his aide and provided the cash.

The day of the race suited the Australian. Felton chose the sheltered Middlesex shore side of the course which proved an advantage on a cold blustery day. Being heavier he was able to build a lead in the calmer water. Barry on the other had hand had the rougher conditions and he shipped much water during the race. Felton easily won by about six lengths although he could have made it more had he been so inclined, in a time of 25m.40s and thus became the Sculling Champion of the World, the eighth Australian to hold the title.

== The Return Match ==
As was common at the time Felton offered Barry a return match but with the proviso that it was to be raced in Sydney. Felton returned home to a hero's welcome and after the usual festivities found himself challenged by Jim Paddon for a race on the Parramatta. The local rowing fraternity felt that Paddon had the right to a challenge but Felton declined and announced the agreement with Barry. It would appear that the two had made the arrangement with a view to maximising their financial returns. For example, motion picture rights, gate money, paid speaking engagements, and exhibitions were some of the ways the Champion and ex-Champion could reward themselves. The Sydney rowing people found that Barry had strong financial support from England and as they were keen to see the contest, support for the Paddon challenge evaporated.

Felton and Barry met on 28 August 1920 over the full course on the Parramatta and for a stake of £500 a side. A crowd estimated between one hundred and one hundred and fifty thousand persons lined all vantage points to see the first Championship race held in Sydney since 1907. A number were also on board steamers that followed the race. Unfortunately the race did not live up to expectations. Felton led for the first mile and a half and then Barry fouled him. Both men appealed to the umpire. Felton stopped rowing believing he had won on the foul but the umpire, Bill Beach ordered the men to continue rather than making a ruling. He later said that they were in neutral water and the foul in no way affected the result of the race. It was likely he believed the foul was accidental as an intentional foul would have cost the perpetrator the race. The umpire's decision was final. Felton did not continue to scull on at speed but Barry did and he crossed the line about twelve lengths ahead and thus regained the World Title. His time was 24m.32s. Felton's trainer was Richard Arnst, a former world champion, who believed his man should have got the decision as be believed that Barry had intentionally fouled Felton. Felton accused Beach of partiality and applied for a Supreme Court injunction to stop the stake money being paid to Barry. Felton was desirous of a re-match for the money only rather than the money and the title but eventually he withdrew his claim so the case did not proceed and Barry received his cash.

Richard Arnst had issued a newspaper challenge before the race to the winner of the Felton/Barry match. It looks as if he had expected Barry to win and as Arnst and Barry had previously raced twice and the score was one each they needed a further race to decide who was the better. Barry declined to race and because three months passed without him accepting the challenge Arnst claimed the title by forfeit. This was within the rules, such as they were, at the time. Barry had returned to England and had announced his retirement from the sport. Arnst held the Title for one race, lost it in the next to Darcy Hadfield who in turn lost it to Jim Paddon. Paddon held off two challenges before accepting one from Alf Felton in 1924. Before this occurred Felton was involved in another race.

== The Australasian Championship ==
(Australasian is Australia and New Zealand.) Before having another chance at the world title Felton travelled to New Zealand after arranging a race with Pat Hannan which was billed as the Australasian Championship. This was a manufactured title based on Hannan's claim to the New Zealand Title which he had actually lost but only by forfeit, and the highly dubious claim that Felton was the Australian Champion. His reasoning was that as Paddon was now the World Champion, he (Paddon) was ineligible to hold the domestic title. Because he had been the previous holder, Felton argued that the title reverted to him. This argument was not accepted by many of the Sydney scullers and previously a number of world champions had simultaneously held national titles. The match was raced on 28 April 1923 and was held on Nelson Harbour for a purse of £500. Felton crossed the line first but was disqualified for cutting Hannan off. This race was notable in that it was the first New Zealand sports event broadcast on radio.

== The Third World Title Match ==
Alf Felton had his third World Title match after he had challenged Jim Paddon. Felton had persuaded a group of Brisbane promoters to stage a world championship match as part of the Brisbane Centennial celebrations. The match was unusual in that it was held on the Brisbane River – the first such match on the river. The date was 12 August 1924 and the course was slightly shorter than normal at about three miles. Felton had claimed to be the Queensland Champion which was considered cheeky. He further caused controversy when he refused to row with Bill Beach as umpire. Paddon as Champion had the right to nominate most of the terms, but in order to secure the match agreed to Felton's demands and another umpire was found. A very large crowd was on hand to witness the race but it was not much of a race. Felton had the reputation of a fast sprinter but he showed none of his old form when Paddon took the lead after only one hundred yards and the result was never in doubt. Paddon easily defeated Felton in a time of 17m.55s. After this defeat Felton retired from professional sculling. He died in 1951. See also World Sculling Championship.
