= The Sweetheart of Sigma Chi (film) =

1933 film directed by Edwin L. Marin

- Theatrical release poster
- Directed by: Edwin L. Marin
- Screenplay by: Luther Reed; Albert DeMond
- Story by: George Waggner
- Produced by: William T. Lackey
- Starring: Mary Carlisle; Buster Crabbe; Charles Starrett; Florence Lake; Eddie Tamblyn; Sally Starr
- Cinematography: Gilbert Warrenton
- Edited by: J. Edwin Robbins
- Production company: Monogram Pictures
- Distributed by: Monogram Pictures
- Release date: October 26, 1933
- Running time: 77 minutes
- Country: United States
- Language: English

The Sweetheart of Sigma Chi is a 1933 American pre-Code comedy film directed by Edwin L. Marin and written by Luther Reed and Albert DeMond. The film stars Mary Carlisle, Buster Crabbe, Charles Starrett, Florence Lake, Eddie Tamblyn and Sally Starr. The film was released on October 26, 1933, by Monogram Pictures.

Beautiful co-ed Vivian is known as the "Sigma Siren" because of her reputation as a Rawley campus flirt and femme fatale. All the members of the university rowing team fall for Vivian, except Bob North, who is devoted to his sport. One day, Vivian tries to attract Bob's attention by pretending to drown in a river, but after rescuing her, Bob realizes that he has been tricked. Later, when Bob returns Vivian's dress to her sorority, the Theta Beta House, the other girls open the package and tease him. Driven to distraction by his suspicion that Vivian is merely toying with him, and that the person she is really infatuated with is Morley, a Kappa man, Bob's performance on the crew begins to falter. As a result, he is taken off the team and replaced by Morley. When Bob takes back the pin he gave to Vivian, she becomes angry and tells him that she and Morley are engaged. On the day of the big homecoming race, Bob is reinstated on the team because Morley has suffered a broken arm. Still distracted by thoughts of Vivian, Bob rows poorly and causes his team to fall behind, until he is told that Vivian has rejected Morley and will be waiting for him at the finish line. Newly inspired by the news, Bob rows his team to an easy win.

== Cast ==
- Mary Carlisle as Vivian
- Buster Crabbe as Bob North
- Charles Starrett as Morley
- Florence Lake as Dizzy
- Eddie Tamblyn as Harry
- Sally Starr as Madge
- Mary Blackford as Bunny
- Tom Dugan as Trainer
- Burr McIntosh as Professor
- Major Goodsell as Coach
- Grady Sutton as Pledge
- Purnell Pratt as Doctor
- Franklin Parker as House Prexy
