= Australian Sculling Championship =

The Australian Sculling Championship (Professional) Title was first recognised in the early 1850s. George Mulhall was the first champion due to his dominance in heavy boats. From 1858 when racing was held on the Parramatta River, Richard Green became the Champion. He was later the first international contestant for the World Sculling Championship and that race was held on the Thames in 1863. Thus began a long association of Australian Champions who were either contestants in, or actual holders of, the World Title.

From 1866 William Hickey was the Champion, a position he held until being disposed by Michael Rush in 1873. In turn the title was held by Edward Trickett and Elias C. Laycock. Trickett won the World Title in 1876, and held it until 1880, and from then on any Australian holders of that title were generally considered to be the Australian Champion as well. These people were:

Date (DMY)	Winner	Comment
16-8-1884	Bill Beach	
11-2-1888	Peter Kemp	
27-10-1888	Henry Ernest Searle	Died 1889
25-4-1890	Peter Kemp	
15-12-1890	John McLean	
28-04-1891	Jim Stanbury	Held until 1896
7-9-1901	George Towns	

For the rest of the time the Title was in existence it became a more identifiable entity mostly, but not totally, separated from the World Title. The holders were:

Date	Champion	Comment
1903	Richard Tresidder	
1908	Ben Thououghgood	
1909	Harry Pearce	
1913	Alf Felton	Later World Champion
1913	Jim Paddon	Later World Champion
1926	Alfred Burns	
1937	Evans Paddon	Later World Champion
1949	James Saul	Later World Champion
1950	Robert Kemp	
1951	James Saul	again
1952	Robert Kemp	again
1952	Evans Fischer	Later World Champion
1953	James Skinner	

Only the holders are listed here but there were a much greater number of contests as matches were run on the challenge system. One man would challenge the holder for the title and for money.

As with the world Title there was less interest in the Australian Tile after the Second World War. In general, professional sculling declined in popularity and eventually the Title lapsed as scullers and the public became less interested in such races. Amateur honours such as Olympic selection were much more attractive.
