= Charles Stephenson (rower) =

New Zealand rower

- Born: 20 March 1865; Auckland, New Zealand
- Died: 11 December 1932 (aged 67); Detroit, Michigan, United States
- Title: Professional Sculling Champion of New Zealand
- Term: 1890–1891
- Predecessor: William Hearn
- Successor: Tom Sullivan

Charles Stephenson (born 20 March 1865) was a New Zealand rower. He was born in Hobson Street, Auckland. He passed most of his boyhood at the Thames, and after leaving school went to the Northern Wairoa district, where he took to a bushman's life. His work in the kauri bushes was varied by an occasional spell as a boatman on the river, and so he got his first lessons in rowing. For three years he was in the service of the Hon. E. Mitchelson, at Dargaville, and during that time got a good deal of rough practice in rowing. His first race was rowed, with J. Wilson as a partner, in the pairs at the Wairoa Regatta in April 1887. Their principal opponents were the Brothers Brown, who were recognised at the time as the "bosses" of the river. To the surprise of everyone young Stephenson and his mate won easily. The Browns were not satisfied with their defeat, and a match was made with their conquerors for £50 a-side, to come off a month after the regatta. This had the same result, and Stephenson's reputation began to grow. In January 1888, he was one of the Northern Wairoa Whaleboat Crew which finished third at Auckland Anniversary Regatta. Waitemata winning and North Shore rowing second. After this he went back to the bush; but in November 1888, he and two friends left the Wairoa, intending to go to Tasmania. Stephenson, however, got no further than Sydney, where he determined to try his luck as a professional sculler.

The Spencer Brothers, who brought out Searle and Matterson, finding that he gave good promise, took him 'up' and backed him against Joe Kemp, brother of the ex-champion, for £100 a-side. The match was rowed over the Parramatta course on 30 August 1889, and resulted in a three lengths win for Stephenson, the time for the first mile being 5min 43sec, and the full distance being rowed in 20min 24.5sec. On 30 October 1889 Stephenson sustained a defeat by John McLean, who beat him by three lengths, after a good race, over the same course, in 21min 53sec. For this match Stephenson was backed by Mr Warby, of Sydney, who was his chief supporter for a match for the Championship of New Zealand. His opponent was William Hearn. Stephenson was thus, as compared with his opponent, a novice sculler but he won by three lengths in a time of 22min 22.75sec. The race was run in Wellington on 5 February 1890. Stephenson next defended his title against Tom Sullivan on the Parramatta River, Sydney on 11 May 1891. The stake was £100 a side. Stephenson was defeated by Sullivan. See also New Zealand Sculling Championship.

Stephenson then travelled overseas. On 1 September 1892 he raced Ned Hanlan in a two miles race in Toronto, Canada and he (Stephenson) lost by two lengths.
