= Charles R. Harding =

Victorian-era English rowing champion

Charles Richard Harding
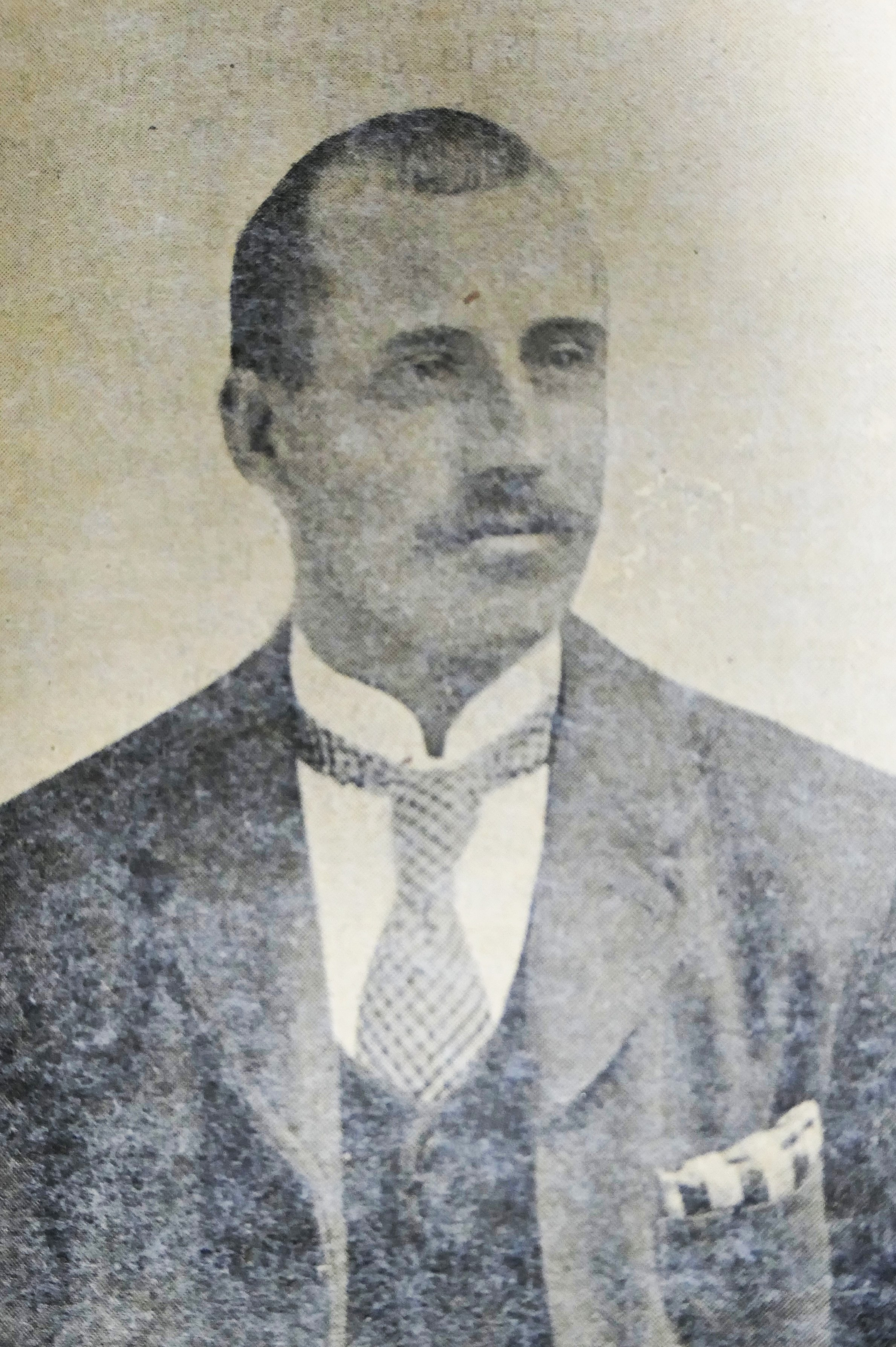
- Born: 1 July 1867; Chelsea, England
- Died: 1944 (aged 76–77); Ealing, London
- Other names: "Wag" Harding
- Title: Professional Sculling Champion of England
- Term: 1895–1896
- Predecessor: Tom Sullivan (rower)
- Successor: Jim Stanbury

Charles R. Harding (aka 'Wag' Harding) (1 July 1867 – 1944) was an English professional single sculler who became the Champion of England and was a contender for the World Sculling Championship. He was born in London in 1867 and his occupation was that of a waterman. Like many of the professional English scullers, he had won the Doggett's Coat and Badge (in 1888), but at 5 ft 5 ½ in and 9 st 5 lb he was not regarded as one of the heavy men. He made a name for himself in 1883, when he, at 16 years old, won the Chelsea Coat and Badge, and a year later, the Putney Coat and Badge. He was reported in the mid-1890s that "he pulls a beautiful even stroke, gets well over his sculls, while his leg-work is greatly admired".

Harding trained the New Zealander Tom Sullivan when Sullivan had challenged George Bubear for the English Sculling Championship, which Sullivan won in September 1893. Thereafter, Harding himself challenged Sullivan for the English championship title. They sculled for the title on the Tyne River in February 1895, and Sullivan lost to his trainer. In September 1895 they had a re-match on the Championship Course on the Thames and again Harding won. His time was 22 minutes 59 seconds. In July 1896, Harding challenged the Australian Jim Stanbury for the World Sculling Championship Title. The race again took place on the Thames but Stanbury defended his title and won the wager of £500 a side. At stake was the English Title as well.

He also competed for the Searle Memorial Cup (created in memory of Australian champion Henry Ernest Searle, who died of typhoid contracted on his journey home after competing in England. "Wag" Harding won it 3 times running, which meant he got to keep it. It is now on display at The River & Rowing Museum, Henley, as part of the extensive Harding collection, currently on loan from his descendants.

The Henley River & Rowing Museum is due to close in September 2025 & his descendents seemingly have no option but to put the Harding collection up for auction, since no other possible home for it has been identified.
