= Wellington Rowing Club =

Coordinates: 41.28824°S 174.77927°E

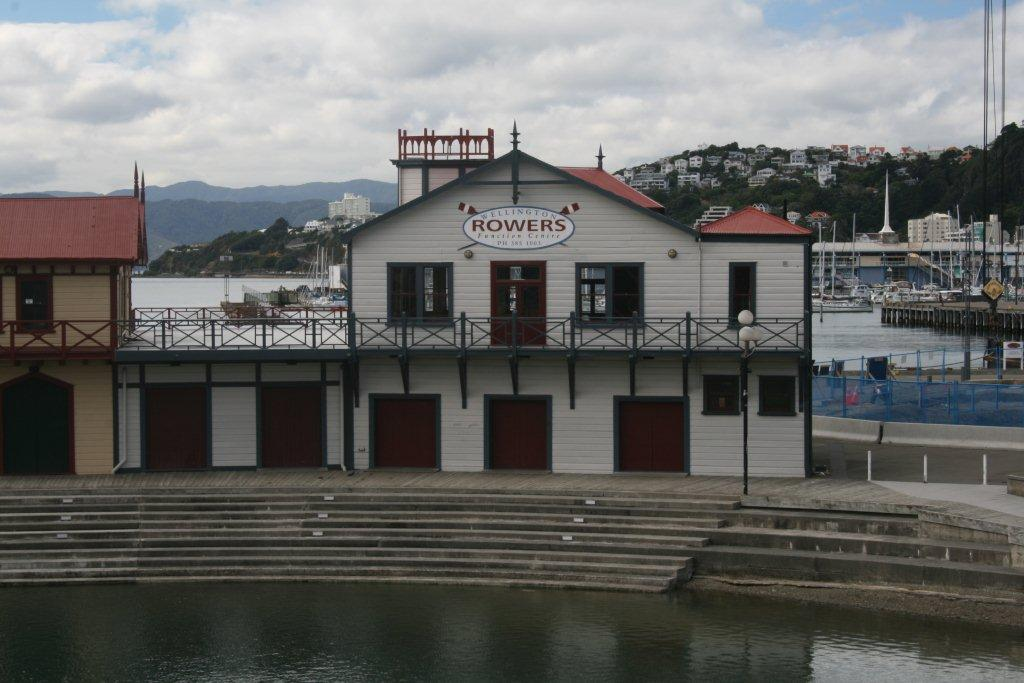

- Location: Wellington, New Zealand
- Founded: 1885
- Affiliations: Rowing NZ, WRA
- Website: wellingtonrowing.org.nz

Notable members
- Dick Joyce; Ross Collinge; John Hunter; Simon Dickie; Alec McLean; Tom Sullivan; William Hearn; John Clark; Tay Wilson

The Wellington Rowing Club is a rowing club situated on Wellington Harbour, New Zealand. The current building, is classified as a "Category I" ("places of 'special or outstanding historical or cultural heritage significance or value'") historic place by the New Zealand Historic Places Trust.

== History ==
The Wellington Rowing Club was first established in October 1871 as a professional club. Founded by James Stewart, a prominent sawmiller "the main reason for forming the new club was to enable ‘working men’ to take part in aquatic sports".

The most famous crew of the Wellington Rowing Club was the Dolly Varden crew. Imported in 1873, the Dolly Varden became the most famous four-oared boat in colonial New Zealand. The Dolly Varden was the first boat in New Zealand with sliding seats. In this boat the crew of H Woods (stroke), J Walker (3), William Hearn (rower) (2), M Moore (bow) won the Interprovincial Championship of New Zealand in 1876, and H Woods (stroke), J Walker (3), J McGrath (2), William Hearn (rower) (bow) won in 1877.

The Dolly Varden was later sold and by 1880 the Wellington Rowing Club (professional), as then constituted, went out of existence.

The Wellington Rowing Club was later re-established as an amateur club in July 1885 by James Stewart. 2010 marked the 125th anniversary of the amateur club.

== Club colours ==
The club's colours consist of a maroon singlet with a white horizontal band. The original colours of the club when it was established in 1885 were (salmon) pink and white. The club commemorated these origins by changing back to the original colours for the 125th season (2009/10).

== Clubhouse ==
The WRC building has been housed in a number of locations throughout its 125-year history. The club opened its first permanent clubhouse at the bottom of Cuba Street, Wellington on 17 December 1887. Later in 1889, due to ongoing harbour reclamations, the clubhouse was moved "some little distance seaward" to its site just north of Jervois Quay. This was the home for the club until 1931.

== Wellington Naval Artillery Volunteers ==
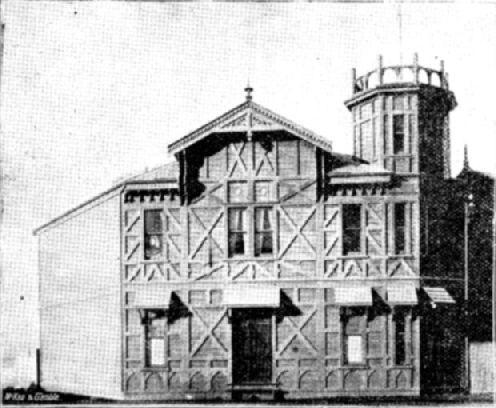
The Wellington Naval Artillery, 1897.

Built in 1894 to a design by Frederick de Jersey Clere, the building was built as a base for the Wellington Naval Artillery Volunteers, a response prompted by a Defence report in 1884 that recommended strengthening Wellington's harbour defences to help prevent a possible Russian invasion.

The building was never used for this purpose and in 1927 the building became the first home of the Wellington Free Ambulance. After a short stay, the Free Ambulance moved into its new purpose-built home (now St. John Heineken Hotel). At the same time the Wellington Rowing Club took over as custodian of the 'Old Navals Hall' in 1931 and remains such to this day.

== Famous Members ==
The Wellington Rowing Club boasts numerous international representatives and Olympic medalists.

New Zealand's first international sculling representative was William Bridson. Bridson won the Amateur Sculling Championship of Victoria in 1891.

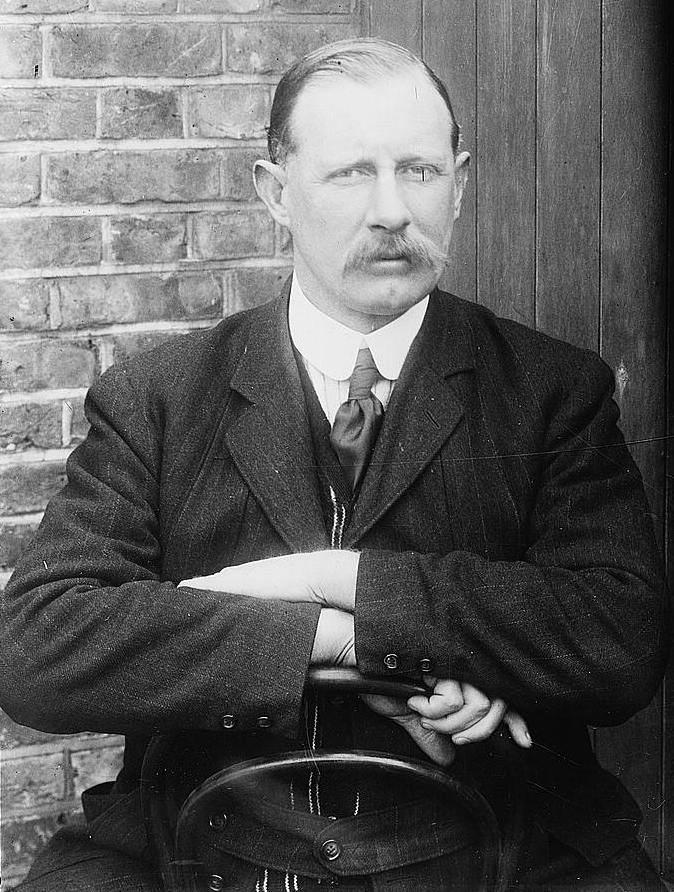
Tom Sullivan, Professional Sculling Champion of England, 1893

Tom Sullivan, along with Bridson, was a member of the famous WRC crew who won all eight Rowing New Zealand (then New Zealand Amateur Rowing Association) championship titles between 1889 and 1890. Sullivan has been recognised as “New Zealand's first sculler of international note”. Sullivan left the club in 1890 to become a professional sculler. He was the first New Zealander to challenge for the World Sculling Championship. In 1893 he won the English Sculling Championship.

George Lauchlan was the manager of the famous 1925 New Zealand eight that travelled to Australia and won the New South Wales Championship.

Tris Hegglun and Owen Wares were members of the club before World War II. During the war they represented the 2nd New Zealand Expeditionary Force (NZEF) which beat the Cairo River Club and an all-Egyptian representative crew to win the Freyberg Cup. Today the Sir Bernard Freyberg Cup is allocated to the champion single sculls at the New Zealand National Club Championships.

WRC's 'golden era' was without doubt the 1960s and 1970s. The club won the Champion Eight event in 1967 and 1969. The club later won the Boss Rooster in 1972.

Pete Delaney was the club's first Olympian, representing New Zealand at the 1964 Tokyo Olympics.

In 1967 the New Zealand "All Blacks" crew, including WRC members Pete Delaney (Bow), Graeme Shaw (2), Tom Just (3), John Hunter (5) and Alan Boykett (cox), won the first FISA North American Championships, St. Catharines, Canada, and the USRowing National Championships, Philadelphia.

In 1968 John Hunter (5) and Tom Just (2) represented New Zealand in the eight at the 1968 Summer Olympics which finished fourth.

John Hunter (5) and Simon Dickie (cox) were members of the New Zealand eight that won gold at the USRowing National Championships in 1970, the FISA European Championships, Copenhagen, Denmark, the International German Championships, Duisburg, West Germany and the International Austrian Championships, Klagenfurt, Austria in 1971.

At the 1972 Summer Olympics Dick Joyce (6), John Hunter (5) and Simon Dickie (cox) won the eight-oar event with Ross Collinge (2) winning a silver in the coxless four event.

At the 1976 Summer Olympics, Alec McLean and Simon Dickie won a bronze in the eight-oar event.
