= Ernest Barry (footballer) =

Maltese footballer

Personal information
- Full name: Ernest Barry
- Date of birth: 1 July 1967 (age 59)
- Place of birth: Malta
- Position: Goalkeeper

Senior career*
Years	Team	Apps	(Gls)
1987–1989	Naxxar Lions	16	(0)
1989–1990	Melita	0	(0)
1990–1993	Sliema Wanderers	35	(0)
1993–1994	Mellieħa	11	(0)
1994–1995	St. George's	16	(0)
1995–2001	Sliema Wanderers	148	(0)
2001	Pietà Hotspurs	2	(0)
2001–2003	Valletta	16	(0)
2003–2004	Balzan Youths	22	(0)
2004–2005	Sliema Wanderers	2	(0)

International career^{‡}
1996–2001	Malta	22	(0)

Managerial career
- 2009: Floriana (goalkeeper coach)
- * Club domestic league appearances and goals as of 18 August 2009 ‡ National team caps and goals as of 18 August 2009

Ernest Barry (born 1 July 1967) is a Maltese former professional footballer who played as a goalkeeper. He was most recently the player/goalkeeper coach for Floriana in the Maltese Football League.
