= Mort Bay =

Bay in Papua New Guinea

Mort Bay is a bay located in Morobe Province, Papua New Guinea. It was named after Commander Morton C. Mumma of the United States Navy during World War II.
