= William Hearn (rower) =

New Zealand rower

- Born: 1850; Paisley, Scotland
- Title: Professional Sculling Champion of New Zealand
- Term: 1881–1890
- Predecessor: Albert White
- Successor: Charles Stephenson (rower)

William Hearn (born 13 May 1850 in Paisley, Scotland) was a champion professional sculler of New Zealand, who emigrated to Victoria at a young age. He came to New Zealand in 1862, and had been a resident in Wellington since January 1876, nearly all the time having been employed by Messrs Greenfield and Stewart, timber merchants.

== Achievements ==
- 1867, at Hokitika Regatta, won All-comers Sculling Race, £20.
- 1869, at Hokitika, won All-comers Sculling Race, £20; also stroked winning crew in Four-oared Race.
- 1870, at Hokitika Regatta, won All-comers Sculling Race, £20.
- 1871, at Greymouth Regatta, won All-comers Sculling Race, £20, and stroked winning crew Four-oared Race; at Hokitika Regatta
- 1872, at Greymouth Regatta, won All-comers Sculling Race, £20; Hokitika, won All-comers Sculling Race, £20.
- 1873, at Greymouth Regatta, won All-comers Sculling Race £12.
- 1874, at Kaiapoi Regatta, won Champion Sculls, beating three others, and rowed No. 2 in winning crew for Four-oared Champion Race of £150.
- 1875, at Greymouth Regatta, rowed second to Jackson in All-comers Sculling Race, for £20.
- 1876, at Wellington Regatta, won Champion Sculls, rowed No. 2 in Dolly Varden crew, and won Champion Out-rigged Fours, £150, and In-rigged Fours £100.
- 1877, at Nelson Regatta, rowed in winning crew for Champion Outrigged Fours, £150; Inrigged Fours, £75 and cup; and Out-rigged Pairs.
- 1877, at Wellington Regatta, won Champion Sculls; also in crews for Out-rigged Fours, In-rigged Pairs, and In-rigged Fours.
- 1878, at Wanganui Regatta, won Sculling Race, Four-oared In-rigged Race, and Four- oared In-rigged Race, for Ladies' Plate.
- 1878, at Wellington Regatta, rowed in Dolly Varden crew, winning Champion Four-oared Outrigger Race, Inrigged Fours, and Champion Sculls.
- 1879, rowed and defeated Wing, of Melbourne, in a match for £25 a side.
- 1879, at Wellington Regatta, won Champion Sculls; rowed bow, and won In-rigged Fours; same year was defeated by Charles A. Messenger over a two-mile course on the Yarra.
- 1880, at Wellington Regatta, won Champion Sculls;
- 1880, at Wanganui Regatta, won Sculling Race.
- 1881, in July, rowed and defeated Albert White in Port Nicholson Harbour for Championship of New Zealand and £100 a side.
- 1882, beat Messenger over the same course for Championship and £100 a-side.
- 1885, at Riverton, rowed Harrington for Championship and £100 a-side, winning easily.
- 1887, won All-comers Sculling Race, Riverton; Palamountain, 2; Beere, 3; Harrington, 4; Macleay, 5.,
- 1888, took part in Handicap Out-rigger Sculling Race at Grafton Regatta, Clarence River, New South Wales, the handicap being as follows : — Ned Hanlan, scratch; Neilson, 3.5 lengths; Hearn, 4.5 lengths; Henry Ernest Searle, 7.5 lengths. Result— Searle, 1; Neilson, 2; Hearn, 3. Hanlan did not start. On 3 January 1888, at same regatta, rowed in Skiff Race (handicap). Hearn, carrying top weight (301bs), finished third, the feather weight winning. There was a field of eight.
- 1888, rowed in Centennial Regatta for Championship of Australia, the result being- Peter Kemp, 1; Hearn, 2; Neilson, 3.

Out of 43 events mentioned Hearn was victorious in 38, and defeated in only five. Such a successful career has fallen to the lot of very few scullers, either professional or amateur. His last match was on 5 February 1890 when he raced Charles Stephenson for the Championship of New Zealand. The stake was £100 a side and Stephenson won.

Hearn was set to compete in January 1907 against champion sculler Jim Stanbury but the race does not appear to have happened.

== See also ==
- New Zealand Sculling Championship
