= Richard Arnst =

New Zealand rower and racing cyclist (1883–1953)

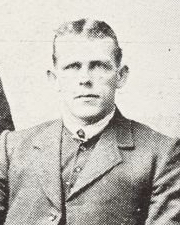
- Arnst, c. 1909
- Born: 28 November 1883; Tai Tapu, New Zealand
- Died: 7 December 1953 (aged 70)
- Other name: Dick Arnst
- Title: World champion sculler
- Term: 1908–1912 and 1921–1922
- Predecessor: William Webb (rower) & Ernest Barry
- Successor: Ernest Barry & Darcy Hadfield
- Relatives: Jack Arnst (brother)

Richard Arnst or Dick Arnst (28 November 1883 – 7 December 1953), born Jacob Diedrich Arnst, was a New Zealand rower and cyclist. He won the Single Sculls World Championship six times during the early part of the 20th century.

== Early life ==
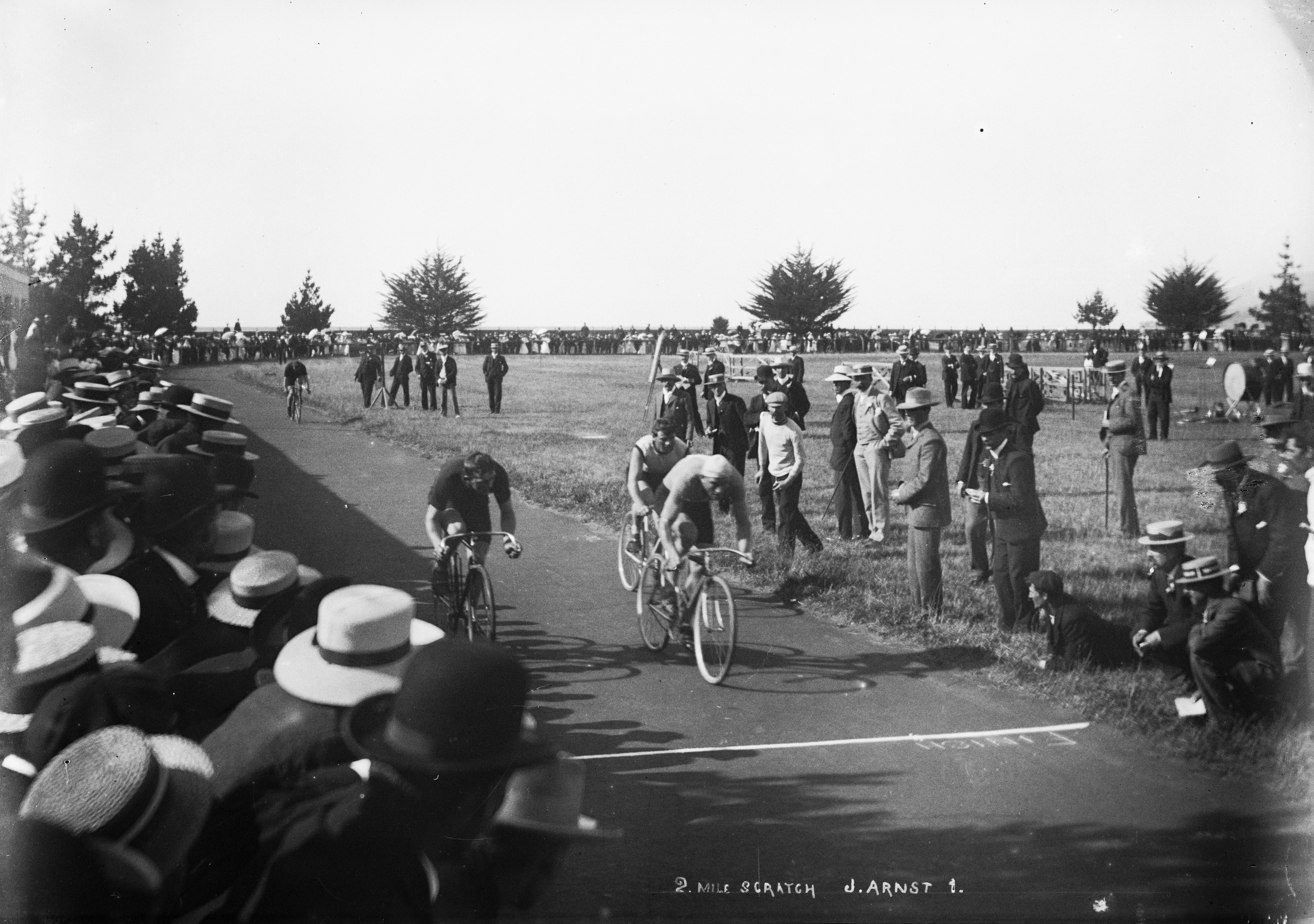
Richard Arnst leading a group of cyclists to the finish line in a two-mile scratch race

Richard Arnst was the eighth of thirteen children born to Hermann and Catharina Arnst. The family lived at Tai Tapu near Christchurch. He, and his brothers Jack, Herman and Bill (William), became champion cyclists both on the road and on the track. Richard and Jack were placed fourth and third respectively in the 1903 Timaru to Christchurch road race which was over a distance of 112 miles (180 km). Jack subsequently won, in record time, the 1903 road race between Warrnambool and Melbourne over a distance of 165 miles (266 km). Some of the credit of this win was due to Arnst's unselfish pacing of his brother. Richard gained 5th place in this race in the second fastest time, that was inside the previous best time. The brothers returned to Australia in 1904 with Richard finishing in 10th and Jack well back in 25th. In 1905 Jack could only manage 76th with Richard in 77th.

On the brothers second trip to Australia in 1904 they raced in the Goulburn to Sydney Classic with Jack finishing 2nd and setting the fastest time, and Richard finishing 12th. Jack again set the fastest time in 1905, finishing 15th while Richard suffered with cramps.

Richard Arnst culminated his cycling career by winning the Sydney Thousand in March 1906. The Sydney Thousand was a track race which carried a total prize purse of £1000 and thus was the richest track race in the world at that time. Only the very top cyclists were in the final held in Sydney.

== Sculling world champion ==
After this Richard Arnst took up sculling; a sport in which he had no previous experience. He was tutored in Australia by experts and after six months or so started winning some races. On the strength of these he challenged various leading Australian scullers for a match race but most were rejected on the grounds that he was too inexperienced. However, one was accepted by Harry Pearce, for a stake of £100 a side. The race was won by Arnst who subsequently challenged fellow New Zealander William Webb (rower) for the professional Single Sculls World Championship title. Webb had won the title in Sydney in 1907, and held off one challenge in New Zealand. These races were normally over a distance of about three and a quarter miles. Webb accepted Arnst's challenge with the stake at £500 a side. The sum of £500 would be the amount of money earned over several years by a working man at the time. The match was held on the Whanganui River (New Zealand) on 15 December 1908 and Arnst won by eight or ten lengths. He had achieved the distinction of becoming World Champion after only a couple of years or so in the sport.

== Subsequent matches ==
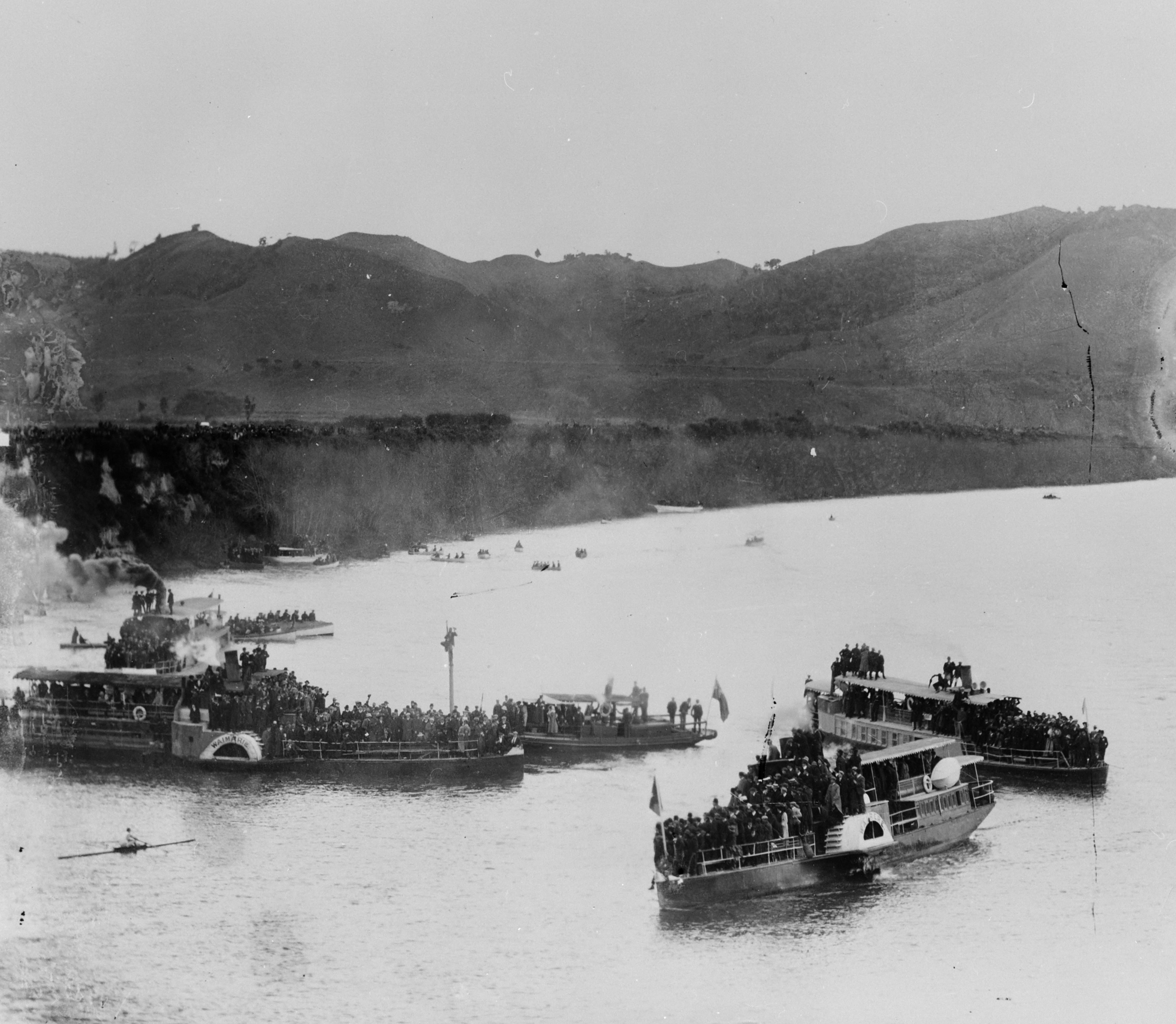
Webb vs Arnst sculling race, Whanganui River

A rematch between Arnst and Webb was arranged for 22 June 1909 on the same course. A fast time of 18m.15s was recorded by Arnst who again won, this time by two to three lengths.

Arnst was then challenged for the title by George Whelch of Akaroa, a town near Christchurch. This race was held on Akaroa Harbour on 4 April 1910 and the stake agreed to was £300 a side. The result was never in doubt; Arnst crossing the line several lengths in front of the challenger.

The next challenge came from Ernest Barry, the Champion of England. Barry wanted Arnst to travel to England for the match which he was willing to do provided certain expenses were met. (Normally a challenger would travel to where the Champion lived.) Barry was unable to arrange the expenses but then the British South Africa Company offered to stage the match in Northern Rhodesia. They believed the match would promote the company and the country. Stakes and expenses were guaranteed by the company and the match was arranged to be run on the Zambezi River on 18 August 1910. Arnst's brother went ahead of them on the river to shoot the crocodiles. The heat and the altitude affected both scullers but Arnst was the better of the two and he crossed the line in front of Barry to retain his title.

Richard Arnst was by now often known as 'Dick' and the next challenge for his crown came from Harry Pearce, the Australian Champion. The match was to be raced on the Parramatta River (Sydney) on 29 July 1911 and the stake was again for £500 a side. Professional sculling was immensely popular and it was estimated that one hundred thousand people turned out to see this match. During the race Arnst nearly fouled his opponent, which would have cost him the game, but he managed to save himself and went on to win.

== Championship loss ==
Ernest Barry wanted another tilt at the title and challenged Arnst to a race to be held on the Thames (England). Strangely, the date agreed to was 29 July 1912, exactly a year after the previous race. Arnst travelled to England to scull the race which was over a distance of about four and a quarter miles on the Championship Course. This time it was Barry who crossed the line in first place.

== Later events ==
Arnst next raced Jim Paddon for the Championship of Australia. The stake was £200 a side and the race was held on the Parramatta course on 1 November 1913. Paddon won and subsequently went on to win the World's Championship after the War.

Barry held off three challenges before the First World War which put all title matches on hold. After the War, Barry lost the title on the Thames to Alf Felton of Australia. A rematch was arranged and Barry travelled to Sydney, Australia to meet Felton with the result that Barry again became World Champion on 31 August 1920.

== Champion again ==
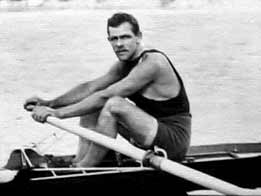
Arnst, c. 1921

Before the race, Dick Arnst had issued a newspaper challenge to the winner of the Felton/Barry match. Barry returned to England and retired from the sport, so Arnst claimed the title by forfeiture. There was no controlling body responsible for the title (nor for many other professional titles) so the claim by Arnst stood. A number of world titles and or claims to them were only generally recognised as being valid when they were accepted by various sporting newspapers, and by implication, the general public.

== Final races ==
Dick Arnst wanted to defend his otherwise empty title and accepted a challenge from New Zealander Pat Hannan. This race was sculled on the Wairau River, near Blenheim, New Zealand, on 11 June 1921 with the result confirming Arnst as World Champion for the sixth time. His final race for the world title took place on the Whanganui River on 5 January 1922. The challenger was Darcy Hadfield, another New Zealander, who had been an Olympic rower and bronze medal winner, and who won the match in a fairly convincing manner. Hadfield subsequently lost the title to Australian Jim Paddon. In April 1922 Arnst and Paddon agreed to row for the title but the race never eventuated. In 1924 Arnst challenged Hannan for the Australasian title. The race for the Australasian title was, unusually, held on the Waikato River on 26 October over a course of three and a quarter miles. Hannan got the lead at the start and maintained it throughout. Arnst broke part of his right scull on a piece of driftwood near the start but he later said that it had made no difference to the result of the race. Hannan won by over twenty lengths.

== Life after sculling ==
Arnst had always been a good shot and after retiring from sculling he became active in shooting and won the following New Zealand Gun Clubs' Championships; 1926 Live Pigeons, 1928 Live Pigeons, 1930 Sparrows, and 1932 Clay Birds. In 1934 Arnst bought a farm south of Timaru running sheep and cattle, and growing crops, in partnership with his brother Henry. Richard Arnst died in 1953. Two years later a Christchurch street, Arnst Place, was named after him. The Arnst River in the Nelson Lakes National Park is also named after him. In 1995 Arnst was inducted into the New Zealand Sports Hall of Fame.

Arnst was a man who had been held in high esteem by his peers and was a fine, well liked, and honourable sportsman.
