= Ernest Barry (rower) =

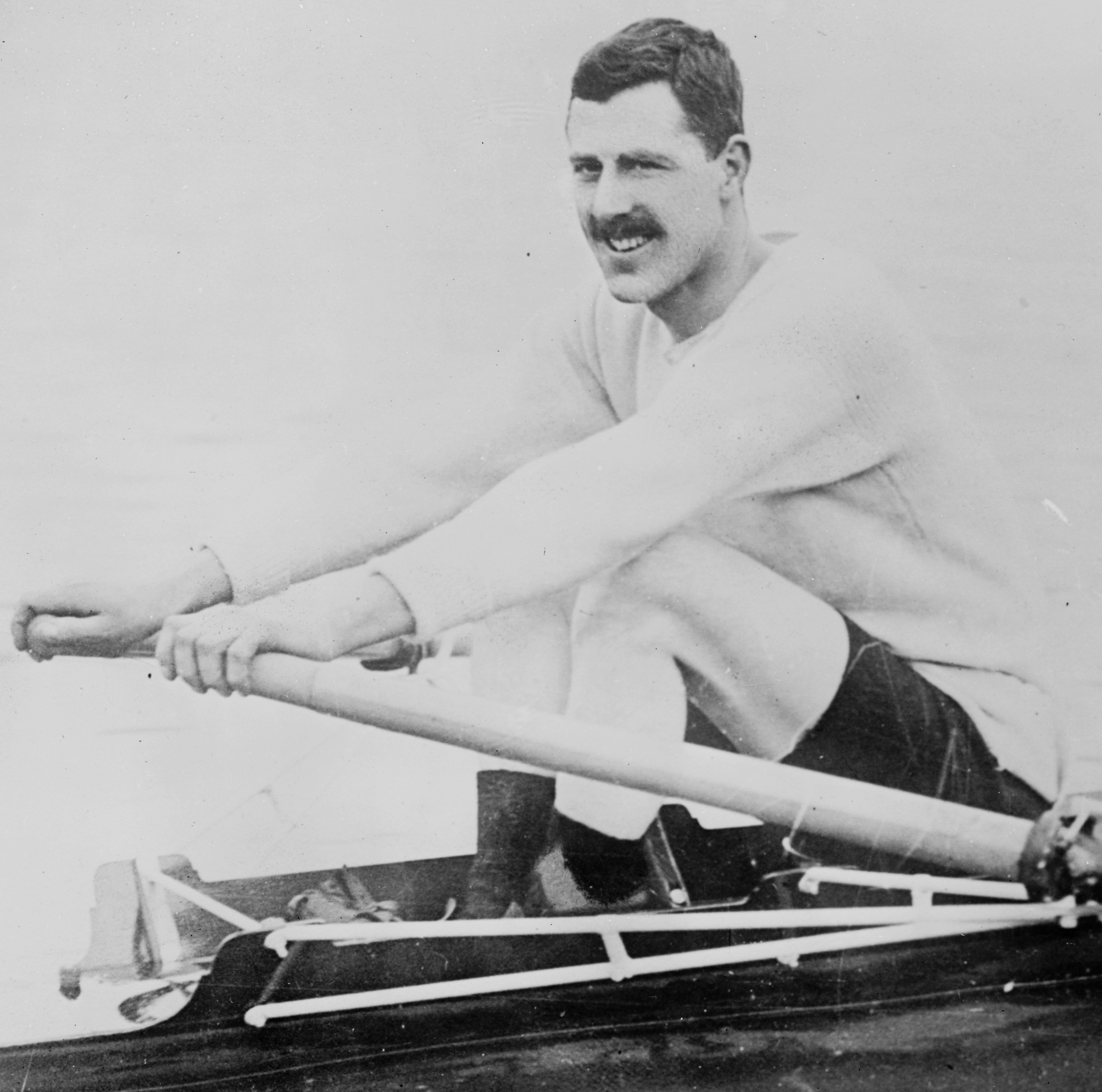
- Born: 1882; England
- Died: 1968 (aged 85–86); England
- Title: World Champion sculler
- Term: 1912–1919, 1920
- Predecessor: Richard Arnst, Alf Felton
- Successor: Alf Felton, Richard Arnst

Ernest James Barry (1882 – July 1968) was a British rower and Thames Waterman, five times Sculling World Champion during the early part of the 20th century and winner of the Doggett's Coat and Badge Race in 1903.

== Sculling career ==
Ernest Barry was brought almost straight from novice to race for the English Sculling Championship in 1908 against George Towns, who had already won the world championship four times and the English Championship twice. That day, Barry, as well as beating Towns, set up a record over the course which lasted for many years. His time was 21m.12.5s.

In August 1910 he competed for the World Professional sculling championship for the first time. Barry wanted Richard Arnst, the existing champion, to travel to England for the match, which he was willing to do provided certain expenses were met. (Normally a challenger would travel to where the champion lived.) Barry was unable to arrange the expenses, but then the British South Africa Company offered to stage the match in Northern Rhodesia. They believed the match would promote the company and the country. Stakes and expenses were guaranteed by the company, and the match was arranged to be run on the Zambezi River on 18 August 1910. The 3.25-mile race above the Victoria Falls was what may have been the first serious high-altitude competition. The heat and the altitude affected both scullers, but Arnst was the better of the two, and he crossed the line in front of Barry to retain his title.

== World Champion ==
In July 1912 Barry won against Arnst the World Championship on the Thames and retained the title for five years. This was the first time an Englishman had held the title since 1876, and Barry's victory was hailed as "Refutation of charge of England's athletic decadence." In reality Barry regained the championship by adopting the lifestyle of his nearest foreign competitors, including accepting £2000 of sponsorship from the Daily Mail in the form of travelling expenses.

In October 1912 Barry retained his Title by defeating Edward Durnan, of Canada, on the Thames course. The following July (1913) he also defeated Harry Pearce of Australia, again on the Thames course. He held off one further challenge by beating Jim Paddon of Australia in September 1914. No matches were held during World War I.

Barry lost the World title to Australian Alf Felton on the Thames course in October 1919. Both men had been servicemen in the first World War, and Felton was still in Europe at the time of the challenge, so he did not need to travel from Australia. Felton offered Barry a return match, which was to be held in Sydney. During the race in August 1920, Felton led for the first half and then Barry fouled his opponent. Felton stopped rowing, believing he had won on the foul, but the umpire, Bill Beach ordered the men to continue rather than making a ruling. It was likely he believed the foul was accidental and did not make a difference to the race. Felton did not scull on, but Barry did, and he crossed the line ahead and thus regained the World Title. The umpire's decision was final. This race was on the Parramatta River in Sydney, Australia. Barry returned to England and finally lost the title to Richard Arnst when he (Barry) forfeited a challenge by Arnst because three months passed without Barry accepting the challenge. For further details of his championship races see World Professional sculling championship.

In October 1920 The New York Times reported:

"Ernest Barry, holder of the professional sculling Championship of the World as a result of his recent victory over Felton in Australia, finds that he will be unable to do the training required to defend his title. He hopes that his nephew Bert Barry, who is 18 years of age and six feet in height, will become defender of the title in his stead"

Ultimately his nephew Bert did go on to become Champion of the World, but not for another seven years.

== A Royal Waterman ==
Barry was made a Royal Waterman in 1913. He saw service in the army in the First War. For two or three years in the early 1920s he was landlord of the Fox Inn in Church Street Twickenham, but had given that up by 1922, moving to No.5 Bonser Road with his wife Lottie.

The Barrys had five children. Lottie was by birth a Hammerton, a member of the large family that lived in no25 The Embankment, now the home of The Twickenham Museum. One of Lottie's cousins was Walter Hammerton, waterman and ferryman who was the victor in the Earl of Dysart vs Hammerton case of 1913–15.

== Later life ==
After retiring from competitive sculling Ernest Barry turned to coaching. He was appointed the Royal Barge Master to King George VI, and later to Queen Elizabeth II until he retired from the position in 1952 because of ill health.

In 1934 – 1938 he coached at Danske Studenters Roklub in Copenhagen creating great progress in that club culminating with two bronze medals at the European Championships in 1938. In 1953 he was invited to coach Cork Boat Club in Ireland. While not all agreed with his style and method, there was no doubt that he considerably improved the standard of rowing in the club, and the crowning point was the success in the Maiden VIII Championships in Drogheda in 1957.

Barry lived to see the end of professional sculling but was forced to sell all but two of his trophies to support himself and his daughter Thelma, who contracted poliomyelitis.

He spent the rest of his life at Bonser Road, off the lower end of Cross Deep in Twickenham, dying in July 1968 aged about 86.
