= List of Geordie songwriters =

This is a list of songwriters in the Geordie dialect of English, spoken in Tyneside.

== Poets and songwriters ==
=== Pre-20th century ===
Pre-20th century poets and songwriters
| Name | Works | Biography |
|---|---|---|
| J. Aldridge Jnr of Newcastle | According to John Bell in his Rhymes of Northern Bards, Aldridge set "Nanny of the Tyne" to music | Composer |
| James Anderson | | |
| Robert Anderson | | |
| Thomas “Tommy” Armstrong | | |
| William “Willie” Armstrong | | |
| J. B. | Writer of "The Misfortunes of Roger and His Wife" which appears on page 172 of Fordyce's The Tyne Songster and coincidentally page 172 of John Marshall's Collection of Songs, Comic, Satirical. | An alias. Otherwise very little information is available. |
| W. B. of Gateshead | The writer of "The Bluebell of Gateshead" which appears on page 61 of John Bell's Rhymes of Northern Bards. | An alias. Otherwise nothing much known. |
| Joshua L. Bagnall | | |
| Bailey | | Possibly used the alias J. N. (see below). |
| C. W. Barnes | Songwriter/poet and publisher/printer. | |
| Samuel Barras | He wrote an Epitaph on William Bell, late a resident of Gateshead Fell, according to John Bell in his Rhymes of Northern Bards | Otherwise very little information is available. |
| Alexander Barrass | | |
| George Charleton Barron | | |
| Thomas Bedingfeld | | |
| Michael Benson | | |
| John Roland Bibby | | |
| Thomas Binney | | |
| Black | | Geordy Black - character played by and see Rowland Harrison. |
| Ralph Blackett | | |
| Blind Willy | | The nickname of and see William Purvis. |
| Bobby Cure (The) | | One of the stage names of/characters played by and see George "Geordie" Ridley |
| Bothwell | Writer of "Stanzas - Addressed to Northumbria" and dated "January 2nd 1807" published on page 171 of John Bell's Rhymes of Northern Bards. | Otherwise very little information available. |
| Richard Brathwaite of Burnishead | | |
| William Brockie | | Songwriter/poet and publisher/printer |
| D.C. | Writer of "The Skipper's Voyage to the Museum" which appears on page 524 of France's Songs of the Bards of the Tyne (see index on page 15) | An alias. Otherwise nothing much known. |
| J.C. | Writer of "Song - by J.C. and dated 5 July 1810" which appears on page 236 of John Bell's Rhymes of Northern Bards. | An alias. Otherwise nothing much known. |
| George Cameron | | |
| John Carr | | |
| William Carstairs | | Schoolmaster/songwriter/poet who had a famous wager with Thomas Whittle |
| Charles Ernest Catcheside-Warrington | | |
| Cat Gut/Catgut Jim | | A Character played by and see Edward Corvan. |
| James Catnach | | Songwriter/poet and publisher/printer |
| R. Charlton | | |
| William Andrew Chatto | | Used the pseudonym of Stephen Oliver (Jr) |
| Edward Chicken | | |
| Clarinda | Writer of "The Patriot Volunteers (or Loyalty Display'd)" which appears on page 310 of John Bell's Rhymes of Northern Bards. | An alias. Otherwise nothing much known. |
| John C. Clemintson of Jarror | Wrote "The Black leggin'-pollis" which won third prize in Chater's competition of 1872, and appeared on page 92 of John W. Chater's Canny Newcassel Diary and Remembrancer for 1872. | Songwriter/poet |
| John Luke Clennell | According to Thomas Allan on page 176 & 7 of his Illustrated Edition of Tyneside Songs and Readings, Clennell wrote lines on Robert Gilchrist's death. | A songwriter/poet. |
| James Thomas Clephan | | |
| Thomas Clerke | | |
| Edward Corvan | | |
| James Cosgrove | | Used stage name of J C Scatter. |
| John Craggs | | |
| Marshall Cresswell | | |
| B Crow | | |
| John Cunningham | | |
| Bobby Cure (The) | | One of the stage names of/characters played by and see George "Geordie" Ridley |
| D --- | Writer of several songs including: "Sweet Tibbie Dunbar" - page 443 France's Songs of the Bards of the Tyne; "Young Mary, Queen of Hearts" - page 451 in France's book; "My Canny Wife" - page 465 in France's book; "Willy Wier" - page 303 in France's book; "Canny Wife's reply" - page 505 in France's book; "The Half-Drowned Skipper" - page 153 Thomas Allan's Illustrated Edition of Tyneside Songs and Readings - a comment adds that it "first appeared (signed D.) in the Tyneside Minstrel, 1824". The song appears in many other books, but without any accreditation of authorship. | An alias. Otherwise nothing much known. |
| James Davidson | | |
| T. F. Davidson | Writer of "My home in early years", a song which appeared on page 421 of France's Songs of the Bards of the Tyne, and of which, the author Joseph Philip Robson, wrote a glowing comment. The work is signed simply "Quayside, Newcastle", but the index attributes the work to T. F. Davidson | A songwriter/poet. |
| A. J. W. Dawson | | |
| William Henderson Dawson | | |
| John Jack Dent | Wrote "Lines to Joe Wilson", on seeing Joe Wilson's portrait in Mr. France's window. The work was printed on page 283 of Thomas Allan's Illustrated Edition of Tyneside Songs and Readings, together with a short bio of his later life. He also published a volume of his own songs in or around 1870. | A songwriter/poet. |
| Thomas Doubleday | | |
| Ralph Dowey | | |
| Matthew Dryden | | |
| William Dunbar | | |
| William Elderton | | |
| Edward Elliott | | |
| Robert Elliott of Choppington | | |
| Robert Emery | | |
| A. F. of Lead Gate | | See A. Frazer. |
| Duncan Frasier | | A bard from c.1270 AD. |
| A. Frazer | Writer of "Wylam Geordy (signed A. F. of Leadgate) and "The New Keviling* Monday" (signed A. Frazer), no doubt, according to Allen, the same person; both appear on page 170 of Thomas Allan's Illustrated Edition of Tyneside Songs and Readings. | An alias. Otherwise nothing much known. |
| P. G. | | See P. Galloway. |
| P. Galloway | Wrote: "The praise of Corinth and the local Corinthians" given on 29 August 1827, "A Lament on the death of Alexander Donkin, a young man of twenty-four, died on February 12th, 1825" and; "To the Memory of Richard Young, who died November 4th, 1831".; All these appear on pages 230 to 232 in Thomas Allan's Illustrated Edition of Tyneside Songs and Readings. They were originally signed with initials "P.G.". | Also uses alias P. G. A songwriter/poet who appeared to be a member of the local Corinthian Society (a group of businessmen who regularly met in the local ale-houses to talk business and friendship). Otherwise little information available. |
| Isaac Garner | Wrote "Epitaph on John Simpson, Hamsterley, Woolcomber", which appears on page 292 of John Bell's Rhymes of Northern Bards. | A songwriter/poet. Otherwise very little information available. |
| Geddes | Wrote "Ikeybo - or The Wonder of Guano", which appears on page 314 of France's Songs of the Bards of the Tyne. The work is sung to the tune of Barbara Bell and is ascribed to Geddes in the index. | A songwriter/poet. Otherwise little information is available. |
| Geordie | Wrote "Shipley's Drop frae the Cloods " which appears on page 575 of Thomas Allan's Illustrated Edition of Tyneside Songs and Readings. The song was originally printed in the Shields Gazette. | Pseudonym, otherwise nothing much known. |
| Geordy Black | | Character played by and see Rowland Harrison. |
| John Gibson | | |
| Robert Gilchrist | | |
| John Brodie Gilroy | | |
| John Woodcock Graves | | |
| William Greig | | |
| George Guthrie | | |
| H. F. H. | Wrote and sang the song "A Song at the opening of Jarrow Colliery (Opened on 26 Sept 1803)" which appears on page 304 of John Bell's Rhymes of Northern Bards. | An alias, otherwise nothing much known. |
| D.H. (possibly D. Hobkirk) | | See David Hobkirk. |
| Harry Haldane | | Pseudonym of Richard Oliver Heslop. |
| John Harbottle | | |
| Rowland Harrison | | |
| M Harvey | Wrote "Lines on the Death of John, Lord Delaval", which appears on page 100 of John Bell's Rhymes of Northern Bards. | A songwriter/poet. Very little else is known of him or his works. |
| Thomas Haswell | | Music composer, |
| Havadab of Shieldfield | Wrote "Gone" and "Ma Singin' Freend" which appear on page 573 of Thomas Allan's Illustrated Edition of Tyneside Songs and Readings. Both songs had appeared previously in the Weekly Chronicle. | An alias, otherwise nothing much known. |
| Alexander Hay | | |
| Richard Oliver Heslop | | |
| David Hobkirk | | |
| Phill “Primrose” Hodgson | | |
| James Horsley | | |
| Thomas Houston | | |
| J. H. | | See John Howard |
| John Howard | A short item can be found on page 35 of Thomas Allan's Illustrated Edition of Tyneside Songs and Readings. | Also used J. H. A songwriter/poet, he had a public argument in the press with Thomas Thompson (writing anonymously) about plagiarism and in which Howard (using the initials "J.H.") confessed to "borrowing a line". Little else is known of him or his works. |
| J. Ingo | | |
| Henry Jackson | Commemorated "The Free Education Act" (of 1891) in a song on page 576 of Thomas Allan's Illustrated Edition of Tyneside Songs and Readings. | A songwriter/poet, little else is known of him or of any of his works. |
| J Jackson | Wrote "(He's such a) Nice Old Gill", quite a long song, which appears on page 402 of France's Songs of the Bards of the Tyne. The name is given as "J. Jackson" in the index. | A songwriter/poet, otherwise little information available. |
| T. Jackson | | |
| Matthew C. James of Walker | | |
| Johnny Luik up | | One of the stage names of/characters played by George "Geordie" Ridley. |
| Ben Jonson | He may have written "A Riddle of St Nicholas'" according to the comment on page 329 of Thomas Allan's Illustrated Edition of Tyneside Songs and Readings. | |
| K. | Writer of "Picking of lillies the other day, I saw a ship sailing on the main (actual title unknown)" which appears on page 65 of (Sir) Cuthbert Sharpe's Bishoprick Garland. The old (lost) song was dictated from memory to the author by a Mr. George Wood, Bridge Street, Bishopwearmouth. | An alias. |
| T. Kennedy | | |
| Thomas Kerr | | |
| George Knight, Shoemaker | Wrote the following: “The Hare-Skin” sung to the tune of “Have you heard of a frolicsome ditty” which appears on page 258 of John Bell's Rhymes of Northern Bards and on page 26 of Joseph Ritson's Bishopric Garland or Durham Minstrel; “Limbo” sung to the tune of “On a time I was great, now little I'm grown” which appears on page 261 of John Bell's book and on page 30 of Joseph Ritson's book; “The Launching of the Strickland“ sung to the tune of “Robin Hood and the Tanner” which appears on page 33 of Joseph Ritson's book. | A songwriter/poet who in both Bell's and Ritson's books is described as "a shoemaker", but no other details are given. |
| L --- of East Rainton | Writer of "A New Song on the Opening of Jarrow Colliery" which according to the index is called "Of Temple and King, my friends, let us sing" and written for the Opening of Jarrow Colliery 1803 (and not to be confused by the song of a similar name by "H. F. H."), appears on page 321 of John Bell's Rhymes of Northern Bards. | An alias, otherwise nothing much known. |
| J. L. | Writer of "The Tyne" (first line - O lovely Tyne, Thy beauty's seen) appears on page 322 of John Bell's Rhymes of Northern Bards. | An alias. |
| Robert Lambe (or Lamb) | Wrote An exact and circumstantial history of the Battle of Flodden, in verse: written about the time of Queen Elizabeth 1774 by Robert Lambe; The history of Chess, together with short plain instructions, by which any one may easily play at it without the help of a teacher; The Laidley Worm of Spindleston Heugh (ballad) | Vicar of Norham, poet and author. |
| John Leonard | | |
| Clarence M. Leumane | | |
| David Ross Lietch | | |
| Johnny Luik up - One of the stage names of/characters played by and see George "Geordie" Ridley | | |
| David Mallet | | |
| Thomas Marshall | | |
| Joseph McGill | Writer of several songs including: "In memory of Joseph Philip Robson" - page 347 in Thomas Allan's Illustrated Edition of Tyneside Songs and Readings; "Young Mary, Queen of Hearts", Fishwife's dilemma. As sung by Rowley Harrison at the New Tyne Concert, in the pantomime of 'Cyprus' - page 14 in John W Chater's Chater's Annual for 1879. | Otherwise nothing much known. |
| John McLellan | | |
| William Mitford | | |
| T. Moor | | |
| James Morrison | | |
| John Morrison | | |
| J. N. | The writer of "Newcastle Market" which appears in volume 7/page 13 of John Ross's Songs of the Tyne and "The Skipper's Fright" which appears on page 322 of Fordyce's The Tyne Songster. | May be the pseudonym of Bailey (according to the index in Fordyce's book. Otherwise nothing much known. |
| Harry Nelson | | Singer/songwriter/poet |
| Robert Nunn | | |
| — Ogle, Schoolmaster of Gateshead | Wrote “Lines on John Thompson, who was hanged on Newcastle Town Moor, for Horse Stealing, about 20 Years ago” and “The Pitman” both appear on page 242 of John Bell's Rhymes of Northern Bards. | A songwriter/poet. Otherwise very little information is available. It is assumed that this is not the Wallis Ogle who assisted James Wilson in finding work, nor the Wallis Ogle of Causey Park House. |
| Stephen Oliver (Jr) | | Pseudonym used by William Andrew Chatto. |
| Thomas Oliver | | |
| William Oliver | | |
| John Peacock | | |
| George Pickering, late of Newcastle | | |
| Cecil Pitt | | |
| Jasper Potts | Wrote "The Loyal Hexham Volunteers" which appears on page 228 of John Bell's Rhymes of Northern Bards. | A songwriter/poet. Otherwise very little information is available. |
| S. E. Preston | Wrote "The Banks of the North" which appears on page 475 of France's Songs of the Bards of the Tyne. | A songwriter/poet, Otherwise very little information is available. |
| Charles Purvis | | |
| William Purvis (Blind Willie) | | |
| Benjamin Pye (sometimes Poye) L.L.D. | | Archdeacon of Durham |
| T R | Wrote "An Elegy to the Memory of the Right Honourable Lord Ravensworth" to be sung to the tune of "Have you heard of a frolicsome ditty" which appears on page 99 of John Bell's Rhymes of Northern Bards. | A songwriter/poet. Otherwise very little information available. |
| James Rewcastle | | |
| William Richardson | | |
| George Ridley | | |
| Henry Robson | | |
| Jack Robson | | |
| James Robson | | |
| Joseph Philip Robson | | |
| Rosalinda | Writer of "Pandon Dene" which appears on page 16 of Thomas Allan's Illustrated Edition of Tyneside Songs and Readings. The index in France's Songs of the Bards of the Tyne gives the writer as Robert Gilchrist, but the song appears to pre-date him. | An alias. Otherwise nothing much known. |
| Metcalfe Ross | | |
| Robert Roxby | | |
| Bernard Rumney of Rothbury | | |
| J. S. | Writer of "Cull, Alias Silly Billy of Newcastle upon Tyne" which appears on page 312 of John Bell's Rhymes of Northern Bards. | An alias. At the time there were three well known songwriters in Newcastle, all (occasionally) using the pseudonym "J.S.". They were John Selkirk - J S of Gateshead, John Kelday Smith and James Stawpert, but to date, the song has not been traced to any of these. |
| J. C. Scatter | | Stage name of James Cosgrove. |
| John Selkirk - J. S. of Gateshead | | |
| Richard Sheale (Elizabethan poet) | | |
| John “Jack” Shield | | |
| William Shield | | |
| Joseph Skipsey | | Pitman poet |
| John Kelday Smith | | |
| Songster | Writer of "Shields Races" which appears on page 492 of France's Songs of the Bards of the Tyne (see page 14 of the index). | An alias. |
| Spectator at Monkseaton Races - July 1, 1812 | Writer of "Monkseaton Races - July 1st 1812, by a spectator" which appears on page 307 of John Bell's Rhymes of Northern Bards. | An alias. |
| James Stawpert | | |
| Stephen Oliver (Jr) | | Pseudonym used by William Andrew Chatto. |
| John Atlantic Stephenson | | |
| William Stephenson (junior) | | |
| William Stephenson (senior) | | |
| John Stobbs | | |
| J Sutherland | Wrote the song "The Gutta Percha Tallygrip" sung to the tune of "Barbara Bell", and which appears on page 16 of Walker's Songs of the Tyne. There is a brief comment stating that the song was written "On the erection of a Gutta-percha tube for the purpose of conveying intelligence from Mr Taylor's Gutta Percha establishment in The Close to his workshops up the Castle Garth Stairs" (both in Newcastle. | Songwriter/poet. |
| R. P. Sutherland | | J. P. Sutherland was the same person, with the initials J. P. used in error |
| William Sutton | | |
| Matthew Tate | | |
| John Taylor | | |
| Thomas Thompson | | |
| W Thompson | Wrote “The Stars O' Hartlepool” during his stay in Hartlepool. It tells of some of the “stars”, i.e. the people and places, many now gone, but well known at the time of writing. The song appears on page 356 of France’s Songs of the Bards of the Tyne published in 1850, followed by a very short bio on page 238. (It does however, in the earlier index, erroneously ascribe the song to J P Robson, the editor of the book). | Described as a very talented comedian. |
| Thomas Train - of Gateshead | Thomas Allan in his Illustrated Edition of Tyneside Songs and Readings quotes John Bell as saying that the song Bob Cranky's Adieu "was set to music by Thomas Train, of Gateshead, and sung by him at many public dinners in Newcastle and Gateshead. He humoured this song much, and it became a great favourite": The song "Bob Cranky's Adieu" by John Shield and sung to the tune of "The Soldiers Adieu" appears on page 74 of Thomas Allan's Illustrated Edition of Tyneside Songs and Readings and also in John Bell's Rhymes of Northern Bards, Fordyce's The Tyne Songster, France's Songs of the Bards of the Tyne, John Ross' Songs of the Tyne, and John Marshall's Collection of Songs, Comic, Satirical together with his Newcastle Songster | Composer. |
| Norman Turnbull | | |
| R. Usher | | |
| T. R. Valentine of Gateshead | Wrote "The Politicians" published on page 71 of Marshall's Collection of Songs, Comic, Satirical 1827 and also "Charley's Return from the Ocean" sung to the tune of "I'm oftentimes Drunk, and Seldom Sober" and published on page 510 of France's Songs of the Bards of the Tyne - 1850 | |
| John Vint, a bookseller and writer | Wrote "The Cottager's Daughter" published on page 3 of Davison's The Northumbrian Minstrel, 1811 and also "Burradon Ghost" mentioned on page 4 of Charles Hindley's History of the Catnach Press, 1886. | |
| E. W. | Writer of "Battle of Humbledown Hill" (a battle fought 14 September 1402) which appears on page 152 of John Bell's Rhymes of Northern Bards. The poem is signed "By E. W. August 5th, 1791). | An alias. |
| M. W. of North Shields | Writer of "Sunderland Bridge" which appears on page 285 of John Bell's Rhymes of Northern Bards and page 72 of (Sir) Cuthbert Sharpe's The Bishoprick Garland which also includes a brief bio. The song is not about the village of Sunderland Bridge, County Durham, but about Wearmouth Bridge, the iron bridge over the River Wear at Sunderland, and sponsored by the M.P. Rowland Burdon. | An alias used. |
| William Watson | | |
| James Weams | | |
| J. M. Wedderburn of Newcastle | | |
| Thomas Whittle | | |
| R. J. Wilkinson | | |
| James Wilson | | |
| Joe Wilson | | |
| Thomas Wilson | | |

=== 20th century and forward ===
- Robert Allen (poet)
- Eric Boswell — songwriter/poet
- Henry Brewis — poet, writer, cartoonist, illustrator
- Bill Griffiths (poet)

== Antiquarians, historians, authors, mining engineers, scientists and similar ==
- John Balmbra — Entrepreneur, owner of the famous Music Hall.
- Sir David Brewster — Subject of a song and a scientist/engineer and inventor of the Kaleidoscope c. 1820. The song "The Pitman's Skellyscope" written by William Mitford appears in a great many chapbooks, possibly due to its novelty value, including on page 147 of Thomas Allan's Illustrated Edition of Tyneside Songs and Readings.
- John Collingwood Bruce — Author and editor; he and John Stokoe co-edited "Northumbrian Minstrelsy".
- Mr W. Cail — An author/historian/antiquarian who collected manuscripts, particularly relating to the songs and poems of Edward Chicken. He is mentioned on page 5 of Thomas Allan's Illustrated Edition of Tyneside Songs and Readings. There was a W. Cail practising as a solicitor in Newcastle around that time, but it is not known if they were one and the same.
- Edward Charlton — Writer and historian.
- Dr Clark — Historian/antiquarian whose brief comment on John Shield's work is noted on page 65 of Thomas Allan's Illustrated Edition of Tyneside Songs and Readings.
- James Thomas Clephan — Journalist and songwriter/poet.
- David Dippie Dixon — A historian who added much to the knowledge of the area and its language.
- Scott Dobson — A 20th-century writer of prose and humorous books, mainly in broad Geordie dialect.
- John Woodham Dunn — An Anglican vicar and author who added much to the knowledge of the area and its language.
- Dennis Embleton — Medical doctor, surgeon, naturalist, historian and poet.
- George Clementson Greenwell — A mining engineer, whose writings defined many of the words and terms used in mining.
- Richard Oliver Heslop — Historian/lexicologist/songwriter/poet, etc.
- Eneas Mackenzie — A historian who added much to the knowledge of the area and its language.
- Sir Walter Scott — He may have transcribed "Bewick and the Graeme'" according to the comment on page 25 of Stokoe and Bruce's Northumbrian Minstrelsy.
- James Shotton — Artist.
- Robert Surtees — A historian who added much to the knowledge of the area and its language.
- Robert Wilson — A physician, whose published papers on mining added to the area's history.

== See also ==
- Geordie dialect words
- Allan's Illustrated Edition of Tyneside Songs and Readings
- Fordyce’s Tyne Songster
- France's Songs of the Bards of the Tyne - 1850
- The Bishoprick Garland (1834, by Sharp)
- Rhymes of Northern Bards
- Marshall's Collection of Songs, Comic, Satirical 1827
- The Songs of the Tyne by Ross
- The Songs of the Tyne by Walker
- Marshall's A Collection of Original Local Songs
