= France's Songs of the Bards of the Tyne - 1850 =

Book by Joseph Philip Robson

Songs of the Bards of the Tyne
- Author: Joseph Philip Robson (editor)
- Language: English (Geordie dialect)
- Genre: chapbook
- Publisher: P. France & Co.
- Publication date: 1850
- Publication place: United Kingdom
- Media type: Print
- Pages: approx. 560 pages

Songs of the Bards of the Tyne is a chapbook style songbook, giving the lyrics of local, now historical songs, with a few bits of other information. It was edited by Joseph Philip Robson and published by P. France & Co. in 1850.

== Details ==
Songs of the Bards of the Tyne (full title – “France's Songs of the Bards of the Tyne; A choice selection of original songs, chiefly in the Newcastle Dialect. With a glossary of 800 words. Edited by J. P. Robson, Published by P France & Co., No 8 Side, Newcastle upon Tyne – 1849) is a Chapbook style book of Geordie folk songs consisting of approximately 270 song lyrics on over 560 pages, published in 1850.

It is, as the title suggests, a collection of songs which would have been popular, or topical, at the date of publication. There is very little in the way of biographies of any of the writers or histories of the events.

== Contents ==
Page	Title	Songwriter	Tune	Comments	Notes	Ref
iv	Publisher's Preface					
v	Editor's comments					
8	Index					
17	Wonderful Tallygrip – (The)	J P Robson	Barbara Bell			
19	short bio	John Balmbra		landlord of Wheat Sheaf Inn		
20	Wonderful Tallygrip – (The)	J P Robson	Barbara Bell	encore verses		
22	Skipper's Wedding – (The)	W Stephenson Senior				
25	Jemmy Joneson’s Whurry – or Gaol and Kitty	T Thompson				
27	Canny Newcastle	T Thompson	Fy, let's off to the bridal			
30	Pitman's Courtship – (The)	William Mitford		author given as W Midford		
32	Cappy – or The Pitman's Dog	William Mitford		author given as W Midford		
35	Polly's Nickstick	J P Robson	X. Y. Z.			
39	Pitman's Skellyscope (The)	William Mitford	Polly Parker, O	author given as W Midford		
41	Bonny Keel Laddie (The)	not given				
42	Mayor of Bordeaux (The) – or Mally 's Mistake	William Mitford	Fy, let's off to the bridal	author given as W Midford		
44	Collier's Rant (The)	not given				
45	New Keel Row (The) – new version	T Thompson				
45	(Weel May) The Keel Row – original version	Traditional				
47	Glister (The)	W Armstrong				
49	Callerforney – A dialogue	J P Robson	Alley Croaker			
51	Gutta Percha	J P Robson	The Campbells Are Coming			
54	Kittlin' Legacy (The) – or the Clawa in the Will	J P Robson	Barbara Bell	this song marked "Copyright"		
54	comment on			The story of the legacy		
56	There's a Grand Time Comin'	J P Robson		according to Ross in "The Songs of the Tyne c1846" author may be R P Sutherland		
57	Harry Clasper	J P Robson	Famous Auld Cappy			
59	Pitman's luck at the races (The)	W Mitford	according to Farne archives to the tune of 'Cameronians Rant'	also indexed as X. Y. Z.		
59	comment on			the pitman's hobby		
62	Newcastle Spaw	Emery	Rory O' More			
62	short bio			about the spring		
64	Fishwives lament (The) – on their removal from the Sandhill to the New Fish Market on 2 Jan 1827	R Emery	Sleeping Maggie			
65	April Gowk (The)	R Gilchrist	Jenny choak'd the bairn			
67	Steam Soup (or Cuckoo Jack's Petition)	Emery	X. Y. Z.			
69	Pitman's Ramble (The)	Emery	The Kebbuckstane Wedding			
71	Swalwell Hopping	J Selkirk	Paddy's Wedding			
74	Mally's Voyage to Callerforney	J P Robson	Hydrophoby			
77	Pitman's Happy Times – (The)	J P Robson	In the days when we went Gypsying			
79	Keelmen of the Tyne (The)	J P Robson	The Orange and the Blue			
81	Militia (The)	J P Robson	The Campbells are Coming			
83	Newcastle Improvements	J P Robson	Oh! 'Tis Love			
85	Oh, Come, My lovely Maid	J P Robson	The Swiss Toy Girl			
86	Little Pee-dee (The)	not given	Pitman's Courtship (The)			
87	Skipper's Visit to the Polytechnic	Emery	X. Y. Z.			
90	Sandgate Pant – or Jane Jemieson's Ghost	Emery	I'd be a butterfly			
92	Blind Willy's Death	Nunn	Jemmy Joneson's Whurry			
93	Skipper's Dream (The)	T Moor				
95	Floatin' Gunstan – (The)	Armstrong		About a "Floating Grindstone"	Fr-Tune3	
96	Newcassel Worthies (The)	Armstrong	We've aye been provided for	actually spelt "Newcastle" in this book		
99	Days and Deeds of Shakspere	J P Robson	The Old English Gentleman			
102	Pitman's Candidate (The)	J P Robson	Jeanette and Jeannot	title actually given as "Pitman" in this book		
103	Song of the Old Tyne Bridge	J P Robson	The Old Kirk-Yard			
105	Maw Wonderful Wife	J P Robson	Barbara Bell			
107	Noodle – (The)	J B Gilroy	Jeanette and Jeannot			
109	Use and abuse (The) – or the Pitman and the preacher	J P Robson	Canny Newcassel			
110	Thumping Luck	W Watson	Gang Nae Mair to Yon Town			
112	Pigeons' Milk – or A Shy at the Quacks	J P Robson	Calder Fair	this song marked "Copyright"		
115	Luckey's Dream	not given	Calder Fair	actually spelt "Lukey's Dream" in this book	A-N1	
117	Cobbler O' Morpeth (The) (Cholera Morbus)	McLellan	Bow Wow	refers to Cholera		
119	Nancy Wilkinson	H Robson	Duncan Davison			
120	Newcassel Props (The)	W Oliver	The Bold Dragoon			
122	Baggy Nanny – or The Pitman's Frolic	R Emery	The Kebbuckstane Wedding			
124	Coal trade (The)	not given	The Keel Row		B S6	
127	Hamlick, Prince of Denton – Part First	J P Robson	Merrily Dance the Quaker's Wife			
129	Canny Aud Sheels	J P Robson	Sprig of Shillalah			
132	By the Waves of the Ocean	J P Robson	The last rose of summer			
132	comment on	J P Robson		from "Wild Blossoms of Poesy"		
133	Palestine Knight	J P Robson	Dunois the young and brave			
134	Keelmen's Reasons for Attending Church (The)	not given	Jemmy Joneson's Whurry			
135	St. Nicholas' Church	R Nunn	Auld Lang Syne			
137	Sandgate Lass on the Ropery Bank (The)	R Nunn	The Skipper's Wedding			
139	Half Drowned Skipper (The)	not given	Chapter of Donkeys			
141	Newcastle Noodles (The)	James Morrison	Canny Newcassel	author given in index as "J Morrison"	A-M2	
142	Billy Oliver's Ramble (between Benwell and Newcastle)	not given				
144	Sandhill Monkey (The)	William Stephenson (junior)	Drops of Brandy	Author given as W Stephenson	A-S4	
146	Hamlick, Prince of Denton – Part Second	J P Robson				
149	Hamlick, Prince of Denton – Part Third	J P Robson				
150	Skipper's Almanac (The)	J P Robson	X. Y. Z.			
153	Devil (The) – or The Nanny Goat	not given	Weel Bred Cappy	shield songster		
155	Beggars' Wedding – (The)	William Stephenson (junior)	Ballinafad		A-S4	
155	comment on			slight amendments by the editor (J P Robson)		
157	Betty Beesley and her Wooden Man	J P Robson	The Bold Dragoon	this song marked "Copyright"		
160	Pitman's return from Calleyforney (The)	Emery	Old Dan Tucker			
161	Parody on the Soldier's Tear	W Greig	The Soldier's Tear			
162	Lass of Wincomblee (The)	not given	Nae Luck About The House			
164	Mechanic's Procession (The) (or A Trip To South Shields)	Emery	The Bold Dragoon			
166	Valentine's Day	not given	Newcastle Fair	according to Farne Archives J P Robson		
168	Bear Club (The)	R Gilchrist				
170	Lovesick Collier Lass (The)	J P Robson	All round my hat			
172	Lays of the Tyne Exile – No 1 The Departure	J P Robson				
173	Newcastle Races	W Watson				
175	Donocht Head	George Pickering	Ye Banks and Braes	Author given as "R Pickering"		
175	comment on			Donocht Head		
176	Galvanic Rings	J P Robson	Bow Wow			
179	Collier's Keek at the Nation (The)	R Gilchrist			F-G2	
180	Fishwives' Carol (The)	M Ross	Nae luck aboot the house			
182	Lovely Mary	Gilchrist	Sleeping Maggie	originally "Lovely Delia"		
182	comment on			slight amendments by the editor (J P Robson)		
183	Newcastle Theatre in an Uproar	not given				
186	Pitman's Dream (The) – or A description of the North Pole	Emery	Newcastle Fair	in 2 parts		
188	Pitman's Dream (The) – or His description of the Kitchen	Emery	Merrily Dance the Quaker			
190	Baboon (The)	Armstrong				
192	Skipper's Mistake (The)	Armstrong	The Chapter of Accidents			
194	Sandgate Lass's Lament (The)	H Robson	The Bonny Pit Laddie			
195	Coaly Tyne	not given	Auld Lang Syne			
196	New Fish Market (The)	William Mitford	Scots come o'er the Border	author given as W Midford		
198	Local Militia-Man (The)	William Mitford	Madam Fag's Gala	author given as W Midford		
200	Wreckenton Hiring	not given				
203	Victory (The) – or The Captain Done Over	not given	Oh! The golden days of Good Queen Bess			
205	Bob Cranky's Adieu	J Shield				
207	Oysterwife's Petition (The) – (on The Removal of the Oyster-Tub From The Quay)	Emery	The Bold Dragoon			
207	short bio			the Oyster-Tub		
209	Jenny Lind – or the Pitman in Love	J P Robson	Polly Parker, O	described as improved		
210	Irish Lawyer (The)	J P Robson	The Mistletoe bough			
212	Bob Stacker's Secret – or how to prove your friends	J P Robson	Canny Newcassel	this song marked "Copyright"		
214	Changes on the Tyne (The)	not given	Mitford Galloway			
218	Hail, Hail, Jenny Lind	J P Robson	I'm afloat			
219	Geordy's Disaster	not given	The Baboon			
222	Battle on the Shields Railway (Between A Town Councillor and an Architect and the Pollis)	not given	Cappy's the Dog			
227	Sandgate Wife's Nurse's Song	Robert Nunn	A Sailor's Wife has nought to dee	according to Farne Archives Henry Robson	A-N1	
228	Euphy's Coronation	T Marshall	Arthur McBride			
231	More Innovations	Robert Gilchrist	The Bold Dragoon			
231	short bio	Robert Gilchrist				
233	Cliffs of Virginia (The)	not given	Drops of Brandy	Shields Songster		
235	Lays of the Tyne Exile – No 2 Maid of my Bossom	J P Robson	The Beggar Girl			
236	Nanny Jackson's letter to Lord Morpeth	J P Robson	Canny Newcassel			
238	Newcastle Improvements	R.Charlton	Canny Newcassel	Author actually given erroneously as "T" Charlton in this book		
240	Barber's News (The) (or Shields in an Uproar)	J Shield	Miss Bailey's Ghost		Fr-Tune 2	
245	Quayside Shaver (The)	W Stephenson Senior				
248	Eagle Steam Packet (The)	William Mitford		author given as W Midford		
250	Tyne Cossacks (The)	W Mitford	The Bold Dragoon			
253	Mally and the Prophet	Emery	Barbara Bell			
253	short bio			The prophet		
255	When We were at the Skeul	J P Robson		Nae luck aboot the house		
258	Pitman Pilgrim (The) – or A keek at the Roman Wall	J P Robson	The Kebbuckstane Wedding	this song marked "Copyright"		
261	comment on			errors in the description of the wall		
262	Skipper's Account of the Orangemen's Procession (The)					
264	Hydrophobia – or the Skipper&Quaker	Emery		title condensed		
266	Canny Sheels	John Morrison		author given in index as "John Morris"		
269	Famed Filly Fair – or A peep in Pilgrim Street on a Sunday Neet	not given				
272	Permanent Yeast	John Morrison		author given in index as "J Morrison"		
272	comment on			Yeast		
273	Masquerade at Newcastle Theatre (or The Pitman Turned Critic)	William Mitford		author given as W Midford		
276	She Wore an Old Straw Bonnet	J P Robson	She wore a Wreath of Roses			
278	Lays of the Tyne Exile – No 3 Banks of Tyne	J P Robson	Roy's Wife			
279	Height of my Ambitions (The)	J P Robson	Nancy Dawson			
281	Come Up to the Scratch – (or The Pitman Haggish'd)	Robert Emery	Calder Fair			
284	Sir Tommy Made An Odd Fellow	Gilchrist	Canny Newcassel			
286	Blind Willy's Flight	R Emery	Betsy Baker			
287	New Markets (The)	Oliver	Canny Newcassel	alternative title "Newcastle Improvements"		
289	Natural Philosopher (The) (or The Downfall of Learned Humbugs)	not given	Canny Newcassel			
290	Mary Drue	T Houston	My Johnny's Grey Breeks			
292	Billy Purvis's Bundle – or A Corker for the Geordies	J P Robson	King of the Cannibal Islands	this song marked "Copyright"		
296	Billy's Grand Show	J P Robson	Barbara Bell			
298	Geordie's Letter Frae Callerforney	T Kennedy	Hydrophobie			
301	Pitman's Description of "La Perouse" (The) – performed for many nights at the South Shields Theatre	not given	Betsy Baker			
303	Blind Willy Singing	not given	Jemmy Joneson's Whurry			
305	Pardon Dean	Gilchrist	The Banks O' Doon			
306	Tom Carr and Waller Watson – or Tom and Jerry at Home	W Oliver	There was a Bold Dragoon			
308	Voyage to Lunnen (A)	Gilchrist				
312	Pitman's Draw (The)	J P Robson	Barbara Bell			
314	Ikeybo – or The Wonder of Guano	Geddes	Barbara Bell			
317	Jesmond Mill	Phill "Primrose" Hodgson		also "Phil" and "Primrose"		
319	Lizzie Liberty	H Robson	Tibby Fowler I' the Glen			
320	Lays of the Tyne Exile – No 4 in Childhood We Wander	J P Robson	The old house at home			
321	Tyne (The) – song number 2	Henry Robson		In Britain's Blessed Island		
322	Loyal Festivities – or Novel Scenes at Newcastle	William Mitford	Betsy Baker	Called "Loyal Fishwives" author as "W Midford" in index		
322	comment on	George IV				
325	Picture of Newcastle (or George the Fourth's Coronation)	W Mitford	Arthur McBride			
325	comment on	William Mitford		Town Moor public meeting 11 October 1849		
329	Bold Archy and Blind Willie's Lament (On the Death of Captain Starkey)	not given	The Bold Dragoon	called "Bold Airchy's Lament"		
331	comment on	Messrs Green		and the balloon Balloon		
331	Green's Balloon	not given	Barbara Bell			
334	Nanny of the Tyne	J Gibson	The Rose of Allendale			
335	Softest Flowers (The)	J P Robson	The Young May Moon			
336	Ye Sons of great Apollo	J P Robson	British Grenadiers			
337	Oh Tell me not the other Lands	B. Crow	Lucy Neal			
338	Over the Waves of the Soft Flowing Tyne	J P Robson	Over the Water to Charlie			
339	Pawnshop in a Bleeze (The) – or The Spout without Water	J P Robson	X. Y. Z.	this song marked "Copyright"		
342	Owl (The)	Emery	X. Y. Z.			
343	comment on			public houses mentioned in "The Owl"		
343	Northumberland Free of Newcastle – Composed Extempore, on the Duke of Northumberland being presented with the Freedom of Newcastle	R Gilchrist				
345	Parson Malthus	H Robson	Ranting Roaring Willie			
347	My Lord 'Size	J Shield				
351	Tim Tunbelly	Oliver	Canny Newcassel			
353	Shields Chain Bridge – Humorously described by a pitman	Oliver		note archaic spelling of Humorously	F-O1	
356	Stars O' Hartlepool (The)	Mr W thompson	Barbara Bell	the index erroneously shows J P Robson as author		
358	Lays of the Tyne Exile – No 5 – Farewell Fair Fields	J P Robson				
358	short bio	Mr W thompson				
359	Auld Wife's Plaint	J P Robson	The Old Kirk-Yard			
360	comment on			inclusion of "Auld Wife's Plaint"		
361	Old Burn (The)	B. Crow	My ain fireside			
362	Prentice's Ramble to the Races (The) – or the House of Correction	T. Jackson	Baggy Nanny			
366	Sweet Tyneside	T Kennedy	Kelvin Grove			
367	Sandgate Girl's Lament (The)	not given				
369	Trip to Warkworth	Emery	King of the Cannibal Islands			
369	comment on			the works outing to Warkworth		
372	Bob Crank's Leum'nation Neet	J Shield				
375	Toon of Other Days – A Parody on "The Light of Other Days"	R P Sutherland	The light of other days			
377	Hymn of the Hungarians	J P Robson	Scots wha hae	this song marked "Copyright"		
378	comment on			anniversary of Battle of Bosworth		
379	England, the Anchor of Hope to the World	J P Robson	Hearts of Oak			
381	Lays of the Tyne Exile – No 6 Exile's Return (The)	J P Robson	The Keel Row (slow)			
382	Ale, Ale, All Ale	J P Robson	The Sea Serpent			
385	comment on authorship			of Ale, Ale, All Ale		
386	Royal Visit (The)	W Oliver	X. Y. Z.			
388	St. Nicholas' Great Bell	not given	The King of the Cannibals	according to Farne Archives J P Robson		
390	Dames of England	Dr David Ross Lietch				
391	Clock Face (The)	Oliver	The Bold Dragoon			
392	Dance To Thy Daddy	W Watson	The Little Fishy			
394	Dutchess And Mayoress (The)	not given	The Young May Moon	Written in September 1819		
396	Till the Tide Came In	H Robson				
396	New Song For Barge-Day 1835 (A)	Gilchrist		Sung on board of the Steward's Steam-boat		
398	Moral			to Barge song		
399	Brittania's Reproach	J P Robson	The Death of Nelson			
400	Land of Sad Hibernia (The)	J P Robson	The Old English Gentleman			
402	Nice Old Gill (The)	J Jackson				
402	Comment on			the "political" society		
405	Pitman's Ghost (The)	incognito	Sprig of Shelalah			
410	Hell's Kitchen	not given	Miss Bailey's Ghost			
412	comment on			Hell's Kitchen contributed by Mr R Emery		
412	Bonny Geatsiders 1805 (The)	J Shield	Bob Cranky			
415	Sim of Dundee	not given	Newcastle Races			
415	short bio	Capt John Sim				
416	comment on			The waggon-way		
416	Song of Improvements	Gilchrist	Cappy's the Dog	sung by the author at a dinner in the New Butcher Market 22 Oct 1835		
418	I'm A Snob	not given	I'm Afloat			
419	To Kelvin Grove we'll go – The Lassie's Reply	H Robson				
420	Water of Tyne (The)	not given				
421	Home in early Years (My)	T F Davidson	The Rose of Allendale			
422	comment on			Editor's praise for author		
423	Come Awake!, Oh Arise!	J P Robson	The Swiss Boy			
424	Byron, the first in the song	J P Robson	While the Lads of the Village			
424	comment on			The editor's early work		
425	Her soft Melting Eye	J P Robson	Her mouth with a smile			
425	Moderate Man (The)	T Kennedy	Jemmy Joneson's Whurry			
428	High Level Bridge (The)	J P Robson	Drops of Brandy			
430	Ether Doctor (The)	J P Robson	Caller Fair			
432	Tell it not in Gath	B. Crow	Caller Fair			
432	Comment on			local details		
434	Cut at Wor Toon (A) – or Billy Thompson's Smiddy	J P Robson	Barbara Bell	this song marked "Copyright"		
438	Newcastle is my native place	not given	We hae always been provided for			
439	Scene at Jesmond Gardens (A)	incognito	Lukey's Dream			
443	Sweet Tibbie Dunbar	D ----	The Boys of Kilkenny	a proposal		
444	Northern Minstrel's Budget (The)	H Robson				
451	Young Mary, Queen of Hearts!	D ----	The Boatie Row			
452	Sign of Ducrow (The)	not given	Gallant Huzzar			
454	Lass I Lo'e Sae Dearly (The)	T Kennedy				
455	Lass that shed a Tear for Me (Thew)	W Stephenson Junior	The lass that made the bed for me			
456	Collier's Farewell (The)	J P Robson	Fy, let's off to the bridal			
458	Newcastle in a Stoure	J P Robson	Betsy Baker			
460	Parody (A) – on the Red, Red Rose	not given	The Red Red Rose			
461	Visit to Billy's Show (A)	incognito	Tallygrip			
462	Gateshead Lass's Lament (The)	not given	Jessie of Dumblane			
464	Ellen	W Stephenson Junior	Robin Adair			
465	Canny Wife (My)	D ----	There's nae luck about the house			
466	Native Hills (My)	J P Robson	Mary Blane			
467	Contented Player (The)	J P Robson	John Jones			
469	Washing-Day – (The)	Thomas Wilson				
471	Peter Allen's Death	not given	John Anderson my Jo !			
473	Mally's Dream	Edward Corvan		A parody on the "Wife's Dream"	R-C1	
475	Banks of the North (The)	S E Preston				
476	Marsden Rock	John Peacock	Jockey to the Fair	Author actually given erroneously as "T Peacock" in this book		
478	Itinerant Confectioner (The)	W Stephenson Senior	Bob and Joan			
480	Merry Lads of Gyetshead	not given	Sunny Banks of Scotland	actually spelt as "Gateshead" in this book		
481	Northumbrian's Farewell (The)	not given	Adieu my native land adieu			
483	Homeward Bound	J P Robson	Black Ey'd Susan	A story from the "Chronicle"		
484	Canny Newcastle Again	T Oliver				
485	comment on			nature generally		
485	Oh, I'll never Forget	J P Robson	The Bridal Ring			
487	Queen's visit to Newcastle 1849 (The)	J P Robson	Polly's nickstick			
488	comment on			lack of clergy in church		
490	Yon Orb is Sinking	Thomas Oliver				
491	Young Donald	J P Robson	On the Banks of Allen Water			
492	Shields Races	Songster	The de'il cam' fiddling through the toon			
494	Jenny Lind – or the Pitman in Love	J P Robson	Mrs Clark	described as original		
495	Answers from Alice Grey	J P Robson				
496	Age of Eighty	W Stephenson Senior	Age of Eighty			
497	Stream of a Thousand Fallen Adieu	T Oliver				
499	Systems of Life (The)	J P Robson	Merrily Dance the Quaker's Wife			
500	Summer hath come again	J P Robson	Blow the wind Sutherly			
502	Night with a Jovial Set (A)	J P Robson	A life on the Ocean Wave			
503	Willy Wier	D ----	Lass o' Gowrie			
503	comment on			Lochmaben		
503	Town Clerk's Safety Valve (The)	not given				
505	Canny Wife's reply to page 465	D.	Auld Lang Syne	see "My Canny Wife" from page 465		
506	Opening of the Markets	not given				
508	Old Nick's Visit To H---'s Kitchen	Emery	The King of the Cannibal Isles			
510	Charley's Return from the Ocean	Valentine	I'm oftentimes Drunk, and Seldom Sober			
512	Hail, Hail, to the Order	J P Robson				
513	Smiling Betsy	W Stephenson Junior	Dainty Davy			
514	Wail of the Fallen (The)	J P Robson				
515	Common Sense	not given	Maggie Lauder			
516	Newcastle on Saturday Night	W Stephenson Senior	Newcastle Ale			
520	Tyne Fair 1813–14	W Mitford		In commemoration of the frost		
523	Wor new Gaol and Kitty	not given	Jemmy Joneson's Whurry			
524	Skipper's Voyage to the Museum (The)	D C	Barbara Bell			
526	comment on			Nichol's shop		
529	Fire and Water – or Nervoni disappointed	not given	Duke Willey and a nobleman			
531	Happy Days	J P Robson	Mary Blane			
532	Isabel	J P Robson	A Rose Tree full in Bearing			
533	He Thought on the Maid	J P Robson	The flower of Dumblane			
534	Lover's Tear (The)	J P Robson	The Soldier's Tear			
535	O Far Away	not given				
536	Staffordshire Ware	W Mitford	One New Year's Day			
537	Bewildered Skipper (The)	William Mitford	The bewildered Maid	author given as W Midford		
538	Hangman and the Calf (The)	William Mitford	The Dey of Algiers	author given as W Midford		
540	Tyne Heroes	W Mitford	Canny Newcassel			
542	empty					
543	Glossary					
552	Printed by A S Crow, 32 Sandhill, Newcastle					

=== Notes ===
A-M2 – according to George Allan's Tyneside Songs and Readings of 1891, the writer is James Morrison
A-N1 – according to George Allan's Tyneside Songs and Readings of 1891, the writer is Robert Nunn
A-S4 – according to George Allan's Tyneside Songs and Readings of 1891, the writer is William Stephenson (junior)
Br-S6 – according to Brockie's “The Shields Garland", the writer is John Stobbs
F-G1 – according to Fordyce's Tyne Songster of 1840, the writer is John Gibson
F-O1 – according to Fordyce's Tyne Songster of 1840, the writer is Oliver
Fr-Tune2 – according to France's Songs of the Bards of the Tyne – 1850, the tune is "Miss Bailey's Ghost"
Fr-Tune3 – according to George Allan's Tyneside Songs and Readings of 1891, the tune is "Derry Down"
R-C1 – according to Ross' Songs of the Tyne of 1846, the writer is Edward Corvan

== See also ==
- Geordie dialect words
- P. France & Co.
