= J. M. Wedderburn =

J. M. Wedderburn (fl. before 1812) was an English songwriter from Newcastle, who, according to the information given by John Bell in his Rhymes of Northern Bards published in 1812, has the song "Nanny of the Tyne" attributed to this name.

The song was set to music by J Aldridge (Junior) of Newcastle. It is not written in Geordie dialect but has a strong Northern connection.

However, in The Tyne Songster, produced by W & T Fordyce in 1840, "Nanny of the Tyne" is attributed to "Gibson" (with no first name).

The same song, "Nanny of the Tyne", appears on page 334 of Songs of the Bards of the Tyne produced by P. France & Co. c. 1850, again attributed to "J. Gibson" - and also on page 17 of Volume 7 of The Songs of the Tyne produced by John Ross c. 1846, but in this book it is not attributed to any writer.

Nothing more appears to be known of this person, not even the first name, or their sex.

== See also ==
- Geordie dialect words
- Rhymes of Northern Bards
- The Songs of the Tyne by Ross
- The Tyne Songster by W & T Fordyce - 1840
- France's Songs of the Bards of the Tyne - 1850
