= William Stephenson (junior) =

Printer, publisher, auctioneer, poet, and songwriter (1797–1838)

William Stephenson (junior) (2 September 1797 – 20 May 1838) was a Geordie printer, publisher, auctioneer, poet and songwriter born in Gateshead, England. He was the son of William Stephenson (senior).

He started work as a printer and soon opened his own business at the Bridge End, Gateshead.

Much of his business seemed to come from the cheap chapbooks, song slips, many to the hawkers together with last dying confessions; these seem to be the objects which keep turning up in collections. Shortly after closure of The Gateshead Intelligencer, he gave up his printing work and became an auctioneer.

After his death, the Gateshead Observer of 26 May 1838 carried a notice which read “On Sunday (May 20), after a long illness, aged 40, much respected, Mr. W. Stephenson, printer"

== Works ==
These include :-

=== Publishing and/or printing ===
In 1824 he published a small chapbook “The Tyneside Minstrel” which contained the works of William Mitford, William Oliver, his father William Stephenson (senior), himself and others. His own works in this book include “Beggar’s Wedding" which is signed “S” and more than 10 pieces signed “X” including The Lass that shed a tear for me” and “Ellen”.

In 1834 he published his father's collection of poems and songs

In 1830 he introduced a new periodical, "The Gateshead Intelligencer", a sixpenny monthly which was half newspaper and half magazine. It ran from 1830 to 1833

=== Poetry and songwriting ===
The Beggar's Wedding
Ellen
The Lass that shed a tear for me
Merry Lads of Gyetshead
The Sandhill Monkey
Smiling Betty

== See also ==
- Geordie dialect words
- Thomas Allan
- Allan's Illustrated Edition of Tyneside Songs and Readings
- P. France & Co.
- France's Songs of the Bards of the Tyne - 1850
- W & T Fordyce
- The Tyne Songster
- John Ross
- The Songs of the Tyne by Ross
