= List of Geordie singers =

The list of Geordie singers is a list of singers who are Geordies. Geordie is the regional nickname given to people from the Tyneside region of North East England. Geordie is also the name given to the dialect of English that they speak. Geordie singers are singers who are from the Tyneside region of England or singers who speak in the Geordie dialect. Most Geordie singers have only recorded Geordie dialect songs and feature on compilation albums of Geordie songs, however, some Geordie singers have found mainstream success in pop music, one of these being Sting from the band The Police.

== Pre-20th century singers ==
- James Cosgrove uses stage name of J C Scatter - Songwriter and also a 19C/20C singer of many dialect songs including "Blaydon Races" - from the CD Early Recordings Of Artists From The North East 1904-1933 (on Phonograph, PHCD2K1)
- Harry Nelson - songwriter and singer

== 20th century and onward singers ==
- Thomas Allen - 20th & 21st century singer of many dialect songs including "Caa' Hawkie" from the CD Songs of Northumbria (MWMCDSP86)
- Ron Angel - 20th & 21st century singer of many dialect songs including "Cleveland Steel" from the CD From Tees to Tyne (MWMCDSP51)
- Sheila Armstrong - 20th & 21st century singer of many dialect songs including "Blow The Wind Southerly" from the CD Songs of Northumbria (MWMCDSP86)
- Owen Brannigan - 20th century singer of many dialect songs including "Bobby Shaftoe" from the CD Sings Scottish and Newcastle (MWMCDSP22)
- Eric Burdon - 20th & 21st century singer and former member of the Animals.
- Cheryl - British pop singer, formerly in girl group Girls Aloud and currently a solo singer with five UK Singles Chart number ones.
- David Clelland - MP and 20th century (part-time) singer of "The Socialist ABC" from the CD From Tees to Tyne (MWMCDSP51)
- Graeme Danby - 20th & 21st century singer of many dialect songs including "The Tanfield Lea Silver Model Band" from the CD Sings stories from the North East (MWMCDSP29)
- Mike Elliott - 20th & 21st century entertainer
- Bryan Ferry - 20th & 21st century (vocalist with Roxy Music), singer of many songs including "The Lambton Worm" from the CD From Tees to Tyne (MWMCDSP51)
- Bob Fox - 20th & 21st century singer from Wearside, who has recorded a number of Geordie dialect songs
- Alex Glasgow - 20th & 21st century singer of many dialect songs including "Dance To Yer Daddy" from the CD From Tyne to Tweed (MWM CDSP52)
- Robson Green - 20th & 21st century actor and singer of many dialect songs, including "Keep Yer Feet Still", from the CD From Tyne to Tweed (MWM CDSP52)
- Jed Grimes - a North East musician, who played in folk-rock band called Hedgehog Pie in the 1970s. In 2001, he formed The Hush and has since produced a variety of tracks for the Northumbria Anthology, including two contributions by Brian Johnson.
- Johnny Handle - 20th & 21st century singer of many dialect songs including "Stottin' Doon The Waall", from the CD From Tyne to Tweed (MWM CDSP52)
- David Haslam - Assistant conductor of the Northern Sinfonia Orchestra
- Tim Healy - 20th & 21st century actor and singer of many dialect songs, including "The Neighbours Doon Belaa" from the CD From Tyne to Tweed (MWM CDSP52)
- The High Level Ranters - 20th & 21st century folk group of many dialect songs including "Drunken Bella Roy" from the CD Northumbrian Journey (MWMCDSP58)
- Brian Johnson - 20th & 21st century singer of many dialect songs, including "Wor Geordie's Lost His Liggy" from the CD From Tees to Tyne (MWMCDSP51)
- Louisa Jo Killen - 20th & 21st century singer of many dialect songs (one time member of the High Level Ranters and The Clancy Brothers)
- Mark Knopfler - 20th & 21st century guitarist, singer, and founder member of the band Dire Straits
- Lindisfarne - 20th & 21st century folk rock group, singers of many dialect songs including "All Fall Down" from the CD From Tyne to Tweed (MWM CDSP52)
- Jimmy Nail - 20th & 21st century actor and sometimes singer of dialect songs including "Water of Tyne" (with Sting) from the CD From Tyne to Tweed (MWM CDSP52)
- Alan Price - 20th & 21st century pop singer (of The Animals and The Alan Price Set) of many songs including "There's More To Life" from the CD From Tyne to Tweed (MWM CDSP52)
- Claire Rutter - 20th & 21st century singer of many dialect songs including "My Sunderland Lass" (with Graeme Danby) from the CD From Tees to Tyne (MWMCDSP51)
- Spike - 20th & 21st century hard rock singer, frontman of The Quireboys and solo artist.
- Dave Stewart - 20th & 21st century pop singer (of The Eurythmics) and of many songs including "The Blackleg Song" from the CD From Tees to Tyne (MWMCDSP51)
- Sting - 20th & 21st century pop singer (of The Police) and singer of "Water of Tyne" (with Jimmy Nail) from the CD From Tyne to Tweed (MWM CDSP52)
- The Unthanks - 20th & 21st century English folk group from Northumberland
- Denise Welch - 20th & 21st century singer of many dialect songs including "Hev Ye Seen Wor Jimmy?" from the CD From Tyne to Tweed (MWM CDSP52)
- Kevin Whately - 20th century actor and sometime singer of dialect songs, including "The Toon Improvement Bill" from the CD From Tyne to Tweed (MWM CDSP52)
- Ginger Wildheart - 20th & 21st century rock singer and guitarist best known as the frontman of The Wildhearts and as the former second guitarist for The Quireboys from 1987 to 1989
- John Woodvine - 20th & 21st century actor and sometime singer of dialect songs, including "Aw Wish Yor Muther Wad Cum" from the CD Northern Drift & Joe Lives (MWMCDSP97)

== See also ==
- Geordie dialect words
- Allan's Illustrated Edition of Tyneside Songs and Readings
- Fordyce's Tyne Songster
- France's Songs of the Bards of the Tyne - 1850
- The Bishoprick Garland (1834, by Sharp)
- Rhymes of Northern Bards
- Marshall's Collection of Songs, Comic, Satirical 1827
- The Songs of the Tyne by Ross
- The Songs of the Tyne by Walker
- Original (Geordie) Local Songs By Thomas Marshall 1829
