= The Songs of the Tyne by Walker =

Folk songs from the Geordie area of England

The Songs of the Tyne (or to give it its full title The Songs of the Tyne being a collection of Popular Local Songs Number 1 – published by William R Walker, Printer &c., Royal Arcade, Newcastle) is a Chapbook of Geordie folk song consisting of three small volumes, published between 1857 and 1866. (There is a slight difference on the cover of Volumes 2 & 3 which are "by W R Walker, Printer and Publisher"). This is the second of the series, a first series of ten chapbooks was published around 1850 by John Ross.

== The publication ==
William R Walker edited the three volumes of The Songs of the Tyne, a series of booklets containing "local" songs by local Tyneside composers, some well known at the time, others not.

A set of the original documents were kept in the archives of Newcastle University. They are published by the William R Walker, Printer and Publisher, Royal Arcade, Newcastle.

== Contents ==
The volumes and their contents are below :-

vol	pages	title	tune	songwriter	note	ref
1		Volume 1 published between 1857 and 1866				
1	1	assume front cover				
1	2	assume inner				
1	7–9	Famed Filly Fair		unknown		
1	9–10	Paganini, the Fiddler	The Kebbuckstane Wedding	Robert Emery		
1	10	Blind Wilie's Death (or Deeth)	Jemmy Joneson's Whurry	Robert Nunn		
1	20–21	The Pitman's Happy Times	In the days when we went gipsying	Joseph Philip Robson		
1	22–24	When we were at the Skuel	Nae luck aboot the hoose	name not given but by actually written by Joseph Philip Robson		
1	24	Marsden Rock House		William Mitford		
1	also	Canny Newcassel		name not given but by actually written by Thomas Thompson		
1	also	Cappy, the Pitman's Dog	Chapter of Donkeys	name not given but by actually written by William Mitford		
1	also	High Level Bridge	Drops of Brandy	name not given but by actually written by Joseph Philip Robson		
1	also	Lucky's Dream (sometimes "Luckey's Dream")	Caller Fair	name not given but by actually written by Robert Nunn		
1	also	The Skipper's Wedding		??		
1	also	The Pitman's Courtship	The Night before Larry was stretch'd – or – The Irish Drops o' Brandy	name not given but by actually written by William Mitford		
1	also	Tyne Exile's Return		??		
1	also	Wonderful Tallygrip	Barbara Bell	name not given but by actually written by Joseph Philip Robson		
1	24	printers name – therefore assume last page				
2	Volume 2					
2	1	assume cover				
2	2	asuume inner				
2	3–6	Polly's Nick-Stick	X-Y-Z	Joseph Philip Robson		
2	6–7	The Skipper's Fright	Skipper Carr and Marky Dann	unknown		
2	7–9	Newcastle in a Stoure		unknown		
2	9–12	The Dent's Hole Cachuka		unknown		
2	12–14	The New Keel Row	The Keel Row	Thomas Thompson		
2	14–16	Jemmy Joneson's Whurry		Thomas Thompson		
2	16–17	The Little Pee Dee	Drops of Brandy	unknown		
2	17–18	The Glister		William Armstrong		
2	18–20	Cuddy Willy's Deeth		Joseph Philip Robson		
2	20	Weel May the Keel Row		??		
2	21	Harry Clasper	Famous Aud Cappy	Joseph Philip Robson		
2	22–23	Hamlick, Prince of Denton – part 1	Merrily dance the Quaker's Wife	Joseph Philip Robson		
3	Volume 3					
3	1	assume cover				
3	2	asuume inner				
3	3–6	Conclusion of Hamlick, Prince of Denton	Merrily dance the Quaker's Wife	Joseph Philip Robson		
3	6–7	The Pitman's Skellyscope		William Mitford		
3	8–9	Billy Oliver's Ramble, between Denton and Newcastle		unknown		
3	9–10	The Bonny Clock Fyece	Cole Hole	Robert Nunn		
3	10–12	The Wail of the Fallen	I'm sitting by the stile, Mary	??		
3	12–13	Newcassel Props		William Oliver		
3	13–15	The Skipper's Mistake	The Chapter of accidents	unknown		
3	15–16	My Bonny Bairn	Mary Blane	unknown		
3	16–17	The Gutta Percha Tallygrip	Barbara Bell	J. Sutherland		
3	18	The Collier's Farewell	Oh fie, let's of the bridal	unknown		
3	19–20	Newcassel as it was, an' as it's noo	The light of other days	R. P. Sutherland		
3	20–21	Hydrophobie – or The Skipper and the Quaker	Good morrow to your night Cap	Robert Emery		
3	22–23	The Sandgate Lass's Lamentation		unknown		
3	23–24	Lovely Delia	Sleeping Maggy	??		

== See also ==
- Geordie dialect words
