= Robinson Peter Sutherland =

Robinson Peter Sutherland (1820 – ) was a 19th-century English author, poet and songwriter in Tyneside.

Between the years of 1824 and 1860, the centre of old Newcastle was basically demolished and rebuilt as a result of Richard Grainger's town planning exercise. The result was wider and cleaner streets, more attractive places of commerce and business, repositioning of the old traditional markets, and a loss of the old smelly slum areas, but also the loss of many historical areas, town walls and gates, etc. and tradition.

Most of Sutherland's songs laments the passing of the 'old toon' or the similar changes which took place to the riverside areas.

== Works ==
- "Newcassel as it was, an' as it's noo" - The first sign of his work appeared in 1842 when he published a book of his own works entitled "Geordy Brown's Budget of Laughables", a book of 19 pages containing "A Collection of Original Comic Songs, Medleys, & Recitations in the Newcastle Dialect". This book included "Newcassel as it was, an' as it's noo", sung to the tune of "The light of other days".

This song later appeared in The Songs of the Tyne published by William R Walker.

- "Newcassel bangs the world"– sung to the tune of "The New Policeman" appeared in The Songs of the Tyne published by John Ross
- "Toon of other days, a parody on 'The light of other days"– appeared in Songs of the Bards of the Tyne published by P. France & Co.
- "Maw bonny nanny goat"– sung to the tune of "Bonny Ellerslie" appeared in The Songs of the Tyne published by John Ross
- "Newcastle is gaun to the wall"– sung to the tune of "Jenny Jones" appeared in The Songs of the Tyne published by John Ross
- "There's a grand time comin'"– appeared in The Songs of the Tyne published by John Ross
- "Changes on the Tyne"– located in among sundry papers in the estate of publisher Thomas Allan.

== See also ==
- Geordie dialect words
