= Metcalf Ross =

Metcalf Ross (c. 1754 – 2 January 1858) was an English master printer and sometime poet/songwriter in Tyneside. He was born in Sunderland, Tyne and Wear.

There are two noted works by Ross.

The first, a song, is given different titles in the different chapbooks. It is entitled "A New Year's Carol (A) (For the Fishwives of Newcastle)" - by Fordyce on page 138 of The Tyne Songster of 1840, and "The Fishwives Carol" – by France on page 180 of Songs of the Bards of the Tyne of 1850.

The second work, a poem, entitled "Address to Robert Emery" – allegedly written as a tribute on the death of Emery in 1870 – and given on page 290 of Allan's Illustrated Edition of Tyneside Songs and Readings of 1891.

== See also ==
- Geordie dialect words
- W & T Fordyce
- P. France & Co.
- France's Songs of the Bards of the Tyne - 1850
