= John Morrison (songwriter) =

John Morrison was a Tyneside songwriter from the early nineteenth century.

== Details ==
Thomas Allan in his 1891 version of Allan's Illustrated Edition of Tyneside Songs and Readings states that "Of the author we have no trace. Evidently a Sheels man, he contrives to cap Thompson, who, in making "Canny Newcassel" marrow the "Streets o' Lunnin" had not done amiss".

The only two works of his which seem to have survived are : Canny Sheels – showing that London compares poorly with Shields. Permanent Yeast – about the "new-fangled yeast" which no longer explodes – as in the advertisement of the day "Mr. Mawson’s ‘German Dried’ for me".

The author's name and his "Canny Sheels" first appeared in Davidson of Alnwick's "Collection of Tyneside Songs" published in 1840. Both songs appear in Fordyce’s "The Tyne Songster" published in 1840. Again both songs appear in "Songs of the Bards of the Tyne" published by P. France & Co. in 1850, although he erroneously credits the authorship of "Canny Shields" to "J Morris" in the front index section. Thomas Allan in his 1891 version of "Allan's Illustrated Edition of Tyneside Songs and Readings" publishes details of "Canny Sheels" only but refers to "Permanent Yeast" as being a second song by him "but it is much inferior to the first".

Both songs are written in the Geordie dialect.

== See also ==
Geordie dialect words
The Tyne Songster (W & T Fordyce, 1840)
W & T Fordyce (publishers)
France's Songs of the Bards of the Tyne - 1850
P. France & Co.
Joseph Philip Robson
Thomas Allan (publisher)
Allan's Illustrated Edition of Tyneside Songs and Readings
