= The Songs of the Tyne by Ross =

Song

The Songs of the Tyne is a chapbook of Geordie dialect songs, consisting of ten small volumes, and published c. 1846. It was the first in what became a series of publications; a second series of just three chapbooks was published c. 1850 by William R Walker.

== The publication ==
John Ross edited the ten volumes of "The Songs of the Tyne", a series of booklets containing "local" songs by "local" Tyneside composers, some well known at the time, others not.
A set of the original documents were kept in the archives of Newcastle University.
They are published by the John Ross, Printer and Publisher, Royal Arcade, Newcastle.

== Contents ==
vol	pages	title	tune	songwriter	note	ref
1		Volume 1 published c1843				
1	1	assume front cover				
1	2	assume inner				
1	3–4	Blind Willy's Death (or Blind Willie's Deeth) -Died 20 July 1832	Jemmy Joneson's Whurry	Robert Nunn		
1	5–6	Wonderful Tallygrip		unknown		
1	6–7	Encore verses to the Wonderful Tallygrip		??		
1	7–9	The Pitman's Courtship		William Mitford		
1	9–10	Tyne Exile's Return		unknown		
1	10–12	Lukey's Dream		unknown		
1	12–14	The Ether Doctor		unknown		
1	14–16	The Skipper's Wedding		William Stephenson		
1	16–17	Calleyforney O !	Polly Parker	J. Bagnall		
1	17–19	The High Level Bridge		unknown		
1	19–20	Jenny Lind, or the Pitman in Love		unknown		
1	20–22	Cappy, or The Pitman's Dog		William Mitford		
1	22–24	Canny Newcassel		unknown		
1	24	printers name – therefore assume last page		.		
4		Volume 4				
4	1	assume front cover				
4	2	assume inner				
4	3–4	The Newcassel Worthies	We've aye been provided for	William Armstrong		
4	4–5	Aud Wife's Paint	The Old Kirk Yard	??		
4	5–6	Newcastle Bangs the World	The New Policeman	R. P. Sutherland		
4	.6–8	There's a grand time comin'		R. P. Sutherland		
4	8–10	Gutta Percha	Canny Newcassel	unknown		
4	10–12	Tyneside Keelman	Literary Dustman	unknown		
4	12–13	Bonny Keel Laddie		unknown		
4	13–14	Nanny Jackson's letter to Lord Morpeth	Canny Newcassel	unknown		
4	14–15	The Tyne	Banks and Braes o' Bonny Doon	??		
4	15–16	St. Nicholas' Church		unknown		
4	16–17	Keelmen and the grindstone	Derry Down	unknown		
4	17–19	Sension Da, man	Newcassel Props	unknown		
4	19–20	The Noodle	Jeanette and Jeanot	John Brodie Gilroy		
4	20–21	The Jenny Howlett – or Lizzie Mudie's Ghost		William Armstrong		
4	21-??	Tyne Conservancy versus Newcastle and Shields	The New Policeman	??		
5		Volume 5				
5	1	assume front cover				
5	2	assume inner				
5	3 & 4	Famed Filly Fair – or A peep in Pilgrim Street on a Sunday Neet		unknown		
5	5 & 6	The Pitman's Happy Times	In the days when we went gipsying	Joseph Philip Robson		
5		When we were at the skeul		??		
5	9 & 10	The lass of Wincomblee	Nae luck about the house	unknown		
5	10, 11, 12 & 13	Newcastle Landlords 1834		William Watson		
5	13	Marsden Rock house	Alice Grey	??		
5	15 & 16	Paganini, the fiddler – or The Pitman's frolic	The Keebuckstane Wedding	Robert Emery		
5	16, 17 & 18	Bessie McFee	Kathleen O' Morre	unknown		
5	18, 19 & 20	Newcastle Fair		unknown		
5	20, 21 & 22	Tom Johnson	Tallygrip	J. Bagnall		
5	22 & 23	The Keelman's visit to the Cassel	Merrily dance the Quaker's wife	unknown		
6		Volume 6				
6	1	assume front cover		??		
6	2	assume inner		??		
6	3–4	Commit no nonsense	Derry Down	unknown		
6	4–7	Days and deeds of Shakespere	The Old English Gentleman	unknown		
6	7–9	Coaly Tyne	Auld Lang Syne	unknown		
6	9–10	Tommy Carr's discussion wiv his wife, on the choice of a trade for their son Jack	Cappy, or The Pitman's Dog	J. Bagnall		
6	11	The Pitman's Candidate	Jeanette and Jeanot	unknown		
6	12–13	Bob Crankie's Adieu	The Soldiers' Adieu	John "Jack" Shield		
6	13–16	The Keelmen of the Tyne	Sprig of shillalah	unknown		
6	16–17	Newcastle is gaun to the wall	Jenny Jones	R. P. Sutherland		
6	17–18	The Noodle's tear	The Soldiers' tear	unknown		
6	18-??	The New Land Society	The King of the Cannibal Islands	??		
6	??	Newcastle Hackney Coaches		??		
6	20–21	Nancy Wilkinson	Duncan Davison	unknown		
6	21–22	The Fishwives lament – on their removal from the Sandhill to the New Fish Market on 2 Jan 1826	Sleeping Maggie	unknown		
6	22–23	The militia	The Campbells Are Coming	unknown		
6	24	Peggy Waggy		unknown		
6	24	printers name – therefore assume last page				
7		Volume 7				
7	1	assume front cover				
7	2	assume inner				
7	3–5	The Pitman's museum		J. Bagnall		
7	5–6	Jesmond Mill		??		
7	6–8	Blind Willie Singin'		Robert Gilchrist		
7	8–9	Maw bonny nanny goat	Bonny Ellerslie	R. P. Sutherland		
7	9-11	The Pitman's ramble	The Keebuckstane Wedding	unknown		
7	11–12	The Tyne		??		
7	13–14	Newcastle Market	Adam and Eve	J. N.		
7	14–16	Thumping Luck	Gang nae mair to yon town	William Watson		
7	16–17	Sandgate Pant – or Jane Jemieson's Ghost	I'd be a butterfly	Robert Emery		
7	17–18	Nanny of the Tyne		??		
7	18–19	Beggar's Wedding	Quayside shaver	William Stephenson		
7	19–21	Callerforney – A dialogue	Alley Creaker	J. Bagnall		
7	22–23	The Newcassel Blunderbuss – or ravelling extraordinary	Calder Fair	unknown		
7	23–24	The Pitman's dream – or A description of the North Pole	Newcastle Fair	Robert Emery		
8		Volume 8				
8	1	assume front cover				
8	2	assume inner				
8	3–4	Pandon Dean		??		
8	4–5	Two Hundred Years to come	Days we went gipsying	J. Bagnall		
8	6–8	The local militia-man	Madam Figg's Gala	unknown		
8	8–10	The worthy rector		??		
8	10–11	Geordy's disaster		unknown		
8	11–12	The Friar and the Nun – A midnight Colloquy of the Nun's Field		unknown		
8	13	Bessy of Blyth		unknown		
8	13–14	Tim Tunbelly	Canny Newcassel	William Oliver		
8	15–16	Shields Chain Bridge, humourously described by a Pitman			note archaic spelling of Humourously	
8	17–22	The Collier's Pay Week		Henry Robson		
8	22–24	She wore an old straw bonnet – A parody on She wore a wreath of roses		Joseph Philip Robson		
8	24	The Miner's Motto		unknown		
8	24	printers name – therefore assume last page				
9		Volume 9				
9	1	assume front cover				
9	2	assume inner				
9	3–6	Wor Molly turned bloomer	The King of the Cannibal Islands	Joseph Philip Robson		
9	6–7	The collier's keek at the Nation		Robert Gilchrist		
9	7–9	The Quack doctors		unknown, but later attributed to Robert Gilchrist		
9	9–12	Voyage to Lunnen		Robert Gilchrist		
9	12–13	Burdon's Address to the cavalry – A parody by James Morrison		James Morrison		
9	13–15	Bold Archy and Blind Willie's lament on the death of Capt. Starkey		unknown, but later attributed to Robert Gilchrist		
9	15–17	Newcassel Races		William Watson		
9	17–18	The Pitman's return from Calleyforney		unknown		
9	18–19	Maw wonderful wife	Barbara Bell	Joseph Philip Robson		
9	also	The Quayside Shaver		??		
9	also	The misfortunes of Roger and his wife		??		
9	also	Come up to the scratch – or The Pitman's Haggished		??		
9	also	In childhood we wander		??		
10		Volume 10				
10	1	assume front cover				
10	2	assume inner				
10	201–204	Bobby Bags, the poet	Billy Nuts, the poet	Joseph Philip Robson		
10	204–205	The Amphitrite		Robert Gilchrist		
10	205-?	Banks of the North		??		
10	206–207	Mally's dream – A parody on the wife's dream		Edward Corvan		
10	207–209	The Pitman's draw	Barbara Bell	Joseph Philip Robson		
10	209	The Old Burn	My ain fireside	B. Crowe		
10	209–210	I'm a snob – A parody on I'm afloat		unknown		
10	210–211	Maw wonderful wife	Barbara Bell	Joseph Philip Robson		
10	211–212	The use and abuse – or the Pitman and the preacher		Joseph Philip Robson		
10	213–214	The Keelman's reason for attending church	Jemmy Joneson's Whurry	Robert Nunn		
10	214–215	The Sandgate Lass on the Ropery Banks	The skipper's wedding	Robert Nunn		
10	216–217	Newcastle is my native place	We have always been provided for	unknown		
10	217–218	The Skipper's Dream		T. Moor		
10	218–220	The lovesick collier Lass	All around my hat	Joseph Philip Robson		
10	220–221	The devil – or The nanny goat	Weel bred Cappy	unknown		
10	221–222	The Cliffs of Virginia	Drops of brandy	unknown		
10	222	printers name – therefore assume last page				

== See also ==
- Geordie dialect words
