= The Tyne Songster (W & T Fordyce, 1840) =

Songbook, published 1840

- Author: W & T Fordyce
- Language: English (Geordie dialect)
- Genre: Chapbook
- Publisher: W & T Fordyce
- Publication date: 1840; 186 years ago
- Publication place: United Kingdom
- Media type: Print
- Pages: approx. 340 pages

The Tyne Songster is a chapbook style songbook, giving the lyrics of local, now historical songs, with a few bits of other information. It was published by W. & T. Fordyce of Newcastle upon Tyne in 1840.

== Details ==
The Tyne Songster (full title – "The Tyne Songster – A Choice Selection of Songs in the Newcastle Dialect – "No pompous strains, nor labour'd lines are here, But genuine mirth and sportive wit appear; Northumbria's genius, in her simple rhymes; Shall live an emblem to succeeding times – Newcastle: – Printed and sold by W & T Fordyce – 1840) is a chapbook style book of Geordie folk songs consisting of approximately 225 song lyrics on over 300 pages, published in 1840.

== The publication ==
It is, as the title suggests, a collection of songs which would have been popular, or topical, at the date of publication. There is very little in the way of biographies of any of the writers or histories of the events.

The front cover of the book was as thus :-

THE
TYNE SONGSTER
A CHOICE SELECTION OF:
SONGS
IN THE
Newcastle Dialect
¨¨¨¨¨¨¨¨¨¨¨¨¨¨¨¨¨¨¨¨¨¨¨¨¨¨¨¨¨¨¨¨¨¨¨¨¨¨¨¨¨¨¨¨¨¨¨
"No pompous strains, nor labour'd lines are here,
But genuine mirth and sportive wit appear;
Northumbria's genius, in her simple rhymes;
Shall live an emblem to succeeding times
¨¨¨¨¨¨¨¨¨¨¨¨¨¨¨¨¨¨¨¨¨¨¨¨¨¨¨¨¨¨¨¨¨¨¨¨¨¨¨¨¨¨¨¨¨¨¨
Newcastle:
PRINTED AND SOLD BY W. & T. FORDYCE
¨¨¨¨¨¨¨¨
1840

== Contents ==
Are as below :-

page	title	songwriter	tune	comments	Notes	Ref
v	Contents (pages "v" to "x")					
5	Canny Newcassel	T Thompson				
7	Quayside Shaver (The)	Wm Stephenson				
9	Jenny Hoolet (The) (or Lizzie Mudie's Ghost	Armstrong		usually called "The Jenny Howlet"		
10	Glister (The)	Armstrong				
11	Eagle Steam Packet (The)	Wm Midford				
12	Jemmy Joneson's Whurry	T Thompson				
14	Skipper's Wedding (The)	W Stephenson				
16	Amphitrite (The)	R Gilchrist				
17	My Lord 'Size	John Shield				
19	Cappy (or The Pitman's Dog)	Wm Midford				
21	Pitman's Courtship (The)	Wm Midford				
23	Baboon (The)	Armstrong				
23	Billy Oliver's Ramble (Between Benwell and Newcastle)					
25	Parody on Billy Oliver's Ramble (A)					
26	X. Y. Z. At Newcastle Races, 1814 (or Pitmen's Luck)	Wm Midford				
28	Newcastle Fair (or The Pitman Drinking Jackey)					
30	Little Pee Dee (The)					
31	Tyne Cossacks (The)	Wm Midford				
33	Pitman's Revenge (The) (Against Buonaparte)	Shield – attributed erroneously		Actually written by George Cameron		
35	Bob Cranky's 'Size Sunday	John Selkirk				
37	Bob Cranky's 'Leum'nation Neet	John Shield				
39	Pitman's Skellyscope (The)	Wm Midford				
40	Bonny Keel Laddie (The)					
41	Maw Canny Hinny					
42	Bob Cranky's Account	W Midford				
45	Bob Cranky's Adieu	John Shield				
46	Mayor of Bourdeaux (The) ( or Mally's Mistake)	Wm Midford				
48	Swalwell Hopping	Selkirk				
50	Winlaton Hopping	John Leonard		actually spelt in the index "John Lennard"		
52	Sandgate Girl's' Lamentation (The)					
53	Collier's Rant (The)					
54	(Weel May) The Keel Row					
55	New Keel Row (The)	T Thompson				
56	Sandhill monkey (The)					
58	Skipper's Dream (The)	T Moor				
59	Skipper's Account of the Orange-Men's Procession (The)					
60	Politicians (The)					
62	Till The Tide Came In	H Robson				
62	Sandgate Lassie's Lament (The)	R Emery				
63	Hydrophobie (or The Skipper and Quaker)	R Emery				
64	Keelman and the Grindstone (The)	Armstrong				
65	Newcastle Wonders (or Hackney Coach Customers)	R Emery				
66	Quayside Ditty (for February 1816)					
69	Shields Soliloquy (A)					
70	Green-Wives' Lamentation (The)					
71	Petition (A) (From the Women of the Vegetable Market to the Mayor of Newcastle)					
71	Fish-Wives' Complaint (The) (on Their Removal from Sandhill to the New Fish Market on 2 January 1826)	R Emery				
72	Sunderland Jammy's Lamentation (December 1831)					
73	Cobbler O' Morpeth (The) (Cholera Morbus)	John McLellan	Bow Wow		Fr-Tune1	
75	Canny Sheels	John Morrison				
76	Permanent Yeast	John Morrison				
77	Pitman's Ramble (The) (or Newcastle Finery)					
79	Coaly Tyne					
81	Newcassel Races	W Watson				
82	Quack Doctors (The)					
84	Peggy's Leg	H. R.				
85	Bonny Keel Laddie					
85	Tyne (The)	John Gibson				
86	Nanny of the Tyne	Gibson				
87	Bonny Gyetsiders (The)	J Shield	Bob Cranky			
89	Water of Tyne (The)					
89	Newcastle Signs (The)	Cecil Pitt		Sung at the Theatre-Royal, Newcastle by Mr Scriven, 4 June 1806		
91	Wonderful Gutter (The)	Wm Midford				
92	Local Militia-Man (The)	Wm Midford	Madam Fag's Gala			
94	Masquerade at Newcastle Theatre (or The Pitman Turned Critic)	Wm Midford				
96	Nancy Wilkinson	H Robson				
97	Green's Balloon		Barbara Bell			
99	Newgate Street Petition (The) (To Mr Mayor)					
101	Burdon's Address To His Cavalry (A Parody)	Jas Morrison				
102	Collier's Keek at the Nation (The)	R Gilchrist				
104	Blind Willie Singing	R Gilchrist				
105	Bold Archy & Blind Willie's Lament (On The Death of Captain Starkey)	R Gilchrist				
107	Voyage To Lunnin (A)	R Gilchrist				
110	Newcassel Props (The)	Oliver				
111	Newcassel Wonders					
112	Tim Tunbelly	Oliver	Canny Newcassel			
114	Keel Row (The)	T Thompson				
115	Barber's News (The) (or Shields in an Uproar)	J Shield				
119	Bonassus (The)	Oliver	Jemmy Joneson's Whurry			
120	Shield's Chain Bridge (Humorously Described by a Pitman)	Oliver		note archaic spelling of Humorously		
122	Colliers' Pay Week (The)	Henry Robson				
128	Tyne (The)	Henry Robson		Written in 1807		
129	Spring (The)	Henry Robson		Written early in May 1809		
129	Parson Malthus	H Robson	Ranting Roaring Willie	Written in 1826 (not in index)		
131	Peter Waggy	Henry Robson		Written in 1826		
132	Bessy of Blyth (A Virtuous Woman is More Precious Than Rubies)	H Robson		Written in 1826		
132	Kelvin Grove – The Lassie's Answer	Henry Robson		Written in 1827		
133	Peter Watson (To Mr) – (Who lays powerful bats on the knaves with fire-shovel hats on)	Henry Robson		Written in 1824		
133	a mention of	Peter Watson		Opposed the claims of the Government Clergy for the Easter Dues or "Clerical Tax"		
135	Newcastle Subscription Mill (The)	H Robson	Newcastle Ale	1814		
136	Lizzie Liberty	Henry Robson	Tibby Fowler i' the Glen			
137	New Fish Marret (The)	William Midford	Scot's Come O'er The Border	Fish Market		
138	New Year's Carol (A) (For the Fishwives of Newcastle)	M Ross	Chevy Chase			
139	Jesmond Mill	Phill "Primrose" Hodgson		also "Phill" and "Primrose"		
140	Tommy Thompson	Robert Gilchrist		a tribute to T.T.		
140	Farewell to the Tyne	Robert Gilchrist				
141	Northumberland Free O' Newcastle	Robert Gilchrist		On the Duke of Northumberland being given the freedom of Newcastle		
142	Dutchess And Mayoress (The)			Written in Sept 1819		
144	Newcastle Assizes (Dutchess verses Mayoress)			(or A Struggle For Precedence)		
146	Coal Trade (The)					
148	Tom Carr And Waller Watson (or Tom And Jerry at Home)	Oliver	There Was A Bold Dragoon			
150	Johhny Sc-tt And Tommy C-rr – A Dialogue					
151	Tommy C-rr in Limbo	Oliver	Scots Wha Ha'e			
152	Kitty Port Admiral at the Bench (The) (or Dogberry in the Suds)		The Opera Hat			
153	Owl (The)	R Emery	X. Y. Z.	Written Feb 1826		
155	Lovely Delia		Sleeping Maggie			
156	Pandon Dene		The Banks O' Doon			
157	Newcastle Hackneys (The)					
158	Newcastle Hackney Coaches	Oliver	The Bold Dragoon			
159	Newcastle Improvements	R. Charlton	Canny Newcassel			
160	Come Up to the Scratch (or The Pitman Haggish'd)	R Emery	Calder Fair			
162	Piman's Dream (The) (or A Description of the North Pole)	R Emery	Newcastle Fair			
164	Piman's Dream (The) (or His Description of the Kitchen)	R Emery	Hell's Kitchen			
166	Famed Filly Fair (or A Peep into Pilgrim Street)					
168	T—lly's Best Blood (A North Shields Song)			Written in 1820		
168	Newcastle Noodles (The)	James Morrison				
170	British Justice (or Newcastle Privy Court)					
172	Misfortunes of Roger & His Wife (The)	J. B.	Calder Fair	This could be Joshua L. Bagnall		
173	Newcastle Theatre in an Uproar					
175	Farewell Archy		Chapter of Donkeys	Written in 1820		
176	Sir Tommy Made An Odd Fellow	R Gilchrist				
178	Wreckenton Hiring					
180	On Russel The Pedestrian	Russell the pedestrian				
180	Short bio	George Wilson		Blackheath Pedestrian		
180	Short bio	John Simpson		Cumberland Pedestrian		
181	On Simpson The Pedestrian's Failure		Barbary Bell			
182	Victory (The) (or The Captain Done Over)		O The Golden Days of Good Queen Bess			
184	Alarm (The) (or Lord Fauconburg's March)		Chevy Chase			
185	a mention of			The Shields riots of 1793		
186	Half-Drowned Skippy (The)		Chapter of Donkeys			
187	Newcastle Worthies (The)	Wm Armstrong	We've Aye Been Provided For			
189	PART II	Humanum Est Errare				
189	Old Nick's Visit To H---'s Kitchen		The King of The Cannibal Islands			
191	PART III	On George the Fourth's Coronation				
191	Invitation to the Mansion House Dinner	Armstrong	Scot's Wha Ha'e Wi' Wallace Bled	(In honour of the Coronation)		
191	Newcastle Swineherd's Proclamation (The)			(not in index)		
193	Golden Horns (The) (or The General Invitation)					
194	Loyal Festivities (or Novel Scenes in Newcastle)			Sung by the "Swinish Multitude" in full chorus on Thursday 19 July 1821		
196	Picture of Newcastle (or George the Fourth's Coronation)	William Midford	Arthur McBride			
198	Newcastle in an Uproar (or George the Fourth's Coronation)	W Midford	Come Under My Plaidie			
201	Coronation Day at Newcastle					
203	Coronation Thursday – 19 July 1821	W Midford		The Third Epistle From Bob Fudge to his cousin Bob in the country		
203	a mention of			The 1st and 2nd Epistles		
209	PART IV	Continuation of general songs				
209	Bob Fudge's Postscript (to his account of the Great Town Moor Meeting Mon 11 Oct 1819)					
210	Blind Willy's Flight	R Emery	Betsey Baker			
211	New Markets (The)	Oliver	Canny Newcastle			
212	Changes on the Tyne (The)		Mitford Galloway			
216	PART V	On The Attempt To Remove The Custom House From Newcastle To Shields in 1816				
216	Custom House Branch (The)					
217	Custom House Tree, &c (The)		The Quayside Shaver			
218	Custom House Branch (The)		Yo Heave O			
221	PART VI	Continuation of general songs				
221	Mechanic's Procession (The) (or A Trip To South Shields)	R Emery	The Bold Dragoon			
223	Gipsy's Song (A)	H Robson				
224	The piper, Sandy Brown (correct title unknown) – Extract from	unknown		Extract from a poem appearing in a Kelso newspaper c1795		
225	Verses Written for the Burns Club	H Robson		Held at Mr Wallace's "Nags Head", Newcastle Jan 1817		
227	Parody Written on Hearing A Report That The Newcastle And Northumberland Yeomanry Cavalry Were To Be Disbanded (A)	William Greig	The Soldiers Tear			
228	Thomas Whittell, His Humorous Letter To Good Master Moody, Razor Setter					
229	Natural Philosopher (The) (or The Downfall of Learned Humbugs)		Canny Newcassel			
230	Gateshead Rads (The)		to an old tune			
232	Election Day (The)	W Watson	There's One Luck About The House			
233	Mary Drew	The late Thomas Houston				
233	Short bio	The late Thomas Houston				
235	Opening of the New Markets					
236	New Markets (The) (or Newcastle Improvements)	Midford				
238	More Innovations	R Gilchrist				
239	Humble Petition of the Old House in Shieldfields (The) – To John Clayton Esq	R Gilchrist				
241	Euphy's Coronation	Thomas Marshall	Arthur McBride			
243	Sandgate Wife's Nurse Song	Nunn	A Sailor's Wife Has Nought To Dee			
244	Bold Jack of the Journal	H. R.		Newcastle Sept 1836		
244	Steam Soup (or Cuckoo Jack's Petition)	R Emery	X. Y. Z.			
246	Sandgate Lass on the Ropery Bank (The)	Nunn	The Skipper's Wedding			
247	Old And Curious Song (An) (On The Late Mr R Clayton Being Made An Alderman)	Mr James Davison	The Vicar And Moses			
249	Short bio	Mr James Davison				
249	Newcastle Landlords 1834	W Watson				
252	New Song For Barge-Day 1835 (A)	Robert Gilchrist		Sung on board of the Steward's Steam-boat		
254	St. Nicholas' Church	Nunn				
256	Paganini The Fiddler (or The Pitman's Frolic)	R Emery	The Kebbuckstane Wedding			
257	Oyster-Wife's Petition (The) (or The Removal of the Oyster-Tub From The Quay)	R Emery	The Bold Dragoon			
259	Broom Busoms					
259	Extra verses to the last song Written by Blind Willie	Blind Willie				
260	Thumping Luck	W Watson	Gang Nae Mair To Yon Town			
261	Dance To Thy Daddy	W Watson	The Little Fishy			
263	Friar and the Nun (The)			A midnight colloquy of the Nun's Field		
264	St. Nicholas' Great Bell					
265	Lukey's Dream		Caller Fair			
267	Jocker	Nunn	O? Gin I Had Her			
269	Corn Market (The) – A Lament		The Bold Dragoon			
271	Skipper's Account of the Mechanic's Procession (The)	R Emery		(R Emery of the Nelson Lodge, Newcastle)		
272	Drucken Bella Roy O		Duncan McCallaghan			
274	Bonny Clock Fyece (The)		The Coal-Hole			
275	Music Hall (The)					
277	Tyne (The)	Joe Wilson	Banks and Braes O' Bonny Doon			
278	Newcastle Old Country Gentleman (The)		Old Country Gentleman			
278	Unnamed song about the Tyne		The Keel Row	(not in index)		
279	Walker Pits		Off She Goes			
280	Beggar's Wedding		Quayside Shaver			
281	Do Li A			Sung in Newcastle about 1792-3-4		
281	South Shields Song (A)					
282	North Shields Song (A)					
282	Commit No Nonsense					
283	New Nursery rhyme (A)					
285	Cookson's Alkali					
286	Pitman's Ramble (The)	R Emery	The Kebbuckstane Wedding			
288	Worthy Rector (The) (Sung at a Farewell Dinner Given By His Parishioners)					
290	Battle of Spitaloo					
291	Battle on the Shields Railway (Between A Town Councillor and an Architect and the Pollis)		Cappy's The Dog			
294	Blind Willie's Death		Jemmy Joneson's Whurry	Died 26 July 1832		
296	Geordy's Disaster			(not in index)		
297	Jossy's Nag's Head		A Rampant Lion Is My Sign			
299	April Gowk (The) (or The Lover's Alarmed)		Jenny Choak'd The Bairn	referred to as "A Castle-Garth Ditty"		
301	Skipper's Mistake (The)	Armstrong	A Chapter of Accidents			
303	Newcastle Beer versus Spaw Water (or The Pitman And Temperance Society)	R Emery	Mr Frost			
304	Pitman's Pay (The) (or A Night's Discharge To Care)	Thomas Wilson				
316	Newcastle Blunderbuss (The) (or Travelling Extraordinary)	R Emery	Calder Fair			
317	Pitman's Visit To Newcastle on Valentine's Day (A)		Newcastle Fair			
319	Skipper in the Mist (The)	Armstrong	Derry Down			
321	Miraculous Well (The) (or Newcastle Spaw Water)	R Emery	Rory O' More			
321	a mention of			The alleged spring in Sandyford Dene		
322	Skipper's Fright (The)	"J. N." – but Index attributes it to "Bailey"	Skipper Carr And Marky Dunn			
324	Sandgate Pant (or Jane Jemieson's Ghost)	R Emery	I'd Be A Butterfly			
325	Birthday of Queen Victoria (The)	R Gilchrist		intended to be sung on Ascension Day 24 May 1838		
326	Donocht Head	The late George Pickering of Newcastle				
327	Herbage Committee (The)	R Gilchrist		The 'Jewel' of a committee		
328	Bear Club (The)	R Gilchrist				
329	Lass of Wincomblee (The)		Nae Luck About The House			
330	Death of Bold Archy (On The)	R Gilchrist				
331	Blind Willie's Epitaph	R Gilchrist				
332	Acrostic _ on the Death of Blind Willie	R Emery				
332	short bio	Blind Willie				

== John Simpson the pedestrian ==
John Simpson (lived c.1822) the pedestrian was a Cumbrian competitive walker/athlete.

Simpson was a Cumbrian character who was referenced in The Tyne Songster published in 1840, in the song "On Russell The Pedestrian". While not written in a Geordie dialect, it has a strong Northern connection. The notes to the song mention that Russell walked 101 miles in 23 hours, 56 minutes and 30 seconds on 25 and 26 June 1822 on Newcastle Racecourse.

On Whit Monday, and again on 29 and 30 July 1822, Simpson attempted to walk 96 miles, but failed in both attempts.

== Russell the pedestrian ==
Russell the pedestrian, who (lived c1822) was a Newcastle character who was mentioned on page 180 by W & T Fordyce (publishers) in The Tyne Songster published in 1840, in the song "On Russell The Pedestrian" written in his honour. It is not written in a Geordie dialect, but has a strong Northern connection.

The song is a tribute to Mr Russell who walked 101 miles in 23 hours, 56 minutes and 30 seconds on 25 and 26 June 1822 on Newcastle Racecourse.

== See also ==
Geordie dialect words
W & T Fordyce (publishers)

=== Notes ===
Fr-Tune1 – according to J. P. Robson's Songs of the Bards of the Tyne (Newcastle: France,[1849]) the tune is "Bow Wow".
