= William Greig (songwriter) =

William Greig (lived c.1812) was a Newcastle songwriter, who, according to The Tyne Songster, published in 1840 by W & T Fordyce, wrote the song "A Parody Written On Hearing A Report That The Newcastle And Northumberland Yeomanry Cavalry Were To Be Disbanded".

The song is sung to the tune of "The Soldiers Tear". It is not written in Geordie dialect but is definitely local to Newcastle.

The same song appears in Songs of the Bards of the Tyne, published by P. France & Co. in 1840. The work appears on page 161 of this book edited by Joseph Philip Robson.
