= William Watson (songwriter) =

William Watson (1796–1840) was a Tyneside concert hall singer and songwriter in the early 19th century. His most famous song is "Dance To Thy Daddy".

== Early life ==
‘'’William Watson'’’ was born in 1796. He was a political activist, who, at election times, turned his poetical abilities to writing election songs, etc. to aid the candidates of his choice.

The initial information seemed to point to him having been a shoemaker by profession, but a letter printed in the Gazette stated that this was untrue (see family and business details). At one time he lived in the Groat Market, Newcastle.

He was very popular as a singer and songwriter, and had started his own company, but this failed. So in c1823 he sailed for London. In 1826 he wrote to his brother Nathaniel informing him that he had also sent a parcel of manuscripts and asking Nathanial to arrange to have them printed. He adds that several of the songs have been well received when he had sung them in the capital. There is no evidence of these being published as a song book of his own compositions, but some of his songs appeared in composite collections of mixed songwriters. His "Newcastle Races" appeared in John Marshall's "A Collection of Songs, Comic, Satirical, and Descriptive" of 1827, the remainder in Fordyce's Newcastle Song Book, or, Tyne-side Songster" of 1842.

== Family and business details ==
An item appeared in the Evening Chronicle in 1885 in which the words to the song "Dance to thy Daddy" appeared together with a brief details of William Watson, including the fact that he had been a shoemaker. In response, the newspaper received, and printed a letter dated 23 November 1885, from a Mr John Brown, a previous works colleague of Watson, clearing up a few points. These included:

He was not a shoemaker, but a fellow-painter and decorator working for John Richardson, painter, of 29 St. Nicholas' Churchyard, Newcastle.

He was in London previous to that, and wrote the song of 'Thumping Luck', but became homesick and returned to Newcastle

He returned to Newcastle in the ship "The Barefoot", a London trader, c1829 or 1830

He remained in the above shop until after the date mentioned in the newspaper article, 1840.

He lived in St. Martin's Court, Newgate Street, Newcastle.

He was a first class tradesman, kind and genial nature.

His brother John was a very talented engraver on glass. His works include local views, such as St. Nicholas' Church, some of which he exhibited in the two Polytechnic Exhibitions held in Newcastle.

His youngest brother, Nathaniel was a hairdresser, but also a great musician, and a flute player.

== Later life ==
William Watson died at his home in St. Martin's Court, Newgate Street, Newcastle on 4 February 1840, aged forty-four years, and was buried in St John's Churchyard, but his grave appears to be unmarked.

== Works ==
These include :-

- Dance To Thy Daddy
- Thumping Luck to yon Town – most likely written in London
- Newcassel Races
- Newcastle Landlords – (from 1834)
- The Election Day

== See also ==
Geordie dialect words
P. France & Co.
France's Songs of the Bards of the Tyne - 1850
John Ross
The Songs of the Tyne by Ross
