= T Kennedy (songwriter) =

T Kennedy was a Tyneside songwriter from the late eighteenth and early nineteenth century. His most famous song is possibly "Geordie's Letter Frae Callerforney ".

== Details ==
The four most popular or best known songs written by T Kennedy are :-

- Geordie's Letter Frae Callerforney
- The Lass I Lo'e Sae Dearly
- The Moderate Man
- Sweet Tyneside

All of which appear in Songs of the Bards of the Tyne, published by P. France & Co. of Newcastle in 1840 and edited by Joseph Philip Robson.

Three of the above songs are written in the Geordie dialect

These and other minor works also appear in other Tyneside published Chapbooks from the same period including J. W. Swanston’s (of St. Andrew's Street, Newcastle upon Tyne) "Tyneside songster, containing a splendid collection of local songs by popular authors in the Northumbrian dialect"

== See also ==
- Geordie dialect words
- France's Songs of the Bards of the Tyne - 1850
- P. France & Co.
- Joseph Philip Robson
- The Tyneside Songster by J W Swanston
