= John Gibson (songwriter) =

John Gibson of Newcastle (lived c. 1812) was a Tyneside poet/songwriter. According to the information given by John Bell, his Rhymes of Northern Bards published in 1812 has the short song (or poem) "The Tyne" attributed to "J Gibson". The song appears on pages 11 and 12 and is not written in Geordie dialect.

The same song, "The Tyne" appears again on page 85 of The Tyne Songster, published by W & T Fordyce of Newcastle in 1840; under the name of "John Gibson."

Another song, "Nanny of the Tyne" appears in The Tyne Songster, 1840, attributed to "Gibson" (with no Christian name). This same song appears on page 17 of Volume 7 of The Songs of the Tyne produced by John Ross c. 1846, but it is not attributed there to any writer. According to the information given by Bell in his Rhymes of Northern Bards published in 1812, "Nanny of the Tyne" is attributed to J. M. Wedderburn and was set to music by J. Aldridge (Junior) of Newcastle.

Nothing more appears to be known of this person, or about his life.
