= B Crow =

B Crow (lived c1850) was a Tyneside songwriter who according to the information given by John Ross in volume 10 of his The Songs of the Tyne published c1850, has the short song “The Old Burn” attributed to his name. The song is sung to the tune of “My ain fireside.”

Songs also written by B. Crow and appearing in France's Songs of the Bards of the Tyne are :-

- Oh Tell me not the other Lands (to the tune of "Lucy Neal")
- Tell it not in Gath (to the tune of "Caller Fair")
- and also - The Old Burn

== See also ==
- Geordie dialect words
- The Songs of the Tyne by Ross
- P. France & Co.
- France's Songs of the Bards of the Tyne - 1850
