= Peter Watson (shoemaker) =

Peter Watson lived in Chester-le-Street, County Durham, England, ca. 1824, and was a shoemaker by trade.

Watson was a character who was mentioned on page 133 by W & T Fordyce (publishers) in The Tyne Songster published in 1840, in the song "To Mr. Peter Watson – (Who lays powerful bats on the knaves with fire-shovel hats on)", written by Henry Robson in Watson's honour. It is not written in a Geordie dialect, but has a strong Northern connection.

For centuries, the Government Clergy (i.e. Rector, vicar, or perpetual curate etc.) had the right to collect from each household in a Parish, "Easter Dues". This was based on a set sum (in the early/middle nineteenth century it was at the rate of 4p per person), and the head of the household had the duty to pay this sum on behalf of every member resident in the property of the age of 16 or more.

Peter Watson objected to this compulsory payment reasoning that "the claims were founded neither in the law or in the gospels", and was duly summons (and jailed for a short time for non-payment) before the court judged that the collection of these under the Acts of William III were illegal, ruling that "This act, or anything herein contained, shall not extend to any tythes, offerings, payments or oblations shall not extend….. …within any city or town where the same are settled by Act of Parliament" It is therefore the British public who are indebted to him for the removal of this "odious, unjust and oppressive clerical tax".

Nothing more appears to be known of this person, or his life.

== See also ==
- Geordie dialect words
