= James Davison (poet/songwriter) =

James Davison (lived c.1800) was a Tyneside attorney, poet and songwriter.

== Details ==
Davison (who lived in the late eighteenth or early nineteenth century) was a Tyneside songwriter, and, according to the information given by W & T Fordyce (publishers) in “The Tyne Songster” published in 1840, has the song "An Old And Curious Song (On The Late Mr R Clayton Being Made An Alderman)" attributed to his name.

The song is sung to the tune of "The Vicar And Moses". It is not written in Geordie dialect but definitely local to Newcastle). It was supposedly written after the resignation of Sir Matthew White-Ridley, a local magistrate, who resigned his office c1795 stating 'Clayton upstairs, Clayton downstairs will never do'

The song was first printed as a chapbook by Mrs Angus around 1795.

According to Fordyce, Davidson was an attorney and also penned the poem "Despair in Love, an imprecatory Prayer", which was also printed by Mrs Angus.

Nothing more appears to be known of this person, or their life.

== See also ==
- Geordie dialect words
- W & T Fordyce (publishers)
- The Tyne Songster by W & T Fordyce - 1840
