= John McLellan (songwriter) =

Songwriter from Tyneside, England, early 1800s

John McLellan, who lived in the early 19th century, was a Tyneside poet and songwriter. He is thought to have written a dialect song that draws on the cholera outbreaks of the 1830s.

== Cholera song ==
According to information published in 1840, McLellan wrote the song "Cobbler o' Morpeth", subtitled "Cholera Morbus". "Cobbler" was a slang term used for the dread disease of cholera.

There was a strong cholera epidemic in 1831–1832 and further outbreaks in 1848–1849 and 1853. The last led to 1,533 deaths in Newcastle, despite the opening of emergency hospitals, closure of public institutions such as theatres, quarantining of ships, cleansing streets with fire-engine hoses, excluding bodies from places of worship, and requiring graves to be at least six foot deep.

The song, without comment except the author's name, reappeared in 1850 and was sung to the tune of "Bow Wow". The text is in Geordie dialect.

== See also ==
- Geordie dialect words
- The Tyne Songster (W & T Fordyce, 1840)
- W & T Fordyce (publishers)
- France's Songs of the Bards of the Tyne - 1850
