= T. Jackson (songwriter) =

T. Jackson was an early eighteenth century Tyneside songwriter, who, according to the information given by P. France & Co. in his France's Songs of the Bards of the Tyne - 1850, published in 1850, has the song "The 'Prentice's Ramble to the Races - or the House of Correction" attributed to his name.

The song is sung to the tune of "Baggy Nanny", it is written in Geordie dialect and definitely has a strong Northern connection

The song itself shows how the "master and worker" relationship of that day worked; where the apprentice was bound to the employer, and must do as instructed- but in return received a sound teaching of the trade. In this case the apprentice missed work to visit the Newcastle races on the Town Moor, despite being forbidden to do so by his indentures, and as a punishment was sent to "the house of correction", i.e. prison.

Nothing more appears to be known of this person, or their life, not even their Christian name or sex.

== See also ==
- France's Songs of the Bards of the Tyne - 1850
- Geordie dialect words
