= R. Charlton (poet/songwriter) =

R. Charlton, who lived in the early nineteenth century, was a Tyneside poet/songwriter.

== Details ==
R. Charlton (lived ca. 1812) was a Tyneside songwriter, who, according to the information given by Thomas Allan in Allan's Illustrated Edition of Tyneside Songs published in 1891, has the song "Newcastle Improvements" attributed to his name.

The song is sung to the tune of "Canny Newcassel" according to W & T Fordyce. It is written in Geordie dialect and has a strong Northern connection. Unlike the others songwriters who wrote about the town improvements and mentioned changes to layout, street plans, new buildings etc., Charlton concentrated on the social changes brought about by the work, and sometimes not too kindly.

The same song without any comment, except the author's name, appears on page 159 of The Tyne Songster published by W & T Fordyce published in 1840 and on page 151 of A Collection of Songs, Comic, Satirical, and Descriptive published by Thomas Marshall published in 1829

Nothing more appears to be known of this person, or their life, or even their Christian name or sex.

== See also ==
- (Geordie) Rhymes of Northern Bards by John Bell Junior
- John Bell (folk music)
