= Thomas Houston =

Thomas Houston (c. 1777 – 27 December 1803) was a poet/songwriter from Tyneside. He was born in Ireland.

== Brief details ==
Houston was a Tyneside based poet/songwriter, who, according to the information given by W & T Fordyce (publishers) on page 233 in The Tyne Songster published in 1840, has the poem or song "Mary Drew" attributed to his name. He was a native of Ireland and was, by trade, a brassfounder.

In a brief biography in the same book, he is also credited with writing a play "The Term-day, or Unjust Steward" and several poems, odes and songs including "The progress of Madness" and "A Race to Hell", the latter portraying two notorious characters infamous in Newcastle at the time.

An entry in "Local Records or Historical Register of Remarkable Events Volume 2", edited by John Sykes (and Thomas Fordyce) published in 1833, appears under "1803 - December 27 - " and states "Died in the Infirmary at Newcastle, Thomas Houston, brass founder, aged 26 years... He was interred in the burial ground belonging to the Infirmary"

== See also ==
- Geordie dialect words
- The Tyne Songster (W & T Fordyce, 1840)
- W & T Fordyce (publishers)
