= Thomas Binney =

English Congregationalist divine (1798–1874)

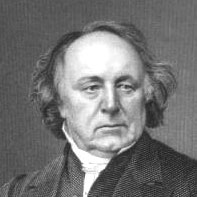
- Born: 1798; Newcastle upon Tyne
- Died: 24 February 1874 (aged 75–76)

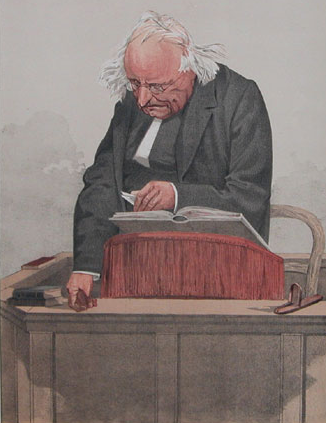
Thomas Binney, from Vanity Fair, 1872

Thomas Binney (1798–1874) was an English Congregationalist divine of the 19th century, popularly known as the "Archbishop of Nonconformity". He was noted for sermons and writings in defence of the principles of Nonconformity, for devotional verse, and for involvement in the cause of anti-slavery.

== Biography ==
Binney was born of Presbyterian parents at Newcastle upon Tyne in 1798, and educated at an ordinary day school. He spent seven years in the employment of George Angus, bookseller and printer of The Side, Newcastle. A fellow apprentice, Robert Emery wrote his song about "The Great Frost on the River Tyne" which had caused the River Tyne to freeze over during January and February 1814; Binney is credited by Thomas Allan, in his Illustrated Edition of Tyneside Songs and Readings with finishing off the song. After his time with the bookseller, he entered the theological school of Wymondley College, Hertfordshire.

In 1829, after short pastorates at Bedford (New Meeting) and Newport, Isle of Wight, he accepted a call to the historic King's Weigh House Chapel, London in succession to the elder John Clayton. Here he became very popular, and it was found necessary to build a much larger chapel on Fish Street Hill, to which the congregation removed. Its eminent members included Samuel Morley MP as well as William Hone and members of his family.

Binney laid the foundation stone of the new chapel himself, in 1834. An address delivered on the occasion of the laying of the foundation stone, published with an appendix containing a strong attack on the influence of the Church of England, gave rise to a long and bitter controversy. Throughout his career Binney was a vigorous opponent of the state church principle, though he maintained friendly relations with many of the dignitaries of the Established Church. From 1865 to 1869, Llewelyn David Bevan assisted Binney at the King's Weigh House.

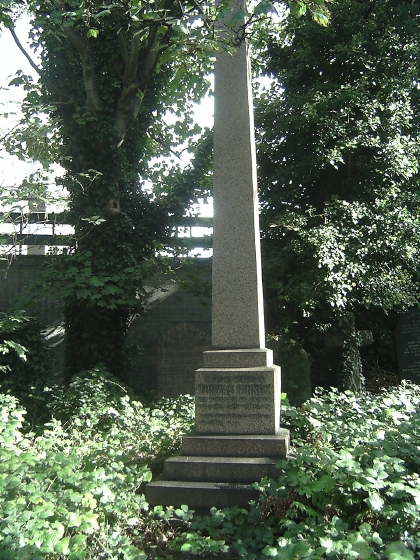
Thomas Binney's memorial at the nondenominational Abney Park Cemetery, 2006

His liberality of view and breadth of ecclesiastical sympathy entitle him to rank, on questions of Nonconformity, among the most distinguished of the school of Richard Baxter. Indeed, he became known as "the Archbishop of Nonconformity".

Binney was an active member of the British and Foreign Anti-Slavery Society, formed in 1839. A painting at the National Portrait Gallery in London, The Anti-slavery Convention, 1840, depicts many of the key participants of the first World Anti-Slavery Convention, with Thomas Clarkson introducing the event chaired by Binney. In 1853, when the African-American abolitionist Samuel Ringgold Ward came to Britain to raise funds for the Anti-slavery Society of Canada, a time when there was a vast influx of escaped slaves from the United States seeking refuge in the British colony, he brought letters of introduction to Binney, planning to seek help initially from fellow Congregationalists in London such as Binney, James Sherman and Josiah Conder. Binney later became the biographer of Sir Thomas Fowell Buxton, a leading parliamentary abolitionist.

He continued to discharge the duties of the ministry until 1869, when he resigned. In 1845 he paid a visit to Canada and the United States, and in 1857–1859 to the Australian colonies. The University of Aberdeen conferred the LL.D. degree on him in 1852, and he was twice chairman of the Congregational Union of England and Wales.

Binney pioneered changes to the forms of service in Nonconformist churches, and gave a special impulse to congregational psalmody by the publication of a book entitled The Service of Song in the House of the Lord. Of numerous other works the best-known is his Is it Possible to Make the Best of Both Worlds?, an expansion of a lecture delivered to young men in Exeter Hall, which attained a circulation of 30,000 copies within a year of its publication. He wrote much devotional verse, including the well-known hymn "Eternal Light! Eternal Light!"

Binney preached his last sermon in November 1873. After some months of suffering, he died on 24 February 1874. Arthur Penrhyn Stanley assisted at his funeral service in Abney Park Cemetery, Stoke Newington, London, where his monument, a tall pink granite obelisk, can still be seen near to that of William Booth, close to Church Street.

== Books ==
Among his many books and numerous collections of sermons, published throughout his life, are:

- Binney, Thomas (1831). A study for young men or A Sketch of Sir Thomas Fowell Buxton. Boston: Crosby & Nichols.
- Binney, Thomas (1853). Is it Possible to Make the Best of Both Worlds?. London: James Nisbet & Co.
- Binney, Thomas (1864). Money: A Popular Exposition in Rough Notes ... London: Jackson, Walford, and Hodder.

== Sources ==
- Obituary in the Congregational Year Book 1875 pp. 313–317
- John Stoughton (1874). A memorial of ... Thomas Binney, ed. by J. Stoughton.
