= Phill "Primrose" Hodgson =

Tyneside songwriter

Phill Hodgson (lived c1772) was a Tyneside songwriter, who, according to the information given by John Bell in his Rhymes of Northern Bards published in 1812, has the short song "Jesmond Mill" attributed to his name.

The song is sung to the tune of "My Ain Fireside". It is not written in Geordie dialect but has a strong Northern connection

This song (originally named as "Jessamond Mill) had first appeared in 1772 in the "Ladies' Own Memorandum Book" published by S. Hodgson of Newcastle under the author's pen-name "Primrose".

Thomas Allan states that there are two other pieces in this same Ladies book attributed to "Primrose" one being named "Une Bagatelle" (in which appears a reference to "Jenny" which Allan poses may be the same "Jenny" as in "Jesmond Mill") but the other piece is not named.

The song, Jesmond Mill appears again on page 139 of The Tyne Songster, published by W & T Fordyce of Newcastle in 1840; under the name of “Phil. Hodgson”

Nothing more appears to be known of Phill Hodgson, or his life, or indeed whether the Phil/Phill/Primrose is a male or female Christian name.

== See also ==
Geordie dialect words

(Geordie) Rhymes of Northern Bards by John Bell Junior

The Tyne Songster (W & T Fordyce, 1840)
