= James Thomas Clephan =

British journalist (1804–1888)

James Clephan (1804–1888) was a British journalist, newspaper editor, antiquary, and poet.

== Life ==
James Thomas Clephan was born on 17 March 1804 in Monkwearmouth, Sunderland, the second son of Stockton baker Robert Clephan.

He was educated in Stockton, and he and his family were members of the Unitarian Church in Stockton. He later was a Trustee of the (Unitarian) Church of the Divine Unity in Newcastle upon Tyne.

He became indentured to Stockton printer, Mr. M. Eales. On completion of his Indentureship in 1825, he moved to Edinburgh (termed "The Modern Athens") and worked in the offices of the publishing company of Ballantine where he remained for almost three years, gaining valuable experience. At the end of this time in 1828, he accepted a sub-editorship at the Leicester Chronicle, and moved to Leicester. In 1838, the Whig-sympathetic Gateshead Observer required an editor and Clephan applied successfully for the post. He remained in this position for 22 years until he retired in 1860. The Gateshead Observer was a relatively new newspaper, the first in Gateshead, that became popular as a consequence of Clephan's directorship. Clephan Street in Gateshead bears his name to this day.

In 1858, Joseph Skipsey, who had the sobriquet "The Pitman Poet", published Poems in Morpeth, which attracted the attention of Clephan. When Skipsey told Clephan of his dire situation, Clephan obtained a job for him at Hawks, Crawshay and Sons ironworks in Gateshead.

He left the Gateshead Observer to become a freelance journalist, as which he worked primarily for the Newcastle Daily (and Weekly) Chronicles, for which he wrote regular articles on the historical past of the area, a column on the work of the Society of Antiquaries of Newcastle upon Tyne, and tributes to the departed local notables. He continued working until his eightieth birthday, after which he appears to have become bed-ridden. He died on 25 February 1888 and was buried in Jesmond Cemetery, Newcastle.

A picture of James is here https://searcharchives.vancouver.ca/studio-portrait-of-james-clephan-and-his-niece-mary-c-elgood

== Works ==
These include :-

=== Songs and poems ===
- Annette – see North Country Poets page 78
- The Memorial Flower – see North Country Poets page 79
- Good Night – see North Country Poets page 81

=== Books, papers and printed articles ===
- He wrote several articles which found their way into “The Monthly Chronicle of North-Country Lore and legend 1887”. These included
  - Over the Churchyard Wall, which first appeared in the Newcastle Weekly Chronicle in July 1885 (page 20) giving details of many of the better known occupants of the Old St. John's Graveyard, Newcastle
  - Jean Paul Marat in Newcastle (page 49)
  - Witchcraft in the North (page 211)
  - Early Printers on the Tyne (page 314)
  - Early Booksellers on the Tyne (page 362)
  - The Early Press of York (page 459)
  - plus several other articles in the same book
- Several articles appeared in "Archaeologia aeliana, or, Miscellaneous tracts relating to antiquity 1887", the journal of The Society of Antiquaries of Newcastle upon Tyne; including :-
  - The Bigg Market Military Execution, 1640: The Year of Newburn. (on page 112)
  - Old Tyne Bridge and its Story (on page 135)
  - Departure of the Quayside Wall; and what became of it (on page 210)

== See also ==
- Geordie dialect words
- Thomas Allan
- Allan's Illustrated Edition of Tyneside Songs and Readings
