= Robert Wilson (physician) =

Robert Wilson (1829?–1881) was a British physician. From Castle Eden, County Durham, he graduated M.D. from the University of Glasgow in 1848. He practiced in Alnwick, Northumberland, and died aged 52.

He produced a paper entitled "The Coal Miners of Durham and Northumberland: their Habits and Diseases". This paper was read at the Newcastle upon Tyne meeting of the British Association (Sub-section D), and printed in the Transactions of the Tyneside Naturalists Club, 1863-4, vol. VI, p. 200. It was also read at the British Association for the Advancement of Science, Annual Meeting held at Newcastle upon Tyne, August 1863, and reviewed at length in the British Medical Journal for 19 September 1863. It was an important paper, historically. It describes working and living conditions and practices and gives a brief insight into the structures of the mining industry at the time. It has been cited as evidence for the incidence of barrel chest. It has also been cited as evidence of a change in attitudes to the amelioration of the conditions in the mining community, after about 1850.
