= William Richardson (songwriter) =

William Richardson (lived c. 1812) was a Tyneside songwriter, who, according to the information given by John Bell in his Rhymes of Northern Bards published in 1812, has the poem or song "Hotspur, A Ballad - In the Manner of the Ancient Minstrels" attributed to his name.

The song is not written in Geordie dialect but has a strong Northern connection. Nothing more appears to be known of this person, or their life.
