= When the Boat Comes In (song) =

English folk song

"When the Boat Comes In" (or "Dance ti thy daddy") is a traditional English folk song, listed as 2439 in the Roud Folk Song Index. The popular version originates in Northumbria. An early source for the lyrics, Joseph Robson's "Songs of the bards of the Tyne", published 1849, can be found on the FARNE archive. In FARNE's notes to the song, it is stated that the lyrics were written by William Watson in about 1826.

It was popularised as the theme tune of the 1970s BBC drama serial When the Boat Comes In, in an arrangement by the composer David Fanshawe.

== Lyrics ==
There are two distinct sets of lyrics in popular culture for the song. The theme of the TV series of the same name, sung by Alex Glasgow, was released as a BBC single and uses the traditional lyrics. The songs represent a boy waiting for the boat to come in, dancing to his father, singing to his mother, eating a fish. The non-traditional lyrics describe him doing things while he ages: first singing and playing, next farming, finds a girl, becomes a father to a son, and sings to him of all he's done. This version was also used in a TV advertisement for Young's Seafood "Sea to Plate" campaign, and used the same lyrics as The Wiggles. The lyrics of the traditional version of the song, used in the TV series theme, differ significantly from those of the TV advertisement, talking of drinking alcohol.

Traditional version (From Farne)	Young's fish advertisement transcription
First verse
Come here, my little Jacky	Dance to your Daddy, my little laddie
Now I've smoked my backy	Dance to your Daddy, my little man
Let's have a bit cracky	Thou shalt have a fish and thou shalt have a fin
Till the boat comes in	Thou shalt have a codlin' when the boat comes in
Dance to thy daddy, sing to thy mammy,	Thou shalt have haddock baked in a pan
Dance to thy daddy, to thy mammy sing;	Dance to your Daddy, my little man
Thou shalt have a fishy on a little dishy,	Dance to your Daddy, my little laddie
Thou shalt have a fishy when the boat comes in.	Dance to your Daddy, my little laddie
	Dance to your Daddy, my little man
Second verse
Here's thy mother humming,	When thou art a young boy, you must sing and play,
Like a canny woman;	Go along the shore and cast your shells away,
Yonder comes thy father,	Build yourself a castle, watch the tide roll in,
Drunk, he cannot stand.	Dance to your Daddy, my little man.
Dance to thy daddy, sing ti' thy mammy,	Dance to your Daddy, my little laddie,
Dance to thy daddy, ti' thy mammy sing;	Dance to your Daddy, my little man,
Thou shalt have a fishy on a little dishy,
Thou shalt have a haddock when the boat comes in.
Third verse
Our Tommy's always fuddling,	When thou art a young man, go unto the trades,
He's so fond of ale,	Find yourself a skill, and wages you’ll be paid
But he's kind to me,	Then with all your wages, buy yourself some land
I hope he'll never fail.	Dance to your Daddy, my little man
Dance to thy daddy, sing ti' thy mammy,	Dance to your Daddy, my little laddie,
Dance to thy daddy, ti' thy mammy sing;	Dance to your Daddy, my little man,
Thou shalt have a fishy on a little dishy,
Thou shalt have a bloater when the boat comes in.
Fourth verse
I like a drop mysel',	When thou art a man and go to take a wife
When I can get it sly,	Find yourself a lass and love her all your life
And thou, my bonny bairn,	Find yourself a lass and love her all your life
Will lik't as well as I	Dance to your Daddy, my little man.
Dance to thy daddy, sing ti' thy mammy,	Dance to your Daddy, my little laddie,
Dance to thy daddy, ti' thy mammy sing;	Dance to your Daddy, my little man
Thou shalt have a fishy on a little dishy,
Thou shalt have a mackerel when the boat comes in.
Fifth verse
May we get a drop,	When thou art an old man, father to a son
Oft as we stand in need;	Sing to him the old songs, sing of all you've done
And weel may the keel row	Pass along the old ways, then let his song begin
That brings the bairns their bread.	Dance to your Daddy, my little man.
Dance to thy daddy, sing ti' thy mammy,	Dance to your Daddy, my little laddie,
Dance to thy daddy, ti' thy mammy sing;	Dance to your Daddy, my little man,
Thou shalt have a fishy on a little dishy,
Thou shalt have a salmon when the boat comes in.

== Other traditional versions ==
Jean Ritchie of Kentucky and Elizabeth Cronin of West Cork, Ireland were recorded by Alan Lomax on separate occasions singing versions of the song; Cronin's version can be heard online. Belle Stewart sang a version in Scottish Cant and English/Scots, which is available on the Tobar an Dualchais website.
