= William R. Walker (publisher) =

William R. Walker was a printer and publisher in 19th century Newcastle. His business was in the Royal Arcade, Newcastle.

He published several music chapbooks including The Songs of the Tyne, the second collection of that name, and consisting of 3 small volumes.

== See also ==
- Geordie dialect words
