= Hydrophobie (song) =

English folk song

"Hydrophobie (or “The Skippers and the Quaker)"

Song
- Language: English (Geordie)
- Written: c 1825
- Published: 1825
- Lyricist: Robert Emery

Hydrophobie (or sometimes called “The Skipper and the Quaker") is a Geordie folk song written in the 19th century by Robert Emery, in a style deriving from music hall.

This song tells the tale of a Keelman who is bitten by a dog. The keelman and his crew frighten a Quaker passenger by pretending the dog bite has caused hydrophobia.

== Lyrics ==
HYDROPHOBIE
also called “Skipper and the Quaker”
air “Air - The Cameronian's Rant," or "X,Y,Z", or “Good morrow to your night cap"

As Skipper Carr an' Markie Dunn
Was gannin', drunk, thro' Sandgate --
A dog bit Mark, an' off did run,
But sair the poor sowl fand it.
The Skipper, in a voice se rough --
Aw warn'd, says he, it's mad eneugh --
Howay and get some Doctor's stuff,
For fear of Hydrophobie !

Chorus
Fal de ral, &c.

Verse 2
The Doctor dress'd the wound se wide,
And left poor Markie smartin --
Then, for a joke, tells Carr, aside,
Mark wad gan mad, for sartin: --
Noo, Skipper, mind, when in yor keel,
Be sure that ye watch Markie weel,
If he begins to bark and squeel,
Depend It's Hydrophobie !

Chorus

Verse 3
For Shields next day they sail'd wi' coal,
And tyeuk on board a Quaker,
Who wish'd to go as far's Dent's Hole,
To see a friend call'd Baker.
The Skipper whisper'd in his ear,
Wor Markie will gan mad, aw fear!
He'll bite us a'--sure as yor here,
We'll get the Hydrophobie !

Chorus

Verse 4
Said Quack—I hope this can't be true,
Nay, friend, thou art mistaken;
We must not fear what man can do --
Yea! I will stand unshaken.
The Skipper, to complete the fun
Then told the Quaker what'd been done--
A dog'd bit Mark an'off did run
An' browt on Hydrophobie !

In the original version, these last four lines had been:-

The Skipper, to complete the farce
Said Maister Quaker what's far warse,
A b------g dog bit Markie's a--e,
And browt on Hydrophobie !

Chorus

Verse 5
Now Markie overheard their talk,
Thinks he—aw'll try the Quaker --
Makes P. D. to the huddock walk,
Of fun to be partaker :
To howl and bark he wasn't slack,
The Quaker ow'rboard in a crack,
With the fat Skipper on his back
For fear of Hydrophobie !

Chorus

Verse 6
Now P. D. laugh'd to see the two,
Who, to be sav'd, were striving --
Mark haul'd them out, wi' much ado,
And call'd them culls for diving : --
The Quaker seun was put on shore,
For he was frighten'd verry sore --
The Skipper promis'd never more
To mention Hydrophobie !

== Comments on variations to the above version ==
NOTE –
In the early 19th century, as today, there were cheap books and magazines.
Many of these “chapbooks” were on poor quality paper to a poor standard and with poor quality print. The works were copied with no thoughts of copyright, and the work required very little proof-reading, and what was done was not required to a high standard. Consequently, the dialect words of songs varied between editions.
As this was a very popular song, it appeared in numerous editions. The many versions published show considerable, some very minor, variations, mainly in the spelling of the words, and sometimes variations within the same edition. Some of the most common are listed below :-

Generally
a' and aw
aboard and on board
an' and
ashore and on shore
at and that
aw and aw's
call'd and called
dress'd and dresse'd
eneugh and enough
far's and far as
Howay and How-way
o'erboard, overboard and ow'rboard
oot and out
P. D. and Pee-Dee
sae, se and see
sav'd and saved
Shields and Shilds
som and some
soul and sowl
sure's and sure as
tells and towld
two and twe
verry and very
wi' and with
yor and yo'r

Specific differences
Verse 1 Line 4 may start with "And" or "But"
Verse 2 Line 6 may have the word "when" missed thus reading "in yor keel"
Verse 4 Line 6 was first modified to "Said -- Master Quaker what is far warse
Verse 4 Line 7 was first modified to "A butchers dog bit Markie's a--e"

== Recordings ==
To follow

== See also ==
Geordie dialect words
