= The Campbells Are Coming =

Scottish song

The Campbells are Coming!
For pipes and drums.

"The Campbells Are Coming" is a Scottish song associated with Clan Campbell.

The tune, a traditional Scottish air, is similar to "The Town of Inveraray" (Scottish Gaelic: "Baile Ionaraora") ("I was at a wedding in the town of Inveraray / Most wretched of weddings, with nothing but shellfish..."; (Scottish Gaelic: "Bha mi air banias am Baile IIonaraora / Banais na bochdainn 's gun oirr' ach am maorach...")) and other Scottish songs, but with these martial lyrics:

Chorus:

The Campbells are coming Ho-Ro, Ho-Ro!
The Campbells are coming Ho-Ro, Ho-Ro!
The Campbells are coming to bonnie Lochleven
The Campbells are coming Ho-Ro, Ho-Ro!

Verses:

Upon the Lomonds I lay, I lay,
Upon the Lomonds I lay, I lay,
I lookit down to bonnie Lochleven
And saw three perches play-hay-hay!

The Great Argyll he goes before,
He makes the cannons and guns to roar,
With sound o'trumpet, pipe and drum,
The Campbells are coming, Ho-Ro, Ho-Ro!

The Campbells they are a' in arms,
Their loyal faith and truth to show,
With banners rattling in the wind,
The Campbells are coming Ho-Ro, Ho-Ro!

The song was definitely extant by 1745 and perhaps much earlier. It may have been inspired by the war of the Jacobite rising of 1715 (John Campbell, 2nd Duke of Argyll was the loyalist war leader and many Scottish loyalists were Campbells); According to Lewis Winstock the tune accompanied the Scottish loyalist vanguard in the Jacobite war, and Robert Wodrow ascribes that name to one of the bagpipe tunes that accompanied Argyle's Highlanders entrance into Perth and Dundee.

Or it may have been concerned with earlier events around the deposing of Mary Queen of Scots. If so, "Lochleven" would presumably refer to Lochleven Castle where Mary Queen of Scots was imprisoned in 1567, and "Great Argyll" may refer to Archibald Campbell, 5th Earl of Argyll who attempted to rescue her.

The song is commonly attributed to Robert Burns, like many Scottish songs which are actually traditional or of unknown origin. Burns did write a version with some different verses, which he published in the Scots Musical Museum, a collection of Scottish folk songs (and some new songs) published between 1787 and 1803.
