= John Brodie Gilroy =

John Brodie Gilroy (1818–1853) was thought to be born on Tyneside. He was a part-time songwriter and full-time printing foreman.

== Life ==
John Brodie Gilroy was born in 1818, it is assumed in the Newcastle upon Tyne area of England. Very little is known of his life except what can be gleaned from Allen's 1891 book of Tyneside songs, which in turn comes from an article in the "Weekly Chronicle"

He was a well-read man and was employed as a foreman at Lambert's Printing Office in Grey Street, Newcastle. He was known as a "man of ready wit and great natural ability, warm-hearted and generous even beyond his means". He was also known for having a fiery temper and would say such extraordinary things when vexed or annoyed "that even the recipients of these blessings could not refrain from laughing". It was said that "few men led a more pure and sinless life than he".

John Brodie Gilroy died at the beginning of 1853 at thirty-five years of age and, eccentric to the last, was buried "at his request, with his trousers and boots on" at Westgate Hill Cemetery , Newcastle upon Tyne.

== Works ==
He was the author of the extremely popular song at the time called "The Noodle", possibly his only song.
In the early nineteenth century various volunteer forces were formed, among them the "Newcastle Volunteer Corps of Yeomanry". Many people considered that they were there to protect the "rich and privileged" and not the country against invasion. The populace showed their feelings by giving them the nickname "The Noodles" and the name seemed to stick. The song by Gilroy is one of a number of songs poking fun at these volunteers.

According to Allan's book, the street children would call after them:-
"Ye blue-tailed bumlor, cock-tailed tumlor,
Ye durnet gan te war."

One of the early appearances of "The Noodle" was in the collection "Songs of the Tyne; being a collection of popular local songs. No. 4" published by J. Ross Royal Arcade, Newcastle upon Tyne circa 1846. This book also contains some of the region's best-known traditional songs, including "The bonnie keel laddie" and "The Jenny Howlet"

Another appearance is in Allan's Illustrated Edition of Tyneside songs and readings with lives 1891.

== See also ==
Geordie dialect words
