= The Pitman's Happy Times =

English song

"The Pitman’s Happy Times"

Song
- Language: English (Geordie)
- Written: 1800s
- Songwriter(s): Joseph Philip Robson

The Pitman’s Happy Times is a Geordie folk song written in the 19th century by J.P.(Joseph Philip) Robson, known as "The bard af ths Tyne and minstrel of the Wear", in a style deriving from music hall.

== Lyrics ==
J.P.(Joseph Philip) Robson, was one of the most prolific of all the Geordie poets of the time. He was already known for his classical poetry before he was persuaded to write in dialect and write lyrics for songs. Many of the dialectic works make for a feast of dialect materials. The song was written in the middle of the 19th century. A note in the 1872 edition read, “Had this admirer of the 'good old times' lived at the present time (1872), when pitmen's wages are advancing 10 and 15 per cent, at a bound, he even must have doubted whether the past was better than the present”.

The lyrics are as follows:

Air - In the days when we went gipsying

When aw wes yung, maw collier lads,
Ne man cud happier be;
For wages was like sma' coals then,
An' cheps cud raise a spree.
Wor pay-neet cam' wiv drink an' dance,
Wor sweethearts luckt se fine;
An' lumps o' beef, an' dads o' duff,
Wes there for folks te dine,
An' then we spent sic merry neets,
For grum'lin' we had nyen;
But the times o' wor prosperity.
Will niver cum agyen.

Wor hooses then wes ower sma',
For ivery nuik was chock;
Wor drawers wes fair mahoginy,
An' se wes chairs an' clock.
Wor feather beds, and powls se fine,
Wes welcum te the seet;
A man work' d harder I' the day,
Wi' thinkin' o' th' neet.
Spice hinnies on the gurdle fizz'd;
Maw tee had rum in't then;
But the times o' wor prosperity
Can niver cum agyen.

Wor wives cud buy new shawls an' goons,
An' niver heed the price;
The spyed-yace ginnies went like smoke
Te myek wor' darlins nice.
The drapers used ne tickets then,
The country gowks te coax:
They got thereckly what was ax'd,
An' prais'd us collier folks.
The butcher meat was always best
When Kenton paid thor men;
But the days o' wor prosperity
Can niver cum agyen.

When aw gat wed-gox, what a row!
The blindin' brass aw spent:
Aw bowt new gloves an' ribbin's man,
For aw the folks aw kent.
At ivery yell hoose I' this toon,
We had a cocktail pot;
Wi' treatin' a' the company roond,
Maw kelter went like shot.
But smash! we had a merry neet,
Tho' fights we had but ten;
Thor wes sic times for collier lads-
They'll niver come agyen.

We didn't heed much lairnin' then,
We had ne time for skyul;
Pit laddies work'd for spendin's syek,
An' nyen wes thowt a fyul.
Noo, ivery bairn can read and write-
Extonishin' to me!
The varry dowpie on my lap
Can tell his A B C.
Sum folks geets reet, and sum gets wrang,
Biv lettin' buiks alyen;
But this aw'd sweer, ne time like mine
Can iver cum agyen.

== Recordings ==
- Megson recorded “The Pitman’s Happy Times” as part of the studio album entitled “Take Yourself A Wife” (Released on 29 September 2008 by EDJ records) – unfortunately it is not in dialect
- YouTube recording of The Pitman’s Happy Times, performed by Megson (an English folk duo composed of husband and wife Stu and Debbie Hanna, the name coming from the name of Debbie’s deceased dog)

== See also ==
Geordie dialect words
