= James Morrison (Geordie songwriter) =

Newcastle song writer

James Morrison (c. 1800 – post 1830) was a Newcastle songwriter in the early part of the 19th century. His best known song is probably "Burdon’s Address to his Cavalry".

== Life ==
James Morrison, born c. 1800 in Morrison's Court (now demolished), off Groat Market, Newcastle.

After completing his apprenticeship as a painter, he worked for some years as a Journeyman in Newcastle, before moving c1830 to Edinburgh, and from that date little is known of his life.
He was a nephew of the scholar Dr. Morrison, who, through hard work and self-teaching had risen from an Apprentice joiner to one of the most eminent scholars of his time.

== Works ==
- "Burdon's Address to His Cavalry", sung to the tune of "Scots Wha Hae", was published in Marshall's Chapbooks, 1823. It referred to the 1815 great sailors' strike at North Shields against which Thomas Burdon, Mayor of Newcastle and Lieutenant colonel of the Tyne Hussars, was sent to assist in keeping order. For his services he was knighted by the Prince Regent on 14 May 1816. The song appeared in "Songs of the Tyne", being a collection of popular local songs. Volume 9" published by J. Ross, Royal Arcade, Newcastle upon Tyne, c. 1846.
- "Newcastle Noodles" sung to the tune of "Canny Newcassel", was published by Marshall's in 1827. The Northumberland and Newcastle Volunteer Corps of Yeomanry was formed in December 1819 with Charles John Brandling Esq. as commander. And there was a possibility that this, and other Yeomanry, may be used against the populace in case of rioting, the radicals showed their derision by calling them "Noodles".
- "The Newcastle Hoax" (or "The Butler's Alarm"), published September 1818, is a song about a butler's attempts to stage a crime at the house of his employer.
- "Permanent yeast", published around 1821, is a story about an exploding bottle of yeast and the comic consequences for the owner.

== See also ==
Geordie dialect words
