= William Mitford (singer-songwriter) =

19th-century English singer-songwriter

William Mitford (1788–1851) was a Tyneside songwriter of the 19th century. His best known works are those about "Cappy, The Pitman's Dog" and "The Pitman's Courtship".

== Early life ==
William Mitford was born at Preston (which was a village close to North Shields) on 10 April 1788. His parents died when he was very young, and at the age of 3 or 4 his uncle brought him to Newcastle upon Tyne. He became a shoemaker's apprentice, possibly to the father of Willie Armstrong, and worked in Dean Street. The earliest record of William Mitford appears in the budget chapbook "Newcastle Songster" series in 1816.

Mitford went on to write songs that became well-known in the region. It is known that Mitford played the part of the bishop in the "Coronation" by The Cordwainers Company of Newcastle upon Tyne at The Freeman Hospital in Westgate, on the Festival of St. Crispin (the patron saints of cobblers, tanners, and leather workers) on 29 June 1823.

== Later life ==
Shortly after, he left the shoemaking trade and moved on to the licensed trade. He opened a public house, "The North Pole", on the edge of Castle Leazes, near to the Spital Tongues area of the city, and while there he wrote the song, named after the pub, and called "The North Pole". He would perform often in his own public house. He moved on from here to the "Tailor's Arms", which was more central at the head of "The Side". Mention of his being there was made in 1834 by William Watson.

Eventually Mitford retired, and lived in Oyster Shell Lane (close to Bath lane). He died there on 3 March 1851 at the age of 63. He was buried in Westgate Hill General Cemetery, Arthur's Hill, Newcastle upon Tyne.

== Works ==
He wrote about Bob Cranky, a character described as a braggart, while in his 20s.

This material includes:

- The Pitman's Courtship – a well-known traditional song from the region. One of only a handful of Tyneside songs to be appreciated outside the region in its day
- Cappy (The Pitman's Dog)
- XYZ
- The North Pole
- The New Fish Market – A Protest song before protest songs were invented – When Richard Grainger the Architect set out his ideas for redevelopment the centre of Newcastle upon Tyne which would involve the demolition and re-building and re-siting of many old buildings including the Old Fish Market. William Mitford put down his concerns in song: “Where's the wee shop that once held Jack the Barber? Gone to make way for the fish brought to harbour"!

== A note on chapbooks ==
In the early 19th century, as today, there were cheap books and magazines.

Many of these “chapbooks” were on poor quality paper to a poor standard and with poor quality print. The works were copied with no thoughts of copyright, and the work required very little proof-reading, and what was done was not required to a high standard. Consequently, the dialect words of songs varied between editions. The books were produced in bulk, at very little cost, and provided a good income for the producers. They reflected popular taste, and were sold, usually for a penny (or less). Newcastle was during this period the second largest producer of chapbooks in the country. One such chapbook was the Newcastle Songster, Which containing in total 11 songs, and was published by J Marshall of the Old Flesh Market, with a cover which read :-

The Newcastle Songster, being a choice collection of songs, descriptive of the language and manners of the common people of Newcastle upon Tyne and the neighbourhood.
No pompous ftrains, nor labour’d lines are here,
But genuine wit and sportive mirth appear:
Northumbria’s genius in her simple rhymes,
Shall live an emblem to succeeding times.
Printed by J Marfhall, in the FlefhMarket where may also be had, a large and curious Affortment of Songs, Ballads, Tales, Hiftories, &c.

Another, dating from c 1846 was “Songs of the Tyne", a series printed by, John Ross of the Royal Arcade, Newcastle upon Tyne. Number 1 of the series refers to the building of the High Level Bridge, and therefore cannot be before 1846. A number of the songs, including "The pitman's courtship" date from the early 19th century

== Recordings ==
A recording of "The Pitman's Courtship" appeared on the CD Graeme Danby sings stories from the North East. "The Pitman's Courtship" was included in the CD Come you not from Newcastle? – Newcastle songs volume 1 – which is one of 20 CDs in the boxed set Northumbria Anthology

"The new fish market" also written by William Mitford – from the album Take Yourself a Wife – was sung by Megson (though not in dialect).

== See also ==
Geordie dialect words
