= Robert Emery (songwriter) =

Scottish songwriter (1794–1871)

Robert Emery (26 September 1794 – 28 March 1871) was a Tyneside songwriter, born in Edinburgh in Scotland. Possibly his best known work is "Hydrophobie" (sometimes called "The Skipper and the Quaker"), an example of Geordie dialect.

== Life ==
Robert Emery was born in Edinburgh on 26 September 1794. His family moved to Newcastle upon Tyne when he was young. He served his apprenticeship as a printer with Mr Angus, bookseller and printer, of The Side, Newcastle, and continued as a journeyman printer for many years in the town.

His early professional writing was of children's nursery rhymes for penny and halfpenny books. In 1814, he wrote the first two verses of a song about the great frost of 1813 with co-writer Thomas Binney.

He moved to Lamberts in Grey Street and whilst there, apparently wrote a song each year for his fellow work mates for their annual trip. He became self-employed, forming his own printing company about 1850, with premises in Silver Street, Newcastle upon Tyne. He continued here until about 1870 when he moved the larger premises at the foot of Pilgrim Street.

He died a year later, on 28 March 1871, at the age of 77. He was buried in All Saints' cemetery.

== Works ==
His works include –

- "Candlish forever!" (or "Uncle Neddy's advice to the editor of 'Bell's life'"). The tune is "The Campbells Are Coming"; the story is about James Candlish, one of the champion Tyne rowers circa 1850
- "Come up to the scratch!" (or "The pitman haggish'd")
- "Fishwife and mustaches" (or "Sandhill oratory"), a comic song about a fishwife and a Scottish colonel
- "Fish-wives' complaint" (on their removal from the Sandhill to the new fish market, on 2 January 1826)
- "Hydrophobie" (or "The Skipper and the Quaker")
- "The Newcastle Spaw" (or "Rory O’More")
- "Paganini, the Fiddler". This tells of the visit of a group of pitmen from Shiney Row to hear the great violinist Paganini. The pitmen are unimpressed by the performance.
- "The Pitman's Dream" (or "A description of The North Pole"). The tune is "Newcastle Fair".
- "The Pitman's Dream" (or "The description of the kitchen")
- "The Pitman's journey to Callerforney". The tune is "Old Dun Tucker". (In earlier publications this was called "The Pitman’s return to Callerforrney.")
- "The Pitman's surprise", a song about a pitman and his friend passing time during a pit layoff with a visit to the big town, Newcastle upon Tyne.
- "Sandgate pant" (or "Jane Jemieson's ghost"). The tune is "I'd be a Butterfly". It is a song about a keelman being frightened by the ghost of Jane Jemieson, a street vendor, executed on 7 March 1829 on Newcastle's Town Moor for the murder of her mother.
- "The Skipper's visit to the 'Polytechnic'". The tune is "X Y Z.", and describes the visit of a fictional keelboat skipper to the 1848 Polytechnic exhibition. It was printed on a chapbook type leaflet which was distributed as an advertisement for the event.

== Collections ==
His songs are included in many collections including :-

- Published 1825 - The booklet "Original Local Songs" by Edgar contained "Hydrophobie"
- Published in 1826 – "Newcastle songster; being a choice collection of songs, descriptive of the language and manners of the common people of Newcastle upon Tyne and the neighbourhood. Part VI, &c." by John Marshall
- Published 1927 – The book "A Collection of Songs, Comic, Satirical, and Descriptive, chiefly in the Newcastle Dialect - &c." by John Marshal lists Emery as one of a trio of local bards who break into song concerning the removal of the fishwives from the Sandhill.
- Published 1842 – "The Newcastle Song Book" – by William Fordyce - included Emery's "Sandgate Pant" (also known as "Jean Jamieson's Ghost")
- Published 1846 – "Songs of the Tyne; being a collection of popular local songs" – by J Ross
- Published c1849 – "Songs of the bards of the Tyne; or, a choice selection of original songs, chiefly in the Newcastle dialect. With a glossary of 800 words, &c." – by P. France & Co
- Published 1888 – "A Beuk o’ Newcassell Sangs- Collected by Joseph Crawhall"

== See also ==
- Geordie dialect words
