= Joseph Philip Robson =

Poet, songwriter, editor

Joseph Philip Robson (or J. P. Robson) (1808 – 1870) was a Tyneside poet and writer of the 19th century. His most famous works are The Pitman’s Happy Times and "The Pawnshop Bleezin'" a comic description of the reactions of the various customers to the pawnshop going up in flames. He was a contemporary of other Geordie songwriters like George "Geordie" Ridley and Joe Wilson.

== Early life ==
Joseph Philip Robson was born 24 September 1808 in Bailiffgate, Newcastle upon Tyne. His father was preparing for priesthood at Stonyhurst College when he suffered ill health, resulting in his inability to complete his training, and he became a Roman Catholic School teacher. Both of his parents died when he was very young, his mother when he was 6 and his father 2 years later, when he was only 8.

J P Robson himself was apprenticed as a plane maker, but severely injured himself while lifting a heavy log. He was well educated and changed career directions, becoming, like his father, a schoolmaster. He took to poetry at an early age and had his first works published in 1831.

== Marriage ==
He was married on 21 September 1830 at St Andrew Church, Newcastle upon Tyne to Isabella Stobbs. (Isabella was born in 1811 in Newcastle, and had worked as a Plain Sewer. She died in the early months of 1875 in Newcastle upon Tyne, aged 65). They had one daughter and three sons.

== Later life ==
He became a celebrated poet and a friend of many prominent poets of the day. He was persuaded by two of his musical friends to start writing in the dialect, which he did, with great success.

He received a commission from Prince Louis Lucien Bonaparte (1813–1891), to create a version of the Song of Solomon in the Tyneside dialect. In 1849–50 he moved on to editing, being involved in the book of "The Bards of the Tyne" which was a collection of local songs, including some of his own songs. In 1854 he left Newcastle and settled in Sunderland, where he assisted in the compilation of a shipping register. He later returned to Newcastle.

After the publication of "Hermione" in 1857 he received,(through Lord Palmerston), a grant of £20 from the Civil List. Towards the summer of 1869 while arranging for the publication of "Evangeline" he had a stroke. Although he did improve, this eventually led to his death. He died on 26 August 1870 in Clayton Street, Newcastle upon Tyne, aged 62 and was buried in Jesmond Old Cemetery, Newcastle upon Tyne.

== Works ==
From the amount of material, J P Robson was one of the most prolific of all the Geordie poets of the time: his songwriting added to the rich source of the dialect: nor should his contribution to the musical and dialectal history of the area.

This material includes :-

=== Poetry ===
- Blossoms of Poesy his first work (1831)
- Poetic Gatherings (1839)
- The Monomaniac (1847)
- Poetic Pencillings (1852)
- Hermione the Beloved (1857)
- The village queen
- Crimean sketches including – Going to the Trenches, Kenneth; or Duty and Death, Jack Junk and the Tartar, The Valley of Death’s Shadow, Hango’s Massacre, Tale of a Wounded Grenadier, Hunger and Heroism, The Fall of Sebastapol and The War is now all over.
- Sundry short poems including – Victoria at the tomb of Napoleon, The Turquoise and the Ruby, The Jubilee of Robert Burns, Do all the good you can, Bonnie Nellie, The Father’s Appeal, A Christmas Carol, Friendship’s Garland, The Sailor’s Return, Laugh and grow Fat, To the Statue of Hermione, The Flag of Freedom, The Time-Piece, Clouds and Sunshine, Dream of the Rainbow, Mind Yourself, The Deserted Wife, Song of the Greenwood Fays. Stanzas of Life’s Vicissitudes, Waiting for the Tide, The Last Appeal, The Postman, Silver Moon now Shining Bright, Stanzas to England, The Dying Lover, Now, Morning, Noon and Night, The Rejected One’s Farewell, The Poet’s Monument, King Crispin, Not so Bas as we seem, The Sightless, Mitherless Bairn, The Temple of the Muses, Song of the Mason, Gentle Chide, The Stormy Petrel, The Hares o' Eslington, The Floral Seraph, The Broken Lyre, Fall of the Ancestral Tree, Farewell my native Tyne, Stanzas for Music, The Beggar Laddie, Epithalamium, Wheedlin’Willie, What are Kisses like?, Kate Mullaghan, Beauty and the Beast – a Buffo Song, The Poet’s Predicament, The Withered Wreath, The Illiterate Blue, Shakespeare in Heaven, Song of the Angels, The Judge Omnipotent, To the Shade of Byron, What's in a Name?, The World’s Epitaphs, Home and it's Joys, Memory’s Rose and Rue, Flecti non Frangi, Maw Granfeyther Dan – A Local Historical Song.
- Mary of England: a Dramatic Sketch
- Evangeline or the Spirit of Progress (1869)

=== Dialect ===
- The life of Billy Purvis (1849)
- When we were at skuel'
- Polly’s Nickstick
- The High Level Bridge
- The Pitman’s Happy Times
- The Pawnshop Bleezin'
- A version of "The Song of Solomon" in the Tyneside dialect (A commission from Prince Lucien Bonaparte.
- A version of "The Book of Ruth" in the Tyneside dialect.
- J. P. Robson also contributed on many occasions from 1862 to 1871 to Chater's "Tyneside Comic Annual,"
- He wrote a weekly article to the North of England Advertiser, a letter in dialect and signed "A retiort Keelman".)

=== Editing and publishing ===
He edited "The Bards of the Tyne" which was a collection of local songs (1849–50). This work included some of his own songs.

c1854 he assisted in the compilation of a shipping register while living in Sunderland.

== See also ==
- Geordie dialect words
