= John Ross (publisher) =

English printer and publisher (19th century)

John Ross was an English printer and publisher in 19th century Newcastle. His business was in the Royal Arcade, Newcastle.

He published several music chapbooks including The Songs of the Tyne, the first collection of that name, and consisting of 10 small volumes.

== See also ==
- Geordie dialect words
