= P. France & Co. =

Nineteenth-century publishing company

P. France & Co. was a nineteenth-century publishing company based in the early years at 8 The Side, Newcastle: They were responsible for the editing, publishing, printing (and partially for the) selling of the chapbook "Songs of the Bards of the Tyne; A choice selection of original songs, chiefly in the Newcastle Dialect".

== See also ==
- Geordie dialect words
- France's Songs of the Bards of the Tyne - 1850
