= W & T Fordyce (publishers) =

Nineteenth century firm of publishers (died 1865)

- Died: 1865
- Occupation: publisher

W & T Fordyce was a nineteenth century firm of publishers based in the early years at 48 Dean Street, Newcastle upon Tyne, which later moved to 15 Grey Street, Newcastle. It was responsible for the editing, publishing, printing (and partially for the) selling of the book The Tyne Songster.

About 1837 William Fordyce (died 1865) took his brother Thomas (1810–89) into the firm as a partner and the name was changed from W Fordyce to W & T Fordyce. Thomas was in business as a printer 1832-67 at Upper Buxton St, Newcastle.

== Works ==
Items published by the firm include numerous chapbooks and several other books which include:-

- History of Paul Jones, The Pirate - A brief account of John Paul Jones, the American Revolutionary War hero, from the perspective of the British. 24 pages, undated, [18--] – sold for the price of 9d (3.75 new pence).
- A history of coal, coke, coal fields, the winning and working of collieries, varieties of coal, mine surveying and government inspection : iron, its ores and processes of manufacture, throughout Great Britain, France, Belgium, &c. : more particularly in reference to the Great Northern Coal Field of Northumberland and Durham and of the recently discovered iron ores in the Cleveland District : including estimates of the capital required to embark in the coal, coke, or iron trades; the probable amount of profit to be realised; value of mineral property &c., &c. : the information contained in the chapters on the coal and iron trades will be bought down to the present time, by William Fordyce, (Newcastle upon Tyne W. Fordyce, [18--?]).
- Local Records: or, Historical register of remarkable events, which have occurred in Northumberland and Durham, Newcastle-upon-Tyne, and Berwick-upon-Tweed from the earliest period of authentic record to the present time; with biographical notices of deceased persons of talent, eccentricity, and longevity (July 1866) - Published c. 1876 - and in which Thomas is credited as joint author
- A New Valentine Writer for Ladies & Gentlemen; Being a Choice Collection of the Most Fashionable, Quizzical, and Amorous Pieces, With Answers, Adapted to All Ages of Either Sex, and to Trades and Professions - Printed and sold by W. & T. Fordyce (Newcastle upon Tyne).
- The Long Pack, a Northumberland Tale, a Hundred Years Old - Publisher and printer, W. and T. Fordyce.
- The Tyne Songster - A Choice Selection of Songs in the Newcastle Dialect - published 1840

== See also ==
- Geordie dialect words
