= Allan's Illustrated Edition of Tyneside Songs and Readings =

Book by Thomas Allan

- Author: Thomas Allan
- Language: English (Geordie dialect)
- Publisher: Thomas Allan
- Publication date: 1891
- Publication place: United Kingdom
- Media type: Print
- Pages: approx. 600 pages

Allan's Illustrated Edition of Tyneside Songs and Readings... is an historic book of Tyneside popular and traditional songs that consisted, in its final published form, of a compilation of approximately 400 song lyrics and notes, with added songwriter and subject biographies and geographical details, together spanning over 600 pages (published, 1891). It was reprinted in 1972 by Frank Graham, Newcastle upon Tyne, with an introduction by music scholar David Harker.

== Publication of Tyneside Songs ==
The series of works are, as their titles suggest, collections of songs, topical and of popular interest at the dates of their publication. In addition, a considerable amount of further material was eventually introduced, material including illustrations of Newcastle, biographies (and related articles) on the song's composers, as well as comments from the editors regarding their influences in choosing the songs of the various editions.

The series of works began to appear in 1862, when Thomas Allan published the original work in the series, which was called "Tyneside Songs"—a very small work mainly covering songs of Edward "Ned" Corvan and George "Geordie" Ridley. A version followed in 1863, entitled "A Choice Collection of Tyneside songs", which listed "E. Corvan, G. Ridley, J. P. Robson, R. Emery, &c., &c., &c., &c., &c." as authors, and which included engravings and text descriptions of Newcastle. A third version, of 1864, was likewise titled, listing the same authors.

A further edition was published in 1872, appearing under the same title as the 1863 volume ("A Choice Collection..."), but listing as authors "[Joe] Wilson, [Edward] Corvan, [William] Mitford, [Robert] Gilchrist, [Rowland] Harrison, [J. P.] Robson, [Robert] Emery, [Geordie] Ridley, [William] Oliver, [Jack] Shield, &c,. &c.", and including illustrations of Newcastle and, newly added, "Portraits of the Poets [and] Eccentrics of Newcastle".

The final edition of the series was published in 1891, entitled "Allan's Illustrated Edition of Tyneside Songs and Readings...", a revised edition that included songwriter biographies, portraits, and autographs, as well as notes on the songs.

Hence, over the years that the Allans developed the book series, continually adding to it, it eventually, as of this date, became an extremely large volume, containing almost 400 songs and spanning almost 600 pages. Eventually, the name was changed to "Allan's Illustrated Edition of Tyneside Songs and Readings...", and the contents increased to cover the songs, as well as details and histories of them, and of their writers and singers. Moreover, as it developed, its scope changed from being limited to popular songs, to encompass many older traditional songs, thus spreading the popularity of the series to a wider audience. It is now considered an invaluable historical reference.

== Related secondary scholarship ==
- Harker, D. (1981). "The Making of the Tyneside Concert Hall". Popular Music. Folk or Popular? Distinctions, Influences, Continuities. 1: 26–56. doi:10.1017/S0261143000000908. JSTOR 853242. Article by a scholar that focuses, at least in part, on this genre of music history and musicology, in a piece that includes descriptions of some musical pieces appearing in Allan's... Tyneside Songs.
- Allan, Thomas & Harker, David (new intro.) (1972) [1891]. Allan's Illustrated Edition of Tyneside Songs and Readings, With Lives, Portraits, and Autographs of the Writers, and Notes on the Songs (facsimile) (Revised ed.). Newcastle upon Tyne: Frank Graham [orig. Thos. & George Allan]. ISBN 9780902833753. A modern facsimile edition of the 1891 classic, with a new introduction by music scholar David Harker.

== Contents ==
The contents as revealed by the Contents pages of the final (1891) edition, and Wikipedia editorial comments regarding mentions (and origins) of various subjects on various pages:

| Page | Title | Songwriter | Tune | Comments | Notes | Refs. |
|---|---|---|---|---|---|---|
| i | verso, illustration; recto, title page | | | | Illustr., "Eccentrics and Well-Known Characters in Newcastle-Upon-Tyne" | |
| iii | Dedication | | | | "To Richard Oliver Heslop, Esq. / An acknowledgment of his labours on 'Northumberland Words.'" | |
| v | Introductory Note | | | | | |
| vii to xvi | Contents | | | | | |
| 1 | Tynside Songs | | | | | |
| 1 | (Weel May) The Keel Row | Traditional – before 1760 | | | ¹ | |
| 1 | a mention of | Joihn Stokoe | | Writing in the Monthly Chronicle | ³ | |
| 1 | a mention of | William Shield | | A famous Swalwell musician | ³ | |
| 1 | a mention of | Joseph Ritson | | Ritson's " Northumberland Garland" 1703 | | |
| 1 | (Weel May) The Keel Row | Street version | | | | |
| 2 | Waggoner (The) | not given | | | | |
| 2 | Bobby Shaftoe | Traditional | | | ¹ | |
| 2 | a mention of | William Brockie | | | ³ | |
| 2 | a mention of | Cuthbert Sharp | | The Bishoprick Garland 1834 | ³ | |
| 3 | Bonny Pit Laddie (The) | not given | | | | |
| 3 | a mention of | Joseph Ritson | | Northumberland Garland or Newcastle Nightingale | ³ | |
| 4 | Bonny Keel Laddie (The) | unknown | | | | |
| 4 | a mention of | Richard Oliver Heslop | | from "Northumberland Words" | ³ | |
| 5 | Ride through Sandgate | not given | | fragment of old rhyme about the siege of 1644 | | |
| 5 | a mention of | Cuthbert Sharp | | The Bishoprick Garland 1834 | ³ | |
| 5 | Collier's Wedding – (The) | Edward Chicken | | | | |
| 5 | Short bio | Edward Chicken | | | | |
| 5 | a mention of | Mr W Call | | Published a new version of the song in 1829 | ³ | |
| 8 | My Eppie | not given | | | | |
| 8 | a mention of | William Brockie | | | ³ | |
| 9 | Northumbrian's Sigh for his Native Country (The) | | | | | |
| 9 | Sair Fail'd, Hinney | not given | | Variation on "The awd man to the oak tree" | | |
| 10 | a mention of | Cuthbert Sharp | | The Bishoprick Garland 1834 | ³ | |
| 10 | Old Man and the Oak (The) | not given | Variation on "Sair Fail'd, Hinney" | from Ritson, in Gammer Gurton's Garland | | |
| 10 | a mention of | Joseph Ritson | | Gammer Gurton's Garland | ³ | |
| 10 | Short bio | Thomas Whittle | | | | |
| 11 | William Carstairs, Schoolmaster | Thomas Whittle | | on one of his contemporaries | | |
| 11 | Short bio | William Carstairs | | | | |
| 12 | Sawney Ogilby's Duel with his Wife | Thomas Whittle | | | | |
| 13 | Little Moody, Razor-setter | Thomas Whittle | | | | |
| 15 | Jesmond Dene ³ | | | a mention of – and Lord Armstrong | ³ | |
| 15 | Short bio | Phill "Primrose" Hodgson | | | | |
| 15 | Une Bagatelle | Phill "Primrose" Hodgson | | | | |
| 15 | Jessamond Mill | Phill "Primrose" Hodgson | | | | |
| 16 | Pandon Dene | originally named as "Bosalinda" – or "Rosalinda" | | May have been a Miss Harrey of Newcastle | A-G2 | |
| 18 | Short bio | John Cunningham | | | | |
| 19 | Elegy on a Pile of Ruins – Extract from | John Cunningham | No....tho' the palace bar her golden gate | | | |
| 19 | Death of John Cunningham – (Lament on the) | Robert Gilchrist | | | | |
| 20 | Holiday Gown | John Cunningham | | | | |
| 21 | North Shields Song (A) | not given | | | | |
| 22 | Alice Marley – (A new song made on) | unknown | | An Alewife at Pictree, near Chester-le-Street | | |
| 23 | Donocht Head | George Pickering | Ye Banks and Braes | | | |
| 23 | Short bio | George Pickering | | | | |
| 25 | Collier's Rant (The) | unknown | | | | |
| 25 | a mention of | Sir Cuthbert Sharp | | | ³ | |
| 27 | Little P. D (The) | unknown | | or "Little Pee Dee" | | |
| 27 | a mention of | G Angus, printers of The Side, Newcastle | | Newcastle Garland, printed about 1805 | ³ | |
| 28 | Dol Li A | unknown | | A song famous in Newcastle about the years 1792-8-4. | | |
| 29 | A You A, Hinny Burd | unknown | | | | |
| 31 | Tyne – (The Water of) | unknown | | | | |
| 31 | a mention of | Sir C Sharp | | comments on the River Tyne | ³ | |
| 31 | South Shields Song (A) | not given | | Sir Cuthbert Sharp | | |
| 32 | a mention of | Cuthbert Sharp | | The Bishoprick Garland 1834 | ³ | |
| 32 | Blow the Wind Southerly – (a variation) | unknown | | Sunderland Sailors' Rhymes | | |
| 32 | a mention of | J Marshall | | Northern Minstrel, 1806–07 | ³ | |
| 32 | Short bio | John Gibson | | | | |
| 32 | Short bio | William Brockie | | | | |
| 32 | Tyne (The) – song number 1 | John Gibson | | Roll on thy way, thrice happy Tyne | | |
| 33 | Brandling – Family Motto | not given | | from Sharp's "Bishopric Garland" | | |
| 33 | a mention of | Cuthbert Sharp | | The Bishoprick Garland 1834 | ³ | |
| 34 | Brandling and Ridley | not given | | | | |
| 34 | Short bio | Thomas Thompson | | | | |
| 35 | a mention of | John Howard (J. H.) | | | ³ | |
| 36 | Reply to John Howard | Thomas Thompson | | | | |
| 37 | Sonnet – To Thomas Thompson on his late address to J. Howard | J. Ingo | | | | |
| 38 | Election Song, 1812 | Thomas Thompson | | | | |
| 40 | Report on the death of | Thomas Thompson | | From the Newcastle Weekly Chronicle – 14 January 1816 | | |
| 41 | Thomas Thompson – (Lament for) | maybe by Robert Gilchrist | | Tommy Thompson – (compoted Extemire) | | |
| 42 | Short bio | Robert Gilchrist | | | | |
| 42 | Short bio | Thomas Thompson's family | | | | |
| 43 | a mention of | Thomas Wilson | | Thomas Wilson | ³ | |
| 43 | Short bio | James Clephen | | author of "Over the Churchyard Wall" | | |
| 45 | New Keel Row (The) | T Thompson | | | | |
| 47 | Canny Newcastle | Thomas Thompson | | | | |
| 47 | a mention of | Dr B S Watson | | author of "A gossip about songs" | ³ | |
| 47 | a mention of | Sir Matthew White Ridley of Heaton | | MP for Newcastle to 1813 | ³ | |
| 50 | Jemmy Joneson's Whurry | Thomas Thompson | | | | |
| 50 | mention of | Richard Oliver Heslop | | | ³ | |
| 51 | Short bio | | | The Tyne ferries | | |
| 54 | Short bio | William Purvis (Blind Willie) | | | | |
| 54 | Blind Willie – (Lament for) – Extract from | Thomas Thompson | | | | |
| 54 | Short bio | Joihn Stokoe | | about Blind Willie in "The North Country Garland of Song" | | |
| 55 | Broom Buzzems – (or Buy Broom Busoms) | maybe William Purvis (Blind Willie) | | | | |
| 56 | Broom Buzzems – (Extra Verses added by Blind Willie) | William Purvis (Blind Willie) | | | | |
| 57 | Tarum Tickle, tan dum – A Rhyme by Blind Willie | William Purvis (Blind Willie) | | | | |
| 59 | Blind Willie's Death – (Epitaph to) | Robert Gilchrist | | | | |
| 60 | Bards of the Tyne (The) | Charles Purvis | | | | |
| 61 | Reply to Bards of the Tyne | | | | | |
| 61 | Newcastle Bellman (The) | John Shield | | in which the Tyne Mercury was held up to ridicule | | |
| 61 | a mention of | James Stawpert | | | ³ | |
| 61 | Short bio | Charles Purvis | | | | |
| 62 | Oxygen Gas ³ | John Shield | | A mention of | ³ | |
| 62 | Short bio | John Shield | | | | |
| 62 | Blackett's Field – Extract from | John Shield | | | | |
| 62 | O No, My Love, No – Extract from | John Shield | | | | |
| 63 | Delia's Answer – Extract from | John Shield | | | | |
| 63 | To Delia – Extract from | Shields ???? | | | | |
| 64 | Short bio | John Shield's Family | | | | |
| 65 | a mention of | Dr Clark | | | ³ | |
| 65 | In Defence of the Name of Jack | John Shield | | Addressed to Miss Carry of Dunston | | |
| 67 | Poor Tom, the Blind Boy | John Shield | | | | |
| 68 | Vanished Rose Restored – (The) | John Shield | | Sung by Mr Frith at the Newcastle Concerts | | |
| 69 | Bonny Geatsiders 1805 (The) – in praise of the Gateshead Volunteers | John Shield | Bob Crankey | under the command of Cuthbert Ellison, Esq., of Hebburn | | |
| 71 | My Lord 'Size – or Newcastle in an Uproar | John Shield | | alternate title "Newcastle in an Uproar" | | |
| 74 | Bob Cranky's Adieu | John Shield | The Soldiers Adieu | Set to music by Thomas Train and sung by him at many public dinners | | |
| 74 | a mention of | Thomas Train – of Gateshead | | | ³ | |
| 76 | Short bio | Stephen Kemble | | Former manager of the Theatre Royal, Newcastle | | |
| 76 | Barber's News – (The) – or Shields in an Uproar | John Shield | O' the Golden Days of Good Queen Bess | | | |
| 81 | Short bio | Cull Billy, alias Silly Billy | | | | |
| 82 | Cull Billy's Prize | Robert Emery | | | | |
| 83 | descriptions of places on map opposite | | | | | |
| 84 | Map of Newcastle | | | | | |
| 84 | Short bio | John Selkirk | | | | |
| 85 | Bob Cranky | John Selkirk | | | | |
| 85 | a mention of | John Marshall | | Northern Minstrel, 1806–07 | ³ | |
| 86 | Report on the death of | John Selkirk | | A report from the Newcastle Chronicle, 18 November 1843 | | |
| 88 | Bob Cranky's 'Size Sunday | John Selkirk | | | | |
| 88 | a mention of | William Henderson Dawson | | | ³ | |
| 91 | Bob Cranky's Complaint | John Selkirk | | | | |
| 93 | Swalwell Hopping | John Selkirk | Paddy's Wedding | | | |
| 96 | Bob Cranky's Leum'nation Neet | John Selkirk | | | | |
| 99 | Short bio | James Stawpert | | | | |
| 100 | John Diggons – Extract from | James Stawpert | | | | |
| 100 | Trafalgar's Battle – Extract from | James Stawpert | | | | |
| 100 | Newcastle Fair October 1811 – or The Pitman Drinking Jackey | James Stawpert | | | | |
| 102 | Pitman's Revenge against Bonaparte – (The) | George Cameron | | | A-C1 | |
| 102 | Short bio | George Cameron | | | | |
| 106 | Short bio | Henry Robson | | | | |
| 106 | a mention of | John Collingwood Bruce and John Stokoe (editors) | | Northumbrian Minstrelsy: a collection of the ballads, melodies, and small-pipe tunes of Northumbria | ³ | |
| 107 | a mention of | Robert Emery | | | ³ | |
| 107 | a mention of | G Angus, printers of The Side, Newcastle | | | ³ | |
| 107 | Colliers' Pay Week (The) | Henry Robson | | A Picture of Benwell Pit Life about the year 1800 | | |
| 114 | Sandgate Lassie's Lament (The) | Henry Robson | The Bonnie Pit Laddie | | | |
| 115 | Till the Tide cums in | Henry Robson | | | | |
| 116 | Ma' Canny Hinny | unknown | | | | |
| 117 | Children's Rhymes | | | | | |
| 117 | Rain, rain, gan away | anon | | | | |
| 117 | Keel-bully, keel-bully, ploat yor geese | anon | | | | |
| 118 | Sunderland Song – (A) | not given | | | | |
| 118 | a mention of | Cuthbert Sharp | | The Bishoprick Garland 1834 | ³ | |
| 118 | Andrew Carr | not given | | | | |
| 118 | Northern Nursery Song | not given | | | | |
| 118 | a mention of | Cuthbert Sharp | | The Bishoprick Garland 1834 | ³ | |
| 119 | Short bio | William Stephenson (senior) | | | | |
| 120 | Retrospect – (The) | William Stephenson (senior) | | | | |
| 120 | Age of Eighty | William Stephenson (senior) | | | | |
| 121 | Quayside Shaver – (The) | William Stephenson (senior) | | | | |
| 123 | Skipper's Wedding – (The) | William Stephenson (senior) | | previously named "The Invitation" | | |
| 126 | Newcastle on Saturday Night | William Stephenson (senior) | | | Fr-Tune08 | |
| 128 | Short bio | John Leonard | | | | |
| 129 | Lines on William Pitt – Extract from | John Leonard | | | | |
| 130 | Winlaton Hoppin' | John Leonard | | | | |
| 132 | Short bio | William Mitford | | | | |
| 132 | a mention of | J Marshall | | Newcastle Songster - by J. Marshall | ³ | |
| 133 | X. Y. Z. (a mention only) | William Mitford | | | ³ | |
| 134 | North Pole – (The) – Extract from | William Mitford | | | | |
| 134 | Newcastle Landlords 1834 – Extract from | William Watson | | | | |
| 135 | William Mitford – (Acrostic on) | Robert Emery | | | | |
| 136 | Tyne Fair | William Mitford | | commemoration the winter of 1813–14 when the Tyne was frozen over for three weeks | | |
| 138 | X. Y. Z. At Newcastle Races, 1814 (or Pitmen's Luck) | William Mitford | | | | |
| 141 | Cappy – or The Pitman's Dog | William Mitford – according to Allan's | Chapter of Donkeys | | | |
| 143 | Pitman's Courtship – (The) | William Mitford | The night before Larry was stretched | | | |
| 145 | Mayor of Bordeaux (The) – or Mally 's Mistake | William Mitford | | | | |
| 147 | Pitman's Skellyscope (The) | William Mitford | | | Fr-Tune07 | |
| 147 | a mention of | Sir David Brewster | | His invention, the Kaleidoscope first came out c1820 | ³ | |
| 149 | Wonderful Gutter (The) | William Mitford | | over the argument between rail or canal | | |
| 151 | Bewildered Skipper (The) | William Mitford | The bewildered maid | | | |
| 151 | Sandgate Girl's Lamentation (The) | unknown | | | | |
| 153 | Half-Drowned Skipper (The) – from page 153 ³ | unknown | Chapter of Donkeys | | | |
| 154 | Wreckenton Hiring | unknown | | | | |
| 156 | Canny Sheels | John Morrison | | First appeared in Davidson of Alnwick's collection of Tyneside Songs 1840 | | |
| 156 | a mention of | William Davison | | William Davison of Alnwick's collection of Tyneside Songs, 1840 | ³ | |
| 156 | Permanent Yeast ³ | John Morrison | | a mention only | ³ | |
| 158 | Coaly Tyne | unknown | Auld Lang Syne | Written during the trial of Queen Caroline in 1820. (See last verse.) | | |
| 160 | Walker Pits | unknown | Off She Goes | | | |
| 160 | Fisher's Garland – (The) | Robert Roxby & Thomas Doubleday | | published 1841 | | |
| 160 | Short bio | Robert Roxby | | | | |
| 160 | Short bio | Thomas Doubleday | | | | |
| 161 | Auld Fisher's Lament (The) ³ | Robert Roxby & Thomas Doubleday | | a mention only | ³ | |
| 161 | Auld Fisher's Last Wish – (The) | Robert Roxby & Thomas Doubleday | My love is newly listed | | | |
| 162 | a mention of | Dr B S Watson | | author of "A gossip about songs" | ³ | |
| 162 | Coquet Side | Robert Roxby & Thomas Doubleday | They may rail at this life | | | |
| 164 | Auld Fisher's Fareweel to Coquet – (The) | Robert Roxby & Thomas Doubleday | Gramachree | | | |
| 166 | Coquet for Ever – (The) | Robert Roxby & Thomas Doubleday | Oh, Whistle and I'll come to you, my lad | | | |
| 167 | Impatient Lassie – (The) | Robert Anderson – probably | Low down in the broom | | | |
| 167 | a mention of | Robert Anderson | | Cumberland Ballads | ³ | |
| 167 | Short bio | Robert Anderson | | | | |
| 169 | Short bio | Robert Gilchrist | | | | |
| 170 | Gothalbert and Hisanna – Extract from | Robert Gilchrist | | | | |
| 171 | Gothalbert of the Tyne | Robert Gilchrist | | | | |
| 172 | Zion's Hill – Extract from | Robert Gilchrist | | | | |
| 172 | Bethlehem's Star – Extract from | Robert Gilchrist | | | | |
| 172 | St. Nicholas' Church – (On) | Robert Gilchrist | | | | |
| 174 | Petition from the old House in Shieldfield | Robert Gilchrist | | | | |
| 175 | Poetic Fragments | Robert Gilchrist | | | | |
| 176 | Sonnet on the Shortest Day | Robert Gilchrist | | | | |
| 176 | Clennell's Lines on Robert Gilchrist's Death . | John Luke Clennell | | | | |
| 177 | Collier's Keek at the Nation (The) | Robert Gilchrist | | | | |
| 179 | Short bio | Bold Archy – Archy Henderson | | | | |
| 179 | On the Death of Bold Archy | Robert Gilchrist | | | | |
| 180 | Bold Archy Drownded | Robert Gilchrist | The Bold Dragoon | | | |
| 181 | Short bio | William Scott | | | | |
| 182 | Voyage To Lunnin (A) | Robert Gilchrist | | | | |
| 186 | Amphitrite – (The) | Robert Gilchrist | | | | |
| 188 | Blind Willie Singin' | Robert Gilchrist | Jemmy Joneson's Whurry | actually named as Blind Willie's Singing in this book | | |
| 188 | short bio | William Purvis (Blind Willie) | | | | |
| 190 | Lamentation on the Death of Captain Benjamin Starkey – (The) | Robert Gilchrist | | | | |
| 190 | Short bio | Captain Benjamin Starkey | | | | |
| 191 | a mention of | Cuckoo Jack | | John Wilson alias Cuckoo Jack | ³ | |
| 192 | Blind Willie's Death (or Deeth) | Robert Nunn | Jemmy Joneson's Whurry | was wrongly attributed to Robert Gilchrist for many years | | |
| 194 | a mention of | Robert Nunn | | | ³ | |
| 194 | More Innovations | Robert Gilchrist | The Bold Dragoon | | | |
| 196 | Short bio | author of The Corn Market – (Robert Gilchrist) | | | | |
| 196 | Corn Market (The) – A Lament | unknown – possibly (Gilchrist) | The Bold Dragoon | first appeared in Fordyce's Collection (1842) – Allan guesses the author is Robert Gilchrist | | |
| 198 | Short bio | James Morrison | | | | |
| 199 | Burdon's Address to the cavalry – A parody | James Morrison | Scots Wha Hae | | | |
| 199 | Short bio | Thomas Burdon, Lieut. Colonel of the Tyne Hussars | | soon to be knighted by the Prince Regent in May 1816 | | |
| 200 | Newcastle Noodles (The) | James Morrison | Canny Newcassel | | | |
| 200 | a mention of | Charles John Brandling | | | ³ | |
| 202 | Green's Balloon | unknown | Barbara Bell | | | |
| 202 | a mention of | Mr (or Messrs) Green | | | ³ | |
| 204 | Short bio | William Watson | | | | |
| 206 | Newcassel Races | William Watson | | | | |
| 208 | Thumping Luck | William Watson | Gang Nae Mair to Yon Toon | | | |
| 210 | Dance To Thy Daddy | William Watson | The Little Fishy | | | |
| 211 | Newcastle Landlords 1834 | William Watson | | | | |
| 215 | Short bio | William Armstrong | | | | |
| 216 | Jenny Howlett (The) – or Lizzie Mudie's Ghost | William Armstrong | | | | |
| 217 | Baboon (The) | William Armstrong | | | | |
| 218 | Glister (The) | William Armstrong | | | | |
| 219 | Floatin' Gunstan – (The) | William Armstrong | Derry Down | About a "Floating Grindstone" | | |
| 220 | Skipper in the Mist (The) | William Armstrong | Derry Down | | | |
| 221 | Billy Oliver's Ramble (Between Benwell and Newcastle) | anon | | first appeared in "The Shields Song Book" of 1826 | | |
| 221 | My Nyem is Willy Dixon ³ | not given | | a mention only – A parody on Billy Oliver's Ramble. It appeared in The Tyne Songster | ³ | |
| 223 | Devil (The) – or The Nanny Goat | anon | | | | |
| 223 | The Shields Song Book ³ | printed by C. W. Barnes | | a mention only | ³ | |
| 225 | Cliffs of Virginia (The) | anon | Drops of Brandy | first appeared in "The Shields Song Book" of 1826 | | |
| 227 | Skipper's Mistake (The) | Armstrong | Chapter of Accidents | | F-A1 | |
| 228 | Short bio | William Oliver | | | | |
| 229 | To the Mechanics' Institute of Newcastle upon Tyne | William Oliver | | | | |
| 229 | To the memory of Riego, the Spanish patriot ³ | William Oliver | | a mention only | ³ | |
| 229 | England, Awake ³ | William Oliver | | a mention only | ³ | |
| 230 | Various addresses to Corinthian Society – Extract from | | | | | |
| 230 | given on 4 June 1827 | D.H. (possibly David Hobkirk) | | | | |
| 230 | given on 29 August 1827 | P. G. (possibly P. Galloway) | | | | |
| 231 | given on 21 May 1830 | unknown (possibly Thomas Thompson) | | | | |
| 231 | given on possibly 4 Dec 1830 | W. O. (possibly William Oliver) | | | | |
| 231 | Alexander Donkin (Lines on the Death of) – Extract from | W. O. possibly William Oliver | | 12 Feb 1825 | | |
| 232 | Alexander Donkin – (A Lament on the death of) | P. G. (possibly P. Galloway) | | | | |
| 232 | Richard Young, who died 4 November 1831, aged 29 – (To the Memory of) | William Oliver | | | | |
| 232 | Richard Young – (To the Memory of) | P. G. (possibly P. Galloway) | | | | |
| 232 | R. Young – (To the Memory of) | D.H. (possibly David Hobkirk) | | | | |
| 233 | J. Brandling, M.P. – (Lines on the Death of a) | William Oliver | | | | |
| 234 | Newcassel Props (The) | William Oliver | The Bold Dragoon | | | |
| 236 | a mention of | Mr Wombwell and his animal show | | | ³ | |
| 236 | Bonassus (The) | William Oliver | Jemmy Joneson's Whurry | | | |
| 238 | Tim Tunbelly | William Oliver | | | | |
| 240 | Newcastle Millers – (The) | William Oliver | The Bold Dragoon | a prize fight on Barlow Fell in which Jim Wallace beat Tm Dunn 1824 | | |
| 241 | Lament – (The) | William Oliver | The Bold Dragoon | | | |
| 243 | New Markets (The) (or Newcastle Improvements) | William Oliver | Canny Newcassel | | | |
| 244 | Short bio | R. Charlton | | | | |
| 245 | Newcastle Improvements | R.Charlton | | | | |
| 246 | Newgate Street Petition to Mr. Mayor (The) | anon – but suggested as John Shield | | | | |
| 250 | Short bio | Thomas Marshall | | | | |
| 251 | Euphy's Coronation | Thomas Marshall | Arthur McBride | | | |
| 253 | Blind Willie v. Billy Scott | Thomas Marshall | Fie, let's away to the bridal | | | |
| 255 | Tars and Skippers | Thomas Marshall | Derry Down | | | |
| 257 | Keel Row (Weel May The Keel Row – that get's the Bairns their Breed) | Thomas Marshall | | | | |
| 258 | Short bio | Thomas Wilson | | | | |
| 259 | Market Day – (The) – Extract from | Thomas Wilson | | | | |
| 260 | Pitman's Pay – Extract from | Thomas Wilson | | | | |
| 261 | a mention of | William Henderson Dawson | | a tribute to Thomas Wilson | ³ | |
| 261 | Petition of an Old Apple Tree – Extract from | Thomas Wilson | | | | |
| 262 | Moose – (Lines on a) – Extract from | Thomas Wilson | | | | |
| 262 | Long, long ago | Thomas Wilson | | | | |
| 262 | lines on an Old Arm Chair – Extrasc from | Thomas Wilson | | | | |
| 264 | a mention of ³ | | | A typical washing day | ³ | |
| 264 | Washing-Day – (The) | Thomas Wilson | Nae luck aboot the hoose | | | |
| 266 | Carter's Well | Thomas Wilson | Mrs Johnson | | | |
| 268 | Opening of the Newcastle and Carlisle Railway | Thomas Wilson | | on 18 June 1888 | | |
| 270 | Movement – (The) | Thomas Wilson | | | | |
| 272 | Pea Jacket – (The) | Thomas Wilson | | | | |
| 273 | Glance at Polly Technic (A) | Thomas Wilson | | | | |
| 275 | Market Day – (The) | Thomas Wilson | | | | |
| 277 | Coal Trade (The) | unknown | The Keel Row | | Br S6 | |
| 279 | a mention of | T W Beaumont | | | ³ | |
| 279 | a mention of | Robert Surtees | | | ³ | |
| 279 | Colours – (The) | maybe Robert Surtees | | | | |
| 281 | Short bio | David Ross Lietch | | | | |
| 281 | Red Eric and Lord Delaval | David Ross Lietch | | | | |
| 283 | Short bio | John Jack Dent | | | | |
| 283 | Lines to Joe Wilson – Extract from | John Jack Dent | | on seeing Joe Wilson's portrait in Mr. France's window | | |
| 284 | Cliffs of Old Tynemouth – (The) | David Ross Lietch | The Meeting of the Waters | | | |
| 284 | Short bio | Robert Emery | | | | |
| 286 | Great Frost on River Tyne – Extract from | Robert Emery | | Thomas Binney completed the verses | | |
| 286 | Short bio | Thomas Binney | | | | |
| 287 | Trip to Warkworth | Robert Emery | | Written for the employees of Lambert's Printers for their "works trip" | | |
| 289 | Canny Sheels ³ | John Morrison | | a mention of | ³ | |
| 289 | Answer to Canny Sheels – Extract from | Robert Emery | | | | |
| 289 | Song on opening of New Fish Market – Extract from | Robert Emery | | on the occasion of the fishwives being removed from their open stand on the Sandhill to the new covered market | | |
| 290 | Short bio | Metcalfe Ross | | | | |
| 290 | Robert Emery – (Address to) | Metcalfe Ross | | | | |
| 290 | Jean Jamieson's Ghost ³ | Robert Emery | | a mention of | ³ | |
| 290 | Robert Emery – Acrostic on | Joe Wilson | | | | |
| 290 | Lines to Miss Bell – Extract from | Robert Gilchrist | | The daughter of John Bell Junior | | |
| 291 | Hydrophobia – or The Skipper and the Quaker | Robert Emery | Good Morrow to your Nightcap | | | |
| 293 | Hackney Coach Customers – or Newcastle Wonders | Robert Emery | | | | |
| 294 | Pitman's Ramble (The) | Robert Emery | The Kebuckstane Wedding | | | |
| 296 | King Willy's Coronation | Robert Emery | | | | |
| 296 | Sandhill Wine Pant – (The) | Robert Emery | | | | |
| 297 | Songs on George IV.'s Coronation – Extract from | Robert Emery | | | | |
| 299 | Sandgate Pant – or Jane Jemieson's Ghost | Robert Emery | To be a Butterfly | | | |
| 300 | Baggy Nanny – or The Pitman's Frolic | Robert Emery | The Kebuckstane Wedding | | | |
| 302 | Skipper's Visit to the Polytechnic – (The) | Robert Emery | | | | |
| 305 | Mally and the Prophet | Robert Emery | Barbara Bell | | | |
| 307 | Curds-and-cream House Ghost – (The) | Robert Emery | Walker, the Twopenny Poetman | | | |
| 308 | Wizard of the North – (The) – or The Mystic Policeman | Robert Emery | Hurrah for the bonnets o' Bonnie Dundee | | | |
| 308 | Short bio | John Elliott | | Superintendent of Gateshead Police c1890 | | |
| 310 | Owl (The) | Robert Emery | X. Y. Z. | | | |
| 310 | Short bio | Mr T Waller Watson | | | | |
| 310 | Short bio | Thomas Carr | | Captain of the Watch 1823 | | |
| 312 | Skipper's Dream (The) | T Moor | | | | |
| 312 | Short bio | T Moor | | | | |
| 313 | Short bio | William Stephenson (junior) | | | | |
| 313 | Beggars' Wedding – (The) ³ | William Stephenson (junior) | | a mention of | ³ | |
| 314 | Lass that shed a tear for me (The) ³ | William Stephenson (junior) | | a mention of | ³ | |
| 314 | Ellen – Extract from | William Stephenson (junior) | Robin Adair | | | |
| 314 | Beggars' Wedding – (The) | William Stephenson (junior) | Quayside Shaver | | | |
| 316 | Sandhill Monkey (The) | William Stephenson (junior) | Drops of Brandy | | | |
| 318 | Merry Lads of Gyetshead | William Stephenson (junior) | Sunny Banks of Scotland | | | |
| 319 | Short bio | Robert Nunn | | | | |
| 320 | Sandgate Lassie's Lament (The) – Extract from | Robert Emery | | The death of Bobby Nunn is mentioned in the song | | |
| 320 | Death of Bobby Nunn | Robert Emery | | mentioned in "The Sandgate Lassie's Lament" | | |
| 321 | Roby's Wife's Lamentation | Robert Nunn | | | | |
| 322 | Lines on Hawthorn's Trip – Extract from | Robert Nunn | | | | |
| 323 | Nunn, Acrostic on | Joe Wilson | | | | |
| 323 | Pitman and the Blackin' – (The) | Robert Nunn | The Coal-Hole | | | |
| 323 | Poor auld horse (The) ³ | Robert Nunn | | a mention of | ³ | |
| 323 | Quarter of currans (The) ³ | Robert Nunn | | a mention of | ³ | |
| 325 | Newcastle Lad – (The) – or Newcastle is My Native Place | Robert Nunn | And sae wi we yet | | | |
| 326 | Luckey's Dream | Robert Nunn | Caller Fair | sometimes Luckey, Lukey or Lucky | | |
| 329 | Short history | | | St. Nicholas' Church | | |
| 329 | Riddle of St Nicholas' (The) | Ben Jonson | | | | |
| 329 | St. Nicholas' Church | Robert Nunn | | | | |
| 331 | Keelman's Reasons for Attending Church – (The) | Robert Nunn | Jemmy Joneson's Whurry | | | |
| 333 | Sandgate Lass on the Ropery Bank (The) | Robert Nunn | The Skipper's Wedding | | | |
| 333 | Short bio | | | Ropery Bank | | |
| 335 | Drucken Bella Roy, O ! | Robert Nunn | Duncan M'Callaghan | | | |
| 335 | Short bio | Bella Roy | | | | |
| 336 | Jocker | Robert Nunn | O? Gin I Had Her | | | |
| 338 | Fiery Clock-fyece (The) | Robert Nunn | The Coal-hole | | | |
| 340 | Sandgate Wife's Nurse Song | Robert Nunn | | | | |
| 341 | Short bio | John Brodie Gilroy | | | | |
| 342 | Noodle – (The) | John Brodie Gilroy | Jeannette and Jeannot | | | |
| 343 | Short bio | John Peacock | | | | |
| 343 | a mention of | Mr William Brockie | | | ³ | |
| 343 | Marsden Rock | John Peacock | Jockey to the fair | | | |
| 343 | Short bio | | | Marsden Rock | | |
| 345 | short bio | Joseph Philip Robson | | | | |
| 347 | Parting Address to the People of Tyneside – Extract from | Joseph Philip Robson | | | | |
| 347 | In memory of Joseph Philip Robson | Mr Joseph McGill | | | | |
| 347 | Joseph Philip Robson, Acrostic on | Joe Wilson | | | | |
| 348 | Exile's Return – (The) | Joseph Philip Robson | | | | |
| 348 | Lays of the Tyne Exile – Extract from | Joseph Philip Robson | | | | |
| 348 | Departure (The) ³ | Joseph Philip Robson | | a mention only | ³ | |
| 348 | In Childhood we Wander ³ | Joseph Philip Robson | | a mention only | ³ | |
| 348 | Farewell, Fair Fields ³ | Joseph Philip Robson | | a mention only | ³ | |
| 348 | Maid of my Bosom ³ | Joseph Philip Robson | | a mention only | ³ | |
| 348 | Banks o' Tyne ³ | Joseph Philip Robson | | a mention only | ³ | |
| 348 | Return (The) ³ | Joseph Philip Robson | | a mention only | ³ | |
| 349 | Banks o' Tyne | Joseph Philip Robson | The Keel Row | | | |
| 350 | Wonderful Tallygrip – (The) | Joseph Philip Robson | Barbara Bell | | | |
| 352 | When we were at the Skuel | Joseph Philip Robson | Nae luck aboot the hoose | | | |
| 352 | Dom'nee lo'ed the "Quaker's Wife – (The) | Joseph Philip Robson | | | | |
| 354 | Polly's Nickstick | J P Robson | | | | |
| 359 | High Level Bridge (The) | J P Robson | Drops of Brandy | | | |
| 361 | Callerforney – A dialogue | J P Robson | Alley Croaker | | | |
| 363 | Pawnshop Bleezin' – (The) | J P Robson | X. Y. Z. | Mrs Potter's pawnshop, on The Side, Newcastle, was completely destroyed by fire, in 1849 | | |
| 366 | Use an' the Abuse -(The) – or The Pitmen an the preachers | J P Robson | Canny Newcassel | | | |
| 366 | Maw Marras, tyek wamin' be me | J P Robson | | | | |
| 368 | Days and Deeds of Shakspere | J P Robson | The Old English Gentleman | | | |
| 371 | Hamlick, Prince of Denton – Part First | J P Robson | Merrily dance the Quaker's wife | | | |
| 374 | Hamlick, Prince of Denton – Part Second | J P Robson | Merrily dance the Quaker's wife | | | |
| 377 | Hamlick, Prince of Denton – Part Third | J P Robson | Merrily dance the Quaker's wife | | | |
| 379 | Pitman's Happy Times – (The) | J P Robson | In the days we went a' gipsying | | | |
| 381 | Horrid War i' Sangeyt – (The) | J P Robson | The King o' the Cannibal Islands | | | |
| 384 | Betty Beesley and her Wooden Man | J P Robson | The Bold Dragoon | | | |
| 387 | Short bio | Edward Corvan | | | | |
| 389 | a mention of | Catgut Jim | | pseudonym of Edward Corvan | ³ | |
| 392 | Caller – (The) – Extract from | Edward Corvan | | | | |
| 393 | a mention of | Joe Wilson | | | ³ | |
| 393 | Corvan, Acrostic on | Joe Wilson | | | | |
| 394 | He Wad be a Noodle | Edward Corvan | Gee, Wo Dobbin | | | |
| 395 | Toon Improvement Bill – (The) – or Ne Pleyce noo te play | Edward Corvan | | | | |
| 398 | Rise in Coals – (The) | Edward Corvan | | | | |
| 399 | Asstrilly – or The Pitman's Farewell | Edward Corvan | All round my hat | | | |
| 401 | Asstrilly's Goold Fields – or Tommy Carr's Letter | Edward Corvan | Marble Halls | | | |
| 403 | Tommy Carr's Adventures in Asstrilly | Edward Corvan | | | | |
| 405 | Cullercoats Fish-Lass – (The) | Edward Corvan | Lilie's a Lady | | | |
| 406 | Bobby the Boxer | Edward Corvan | Pat's Curiosity Shop | | | |
| 409 | Warkworth Feast | Edward Corvan | Morpeth Jail | | | |
| 411 | Kipper'd Herrin' – (The) | Edward Corvan | | | | |
| 412 | Deeth o' Billy Purvis | Edward Corvan | Jenny Jones | | | |
| 412 | Short bio | William Purvis (Blind Willie) | | | | |
| 416 | Greet Bull-Dog O' Shields – (The) | Edward Corvan | Hokey Pokey | About the visit of HMS Bulldog | | |
| 419 | Fishermen Hung the Monkey, O! – (The) | Edward Corvan | The Tinker's Wedding | The Hartlepool monkey-hangers | | |
| 421 | Comet – (The) – or The Skipper's Fright | Edward Corvan | Polly Parker, O | | | |
| 422 | Fire on the Kee – (The) | Edward Corvan | Wor Jocker | | | |
| 426 | Chambers and White | Edward Corvan | Trab, Trab | A race between rowers Thomas White (London) and Robert Chambers (Newcastle) | | |
| 428 | Deeth o' Cuckoo Jack – (The) | Edward Corvan | | | | |
| 428 | Short bio | John Wilson alias Cuckoo Jack | | | | |
| 430 | Wor Tyneside Champions | Edward Corvan | Billy Nat | | | |
| 432 | Queen has sent a Letter – (The) – or "The Hartley Calamity" | Edward Corvan | No Irish need apply | | | |
| 434 | Queen's Visit to Cherbourg – (The) | Edward Corvan | The Sly Old Fox | | | |
| 438 | Stagestruck Keelman | Edward Corvan | Bob and Joan | | | |
| 439 | Soop Kitchin – (The) | Edward Corvan | Lilie's a Lady | | | |
| 442 | Short bio ³ | | | The new High Level Bridge | ³ | |
| 442 | High Level an' the Aud Bridge – (The) | assume Edward Corvan | various tunes | A comic imaginary dialogue | | |
| 444 | Cat-gut Jim – the Fiddler | Edward Corvan | And sae off wi' ye | pseudonym of Edward Corvan | | |
| 446 | Short bio | George Ridley | | | | |
| 448 | George Ridley – (Acrostic on) | Joe Wilson | | | | |
| 449 | Joey Jones | George Ridley | Pat of Mullingar | | | |
| 451 | Blaydon Races | George Ridley | Brighton | | | |
| 453 | short bio | Robert Chambers | | Champion sculler | | |
| 453 | Chambers | George Ridley | The whole hog or none | | | |
| 454 | Sheels Lass for Me – (The) | George Ridley | The whole hog or none | | | |
| 456 | Bobby Cure – (The) | George Ridley | The perfect care | | | |
| 458 | Johnny Luik-Up | George Ridley | Sally, come up | | | |
| 458 | short bio | John Higgins | | Town Crier at the time | | |
| 460 | Short bio | John Spencer | | | | |
| 460 | My name is Jack Spencer | George Ridley | Hamlet | | | |
| 461 | Stephenson Monument – (The) | George Ridley | John Barleycorn | | | |
| 464 | Short bio | James Rewcastle | | | | |
| 464 | Jackey and Jenny | James Rewcastle | Come, fie, let us a' to the bridal | | | |
| 466 | Short bio | Edward Elliott | | | | |
| 466 | Sheep-Killin' Dog – (The) | Edward Elliott | | | | |
| 468 | Whitley Camp | Edward Elliott | | | | |
| 470 | Short bio | Michael Benson | | | | |
| 470 | a mention of | J Selkirk | | | ³ | |
| 471 | Birth of Friendship's Star – (The) | Michael Benson | | | | |
| 473 | Short bio | Joe Wilson | | | | |
| 474 | Great Boat Race – (The) | Joe Wilson | | a mention of | ³ | |
| 474 | Row upon the stairs – (The) | Joe Wilson | | a mention of | ³ | |
| 474 | Gallowgate Lad – (The) | Joe Wilson | | a mention of | ³ | |
| 475 | Geordy, haud the bairn | Joe Wilson | | a mention of | ³ | |
| 476 | Aw Wish yor Muther wad Cum – or Wor Geordy's notions aboot men nursin' bairns | Joe Wilson | The Whasslin' Theef | | | |
| 478 | Dinnet Clash the Door | Joe Wilson | Tramp, tramp | | | |
| 479 | Be Kind te me Dowtor | Joe Wilson | Die an aud maid | | | |
| 481 | Time that me Fethur wes Bad – (The) | not given | Cam hyem te yor childer an' me | | | |
| 482 | Short bio | Ralph Blackett | | | | |
| 482 | Jimmy's Deeth | Ralph Blackett | | | | |
| 484 | short bio | William Henderson Dawson | | | | |
| 484 | short bio | | | Stephenson's Monument | | |
| 484 | a mention of | J P Robson | | | ³ | |
| 485 | Pitman's Tickor an' the Wag-at-the-Wa' – (The) | William Henderson Dawson | Barbara Allen | | | |
| 486 | Pitman's Visit to Stephenson's Monument – (The) | William Henderson Dawson | Tallygrip | | | |
| 486 | short bio | | | Stephenson's Monument | | |
| 489 | Short bio | John Stephenson | | also known as Wood-Legged Jack | | |
| 489 | Jack's Wooden Leg | William Henderson Dawson | Wonderful Tallygrip | | | |
| 491 | Short bio | John Kelday Smith | | | | |
| 491 | Whereivvor hae they gyen ? | John Kelday Smith | Perhaps she's on the railway | | | |
| 492 | Forst ov Owt ye Had – (The) | John Kelday Smith | When the kyo comes home | | | |
| 493 | Short bio | Matthew Dryden | | | | |
| 494 | Perseveer – or The Nine Oors Movemint | Matthew Dryden | Nelly Ray | | | |
| 495 | Short bio | James Horsley | | | | |
| 495 | Geordy's Dream – or the Sun and the Muen | James Horsley | | a mention of | ³ | |
| 496 | Pilgrimage to Jesmond – (A) – Extract from | James Horsley | | | | |
| 496 | To the Angel of Death | James Horsley | | | | |
| 497 | She's Sumboddy's Bairn | James Horsley | | | | |
| 499 | Chinese Sailors in Newcastle – (The) | James Horsley | | | | |
| 501 | Short bio | George Charleton Barron | | | | |
| 503 | Bill Smith at the Battle of Waterloo | George Charleton Barron | | | | |
| 504 | How Waterloo was won | George Charleton Barron | | | | |
| 505 | Short bio | John Taylor | | | | |
| 506 | Short bio | Henry "Harry" Clasper | | | | |
| 506 | Short bio | and other rowers on the Tyne | | | | |
| 507 | Henry "Harry" Clasper and his Testimonial | John Taylor | | | | |
| 509 | Flay Craw – (The) – or Pee Dee*s Mishap | John Taylor | Warkworth Feast | | | |
| 511 | a mention of | Marshall Cresswell | | | ³ | |
| 511 | Short bio | William Dunbar | | | | |
| 511 | Geordy's Pay – Extract from | William Dunbar | | | | |
| 512 | Nowt as Queer as Folks | William Dunbar | | | | |
| 512 | Short bio | Marshall Cresswell | | | | |
| 512 | Morpeth Lodgings | Marshall Cresswell | | | | |
| 513 | Part III – Living Writers | | | | | |
| 513 | Short bio | Rowland Harrison | | | | |
| 513 | Coal Cartman – or Tm going down the Hill (The) | Rowland Harrison | | | a mention of | ³ |
| 513 | Drum Major (The) | Rowland Harrison | | | a mention of | ³ |
| 513 | Lass I met at Shields (The) | Rowland Harrison | | | a mention of | ³ |
| 513 | Death of Renforth (The) | Rowland Harrison | | | a mention of | ³ |
| 514 | Short bio | Geordy Black | | a character which he played | | |
| 515 | Geordy Black | Rowland Harrison | | | | |
| 516 | Jack Simpson's Bairn | Rowland Harrison | | | | |
| 518 | Heh ye seen wor Cuddy? | George Guthrie | The King o' the Cannibal Islands | | | |
| 518 | Short bio | George Guthrie | | | | |
| 519 | Aw wish Pay Friday wad cum | Mr (James) Anderson | Aw wish yor muther wud cum | | | |
| 519 | Short bio | Mr (James) Anderson | | | | |
| 519 | a mention of | Joe Wilson | | | ³ | |
| 522 | Cuddy Willy's Deeth | Joshua L. Bagnall | | | | |
| 522 | Short bio | Joshua L. Bagnall | | | | |
| 524 | Short bio | William Maclachlan alias "Cuddy Willy" | | | | |
| 524 | Tyne Exile's Lament (The) | anon | Banks o' the Dee | | | |
| 524 | short bio | Mr Crawhall | | publisher of the illustrated "Beuk o* Newcassel Sangs by deceased writers" | | |
| 525 | Bobbies an' the Dogs – (The) | anon | | | | |
| 525 | short bio | | | on Dogcatching | | |
| 527 | Short bio | Robert Chambers | | Champion oarsman of the River Tyne and Thames | | |
| 528 | Bob Chambers | anon | Kiss me quick, and go | | | |
| 530 | short bio | Richard Oliver Heslop | | | | |
| 531 | Howdon for Jarrow | Richard Oliver Heslop | Chapter of Donkeys | | | |
| 532 | Newcastle Toon née Mair | Richard Oliver Heslop | Nae luck aboot the hoose | | | |
| 532 | Short bio | Ernest Wilberforce | | First Bishop of Newcastle | | |
| 533 | Tow for Nowt, A (Song) | Richard Oliver Heslop | | | | |
| 535 | Singin' Hinney – (The) | Richard Oliver Heslop | The One-Horse Shay | | | |
| 537 | Tyneside Chorus – (The) | Richard Oliver Heslop | Hadaway Harry ! Hadaway Harry ! | | | |
| 538 | His Other Eye | not given | | a recitation | | |
| 545 | short bio | John Atlantic Stephenson | | | | |
| 546 | a mention of | | | The Bewick Club | ³ | |
| 546 | Battle of Waterloo – (Hawks's Men at the) | John Atlantic Stephenson | | | | |
| 547 | Tow for Nowt – (A) – A Recitation | John Atlantic Stephenson | | | | |
| 548 | Corvan, Ned – (A Recollection of) | John Atlantic Stephenson | | | | |
| 550 | Chieftain to the highlands bound (A) (actual title unknown) | possibly Edward "Ned" Corvan | | | | |
| 550 | Postponed Goose – (The) – A Wearside Tale | John Atlantic Stephenson | | | | |
| 553 | Adam and Eve | John Atlantic Stephenson | | A Wearside Story | | |
| 555 | Short bio | Thomas Kerr | | | | |
| 555 | a mention of | Joe Wilson | | | ³ | |
| 556 | When the Good Times cum Agyen | Thomas Kerr | The Captain with the whiskers | | | |
| 558 | Aw's glad the Strike's Duin | Thomas Kerr | It's time to get up | | | |
| 560 | Short bio | Alexander Hay | | | | |
| 560 | Board of Trade, Ahoy | Alexander Hay | | | | |
| 561 | Time – A Sonnet | Alexander Hay | | | | |
| 561 | Dandylion Clock – (The) | Alexander Hay | In the days we went a' gipsying | | | |
| 562 | Illektric Leet – (The) | Alexander Hay | Billy O'Booke's the Boy | | | |
| 562 | Short bio | Joseph Swan | Billy O'Booke's the Boy | inventor of incandescent lamp | | |
| 564 | Short bio | John Craggs | | | | |
| 564 | Old cot on the Tyne – (The) ³ | John Craggs | | a mention only | ³ | |
| 564 | M P for Jarra – (The) ³ | John Craggs | | a mention only | ³ | |
| 564 | Letter from Hannah – (The) ³ | John Craggs | | a mention only | ³ | |
| 564 | Lass that sell'd Grozers upon the Aad Bridge – (Th') | John Craggs | | | | |
| 566 | Short bio | Matthew Tate | | | | |
| 566 | Fore Shift – (The) | Matthew Tate | | | | |
| 568 | Short bio | Ralph Dowey | | | | |
| 568 | Picnic Day – (The) | Ralph Dowey | | | | |
| 570 | Part IV Finale | | | | | |
| 570 | a mention of | J W Chater | | printer and publisher of Chater's Annual, Chater's Canny Newcassel Diary, his gold medals and prizes, etc. | ³ | |
| 570 | Wylam Geordy | A. F. of Lead Gate (pseudonym used) | | | | |
| 571 | Short bio | Matthew C. James of Walker | | | | |
| 571 | Stivvison's Centennery | Matthew C. James | | | | |
| 571 | Short bio | Robert Elliott | | | | |
| 571 | Pitman gawn te Parliament – (A) – Extract from | Robert Elliott | | about Thomas Burt MP | | |
| 571 | Pitman in Parliament – (A) – Extract from | Robert Elliott | | about Thomas Burt MP | | |
| 572 | short bio | Mr R. Usher | | | | |
| 572 | Hallayuye Convert | Mr R. Usher | | | | |
| 572 | Short bio | R. J. Wilkinson | | | | |
| 572 | Tommy on the Bridge | R. J. Wilkinson | | | | |
| 573 | Short bio | Unknown – alias "Havadab" | | | | |
| 573 | Ma Singin' Freend | Unknown – alias "Havadab" | | published in the Weekly Chronicle | | |
| 573 | Short bio | Unknown – author of next song "Gone" | | | | |
| 573 | Gone | Unknown – alias "Havadab" | | published in the Weekly Chronicle | | |
| 574 | Short bio | Joseph Crawhall II | | previous editor of the Fisher's Garland | | |
| 574 | Hot-Trod – (The) | Joseph Crawhall II | | appeared in the "Courant" c1889 | | |
| 574 | Wife's Remonstrance – (The) | Joseph Crawhall II | | appeared in the "Courant" | | |
| 575 | Ahd Pitman's Po'try tiv ees Marrah – (The) | anon – but ascribed to Dr Embleton | | | | |
| 575 | Short bio | William Hetherington Shipley – a parachutist | | | | |
| 575 | Short bio | Geordie – pseudonym | | | | |
| 575 | William Hetherington Shipley's Drop frae the Cloods | Geordie – pseudonym of writer | | published in the Shields Gazette | | |
| 576 | short bio | Henry Jackson | | | | |
| 576 | Free Education | Henry Jackson | | | | |
| 576 | short bio | Mr. J. Harbottle | | | | |
| 576 | Newcassel Sang – (A) – or alternatively spelt "Newcastle Sang" | Mr. J. Harbottle | | appeared in "the Weekly Chronicle" c1890-91 | | |
| 577 | Pitman's Song – (The) ³ | Mr. J. Harbottle | | A mention only – A great success in the "Royal" pantomime, 1890 | ³ | |
| 577 | Tyne – Extract from | Mr. J. Harbottle | | Won prize for the "Journal's "Best poem about the Tyne" in 1889 | | |
| 577 | Part V Appendix | | | | | |
| 577 | a mention of – from page 58 | John Shield | | a mention of | | |
| 578 | a mention of – from page 99 ³ | James Stawpert | | a mention of | ³ | |
| 578 | Newcastle on Saturday Night – from page 126 ³ | William Stephenson (senior) | | a mention of | Fr-Tune08 | |
| 578 | Half-Drowned Skipper (The) – from page 153 ³ | first appeared signed as written by "D" | | a mention of | ³ | |
| 578 | Billy Oliver's Ramble – from page 221 ³ | in 1823 edition of Marshall gives Thomas Moore as the author. In 1827 edition it appears as anon | | a mention of | ³ | |
| 578 | Acrostic of FINIS | | | To signify "the end" | | |
| 578 | Walter Scott Press, Newcastle upon Tyne | | | | | |

Notes

¹ – An old traditional song.
³ – Only a brief mention.
A-C1 – According to Thomas Allan's Tyneside Songs and Readings of 1891, the writer is George Cameron.
A-G2 – According to Thomas Allan's Tyneside Songs and Readings of 1891, the writer is Gilchrist.
Br-S6 – According to Brockie's "The Shields Garland", the writer is John Stobbs.
F-A1 – According to Fordyce's Tyne Songster of 1840, the writer is Armstrong.
Fr-Tune7 – According to France's Songs of the Bards of the Tyne – 1850, the tune is "Polly Parker, O".
Fr-Tune8 – According to France's Songs of the Bards of the Tyne – 1850, the tune is "Newcastle Ale".

== See also ==
- Geordie dialect words
- Thomas Allan (publisher)
- The Bishoprick Garland 1834 by Sharpe
- Northumbrian Minstrelsy
- Rhymes of Northern Bards
