= Robert Nunn (songwriter) =

Robert Nunn (1808 – 2 May 1853), better known as Bobby Nunn, was an English fiddler, singer, songwriter and performer in the 19th century. His most famous song is "The Fiery Clock Fyece". A roof slater by trade, after suffering a serious injury that cost him his vision, he was unable to continue employment, taking up music to support his wife and three children.

== Life ==
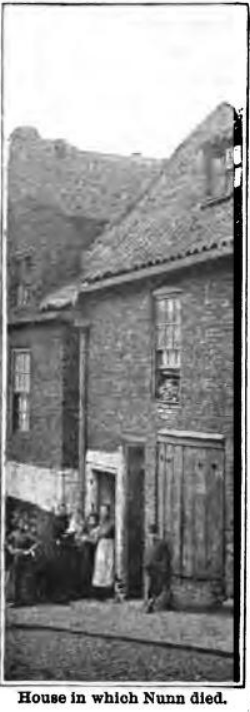

Nunn was born in 1808 in Newcastle. He was a roof slater by trade, but a tragic accident occurred, a fall from the roof of a house after being struck by lightning, causing him to lose his vision and two of his fingers.

After the accident he was unable to continue his trade and turned to his talents as a musician. Fortunately, as a young man, he had played both the triangle and the fiddle in his school orchestra, allowing him to earn his living as an accomplished fiddle player to support his family – a wife, a daughter and two sons. He lived as an entertainer, singing his own songs in the evenings in clubs and small bars.

He was not afraid of hard work; during the day he assisted Jacob Sopwith of Sopwith & Co, Ltd., a manufacturer of cabinets. He loved music, but had a passion for birds; as a hobby he would build cages for them.

Nunn was a regular at pubs, clubs, and similar venues on Tyneside and the adjoining areas. He was heavily built, and a great favourite at parties and entertainment nights at the clubs, pubs and halls. At the high point of his career, it was said that “no party of the kind was considered complete without ‘Bobby’ and his fiddle." Despite his blindness and lack of fingers, his home life seemed to be happy, and he even wrote one of his songs, “Roby’s Wife’s Lamentation”, about it.

He was a skillful performer, famed for his playing-up to women. He was not, however, considered to be highly educated or intellectual. Suffering the effects of a few drinks, some of his songs then contained much innuendo and were rather coarse, which seemed to please his audiences of both women and men. He composed songs to perform, and would sing songs written by others, as well. One of his fellow songwriters, Robert Emery, wrote of him in his song, "The Sandgate Lassie's Lament". Alexander Hay was involved in the location of a manuscript (described as mutilated) of one of his songs.

Nunn died on 2 May 1853 aged 45, at Queen Street, Castle Garth, Newcastle, and was described as "A Newcastle man who had the Burr in all its delightful purity".

== Works ==
His songs were first published in William and Thomas Fordyce's The Tyne Songster in 1840, and later in Allan's Illustrated Edition of Tyneside Songs and Readings.

His songs include:

- "Blind Willie’s Deeth" – appeared in the booklet “Songs of the Tyne Vol 1”, published c1846 and gives reflections on the death of the well-known character William "Blind Willie" Purvis
- "Drucken Bella Roy, O!" – to the tune of "Duncan M'Callaghan" – tells of Bella Roy, a well-known street-vendor of fruit, fish, etc. a once-attractive young woman, but later pitied due to "the drink”
- "Fiery Clock Fyece (The)" (or "The Bonny Clock Fyece") – to the tune of "Coal Hole". The dial of the clock on what would become Newcastle Cathedral, was first illuminated with gas on 5 December 1829. This comic song tells of a pitman, having been drinking, seeing it for the first time and thinking it was afire.
- "Jocker"
- "Keelman's Reasons For Attending Church (The)" – to the tune of "Jemmy Joneson's Whurry", first published c1846, tells of his pondering over the sermon before going back to drinking
- "Luckey's Dream" – to the tune of "Caller Fair"
- "Newcastle Lad (The)" – (or "Newcastle is my Native Place")
- "Pitman and the Blackin' (The)" – possibly his first song – to the tune of "Cole Hole"
- "Poor Aud Horse (The)" – this song appears to have been lost.
- "Quarter of Currans (The)" – this song appears to have been lost.
- "Roby's Wife's Lamentation"
- "St. Nicholas' Church"
- "Sandgate Lass on the Ropery Banks (The)"
- "Sandgate Wife's Nurse Song
- "Workmen's trip (A)" – A song about R & W Hawthorn Workmen's trip to Edinburgh, 1847

== See also ==
- Geordie dialect words
- Benjamin Ward Richardson

== Sources ==
- Allan, Thomas (1972) [1891]. Allan's Illustrated Edition of Tyneside Songs. Frank Graham. ISBN 978-0-902833-75-3.
- Barr, Gordon (23 May 2013). "An Evening of North East Folk Songs". Evening Chronicle. p. 39.
- Harker, D. (1976). Popular Song and Working-Class Consciousness in North-East England (PhD thesis). University of Cambridge.
- Harker, Dave (1981). "The Making of the Tyneside Concert Hall". Popular Music. Folk or Popular Distinctions, Influences, Continuities. 1: 32–36. doi:10.1017/S0261143000000908. JSTOR 853242.
- Richardson, Benjamin Ward; Sopwith, Thomas (15 July 1891). Thomas Sopwith: With Excerpts From His Diary Of Fifty-Seven Years. London: Longmans, Green – via Internet Archive.
- The Tyne Songster, A Choice Selection Of Songs In The Newcastle Dialect. W. and T. Fordyce. 1840.
