= John Atlantic Stephenson =

John Atlantic Stephenson (born 18 June 1829) was a Tyneside businessman, poet and amateur artist in the latter half of the 19th century. He was best known for his recitations.

== Early life ==
Stephenson was born on Waterloo Day, 18 June 1829 in mid-Atlantic.

He started work at Sowerby’s Glass Works, manufacturers of fine decorative glass items, at Gateshead and later moved on to a responsible post as representative for John Rogerson and Co. (who it is believed were brokers and shipping agents)

He was a founder member of the Bewick Club and held the post of honorary treasurer in the 1890s. He was an active member speaking at meetings; his humour, mimicry and use of the local dialects of Tyneside, Wearside, Teesside and Northumberland made him very popular and in demand. Some of his racy pieces also went down well on Tyneside.

He was also a notable artist, and he entered many of his paintings in the Club’s annual exhibitions. These paintings were water colours and covered most aspects of rural life, including local scenes, farmhouses, half-ruined cottages, etc., and urban life in the form of scenes of Old Newcastle, many just before their demolition/removal.

== Family ==
His father, also John Stephenson, was well known locally holding a responsible job as a superintendent in the Tyneside chemical industry. He was on his way to take up his post with the East India Company in India when his son was born, in mid-Atlantic ocean, hence his middle name.

His mother Elizabeth (1804–1878), was a daughter of Elizabeth (née Goirdon) and Dr William Brummell, who was featured in several songs, in one William Purvis (Blind Willie) would sing of him and he is mentioned in William Oliver’s "The Newcassel Props".

They travelled to India in the brig "Argo" and whilst in India at least three other children, Catherine Mary Layton (born c1836), Henry, and Indiana (sometimes referred to as Julianna – maybe at some stage it was transcribed wrongly), were born. The family stayed in India for a period of 12 years before returning to Tyneside, and a further three further children were born after the family returned from India, Leonard, Albert and Alfred.

In the 1841 census, the family were living at Peak Hill (now Ravenscar), Stainton Dale, North Riding of Yorkshire where father was described as an agent for Peek Alum Works.

The 1851 census shows them living at Gateshead with mother as a widow (the father died before Catherine’s wedding in 1860), and according to the 1861 survey, they were living at 11b Elswick East Terrace, Elswick, with mother and just three children, John Atlantic having moved out by now.

=== Paintings ===
- The Dolphin House, Newcastle
- Houses in Silver Street, Newcastle

=== Poems and songs ===
- "Adam and Eve" - A Wearside story
- "Hawks's Men at the Battle of Waterloo"
- "The Postponed Goose" – A Wearside tale
- "A recollection of Ned Corvan"
- "A Tow for nowt" – A Tyneside story – A recitation – about a keelman who wanted a free tow from Jarrow to the "Mushroom" jetty

== See also ==
- Geordie dialect words
- Thomas Allan
- Allan's Illustrated Edition of Tyneside Songs and Readings
