= James Stawpert =

James Stawpert (c. 1775-1814) was a Newcastle based brewer’s clerk/songwriter of the early 19th century. His most famous song is possibly "Newcastle Fair".

== Early life ==
James Stawpert was born c1775, assumedly somewhere in the North East of England.

According to the notes written by John Bell on some of his collected papers, James Stawpert was a clerk with Messrs. Burdon & Rayne, brewers, Quayside, Newcastle

In a volume of odd broadsheets, which were held in the Reference Library, Newcastle, there was a document with a song "In memory of James Stawpert, of Newcastle-upon-Tyne, brewer, who died March 12th, 1814, aged 39 years". The broadsheet does not give the place of his burial.

Both these two scraps of information are given in Allan’s Illustrated Edition of Tyneside songs and this is about all that is known about him.

Just to confuse the issue even more, there were during the same period three other poet/songwriters, each using the initials J.S. John Bell, in one of his volumes of broad-sheets has annotated each song with the correct author — John Shield, John Selkirk, or James Stawpert — Stawpert being the least well-known of the three.

His songs show they were written about 1805. At that date, he would have been working on the Quayside, and have had almost daily contact with Thomas Thompson and Thomas Wilson, and with his fellow clerk, John Selkirk.

James Stawpert was the writer who took up the cudgels in defence of "The Bards of the Tyne" against Charles Purvis.

== Works ==
These include :-

- "John Diggons" – This song appears in both John Bell's Rhymes of Northern Bards and Angus' Garlands. = John Diggons was a country lad singing of Nelson's death, (he refers to Newcastle’s Lord Collingwood)
- Trafalgar's battle – to the tune of “Chapter of Kings” - written to celebrate the British victory at the Battle of Trafalgar, and particularly significant on Tyneside as Nelson's second in command was Newcastle born Lord Collingwood also appear in both books
- Newcastle Fair (or “The Pitman a-drinking of Jacky”) - to the tune of Drops of Brandy – written by J.S., Bell makes it clear that this is Strawpert. - This song tells of the drunken frolics of a young man who, finding the brandy too expensive, was persuaded to try a ”drop o' wor Jacky” (being the local term for Gin, which at that period was cheaper than beer) – written c1811

None of the above are written in Geordie dialect, although they show their northern origin.

== See also ==
- Geordie dialect words
