= John Taylor (Geordie songwriter) =

19th-century English songwriter and poet

- Born: 1840; Dunston, Gateshead, England
- Died: 24 September 1891 (age 51)
- Occupations: Songwriter, poet

John Taylor (1840–1891) was an English songwriter and poet (whose material won many prizes) and an accomplished artist and engraver.

== Early life ==
John Taylor was born in 1840 in Dunston, Gateshead, (which at the time was in County Durham but is now in Tyne and Wear).

John Taylor began adult life as a clerk at the Newcastle Central Station. After several years he became impatient at not gaining, in his mind, sufficient promotion, and left to "better himself" as a traveller for a brewery. Like many other short cuts this, in time, he found had its drawbacks, and possibly the slower progress of the railway might in the end have been better.

He was a prolific writer of songs and many won prizes in the competitions run by both John W Chater and Ward's Almanacs (Ward's Directory of Newcastle upon Tyne and the Adjacent Villages; Together with an Almanac, a Town and County Guide and a Commercial Advertiser).

It was to him Joe Wilson allegedly said whilst talking in the Adelaide Hotel, "Jack, ye can write a sang aboot as weel as me, but yor sangs divn't sing, an' mine dis."

He was also a first-class and versatile artist, as was his predecessor Edward Corvan, and an accomplished wood-engraver providing the plates used for the pictures of William Purvis (Blind Willie), Captain Benjamin Starky, Joseph Philip Robson, and Geordy Black, the character played by Rowland Harrison, in Thomas Allan’s Illustrated Edition of Tyneside Songs and Readings of 1891.

== Family ==
His father was an employee of the North Eastern Railway Company and was selected by the patentee to operate the machine which printed the first standard railway ticket

== Death ==
John Taylor died on 24 September 1891, aged 51, and was buried in Dunston Churchyard.

== Works ==
These include:

- Harry Clasper and his Testimonial
- Bob Chambers, champion sculler of the world
- The Flay Craw – or Pee Dee’s Mishap – to the tune of Warkworth Feast

== See also ==
- Allan's Illustrated Edition of Tyneside Songs and Readings
- Geordie dialect words
- John W Chater
- Thomas Allan
