= Ralph Dowey =

- Born: October 1844; Backworth
- Died: 1909 (aged 64–65)
- Occupations: songwriter and poet

Ralph Dowey (1844 – 1909) was a Northumberland born miner, songwriter and poet.

Ralph Dowey was born in October 1844 at 42 South Row, West Holywell, a small Colliery village approx. 4 miles west of Whitley Bay, which at the time was in the county of Northumberland. He was a miner by trade, like so many Geordie songwriters

Songwriting was a hobby, and according to Thomas Allan in his Illustrated Edition of Tyneside Songs and Readings won at least 8 prizes for his songs in the various North Eastern songwriting competitions. His works appeared in Frazer's and Tweed's Almanacs and the Blyth Weekly News.

In 1865 he married Hannah Elizabeth Dowson (b1844) and they had at least 2 children John R (b1869), Mary A (b1877). He died in Gateshead in 1909.

His many works include "The Picnic Day" which was first published in the Blyth Weekly News in 1891 and tells of a family dressing up for the miners' picnic in Morpeth. The Picnic was an annual day of celebration for miners and their families organised by the Northumberland Miners' Association.

== See also ==
Geordie dialect words
Thomas Allan
Allan's Illustrated Edition of Tyneside Songs and Readings
