= John Harbottle =

British songwriter (c.1851–??)

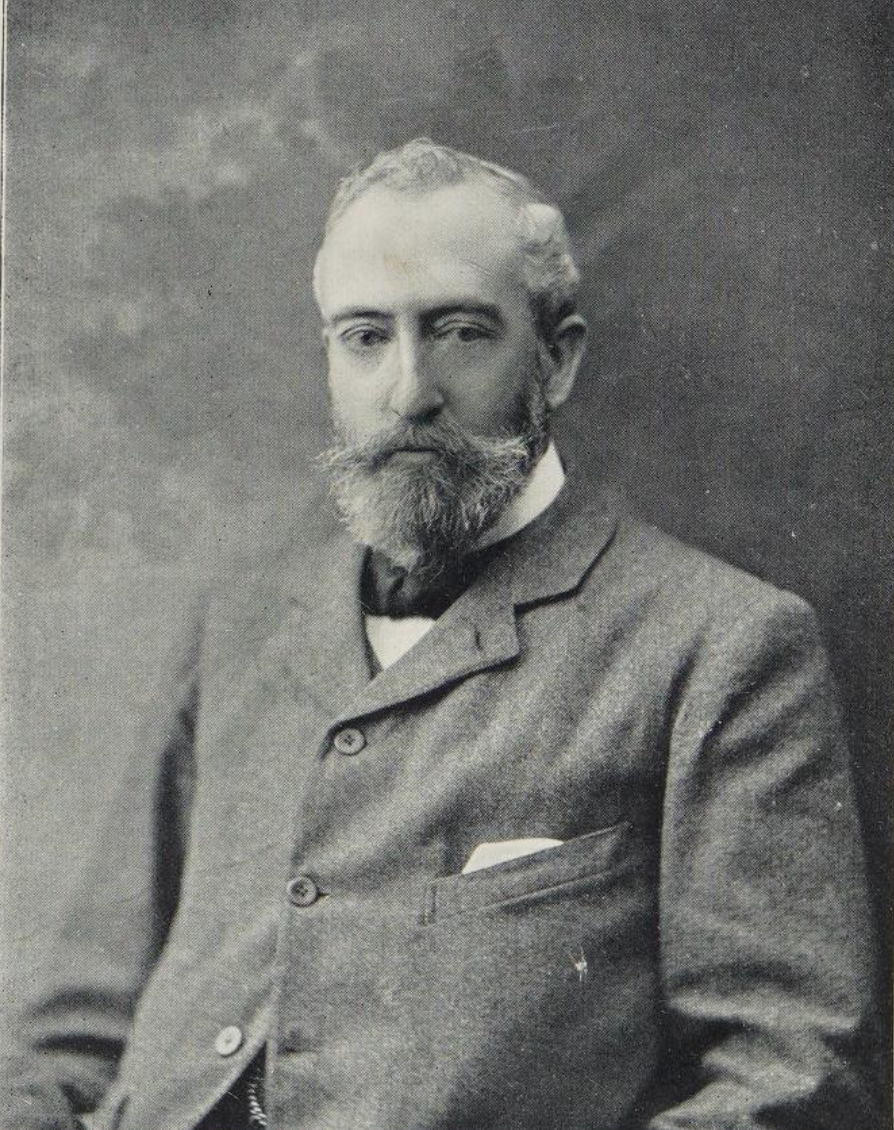
John Harbottle

John Harbottle (born c. 1851) was a Newcastle businessman, songwriter and angler in the late 19th century. He was also an active member of the Northumberland and Newcastle Angling Clubs and singer/performer at the club meetings. His most famous song is probably "Streams of the North" which won the local newspaper prize in 1891.

== Life ==
John Harbottle was born in about 1851 in Newcastle, the eldest son of Mr Thomas Harbottle, a respected tradesman who carried on business also in Newcastle.]

He took up poetry at a very young age and had written many poems and acrostics before he reached his twenties.

His poems appeared on a regular basis in the local Newcastle newspapers, and when the Northern Weekly Leader (published from 9 Feb 1884 until 27 Dec 1919), in 1889, ran a competition offering a prize for the best poem about the River Tyne, John Harbottle entered his "Streams of the North" and won the first prize. This poem is by far his most comprehensive effort.

He wrote most of his works in the local Geordie dialect, either with the more gentle Northumbrian brogue, of the more broad Newcastle brogue.

He was an extremely enthusiastic angler, fishing in most of the local rivers and streams, but mainly in the Coquet, Tyne and Tweed and wrote many songs about his (and other people’s) exploits on the rivers. He was an active member of the Northumberland Angling Club, and also wrote many, sometimes racy, poems and songs intended to be used at their annual meetings.

== Works ==
These include :-

- A Newcassel Sang or alternatively spelt "A Newcastle Sang", first appeared in the Weekly Chronicle c1890-91 and was described at the time as a "racy" song
- Streams of the North, A poem about the Tyne, which won the first prize in 1889 in the newspaper competition. The poem describes the Tyne from its source to the sea
- The Pitman’s Song – which was a great hit in the 1890 Pantomime at the Theatre Royal, Newcastle
- The Dawn of Morning – a short poem.
- A song to the Coquet – a song which sings the praises of his beautiful stream
- The Fisher’s Courtship – a slightly humorous poem showing the comparisons between the lover and the fisherman.
- The Angler's Courtship
- Several broadsheets and Chapbooks entitled "Fishing Songs sung at the Annual Meetings of the Newcastle Fishing Club"
- A Fisher's Garland, 1904

== See also ==
- Geordie dialect words
- Thomas Allan
- Allan's Illustrated Edition of Tyneside Songs and Readings
