= R. Usher (songwriter) =

English songwriter

R Usher (lived in the mid-19th century) was born in Felling. He was a Tyneside songwriter, who, according to the information given by Thomas Allan on page 572 of his Allan's Illustrated Edition of Tyneside Songs and Readings, published in 1891, has written a good many songs, which have been printed in slip form. He was a member of The Salvation Army (or, as he calls them, The Hallayuyes) and sang in their local church choir.

Nothing more appears to be known of this person, or his life.

Among the many works published are the following, all of which are written in Geordie dialect:

- "Hallayuye Convert", sung to the tune of "Pawnshop Bleezin", tells how, after listening at The Salvation Army open-air meeting, he follows them to their '* Mishin Hall", is impressed and is invited to join.
- "Bonniest young lass o' Wardley", sung to the tune of "Merrily danced the Quaker's wife", is a typical love song of the era telling about the young lass from (what was then) a small village of Wardley.
- Mick, what myed ye gan away?, sung to the tune of "Washing Day", tells of the friends of a young pitman lamenting the fact that he is changing jobs, albeit that he is moving from Gateshead Fell to a better job at Boldon Colliery.

== See also ==
- Geordie dialect words
- Thomas Allan
- Allan's Illustrated Edition of Tyneside Songs and Readings
