= James Horsley =

James Horsley may refer to:

- James Horsley (cricketer)
- James Horsley (songwriter)
