= R. J. Wilkinson =

Ralph John Wilkinson (1846 – 1914) was an English bookseller from Newcastle active in the late 19th and early 20th century. and songwriter, with premises in the Market.

Wilkinson was born and died in Newcastle. He wrote several songs and in 1886 published a songbook of his own works entitled A Collection of dialect and other songs.

One of these songs "Tommy On the Bridge", in the Geordie dialect, is about one of the local characters Tommy Ferns and appears in Thomas Allan's Illustrated Edition of Tyneside Songs and Readings published in 1891

== See also ==
- Geordie dialect words
- Thomas Allan
- Allan's Illustrated Edition of Tyneside Songs and Readings
