= Thomas Kerr (writer and songwriter) =

English writer, journalist and songwriter

Thomas Kerr was a Tyneside writer, journalist and songwriter of the middle and late 19th century.

== Details ==
Kerr was born in Black Gate, Newcastle, in the shadow of the old castle. He was a Tyneside writer, journalist and songwriter, who lived and worked in Newcastle upon Tyne for many of his early years and (according to Thomas Allan on page 555 of his Illustrated Edition of Tyneside Songs and Readings) was a good friend of Joe Wilson, the Tyneside Music Hall entertainer.

Around 1866 he moved to Blyth, where he wrote occasionally as a reporter for the Blyth Weekly News. He was also one of the regular writers for a period of over seven years of the "An Awd Trimmer" column. The articles which he wrote for this column included several hundred local songs, some his own writing, some by others.

While at Blyth he entered several of the competition run by John W. Chater in his publications, winning several prizes, amongst them a gold medal for the best local song for Chater’s Annual.

Around 1879 he moved back to Newcastle to full-time employment with a local daily newspaper.

== Works ==
The majority were written in the local Geordie dialect and include :-

- Aw's glad the Strike's Duin, sung to the tune of "It's time to get up"
- Jimmy's brocken oot, sung to the tune of "The row upon the stairs" (The Gold Medal winner in "Keelmin's comic annewal, for 1871"
- When the Good Times cum Agyen, sung to the tune of "The Captain with the whiskers"

== See also ==
- Geordie dialect words
- Thomas Allan
- Allan's Illustrated Edition of Tyneside Songs and Readings
