= David Hobkirk =

David Hobkirk was a Tyneside poet and songwriter in the early to middle 19th century.

He, like William Oliver and Mr P. Galloway, appeared to have been a member of the local Corinthian Society (a group of businessmen who regularly met in the local ale-houses to talk business and friendship).

He wrote numerous works on many and varied topics and several books of his works were published. These include :-

1. Miscellaneous Poems by David Hobkirk, 1828, which was reprinted in 2011
2. The Florentine Brothers and other poems, 1832. A review of which, published in The Athenæum Journal of 1832, suggested that "Some of his works are fuller of words than of meaning ... he be advised to lay the scene of his next poem near Newcastle, and make his characters out of the ladies and gentlemen around; he will find all he wants, without wetting his feet in long excursions ... but because we dislike his theme, we are not about to cut up his verses: we have no such intentions, in truth we think many of his strains very sweet and beautiful….". This book included "The Florentine Brothers" and "The Miniature" among others

He also wrote "The praise of Corinth and the local Corinthians" given on 4 June 1827, and "To the Memory of R. Young", which appeared on pages 233 and 232 in Thomas Allan's Illustrated Edition of Tyneside Songs and Readings. Both these works, like several others, were signed using his initials "D.GH".

Otherwise very little information is available.

== See also ==
- Geordie dialect words
- Thomas Allan
- Allan's Illustrated Edition of Tyneside Songs and Readings
