= William Shipley (disambiguation) =

William Shipley was an English drawing master and social reformer.

William Shipley may also refer to:

- Wil Shipley, Macintosh software developer
- William Shipley (linguist), American linguist of the Maidu language
- William Davies Shipley, Anglican Dean of St Asaph, prosecuted for seditious libel
- William Hetherington Shipley, 19th-century painter, decorator and early pioneer in ballooning and parachuting
