= Richard Heslop =

Richard Heslop may refer to:

- Richard Heslop (director), British director of music videos and films
- Richard Henry Heslop, Special Operations Executive agent
- Richard Oliver Heslop, English lexicographer, antiquarian and songwriter, see
