= A Collection of original local songs =

Folk songs from the Geordie area of England

A Collection of Original Local Songs (full title - “A Collection of original local songs by Thomas Marshall – Printed for the author by Wm Fordyce, Dean Street, Newcastle 1829) is a Chapbook of Geordie folk song consisting of eleven songs written by Thomas Marshall, published in 1829, by the author himself.

== The publication ==
Thomas Marshall wrote all the songs.

A set of the original documents are retained in the archives of Gateshead Council. .

== Contents ==
Are as below :-

page	title	tune	brief description	note	ref
1	assume front cover				
2	assume inner cover				
3 to 4	Blind Willie's jubilee	Bold Dragoon	A song to celebrate Blind Willy’s 50th birthday and ensuing party		
5	unknown				
6 to 8	Markie's grandie (or Richie's mistake)	Barbara Bell	A comic song about mistaking the name of a public house		
8 to 10	Blind Willie, versus Billy Scott	Fie, let's away to the Bridal	A song about a fight between these two local “eccentrics”		
10 to 12	Ralphey and the broker	Good Morning to your night-cap	A song about a defective chest ordered from a broker (or joiner)		
12 to 13	Heeltap's disaster	Post-mun	A song about a greedy shoemaker		
13 to 16	Euphys Coronation	Arthur McBride			
18 to 19	Ralphey's views fra the spire	Betsey Baker	This song describes the amazing view from the spire of St. Nicholas Church in Newcastle claiming he could see all the way to London		
16 to 18	Visit to Swalwell	Betsey Baker	Song about a group of folk led by a band setting out from Newcastle to go to Swalwell for a 'merry night'		
20 to 21	Tars and skippers	Derry Down	A song written after tales of “body snatcher” like Burke & Hare, tells of a group of people guarding a corpse		
21 to ?	Sons of Britannia	Battle of Vittoria			

== See also ==
Geordie dialect words
