= William Hetherington Shipley =

William Hetherington Shipley was a 19th-century painter and decorator based in South Shields who was also an early pioneer in the world of ballooning and parachuting

== Details ==
Shipley was born in South Shields in 1853. He was the son of Joseph Shipley (b. 1823) and Isabel (née Hetherington). At one period he lived in John Clay Street, South Shields.

He was apprenticed in the merchant marine, but the log books of his voyages (1870–1871) list him on every page for committing every misdemeanour in the sailing book. At some time during his early career he became a painter and decorator (he is described as such in Thomas Allan's Illustrated Edition of Tyneside Songs and Readings, published in 1891, so balloon jumping was quite in keeping with his character

At the time both ballooning, but more particularly, parachuting were unheard of novelties, at the forefront of aviation, and as such attracted much interest and curiosity wherever they took place.

In spring 1890, he made two parachute descents from a balloon floating above the town. He made his first balloon ascent from a field in Westoe on 5 April 1890 and after a successful flight (reaching, it is said, the height of 6000 feet) came down at Cleadon. On 5 April he made a particularly rash jump, descending from (so it is said) 15,000 feet. Shipley, dressed showily in dark velvet, landed on the roof of a house in John Williamson Street.

An article appeared about 10 days later in the South Shields Daily Gazette which included a poem (of which it was said contained 9 verses) written by someone using the pseudonym "Geordie". The first verses were also published in Allan's Illustrated Edition of Tyneside Songs and Readings. Queries have been raised regarding the accuracy of the heights given in the report.

Shipley continued with his ballooning and parachuting and carried out a jump descending on Newcastle Town Moor in about 1896.

He was sufficiently proficient, however, to later be engaged by the Hudson Soap Co. to advertise its soap.

== See also ==
- Geordie dialect words
