= Green's Balloon at Newcastle =

"Green’s Balloon" was a balloon flown by a Mr Green. It took to the skies over Newcastle four times in the Spring/Summer of 1825 and three times in September 1831. This in itself was a remarkable achievement in the days when travel was usually by foot, or horse, or by 1831 rail, but rail was still restricted to a few small areas of the country.

== Details ==
At the time there were a family of Balloonists from London, Charles Green, who flew from London to Weilburg, Duchy of Nassau (Germany) in 1836 and by the time he retired in 1852, he had flown in a balloon more than 500 times. He had a son George who was born in 1807 and made 83 ascents. It is not certain that this family are the ones making the Newcastle ascents.

The ascents were recorded in short comments in both Allan's Illustrated Edition of Tyneside Songs and Readings of 1891 (on page 222) and France's Songs of the Bards of the Tyne – 1850 (on page c331).

== Ascents ==
On Wednesday 11 May 1825, George and C Green ascended from Nun's Field in Newcastle. It was cloudy and they were soon lost to the gathered spectators. They subsequently descended slightly to gratify the throngs before re-ascending and eventually landing at Newbiggen (a distance of approx 4 miles)

On Whit Monday, 23 May, they again lifted off from the same spot, but due to a faulty valve made a forced landing at Low Elswick White-Lead Works, damaging the basket in the process.

Not to be beaten, they tried again a week later on Monday, 30 May, also from Nun's Field, and ascended almost vertically to the great delight of the onlookers, before heading south and landing near the Tontine Inn, near Northallerton in North Yorkshire, almost 50 miles away

The balloon was taken to Stockton where another 45-minute flight took place on 16 June. George Green made a shorter 13-minute flight from Palace Green, Durham on 5 July and reached a height 2,200 feet.

On Race Thursday 14 July both George Green and W Green made a fourth flight from the Nun's Field. The weather was perfect and after 20 minutes in the air they landed near (then known as) Long Benton, approx 3 miles away.

There were great celebrations all over the country on 8 September 1831, The day of King William IV's coronation. In Newcastle, Green and his companion, a Major Callender, lifted off again, this time from Spittal Field. It was Green's 96th flight in total. The balloon hovered for some time before being carried of westerly, landing after a flight of approx. 30 minutes and 8 miles, at Close House, near Heddon-on-the-Wall.

On 12 September, Green and Callendar again ascended, this time from the yard of the gas company in Manors, Newcastle. The weather on the day was quite favourable and the huge crowd took over virtually every space in the areas which had a view of the yard. After hovering for a considerable time, the balloon slowly drifted first West, and then to the North-East and after about an hour, landed 3 miles away in Low Gosforth.

On 19 September, Green again ascended, but this time he had a passenger, a Miss Oyston, daughter of a South Shields Brickmaker, and the first female to "fly" from Newcastle. The flight took off from the Corporation Depot at Manors, Newcastle, lasted approx. 35 minutes, landing in a field, which was known locally as Saltwick Hawes, near Stannington.

== See also ==
- Geordie dialect words
