= Thomas Marshall (songwriter) =

Thomas Marshall (c. 1806 – 1866) was a Tyneside songwriter of popular songs in the early and middle 19th century. His most well-known song is probably "Euphys Coronation".

== Early life ==
Thomas Marshall was born in c. 1806 in Newcastle, it is thought in Silver Street (long since demolished).

He started work as an apprentice brush-maker with a Mr Laidler (or Laidlaw) of Laidlaw & Nicholson, whose business at the time was located in Carpenter’s Tower (site unknown), later moved to Pilgrim Street and then became Byer’s & Co. He continued working for the same company for many years at his trade as a journeyman, becoming a foreman brush-maker.

He would only be in his early twenties when in 1829 he published a collection of his songs, amounting to 24 pages filled with humour. The Chapbook was called A Collection of original local songs; it was "Printed for the author by Wm Fordyce, Dean Street, Newcastle 1829"

In the early 19th century, Newcastle had quite a collection of local eccentrics (also referred to as "worthies", and John Marshall mentioned them, and their peculiarities, in many of the songs.

== Marriage ==
The name of his wife is unknown, but according to the 1872 edition of "Allan’s Illustrated Edition of Tyneside songs" he had just one son, who predeceased him.

== Later life ==
According to the comments in this 1972 edition of Allan’s Illustrated Edition of Tyneside Songs – "In appearance he was slight, dark, and a little under the middle height. At his work he would often break out with William Watson's "Thumping Luck to yon Town," a favourite song of his".

He appeared to write very little as he got older, but he must have retained his interest in music, as for years he was one of the Guild of Bell-ringers of All Saints’ Church.

He died suddenly (he had been working two days before) on 30 December 1866, at the age of a little over 60. At his home in Shield Street (an area now completely re-developed), Shieldfield, Newcastle from a paralytic attack.

He was buried at All Saints' cemetery on 2 January 1867 in an unmarked grave.

== Legacy ==
Thomas Marshall was a Geordie born and bred; he wrote using the local Geordie dialect.

== Works ==
These include:

- Blind Willie, versus Billy Scott – A song about a fight between these two local "eccentrics"
- Blind Willie's jubilee – To the tune of "Bold Dragoon" – A song top celebrate Blind Willy’s 50th birthday and ensuing party
- Heeltap's disaster – A song about a greedy shoemaker
- Markie's grandie; or, Richie's mistake – This is a comic song about mistaking the name of a public house
- Ralphey and the broker – This is a song about a defective chest ordered from a broker ( or joiner)
- Ralphey's views fra the spire – This song describes the amazing view from the spire of St. Nicholas Church in Newcastle claiming he could see all the way to London. The entry fee of half a crown (or 12½ pence) is nearly £8.00 by today’s value)
- Tars and skippers – A song written after tales of "body snatcher" like Burke & Hare, tells of a group of people guarding a corpse
- Visit to Swalwell – Song about a group of folk led by a band setting out from Newcastle to go to Swalwell for a 'merry night
- Euphys Coronation

== See also ==
Geordie dialect words
