= Matthew Tate =

English "pitman poet", coal miner and poet

Matthew Tate (1837-1920) was an English poet and songwriter, who spent much of his adult life working as a coal miner and living in Blyth, Northumberland.

== Early life ==
Matthew Tate was born on 5 September 1837 in Benton Square, Benton, Newcastle. His family were miners as were many of their antecedents.

He began writing seriously in 1854 when only 17 years old. In 1874, He published his first book of poetry, followed later by "Poems, Songs and Ballads by Matthew Tate". He was also a contributor to the arts sections of the local newspapers and periodicals. He lived all his life in Northumberland. He lived in Waterloo, Blyth for many years.

== Works ==
These include :-

=== Collections ===
- A book entitled "Stray Blossom" published c1874

A book of 184 pages entitled "Poems, songs and ballads by Matthew Tate" published 1898 and printed by Alder & Co., Ridley Street, Blyth. This book begins with a story of conditions in the mines and also contained "The Hartley Pit Disaster."

=== Songs and poems ===
- The Fore Shift, appears in Allan's Illustrated Edition of Tyneside Songs on page 566 previously printed in The Newcastle Weekly Chronicle in 1886.
- Thi bussen ov thi tyup (see Note 1) - the copy is a cutting from an unidentified publication dated 7 October 1893
- The Hartley Pit Disaster – a poem about the tragic events of 1862 when over 200 miners were killed

== Notes ==
An old mining tradition was for the horn of a tup (a male sheep, a ram) to be sent to the surface with every twentieth waggon of coal, as a way of counting the loads. A further tradition was that the last corve or corf (being a basket, tub, waggon or other container full) to be taken to the surface on the last day of the year, also called "the tup" involved great ceremony. The young boys working underground would light candles and after the tup’s horn had been affixed to the top of the coalk, the load was "buss’d" or "drest" when the lads placed their candles into the coal. The whole lighted tup was then, on instruction from the onsetter of "send away" would be raised to the surface. The word "tyup" in the song refers to this last corve. Long before this song was written, This tradition had all but died out around the middle of 19th century, and would have been a thing of the past long before this song was written

== See also ==
- Allan's Illustrated Edition of Tyneside Songs and Readings
- Geordie dialect words
