= Alexander Hay (songwriter) =

Alexander Hay (1826 – post 1891) was a Newcastle songwriter and poet of the 19th century. His most famous song was probably "Board of Trade, Ahoy!"

== Life ==
Alexander Hay was born in Newcastle on 11 December 1826.

After serving out his apprenticeship to a cabinet-maker, his restless nature came to the fore and he began a long period of roving. He first went to sea as a ship’s carpenter, followed by a spell in Liverpool as a tutor in a school, and was connected with the press whilst in Liverpool. He later worked in London, being involved in the construction of the Great Exhibition of 1862, and continuing his work as a journalist.

He returned to Newcastle and became active in the community. He was involved in local historical research into the location of graves of writers. He joined in the search at Ballast Hills burial grounds and St Johns’ Westgate Hill graveyard, assisting in the location of the graves of John Selkirk, Robert Gilchrist and Thomas Thompson. He was also involved in the search for the location of a manuscript (described as mutilated) of a song by Robert Nunn.

He eagerly assisted in the historical facts presented in "Allan’s Illustrated Edition of Tyneside songs".

In 1856, Hay contributed to the Northern Poetic Keepsake together with fellow contributors, Thomas Doubleday, Robert White, L Goodchild, R. Storey, and R. Fisher (who was both contributor and publisher).

He also contributed numerous articles to the Newcastle press, both in verse and prose.

=== The Board of Trade, Ahoy ! ===
William Clark Russell, the popular American nautical novelist, on pages ix and x of the preface to his 1883 book "Sailor’s Language, writes

- "A ship’s carpenter once told me that he was clapped in irons and lay manacled for six weeks, in a voyage to China for writing the words of a song which the sailors sang on every occasion when the captain was on deck. He gave me a copy of the words, which I found to be a rude enumeration of Jack's troubles, every stanza winding up with a shout of “Board of Trade, ahoy !”

Alexander Hay was the carpenter who wrote and gave William Clark Russell the song. Russell actually printed several verses in the preface to his book, but “stretched the truth a little” as although Hay was brutalised, the use of irons was only threatened.

Later, Alexander Hay attended a public meeting in the London district of Limehouse at which Samuel Plimsoll presided, and he had the honour of reciting “Board of Trade, ahoy !"

== Works ==
Among his many works, mainly in broad Geordie dialect, are the following :-

- The Dandylion Clock – written c1879
- The Illektric Leet – about Mr J Swan, the inventor of the incandescent light lamp. Swan’s Gateshead home was the first in the world to be lit with electric light, while The Literary and Philosophical Society of Newcastle became the first public room to be lit by electricity on the 20th October, 1880.
- Board of trade, ahoy!
- The Shoddy Ship – appeared in “The Nautical Magazine”

And among the poems :-

- The sonnet "Time”

== See also ==
Geordie dialect words
