= North Sunderland =

Village in Northumberland, England

Coordinates: 55.577°N 1.660°W

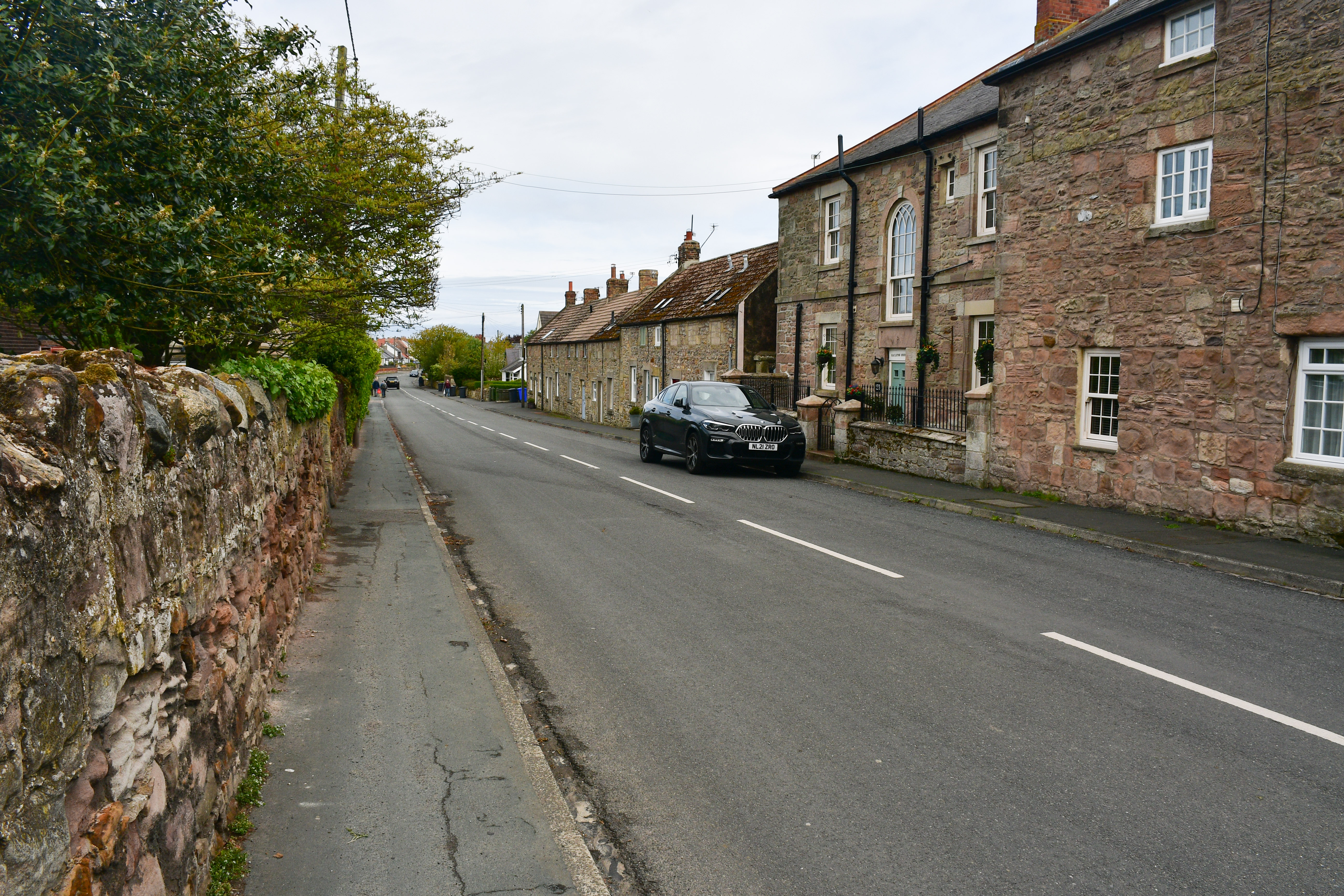

- Location within Northumberland
- Population: 1,803 (2001 census)
- OS grid reference: NU215315
- Unitary authority: Northumberland
- Ceremonial county: Northumberland
- Region: North East
- Country: England
- Sovereign state: United Kingdom
- Post town: SEAHOUSES
- Postcode district: NE68
- Police: Northumbria
- Fire: Northumberland
- Ambulance: North East
- UK Parliament: North Northumberland

North Sunderland is a fishing village on the coast of Northumberland, England, and adjacent to Seahouses. The population of the civil parish was 1,803 at the 2001 census, increasing to 1,959 at the 2011 Census.

== Toponymy ==
The name North Sunderland may be of Old English origin, and differently-derived to the much larger Sunderland 60 miles to its south. The first element is sūðer, meaning "south, southern", while the second is land, "land". The name means "southern-land", and is analogous in its derivation to Sutherland in Scotland.

== History ==
Historically, the inland village of North Sunderland grew significantly when the nearby coast was developed as a harbour. Houses were built, particularly in connection with the herring fishery. Community growth became concentrated around these sea-houses, eventually being recognised under the name Seahouses. In practice, there is no recognisable boundary between the two.

== Governance ==
North Sunderland and Seahouses are within the civil parish of North Sunderland and the Northumberland County Council electoral division of Bamburgh. The parliamentary constituency was Berwick-upon-Tweed until this was abolished in the 2024 UK General Election. North Sunderland and Seahouses now fall within the North Northumberland parliamentary constituency.

== Notable People ==
John Craggs (songwriter)
