= James Rewcastle =

British songwriter

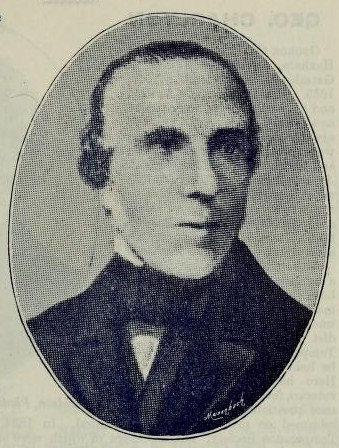

James Rewcastle (c.1802–1867) was the first secretary of the Newcastle Temperance movement, and a songwriter born in the Newcastle area. His most well-known song is possibly "Jackey and Jenny".

== Early life ==
James Rewcastle was born c. 1802 (some suggest 1798) in (or in the neighbourhood of, Newcastle, Northumberland.

Little is known of his early life, but he was a printer by trade and also had a bookshop in Dean Street, Newcastle. He was a keen supporter of the Temperance movement and was there at the start of the movement in Newcastle. He published one of their earliest publications, the Temperance Advocate.

When minister Edwin Paxton Hood, who during his years held several pastorates, began to liven up his temperance meetings with his own songs, including "As I 'woke one morning" and "It was in dark December" and others, James Rewcastle decided that he too could do that, and penned several tunes, the best known being "Jackey and Jenny". His songs appear to have been sung by a co-worker at the movement, Fenwick Pickup.

== Marriage ==
It has been noted in some places that he married a Mary Bainbridge, but there is very little corroborative evidence for this.

== Later life ==
As he got older James Rewcastle retired from bookselling, and took on a responsible job, working for the local (Newcastle) Corporation. He died 4 October 1867, aged 65, and was buried at St. John's Cemetery (which had just recently opened 10 years before, to replace St. John's Churchyard, which closed at the same time).

== Legacy ==
His songs and recitations do not appear ever to have been issued in a collected form.

== Works ==
These include :-
One of the few surviving songs was “Jackey and Jenny”, written in the local Geordie dialect. And sung to the tune of “Come, fie, let us a' to the Bridal”

- A paper of 25 pages entitled ”An argument on the present crisis in Wesleyan Methodism respectfully addressed to the president: and submitted to the consideration of the preachers and lay members of the committees of the Conference, held in Newcastle-upon-Tyne, 1851” was written by James Rewcastle and published by Thomas Pallister Barkas in 1851.
- A book entitled “A Record of the Great Fire in Newcastle and Gateshead” was also written by James Rewcastle about the same time.

Although there is very little cross referencing in the sources of these last two, it is assumed that they do refer to the same James Rewcastle.

== See also ==
- Geordie dialect words
