= Richard Oliver Heslop =

Businessman, author, historian, lexicologist, lexicographer, songwriter, poet

Richard Oliver Heslop (1842–1916) was a British businessman, author, historian, lexicologist, lexicographer, songwriter and poet. His most famous work is the two-volume "Northumberland Words".

== Details ==
Richard Oliver Heslop was born 14 March 1842 in Newcastle upon Tyne, and was educated at The Old Grammar School. He was a businessman, and a joint owner of an Iron Merchants and Engineers, Heslop, Wilson and Budden, of 26 Sandhill and at the Stock Bridge. The company went into administration (or "Liquidation by arrangement or composition with creditors") according to The London Gazette of 6 November 1874.

He served as president of the Literary and Philosophical Society of Newcastle upon Tyne from 1914 until 1916.

He compiled several books and wrote numerous papers on the subject of the North East England, the Northumberland and Geordie dialect and use of words. His best known and most popular was “'Northumberland Words' (published in 2 volumes in 1893-4)“, the first real dialect dictionary of Geordie words and their meanings, and a set of monumental works running to over 800 Pages.

The dictionary was serialised weekly in the Evening Chronicle in the 1880s under the heading of “'Northumberland Words". It was only later that the subtitle “'A glossary of words used in the County of Northumberland ---- etc" was added

He also wrote several poems and songs as a hobby and form of relaxation during his writing of the "Northumberland Words".

During his life, several addresses are given including (in 1874) 93 Gloster Street, and (in 1894) Akenside Hill, Newcastle upon Tyne.

He was awarded the honorary degree of Master of Arts (MA) from the University of Durham in September 1901.

Heslop died in 1916 aged 72.

== Works ==
=== Songs ===
- Rhymes and Aad Names – to the tune of Home, sweet, home
- Howdon for Jarrow, loup oot! – to the tune of Cappy
- New sang tiv an aad teun
- Newcastle toon née mair – to the tune of Nee good luck aboot the hoose
- Thor's nowt see queer as folk – to the tune of The whistling thief
- Aad bat (The) – to the tune of Canny Newcassel
- Gift o' the gob (The) – to the tune of Drops O' Brandy
- A tow for Nowt – to the tune of The One-Horse Shay
- The Singin' Hinney – to the tune of The One-Horse Shay
- The Tyneside Chorus – first published in the Newcastle Weekly Chronicle in 1886

=== Books ===
- Geordy's last and other songs – written by Harry Haldane (which was a pseudonym used by Heslop) – published 1879
- Northumberland Words – A Glossary of Words Used in the County of Northumberland And on the Tyneside – Volume I – published 1893–94
- Northumberland Words – A Glossary of Words Used in the County of Northumberland And on the Tyneside – Volume 2 – published 1893–94
- A bibliographical list of works illustrative of the dialect of Northumberland, (Published for the English Dialect Society by H. Frowde, Oxford University Press, 1896 – 40 pages – written by Harry Haldane
- A Bibliographical List of Words illustrative of the Dialect of Northumberland ???
- Allan's Illustrated Edition of Tyneside songs and readings is dedicated to Richard Oliver Heslop, Esq. as an acknowledgement of his labours on "Northumberland Words"

=== Papers, articles and similar ===
- There were numerous items appearing in the annual "Archaeologia aeliana, or, Miscellaneous tracts relating to antiquity" being the periodical of, and published by, The Society of Antiquaries of Newcastle upon Tyne, of which R. O. Heslop was, at various times, council member, curator, honorary curator and secretary. Including :-
  - The Permian People of North Durham 1884 – 10 pages in Volume x (page 100)
  - Documents relating to an incident at Newcastle after the Battle of Flodden – 1906 of 11 pages
  - Notes on the street nomenclature of Newcastle upon Tyne: In the survey of the town, shown on the plan of Thomas Oliver, 1830 – published 1909 – 8 pages)
  - Bolbec Hall – published 1909 – 4 pages
  - Newcastle upon Tyne: Episodes in its history – published 1911 – 21 pages
  - The market cross of Newcastle, commonly called "The white cross" – published 1911 – 4 pages
  - minor comment on page 180 – Volume XVI published in 1894
  - minor comment on page xix – Third series, Volume VI. Published in 1910
- Newcastle upon Tyne: episodes in its history – a paper given on a visit to the representatives of the Institute of Cleansing Superintendents, fourteenth annual conference, at Newcastle upon Tyne, July 1911?

== See also ==
- Geordie dialect words
- Thomas Allan
