= Broom Buzzems =

Song

"Broom Buzzem"

Song
- Language: English (Geordie)
- Written: Unknown
- Songwriter: William (Blind Willie) Purvis (possibly)

"Buy Broom Buzzems" (or "Buy Broom Besums") is a song attributed by many to William Purvis, probably better known as "Blind Willie" (1752–1832), a Tyneside songwriter and performer in the end of the 18th and start of the 19th century, and is considered by many to be his piece de resistance.

== Possible authorship ==
William Purvis is described as the writer/composer of this piece by many books and journals, while others dispute this. There is no real evidence either way. But what can be said is that he made it his own and he was in the habit of adding new verses and removing old verses as it suited him. These verses may have been written by himself or by others for him, and usually had no connection with the original theme. There are several other versions of the song. One version was popular just over the border in Southern Scotland and of which Rabbie Burns, for one, knew and in 1796 wrote a satirical piece, Buy Braw Troggin, set to the tune. Another version, The Besom Maker or Green Besoms, although it shares a refrain with this song, is otherwise quite different (the Roud Index assigns it number 910) and can be seen, as The Besom Maker, at Bodleian Library Broadside Ballads.

== The lyrics ==
"Broom Buzzems" refers to brooms (besoms). For a translation of other words, see Geordie dialect words.

Part 1 – the main (original) verses:

If ye want a buzzem
For to sweep yor hoose
Come to me, ma honey
Ye may hae yor choose.

Chorus:
Buy broom buzzems,
Buy them when they're new
Fine heather bred uns
Better never grew.

Buzzems for a penny
Rangers for a plack
If ye winnot buy
I'll tie them on my back.

Buy broom buzzems,

If aa had a horse
Ad wad hev a cairt;
If aa had a wife
She wad tyek me pairt.

Buy broom buzzems,

Had aa but a wife
Aa care not what she be-
If she's but a woman
That's enyuf for me

Buy broom buzzems,

If she liked a droppie,
Her and I'd agree;
If she didn't like it,
There's the mair for me.

Buy broom buzzems,

Part 2 – to the original, these are some of the new wimple verses that Blind Willie (the native minstrel of Newcastle) had added:

Up the Butcher Bank,
And down Byker Chare;
There you'll see the lasses
Selling brown ware.

Buy broom buzzems, etc.

Alang the Quayside,
Stop at Russell's Entry;
There you'll see the beer drawer,
She is standing sentry.

Buy broom buzzems, etc.

If you want an oyster,
For to taste your mouth,
Call at Handy Walker's—
He's a bonny youth.

Buy broom buzzems, etc.

Call at Mr. Loggie's,
He does sell good wine;
There you'll see the beer drawer,
She is very fine.

Buy broom buzzems, etc.

If you want an orange
Ripe and full of juice,
Gan to Hannah Black's;
There you'll get your choose.
Buy broom buzzems, etc.

Call at Mr. Turner's,
At the Queen's Head;
He'll not set you away
Without a piece of bread.

Buy broom buzzems, etc.

Down the river side
As far as Dent's Hole;
There you'll see the cuckolds
Working at the coal.

Buy broom buzzems, etc.

== Recordings ==
- Richard Lewis CBE (10 May 1914 – 13 November 1990) was a Welsh tenor
- YouTube recording by Richard Lewis
- YouTube recording by Northumbrian Smallpipes (in dialect)
- YouTube recording by Ray Beasley
