= Shields Song Book =

Book of songs written by people in South Shields

The Shields Song Book is a book of songs written by people of South Shields and published by C. W. Barnes in 1826.

== Brief details ==
The book had the title "The Shields Song Book, being a Collection of comic and sentimental songs never before published, Written by Gentlemen of the neighbourhood. South Shields, printed by C. W. Barnes, Thrift Street, 1826".

It was printed in 1826, and a copy was available from the Public Library at South Shields for many years.

== The collection ==
This “Shields song book” is mainly in dialect and contains the following :-

- Page 6 - “The Devil” (or “The Nanny Goat”) to the tune of “Weel bred Cappy”
- Page 7 - “Song” to the tune of “A herring in salt”
- Page 8 - “The Skipper’s Mistake” to the tune of "The Chapter of Accidents"
- Page 10 - The Pitman's description of La Perouse, performed for many successive nights at the South Shields Theatre” - to the tune of Betsy Baker
- Page 12 - “Song” to the tune of “The Rosebud of summer”
- Page 12 - “A Parody on Auld Lang Syne” to the tune of “Auld Lang Syne”
- Page 13 - “Canny Shields” to the tune of “Honey Moon”
- Page 14 - “Shields Races” to the tune of “The de’il cam fiddling through the Town”
- Page 16 - “The Cliffs of Virginia” to the tune of "Drops of Brandy"
- Page 18 - “Up and war them A’, Willy”
- Page 19 - Unknown contents of page
- Page 20 - “The Life boat” to the tune of “Drawing a long bow or, how to tell a story”
- Page 21 - “The Irishman” to the tune of “Wonderful Lunnin”
- Pages 22–24 - “The Westoe Darling” to the tune of “Such a beauty I do grow”

Three of these songs, “The Devil” (or “The Nanny Goat”), “The Cliffs of Virginia” and “The Skipper’s Mistake” appear in “Allan’s Illustrated Edition of Tyneside songs and readings with lives, portraits and autographs of the writers, and notes on the songs. Revised Edition”.
