= William Henderson Dawson =

William Henderson Dawson was a British Tyneside poet, songwriter, author and bookbinder who lived in Newcastle upon Tyne. His song "The Stephenson’s Monument" was written in 1862 for the inauguration of the monument. He contributed to the collection known as Allan’s Illustrated Edition of Tyneside Songs and Readings (1862), as well as a book on the poets of Newcastle. He wrote Walks round Old Newcastle.

== Life ==
William Henderson Dawson was born in Newcastle upon Tyne. He became a bookbinder, working at St. Nicholas' Churchyard in the workshop of Thomas Bewick, a wood engraver.

Dawson was deeply interested in the area, and learned about the songs, folklore and the people. He used this in his writings and collaborations. He assisted in the first edition of Allan's collection of Tyneside songs, writing many notes on the history of the songs. It was published in 1862.

He wrote the book, Walks round Old Newcastle, filled with anecdotes and local references to folklore and songs. He also contributed to The Local Poets of Newcastle, providing many biographical articles, some in prose and others in rhyme and song.

Dawson wrote regularly for local newspapers. His contributions to the local press included a regular letter for the Newcastle Guardian. After the death of J P Robson, Dawson succeeded him in writing his letter, "The Retoirt Keelman," for the Advertiser.

William Henderson Dawson died 25 January 1879, age 52 and was buried in St. John's Cemetery, Elswick.

== Songs ==
He wrote many songs, mostly in the Geordie dialect. These included :

- "The Stephenson Monument" – on its inauguration on 2 October 1862
- "The Pitman's Visit to Stephenson's Monument" to the tune of "Tallygrip"
- "The Pitman’s Tickor An’ the Wag-at-the-Wa’" to the tune of "Barbara Allen"*

== Books ==
- contributor to Allan’s Illustrated Edition of Tyneside Songs and Readings (1862)
- Walks round Old Newcastle
- contributor to The Local Poets of Newcastle

== See also ==
Geordie dialect words
