= John Kelday Smith =

John Kelday Smith (c. 1834–1889) was a Scottish-born Geordie bellhanger and songwriter in the middle and late 19th century, many of the songs being in the local Geordie dialect. His most famous song is possibly "Since aw hev been away".

== Life ==
John Kelday Smith was born c1834 in Stromness, Orkney, Scotland, the second son of three of Thomas Smith (b 1804) a sailor, and Sibella Kelday (1802 - 1872), a laundress, but moved to Newcastle as an infant.

According to successive National Censuses, by the age of 17, he was a sailor, presumably on his father's ship, as Thomas was by this time a ship's master. However, he established a business as a whitesmith / bellhanger and by 1871 was a master bellhanger, employing two apprentices in Shield St, Shieldfield, Newcastle. Bellhangers were employed in ship construction as well as bell-hanging and mechanical wiring for bells.

In 1880, he married Mary Thompson (1857 - 1922) of Penrith, Cumberland. They had seven children between 1879 and 1888, of whom five survived infancy. His son, nephew and grandson all bore his name.

John Kelday Smith died on 12 June 1889 at his home Temperance Row, Shieldfield, Newcastle, age 54.

He wrote many local songs and articles that appeared in "Charter's comic publication", "Ward's Almanack" and the "Weekly Chronicle". He also won a prize for a song about the Gateshead Working Men's Club and for an essay on working men's clubs in general.

A few details of Smith appeared in "The Monthly Chronicle of North Country Lore and Legend"—printed and published for proprietors of the "Newcastle Weekly Chronicle" by Walter Scott, Newcastle upon Tyne—at about the time of his death.

== Works ==
These include :-

- Give ower noo – a typical Music Hall comedy song of the time.
- The Tyneside Exibishin, 1887 – A song about Queen Victoria's Golden Jubilee and a public exhibition that was held in Exhibition park from 11 May until 28 October 1887. The song was first printed in "The Newcastle Weekly Courant" on 30 September 1887.
- Whereivvor Hae They Gyen – to the tune of Tune—"Perhaps she's on the Railway" - A song about the immense changes in the century.
- Since aw hev been away - Another song about the changes to Newcastle which had taken place between 1824 and 1860 when a large proportion of the old city centre was redeveloped. This involved not only the removal of slum areas but also many well-known landmarks. The song first appeared in the Chapbook “Keelmin's comic annewal, for 1871, gi'es ye the best bits o' wit an' wisdim, be the clivvorest cheps aboot Tyneside; awl my'ed oot o' thor awn heeds and 'lustrayted wi' lots iv' curius an' clivvor comic cuts”.

== See also ==
Geordie dialect words
