= Edward Elliott (songwriter) =

British singer (c. 1800–1867)

Edward Elliott (c. 1800–1867) was born in Northumberland. He was a writer of popular humorous songs, and, in turn, an alcoholic, a reformed alcoholic, and an ardent temperance worker. His most famous song is "Whitley Camp".

== Life ==
Edward Elliott was born circa 1800, possibly in Earsdon, Northumberland. He became an alcoholic at an early age, fought the addiction, and defeated it to become an advocate of temperance movement. He lectured in the subject of alcoholism, having plenty of material from his own experience. He told autobiographical stories of his problems on the stage and told them with great effect. In one story, told with pathos and humour, he described a drunkard's home, and showed the poverty by describing the mice sitting in the pantry with tears in their eyes.

He never attempted to refine his broad Geordie dialect as he knew this could detract from humour, and consequently, the message. And many time his act broke down in "irrepressible laughter".

According to one of Haliiwell’s article in the Weekly Chronicle, a Mr. Taylor, the eminent engineer, once asked Elliott why he became a teetotaller. Elliott answered in his broad dialect, "Aa've h'ard it said there's a certain quantity of drink brewed for ivory man, and a'am sure aa've drunk ma share lang since"

He was also known as E.E. and used the pseudonym on two songs in the 1862 publication of his works.

Edward Elliott died 29 April 1867, age 67 and was buried in Earsdon Churchyard.

== Works ==
These include:

- The Sheep-Killin Dog – October 1862
- Whitley Camp – the story of the Felling Artillery Corps camping on Whitley Sands - September 1862.

== See also ==
Geordie dialect words
