= Edward Chicken =

English poet

Edward Chicken (1698–1746) was a Northumberland born teacher, poet and Parish Clerk. One of his poems was "The Collier’s Wedding". He was one of the earliest of the Geordie poets and songsters.

== Life ==
Edward Chicken was born in 1698 in Newcastle upon Tyne.
Not much is known of his life except a few snippets, mainly from details from a Mr W Cail's publication of 1829.
He was the Parish clerk at St. John's Church, and lived at (or near) The White Cross, Newgate Street. Newcastle upon Tyne.
By profession he was a teacher.

On 6 February 1719, Chicken married Ann Jordan of Newcastle (d. 1768). Together they had four children: Edward (b. 1721), Catherine (1723-1759), George (b. 1726) who died in infancy, and Eleanor (1728-1810).
Edward Chicken died on 2 January 1746 in Newcastle, and was buried at St. John's Churchyard where a tombstone was erected in his name.

== Works ==
He was the author of "The Collier's Wedding" written in 1729 and gives a somewhat idyllic view of life in Benwell and Elswick, which were two of the many local pits, at the start of the 18th century.
The original manuscript has long since disappeared but a copy, with the colophon: "the foregoing Copied by me this 16 Dec. 1819 from a Manuscript in the Author's hand writing belonging to Mr [blank] of Edinbro'"; the "me" in the statement being a "Mr W Cail of Newcastle".
An edition was published by Mr Cail c 1829, this version being in plain English, and not in dialect.
This original transcript was sold by auction in November 2011 for over £1,000.

NOTE – A William Cail was practicing as a solicitor in Newcastle c1829, but it is not known if this was the same person.

== See also ==
- Geordie dialect words
- List of 18th-century British working-class writers
