= Michael Benson (poet) =

English poet

Michael Benson (1795 – 1871) was a 19th-century English printer and poet. He worked as a printer from 1838 until his death.

== Life ==
Very little is known of him except for a comment in Allan’s Illustrated Edition of Tyneside Songs and Readings, with lives, portraits and autographs of the writers, and notes on the songs, revised edition Benson was a member of the "Stars of Friendship" fraternal organization. According to the book, he was known as "probably the oldest master printer in the town". He is remembered for his address, which he entitled "The Birth of Friendship's Star" and which he read at the 1828 Christmas Day anniversary dinner. The reading was apparently generally accepted as the best address of the evening, and this included one given by a colleague and other Gateshead born poet, John Selkirk, writer of "Swalwell Hopping" and songs about Bob Cranky.

== See also ==
- Geordie dialect words
