= Jemmy Joneson's Whurry =

Song composed by Thomas Thompson

Song
- Language: English (Geordie)
- Written: c. 1815
- Published: 1823
- Genre: Folk song
- Songwriter: Thomas Thompson

Jemmy Joneson's Whurry is a traditional Geordie folk song in Geordie dialect written circa 1815, by Thomas Thompson, in a style deriving from music hall.

This song appears to be the last one Thomas Thompson wrote, and the earliest record of its publication is 1823, seven years after his death.

== Lyrics ==
The song refers to the time before steam power on the water, a time when travel across and along the River Tyne was by wherry and similar which required muscle power. At the time Jimmy Joneson was well known, as was his boat, by passengers and by people generally on the Tyne. Shortly after the song was written, on Ascension Day, 19 May 1814, the first steamer started working on the Tyne, operated by the "Tyne Steam Packet Co."

The publisher made an error on the first edition which led to this being copied onto many other publication, even after the error was brought to their attention and corrected

The song appears in many publications including "Collection of songs chiefly in the Newcastle dialect – And illustrative of the Language and Manners of the Common People on the Banks of the Tyne and neighbourhood – By T. Thompson, J. Shields, W. Mitford, H. Robson, and others. Newcastle upon Tyne: Printed by John Marshall, In the Old Flesh Market. 1827.”
In several other publications one or more of the (usually) later verses have been omitted.

JEMMY JONESON'S WHURRY

<poem> Whei cowers biv the chimlay reek.
Begox ! its all a horney;
For thro' the world aw thowt to keek,
Yen day when aw waa corney:
Sae, wiv some varry canny chiels,
All on the hop and murry,
Aw thowt aw'd myek a voyge to Shiels,
Iv Jemmy Joneson's whurry.

Ye niver see'd the church sae scrudg'd,
As we were there thegither;
An' gentle, simple, throughways rudg'd,
Like burdies of a feather:
Blind Willie, a' wor joys to croon,
Struck up a hey down derry,
An' crouse we left wor canny toon,
Iv Jemmy Joneson's whurry.

As we push'd off, loak a' the Key
To me seem'd shuggy-shooin:
An' tho' aw'd niver been at sea,
Aw stuid her like a new-on'.
An' when the Malls began their reels,
Aw kick'd maw heels reet murry;
For faix ! aw lik'd the voyge to Shiels,
Iv Jemmy Joneson's whurry.

Quick went wor heels, quick went the oars,
An' where me eyes wur cassin,
It seem'd as if the bizzy shore
Cheer'd canny Tyne i' passin.
What ! hez Newcassel now nae end?
Thinks aw, it's wond'rous, vurry;
Aw thowt aw'd like me life to spend
Iv Jemmy Joneson's whurry.

Tyne-side seem'd clad wiv bonny ha's,
An' furnaces sae dunny;
Wey this mun be what Bible ca's
"The land ov milk and honey!"
If a' thor things belang'd tiv me,
Aw'd myek the poor reet murry,
An' gar each heart to sing wiv glee,
Iv Jemmy Joneson's whurry.

Then on we went, as nice as ourse,
Till nenst au'd Lizzy Moody's;
A whirlwind cam an' myed a' souse,
Like heaps o' babby boodies.
The heykin myed me vurry wauf,
Me heed turn'd duzzy, vurry;
Me leuks, aw'm shure, wad spyen'd a cauf,
Iv Jemmy Joneson's whurry.

For hyem an' bairns, an' maw wife Nan,
Aw yool'd oot like a lubbart;
An' when aw thowt we a' shud gan
To Davy Jones's cubbart,
The wind bee-baw'd, aw whish'd me squeels,
An' yence mair aw was murry,
For seun we gat a seet o' Shiels,
Frev Jemmy Joneson's whurry.

Wor Geordies now we thrimmel'd oot,
An' tread a' Shiels sae dinny;
Maw faix ! it seems a canny sprout,
As big maist as its minny,
Aw smack'd thir yell, aw climb'd thir bree,
The seet was wond'rous, vurry;
Aw lowp'd sic gallant ships to see,
Biv Jemmy Joneson's Whurry.

To Tynemouth then aw thowt aw'd trudge,
To see the folks a' dackin;
Loak ! men an' wives togither pludg'd,
While hundreds stood by iaikin'
Amang the rest aw cowp'd me creels,
Eh, gox ! 'twas funny, vurry;
An' so aw end me voyge to Shiels,
Iv Jemmy Joneson's whurry. </poem?

=== People and places mentioned ===
- Blind Willie was William Purvis the singer and performer
- Davy Jones's cubbart is nationally better known as Davy Jones' Locker
- Jemmy Joneson's whurry was the ferry and its owner/operator which plied the Tyne before the days of steam
- Newcassel is Newcastle upon Tyne
- Shiels is Shields. It could be North Shields or South Shields, but it is assumed to be North Shields, which is on the North bank of the River Tyne and it is from the finishing point that the party "trudged" to Tynemouth
- Tyne is the River Tyne
- Tyne Steam Packet Co. was the company which operated the first steam ferry on the Tyne
- Tynemouth is the town, as its name suggests, at the mouth of the River Tyne. T6he town also continues "round the headland" as a resort town.
- A whurry (or in English a "wherry", is a type of boat traditionally used for carrying cargo or passengers on rivers, in the case of the Tyne Wherry, the River Tyne, which was operated by oars and physical manpower.

== Comments on variations to the above version ==
NOTE –
In the early 19th century, as today, there were cheap books and magazines.
Many of these "chapbooks" were on poor quality paper to a poor standard and with poor quality print. The works were copied with no thoughts of copyright, and the work required very little proof-reading, and what was done was not required to a high standard.
Between the many versions published there are differences, some very minor, proof reading spelling errors, variations mainly in the spelling of the words, and these sometimes variations within the same edition.

Generally

a', aa and aw
aa'd and awd
an' and and
aw'd and I'd
birdies and burdies
cavers and cowers
chimlay and chimley
hes and hez
kee and key
make and myek
me and my
oot and out
ourse and owse
semple and simple
Sheels and Shiels
together and togither
toon and town
voyge and voyage
waa and was
were and wur
whei and who

Specific differences

Verse 1 Line 3 thowt becomes wisht
Verse 5 Line 5 ends with "I" to rhyme with ----
Verse 5 Line 7 changed to "An' cheer the folks i' gannin by"
Verse 9 Line 2 ends with "duckin" to rhyme with ---
Verse 9 Line 4 is changed to "While hundreds stuid by leukin"

== Recordings ==
To follow

== See also ==
- Geordie dialect words
