= John Craggs (songwriter) =

English songwriter

John Craggs (1849 – 1915) was a poet from North Sunderland who wrote several poems and songs including "The Lass that sell’d grozers upon the aad bridge", an example of Geordie dialect.

== Life ==
John Craggs was born in 1849 in North Sunderland, Northumberland, which is now a suburb of Seahouses. He moved to Gateshead in his teenage years and was employed for several years as a clerk on the Tyne until in 1877, he migrated to the London where he became a member of the Detective division of the Metropolitan police force. During his time in the Met Police, he was involved with hunting down and capturing fraudster Jabez Balfour in Argentina.

He fathered 15 children over two marriages, including well known magician Philip Craggs who performed under the Pseudonym Paul Clive, Ventriloquist Douglas Craggs and adventurer and orchid cultivator, Hugh Craggs.

He was a regular contributor to the local newspapers and used as a Pseudonym, the nom-de-plume of "Mrkg. Fudjjv", which is a cryptogram of his name. In 1874 he was awarded Chater's gold medal for his sentimental song, "The Old Cot on the Tyne."

He died on the 4th January 1915 at the London Hospital in Whitechapel following complications with a leg amputation due to contracting type 2 diabetes.

== Works ==
Works include, among others:

- M.P. for Jarra (The)
- Letter from Hannah
- Old cot (The) – which won the 1874 Chater's gold medal
- Lass that sell’d grozers upon the aad bridge (The)
- Cuddy's egg - Comic song about hatching a 'cheese'
- Ninety-nine song about old age, similar to Sair Fyel'd, Hinny

== See also ==
- Geordie dialect words
