= The Pitman's Pay =

Poem by Thomas Wilson

"The Pitman’s Pay"

Song by Thomas Watson
- Language: English (Geordie)
- Published: 1843
- Lyricist(s): Thomas Wilson

"The Pitman’s Pay" is a poem written by Thomas Wilson. It was first printed in a Newcastle magazine called Mitchell's Magazine in 1826. Further sections were printed in 1828 and 1830. It was later republished by George Watson, a Gateshead printer.

A further book, A collection of selected songs by Gateshead composer Thomas Wilson, which included "The Pitman’s Pay", was reprinted 14 years after his death in 1872.

Much of the work is written in Geordie dialect. For translations, see Geordie dialect words.
