= James Horsley (songwriter) =

British songwriter

James Horsley (1828–1891) was an Alnwick born songwriter, editor, and general handyman. In addition to his songs, he wrote many pieces of poetry about Jesmond. The most well-known of the songs may well have been "'She's sumboddy's bairn".

== Early life ==
James Horsley was born in 1828 at Snipe House, Alnwick, Northumberland. His father, also James (and living with his second wife), was a farmer. Almost immediately after the birth, the family moved to Newcastle upon Tyne; there, they attempted to run a small business in Percy Street. The business was unsuccessful and within a few years both parents died, leaving James orphaned at young age, with little education, and few means, or friends. James managed to survive these difficulties, but it must have been a very hard life.

He worked in many trades including as a cabin boy on a coaster or collier plying between Tyneside and London, a grocer's errand boy, a message boy and general servant to Doctor Shiell of Regent Terrace, Newcastle and had various other jobs. When he was around the 18 to 20 years mark, he moved again to work at several places as a stable boy.

== Later life ==
Circa 1850 he moved to the Advertiser and (Ward's) Directory with Robert Ward, whose printing works were on the first floor of a building in St Nicholas' churchyard in Newcastle. He was later transferred/promoted into a job as canvasser and collector for the Advertiser, but shortly afterwards was taken ill; an illness which lasted for some time. In early 1859 he joined Mr Andrew Reid of Pilgrim Street, Newcastle (to work on the "Reid's Railway Guide" of which he would eventually become manager and editor), and where he stayed until his death. Initially he was employed as a canvasser and collector, but in 1860 he suffered another long illness. He eventually returned to work after many months, and although not of perfect health (he was very concerned that his illness would re-occur) was always cheerful and well loved by his colleagues and associates.

His mottoes were "Be careful of the company you keep, and be thoroughly honest and truthful in all your dealings" and "Live within your means, no matter what your salary may be, and never get into debt." His work involved frequent trips to the Lake District which led to an increased output of poetry, but Jesmond remained his favourite spot, and he could be found there most Saturday afternoons.

== Death ==
James Horsley died on Sunday, 8 March 1891, at the age of 62 years at his home at 42 Chester Street, Newcastle. He was buried in St. Andrew's Cemetery.

Snow fell heavily at the time of his death, and at the funeral lay so thick that a way had to be cut to the grave. His widow died six months later (September 1891) and was buried in the same plot in St. Andrew's Cemetery.

== Legacy ==
His first song, “Geordy's Dream or, the Sun and the Muen” was written when he was about 21 but his next song wasn't published until he was almost 50. Most of his songs, and many of his poems are written in broad Geordie dialect. His biography, written by a friend, a Mr Hastings, (and it is him that we should thank for the details on the writer), is entitled "Lays of Jesmond and Tyneside Songs and Poems – By the late James Horsley".

It was published and printed by Andrew Reid, sons and Co. 50, Grey Street, Newcastle and Allan, Bookseller, Blackett Street, Newcastle in 1891.

He occasionally contributed to the columns of the North of England Advertiser, on several occasions wrote the Retiort Keelman's letter, (continuing, along with other poets, writing the "dialect letter" using the pseudonym started by Joseph Philip Robson) and his poems appeared in the Journal and Courant.

His songs appeared in “Allan's Tyneside songs 1891” and also in "The North of England Almanac for 1882".

== Works ==
His numerous works include :-

- Appeal To Liberals (An)
- Ash Tree
- Aw Wish The Gud Times Wad Cum – to the tune of "The Low-Backed Car"
- Bairns An' The Schule Bord (The)
- Barges in 1881 (The)
- Bettor Times That's Cummin! (The) – to the tune of "Because he was a Bonny Lad”
- Bicycle Bell (The) – was written for and appeared in the Christmas 1882 edition of The Cyclist and set to music by Mr Thomas Bell, of Newcastle
- Birth of the Year (The)
- Blaydon Burn
- Bridge (The)
- British Empire (The)
- Bywell
- Bywell Castle – To John Hall, Esq.
- Cemetery (The) : Her Grave
- Centenary Hymn (A)
- Chapel Ruin at Jesmond (The)
- Chinese Sailors in Newcassel (The) – to the tune of "My Darling Molly" – A naval vessel was built at Armstrong's in 1881 for the Chinese Government and hundreds of Chinese sailors came to Newcastle to crew her. The song describes them as seen in the streets.
- John Chinaman's Reply (In Pigeon English) – to the tune of "Chinese Sailors in Newcassel"
- Christian's Dawn (The) – suggested by J. R. Waller's "The Coming Dawn
- Christmas, The Queen of the Year
- Comet (The)
- Corporrayshun Steybles (The)
- Corporrayshun Thundor – Dedicated To The Scavenging' Department
- Craw's Nest (The) – publisher c1848 – about the removal of a particular tree, known as the "Crow's nest" during the building of the Durham College of Science
- Croft House, Wokingham – Dedicated To Alexander Wood Esq.
- Cordele Glen
- Cuddies and the Horses (The)
- Dead Ash Tree (The)
- Death of Lord Beaconsfield (The) – April i9th, 1881.
- Death of the Ash Tree (The) – (Known as the King of Jesmond.)
- Demolition of the Carliol Tower (The) – The picturesque tower, a relic of Newcastle's time as a border town, was taken down in April 1880. It was around this area that "The battle of the Public Library Buildings" took place
- Dove of Peace ! (The)
- D'ye Knaa John Storey?
- Eighty-Three
- Electors Prepare
- Emigrant's Sigh (The)
- End (The)
- England's Mission
- England's Trial
- English Woman And Belgian Rouse
- Fair-Haired Maid (The)
- Farewell Old Year !
- Fellin' Ghost (The)
- Festival on the Toon Moor (The) – to the tune of "Weel Deun Cappy”
- Flower Service Hymn
- Free Trade or Fair
- Friday Fields, Jesmond
- Geordie's jubilee Ode – (published c 1887)- was a song written for the Golden Jubilee of Queen Victoria, very popular for a brief time, but would have had a short lifespan
- Geordie's Last Aboot The Prince
- Geordy's Dream or, the Sun and the Muen – his first song written at the age of c21 years
- Gladstone Craze (The)
- Golden Wedding Day of the Rev. Dr. J. Collingwood Bruce And Mrs. Bruce (The) – 20 June 1883.
- Grand Old English Fair (The) – This was held in the Town Hall, Newcastle, October 1883, in aid of the Northumberland Village Homes, Whitley-by-the-Sea, and raised £4,000
- Grove (The)
- Guid Times in Store (The) – to the tune of "The Low-Backed Car”
- Halliday-Time
- "Heathen Chinee" In Newcassel (The)
- Holy Well, Jesmond Grove (The)
- Iddesleigh.- death of – 15 January 1887
- Jesmond – This area of Newcastle which became his favourite theme.
- Jesmond Dene
- Jesmond Dene in Autumn
- Jesmond Grove in Winter
- John Storey
- Kindness Everywhere – to the tune of "March of the Men of Harlech”
- King of Jesmond (The) – the nickname for an old Ash Tree
- Laburnums of Jesmond (The)
- Letter Fre Geordie Aboot The Prince's Visit (A)
- Lines of Sympathy – On the Death of Andrew Octavius Reid, Aged 10 Years – 26 May 1884
- Loneliness
- Longfellow
- Love's Look
- May-Day Horse Show (The)
- Meadow (The)
- Meg's Mystery
- Merry Christmas
- Mickey An' The M'yun
- Miller of Allerston (The)- Inscribed To Mr. William Ward
- My Knight No More I'll See
- New City Craze (The) – to the tune of " Canny Newcassel”
- New Start for Eighty-One (A)
- Newcassel and the Snaw-storm – (written and published c 1878) – to the tune of "Weel Deun Cappy" – A popular song but of short lived popularity after the snow was gone. This song was signed J.H.
- Newcassel Dort
- Newcassel Feuls, Past An' Prissint !
- Newcassel's Bran New Bishop – to the tune of "The Fiery Clock Fyece" – The Rev. Ernest Wilberforce, Canon of Winchester, was the first Bishop of Newcastle upon Tyne
- Noble Domain (A)
- O! For A Job!
- O! Zulu – A Lament: — Isandula— Rorke's Drift — The Tugela
- Oh, Come To The Sea
- Oh, Dinnet Strike
- Oh, Have You Got A Match
- Oh, My ! What Changes
- On Newcastle Town Moor, 28 and 29 June 1882
- On The Death Of Frank E. Bell – Late Manager of the Theatre Royal, Newcastle – 7 February 1882
- On The Death Of John Clayton – Newcastle, 14 July 1890.
- On The Death Of Miss H. Hastings – 7 October 1882
- On The Death Of R. P. Philipson – Newcastle, 15 December 1879
- On The Eve Of The Opening Of The Public Library
- On The Silver Wedding Of Mr. And Mrs. James Hall – Tynemouth, Northumberland – February l0th, 1888.
- One-Horse Car (The)
- Our Ancient Walls
- Owt Fresh, Hinney ?
- Parting Year (The)
- Pilgrimage to Jesmond (A)
- Plea for the Aged Female Society (A)
- Poet's Friend (The)
- Poor's House (The) – Newcastle, 14 October 1880.
- Primrose Day.— 1884 – This was 19 April 1884.
- Primrose Day.— 1885 – This was 19 April 1885.
- Queen Victoria's Jubilee
- Raft on the Ocean (The)
- Reet And The Wrang (The) – to the tune of “Paddle your own Canoe”
- Rippling Burn (The)
- Sailor's Child (The)
- Saltwell Park
- Scotch Hares – to the tune of “The King of the Cannibal Islands”
- She's sumboddy's bairn – (Written and published c1886) – A song about young women on the street. This offering is very different from his usual style
- Spring's Evening Hour
- St. James's, Newcastle – The building referred to was pulled down in April 1880, to make way for the Natural History Society's Museum.
- St. Nicholas's Chimes
- St. Valentine's Day
- Storm Warnin' (The)
- Sunderland Calamity (The) – 186 children were crushed to death at an event In the Victoria Hall on Saturday 16 June 1883.
- Sweet Jesmond Dene
- Sweet Memories
- Tea Kettle's Song (The)
- Temperance Festival – (written and published c 1882) – The North of England Temperance League was founded in 1858 and in 1882, after the town race meetings were moved from the Town Moor, an annual Temperance Festival was inaugurated to serve as a rival-attraction to Race Week. This festival gradually became the “Hopping”. Another song signed just J.H.
- That Blessed Corporation – to the tune of “Obadiah”
- That Field of Corn
- That Wretched Schule Bord
- Thor Taxin' Wor Drink
- Time and Eternity
- 'Tis Spring Today
- To the Angel of Death c1886.
- To The Wansbeck
- Toasting Stanza
- Tom's White Craw
- Tower's Appeal (The)
- Tower's Warning (The)
- Tram! Tram! Tram!
- Triumphs Of Peace (The)
- Try An’ Myek The World Better – to the tune of “Canny Newcassel”
- Twenty-fower o'clock – to the tune of “Polly's Nick Stick” – A song about the, in those days rare, but now common, twenty-four-hour clock
- Tyek Maw Advice, Maw Canny Lad
- Tyne (The) 25
- Tynemouth— A Lament – to the tune of “The Meeting of the Waters”
- Way Te Be Happy (The) – to the tune of “Canny Newcassel”
- Welcome the Royal Pair
- Welcome, Prince of Wales
- Won Mile frae Newcassel
- Wonderful Cure (The)
- Wonderful Things O' Thor Modern Days (The) – to the tune of “Weel Dune Cappy”
- Wor Aad Fether Tyne – A Soliloquy
- Wor Civilization ! – to the tune of “Canny Newcassel”
- Wor Free Libory
- Wor Grand New Rivver Station
- Wor Toon Clerk's Deed

== See also ==
Geordie dialect words
