= Charles Purvis =

British songwriter

Charles Purvis, a 19th-century songwriter, was born near Otterburn, Northumberland, and moved to Newcastle upon Tyne
His employment included schoolmaster, followed by a clerk to a merchant on the Quayside. He later set up as a general merchant which failed after a short period of time "leaving a few empty barrels to pay his creditors with." In his writings he used the pen name "C. P."

The above is virtually all that is known about Charles Purvis. It was discovered in a small note in the documentation collected by John Bell and included in Allan’s Illustrated Edition of Tyneside songs and readings of 1891.
C.P. is known for his song "Bards of the Tyne"

== See also ==
Geordie dialect words
