= Thomas Wilson (poet) =

Thomas Wilson, poet and partner in Losh, Wilson and Bell

Thomas Wilson (1773 – 9 May 1858) was a Tyneside poet, from Low Fell in County Durham. His most famous work, written in the Geordie dialect, is The Pitman's Pay, originally published between 1826 and 1830.

== Early life ==
Wilson, was born on 14 November 1773 at Low Fell, now a suburb of Gateshead into a very poor family. Like many from the North East, he began his working life down the mines at one of the many local pits, starting as a trapper-boy at around the age of around 8 or 9 years old. He had the determination to better himself, and wanted to improve his life and so studied, educating himself to a high standard, before moving on to become a schoolmaster at an early age.

== Later life ==
After a short stay in this job, he moved to a clerkship on Newcastle's Quayside.

In 1803, Wilson followed this with a move to join a Tyneside engineering company run by Mr John Losh. He became a partner in the company in 1807 and the partnership changed its name to Losh, Wilson and Bell, manufacturer of alkali and iron.

In 1826 the first part of his most famous song The Pitman's Pay was published in a Newcastle magazine. Subsequent parts appeared over the next two years. Other well-known works include The Weshin’ Day; his last poem was The Market Day.

Wilson never lost his love of the area, or its people. He moved to Fell House, close to his birthplace, and spent the remainder of his long life there. He went on to write many other songs and pieces of prose, usually in the Geordie dialect; these were mostly published by George Routledge & Sons.

Wilson died on 9 May 1858 at the age of 85 and is buried in St Johns Church Sheriff Hill Gateshead. A philanthropist, he was responsible for the erection of a building in Low Fell in 1841 which provided reading rooms, a schoolroom and a lecture theatre for the working classes. A social club in the Low Fell area is named after him.

== Works ==
- The Pitman's Pay
- Stanzas on the Intended New Line of Road from Potticar-Lane to Leyburn-Hole
- The Oiling of Dicky's Wig
- The Opening of the Newcastle and Carlisle Railway
- The Captain's and the Quayside
- A Keelman's Tribute to a Friend
- A Dirge on the Death of Coaly
- Joyce's Patent Stove
- The Humble Petition of the Sand Banks in the Tyne
- The Alderman's Lament
- The Pea-jacket
- The Movement
- A Glance at Polly Technic
- Lines on John Smith
- The Author's Arm-chair
- The Author's Favourite Dog, Pincher
- On Parting with a Favourite Mare
- A Character
- Charley the Newsmonger
- On Seeing a Mouse Run Across the Road in January
- Petition of an Apple-tree
- Answer to the Foregoing
- The Tippling Dominie
- The Washing-day (or The Weshin' Day)
- Woman
- David Profit
- Carter's Well
- The Industrious and Peaceable Pair
- The Village-howdy
- The Happy Home

== Notes ==
Gateshead Borough Council plans to erect a Blue plaque to commemorate "Thomas Wilson (1774-1858) Poet, Teacher and Business Man".

There is also a CIU Working Men's Club in the Low Fell area named after him.
