= Thomas Thompson (songwriter) =

Thomas Thompson (1773–1816) was a Tyneside poet, from Bishop Auckland area in County Durham. His last song was Jemmy Joneson's Whurry, first published in 1823, seven years after his death.

== Early life ==
Thomas Thompson was born in 1773 in (or close to) Bishop Auckland, County Durham, the son of an officer who was already suffering from (what would turn out to be, a terminal) fever at the time of Thomas’ birth. He finished his education at Durham and then moved to Newcastle upon Tyne c 1790. Already a well-known and respected business man, and with the threat of war with, and invasion from, France, Thomas joined up in the Newcastle Light Horse as acting quartermaster, with a quick promotion following to rank of captain.

== Later life ==
Thomas Thompson was married and had (at least one) a son Robert born c1812. He built and lived in Cotfield House, Windmill Hills, Gateshead. Thompson became a successful merchant trader with offices in the Broad Chare, Skinners Burn, Forth Banks. In 1796 he had connections with a woollen draper, Mr D Bell, and in 1801 was trading as a general merchant trading as Armstrong, Thompson & Co. He was also known for his voluntary work in the area. He died on 9 January 1816 aged 42 at his home from exertion, cold and fatigue & similar, after trying to protect his property after an instance of the River Tyne flooding. He was buried at Old St Johns.

== Works ==
His songs include:

- The New Keel Row
- Canny Newcastle
- Newcastle election song 1812
- Jemmy Joneson’s Whurry

== See also ==
- Geordie dialect words
- William Purvis (Blind Willie)
