= William Purvis (Blind Willie) =

British concert hall song writer and performer

William Purvis, probably better known as "Blind Willie" (1752 – 20 July 1832), was a Tyneside concert hall song writer and performer in England at the end of the 18th and start of the 19th century. His most famous song is "Broom Buzzems". He became known later as the "ancient laureate of the Tyne" and was remembered in the songs of Robert Gilchrist (1797–1844) and Thomas Thompson (1773–1816).

== Early life ==
William Purvis was the son of John Purvis, a waterman, and Margaret Purvis (who died in All Saints Poorhouse aged over 100). William was born early in the year of 1752 in Newcastle, and baptised at All Saints' Church on 16 February 1752. He was either blind from birth, or very shortly after, although he often made comments from which the onlooker would think he could see. Very rarely did he perform in the street, preferring to perform in ale houses, in which he would depend on the charity of the public, but as he seemed to bring trade and the public appeared to like his ditties this seemed an amicable arrangement. He was apparently hatless in all weathers and to most of the locals and to his clientele he was just "Blind Willie".

== Later life ==
William Purvis was an inhabitant of the All Saints Poorhouse but wandered around much of the town, distinguishing every street, alley, house, or shop with astonishing exactness. Even when a tenancies changed, he soon discovered the name of the new tenant, and would, call it out the next time he passed. He was a great favourite of the local populace and few would pass him by in the street without recognition and a degree of sympathy. He died on 20 July 1832 at the age of 80.

== Works ==
His favourite appeared to be "Buy Broom Buzzems" or "Broom Besoms" which some said he composed, although others disputed this fact. However, he made it his own, and added and removed extra simple verses to suit himself (and his audience)

== Notes ==
Much of the information on Blind Willie comes from the book Northumbrian Minstrelsy. This book, edited by J. Collingwood Bruce and John Stokoe, is a collection of ballads, melodies and small-pipe tunes of Northumbria. It was first published by the Society of Antiquaries of Newcastle upon Tyne in 1882 and contains notes of the songs and tunes.

This book quotes:

This eccentric character never enjoyed the faculty of sight, and many still living remember the sonsy, contented, and sightless face of Willie as he trudged the streets without a covering on his head. Several attempts were made by presenting him with a hat to induce him to wear one; but after having borne the infliction for a day or two, it was thrown aside, and the 'Minstrel', as he was called, appeared again uncovered, preferring the exposure of his hoary but well-thatched pate to the pelting of the pitiless storm. Blind Willie was perfectly acquainted with all the streets, lanes, and chares of his native town, and made his way everywhere without a guide, only using a long stick. His happy, contented nature made him a universal favourite with all ranks of society; and he had his regular places of call, where he was always welcome and duly served. At the inns and public houses of the town Blind Willie's presence in the taproom was a sure attraction, and his voice and fiddle in harmony, singing some quaint local ditty, gave never failing delight to his appreciative audiences.

Other references appear in the Newcastle Monthly Chronicle and an edition of Volume 2 (pages 517 and 518) of 1888

This gives an interesting description of Blind Willie as:

He (Willie) had his regular houses of call, where he was always welcome, and duly served. Thus he used to drop in on his rounds at Messrs. Clapham & Gilpin's chemist's shop, first in Silver Street, and afterwards in Pilgrim Street, for the purpose of getting a dole of Spanish juice, which was never denied him. His invariable address was,

"Hinny, doctor, gie us a bit o' Spanish! " uttered in the confident tones of a simple, guileless boy; and "God blish the king – God blish the King; never shaed him – never sheed him; poor shoul – poor shoul!" was his regular form of thanksgiving.

There are mentions in two other articles in this same publication on Pages 80 and 517.

An article on page 353 and 354 of the Monthly Chronicle of 1889 entitled "View near the Close Gate 1826" mentioned "Blin'd Willie".

It states:

...had its "characters" in the days that are gone. Of these Blin'd Willie was one of the most notable. His name was William Purvis, and he was probably one of the best known characters that ever wandered through the streets of Newcastle.

Another edition describes his antics in more detail, Willy as he entered a public house:

With the instinct peculiar to blind people Willie made his way instantly to us.
We rose at once, and handed him a chair. Willie's dress was generally grey, and he wore buckles, like our keelmen of old.
He always went without a hat, and groped his way about wonderfully.
As soon as Willie got seated he said, "Bonny beer, bonny beer." We took the hint and at once ordered a pint of beer to be brought to him.
Willie went on "God blish the king—God blish the king; never sheed him-never sheed him; poor shoul- poor shoul!
"Willie we said after he had taken a good draught of the beer- Willie, we once heard you sing a little song.
Will you kindly repeat it?
"Shartinly, shartinly, ma chewel."
Billy puts down the fiddle and accompanies a sort of chorus by clapping his knees with both hands—For to make the haggish nishe they put in some brown spishe.
Tarum tickle, tan dum,
to the tune o' tan dum,
Tarum tickle, tan dum.
And to make the haggish fine
They put in a bottle of wine.
Tarum tickle, tan dum,
To the tune o' tan dum,
Tarum tickle, tarum tickle tan dum.

Ha, ha, ha, ha, ha, chuckles Billy when he had finished, poor shoul, poor shoul!

== See also ==
- Geordie dialect words
