= Thomas Allan (publisher) =

English song collector and publisher (1832–1894)

Thomas Allan (25 November 1832 – 8 April 1894) was an English song collector and music publisher from Newcastle upon Tyne who played a major part in the recording of the music of the day.

== Career ==
In 1858, he joined his brother Ralph's stationery business. Soon afterwards, he opened his own shop selling papers and books.

== The publication Tyneside Songs ==
In 1862, he published his first book, Tyneside Songs. The first edition was very small and covered mainly songs of Edward "Ned" Corvan and George "Geordie" Ridley.

Over the years he developed the book, adding to it, until eventually it became an extremely large volume with almost 600 pages (590?). The title was changed to Allan's Tyneside Songs, and the contents increased to cover not just the songs but details and histories of them, their writers and singers. As it developed, the theme changed from one of solely popular songs to encompass many older traditional songs, aiming to spread the popularity of the book to a wider audience. It is now an invaluable source of historical reference providing wealth of information.

The second edition followed in the following year of 1863.

1864 saw the third edition now entitled A Choice Collection of Tyneside Songs by E. Corvan, G. Ridley, J.P. Robson, R. Emery ... etc.

In 1872, a further edition was published.

The edition of 1873 was called A Choice Collection of Tyneside Songs by Wilson, Corvan, Mitford, Gilcrhrist, Robson, Harrison, Emery, Ridley, Oliver, Shield, &c,. &c., &c., with lives of the authors illustrated with views of the town and portraits of the poets and eccentrics of Newcastle. It was published by Allan, 62 Dean Street, Newcastle upon Tyne: & 16 Collingwood Street, North Shields. ("Ralph Allan, Tyne Street, Newcastle upon Tyne" was also mentioned on the cover, possibly as a seller)

The final edition was published in 1891 and was now called Allan's Illustrated Edition of Tyneside Songs and Readings with lives, portraits and autographs of the writers and notes on the songs. Revised edition. The publisher was Thomas and George Allan, 18 Blackett Street and 34 Collingwood Street, Newcastle upon Tyne, and the cover stated that it was "Sold by W Allan, 80 Grainger Street & B Allan, North Shields: & W Scott of London".

== See also ==
- Geordie dialect words
