= The Newcastle Songster by John Marshall =

Book by John Marshall

The Newcastle Songster, by John Marshall
- Author: John Marshall (Newcastle publisher and printer)
- Language: English (Geordie dialect)
- Genre: chapbook
- Publisher: John Marshall (Newcastle publisher and printer)
- Publication date: between ca1812 and 1826
- Publication place: United Kingdom
- Media type: Print
- Pages: In 6 parts, each of 24 pages

The Newcastle Songster, by John Marshall is a volume of six chapbooks, giving the lyrics of local, now historical songs, but virtually no other information. It was published by John Marshall in stages between 1812 and 1826.

== Details ==
The Newcastle Songster, by John Marshall (full title – "The Newcastle Songster; being a choice collection of Songs, Descriptive of the Language and Manners of the Common People of Newcastle upon Tyne And the neighbourhood" (the latter parts suffixed with "part II", " part III" etc.) is a volume of 6 Chapbook style books of Geordie folk songs, each consisting of 24 pages and a grand total of 72 song lyrics, published ca 1812, 1812, 1814, 1821, 1824 and 1826 respectively. The books were published and printed by John Marshall, one of the most prominent chapbook printers in Newcastle during the early nineteenth century. The books are undated and it is difficult to give an accurate date, but the fact that John Marshall did not move into the Flesh Market premises until 1811, dates them not before that date. Several of the later books can be dated approximately from the events, or dates within the titles. The first volumes appeared around the same time as John Bell's Rhymes of Northern Bards, published in 1812,. The six volume set of books contain some of the region's traditional songs and generally seem to stick to the same formulae as many other Chapbooks in using the same, or similar, well known songs. There are however a few "different" unusual and rare songs which do not appear in many other similar publications. It is assumed that these books, due to the content, would have been very popular with local population.

== The publication ==
It is, as the title suggests, a collection of songs which would have been popular, or topical, at the date of publication (or some time before). There is nothing at all in the way of biographies of any of the writers and virtually no details or histories of the events.

The front cover of the book was as thus :-

THE
NEWCASTLE
SONGSTER
Being a Choice Collection of
SONGS,
Descriptive of the Language and Manners of the
Common People of
NEWCASTLE UPON TYNE
And the Neighbourhood
– - – - – - – - – -
No pompous strains, nor labour'd lines are here,
But genuine wit and sportive mirth appear:
Northumbria's genius in her simple rhymes,
Shall live an emblem to succeeding times.
– - – - – - – - – -
Newcastle upon Tyne:
Printed by J. Marshall, in the Old Flesh-Market.
Where here also may be had, a large and curious Assortment
of Songs, Ballads, Tales, Histories, &c.

vol	page	title	songwriter	tune	comments	Notes	Ref
1		part 1					
1		front cover					
1	2	New Keel Row (The)	Thomas Thompson		maybe written c1815	A-T1	
1	4	(Weel May) The Keel Row					
1	4	Bonny Keel Laddie – (The)		The Bonny Pit Laddie		Tune-BS	
1	5	Ma' Canny Hinny					
1	6	Little Pee Dee (The)					
1	8	Election Song 1812 – Newcastle	Thomas Thompson		sung by the author at the Election on Saturday 10 October 1812	A-T1	
1	9	Bonny Geatsiders 1805 (The)	John Shield			A-S2	
1	11	Quayside Shaver – (The)	William Stephenson			A-S5	
1	13	Walker Pits		Off She Goes			
1	14	Bob Cranky's Adieu	John Shield			A-S2	
1	16	Swalwell Hopping	John Selkirk			A-S1	
1	19	Sandgate Girl's Lamentation (The)					
1	21	Canny Newcastle	Thomas Thompson			A-T1	
1	23	Dol Li A		Dolia	described as "A song sung in Newcastle about the Years 1792-3-4"	Tune-FA	
1	24	South Shields Song on the Sailors – (A)			consists of one verse		
1	24	North Shields Song – (A)			consists of one verse		
1	24	FINIS					
2		part II					
2		front cover					
2	2	Skipper's Wedding – (The)	William Stephenson	The night before Larry was stretched		A-S5 & Tune-A	
2	4	Newcastle Fair October 1811 – or The Pitman Drinking Jackey	James Stawpert	Drop of Brandy		A-S3 & Tune-B	
2	5	Newcastle Beer	John Cunningham				
2	7	Water of Tyne (The)					
2	8	Newcastle Signs (The)	Cecil Pitt	not given	sung at Newcastle Theatre Royal by Mr Scrifen, 4 June 1806	F-P2	
2	10	Bob Cranky's 'Size Sunday	John Selkirk			A-S1	
2	13	Collier's Rant (The)					
2	15	Pitman's Revenge against Bonaparte – (The)	George Cameron			A-C1	
2	17	Colliers' Pay Week (The)	Henry Robson			A-R1	
2	23	Jesmond Mill	Phill "Primrose" Hodgson		also "Phill" and "Primrose"	F-H1	
2		FINIS					
3		part III					
3		front cover					
3	2	Cappy – or The Pitman's Dog	William Mitford	Chapter of donkies		A-M1	
3	3	X. Y. Z. At Newcastle Races, 1814 (or Pitmen's Luck)	William Mitford			F-M1	
3	6	Bob Cranky's 'Leum'nation Neet	John Shield			F-S2	
3	9	Politicians – (The)		Newcastle Fair			
3	11	Tyne Cossacks (The)	W Mitford	The Bold Dragoon		F-M1	
3	13	Local Militia-Man (The)	William Mitford	Madame Fig's Gala		F-M1	
3	15	Winlaton Hopping	John Leonard	Paddy's Wedding	sometimes called "Winlaton Hoppin'"	A-L1	
3	18	Bob Cranky's account of the ascent of Mr. Sadler's balloon, from Newcastle	W Mitford		1 September 1815	F-M1	
3	21	Pitman's visit to Newcastle on Valentine's Day – (A)		Newcastle Fair			
3	24	Petition from the women of the Vegetable Market to the mayor of Newcastle – (A)		John Anderson my Jo			
3		FINIS – J Marshall, Printer, Newcastle					
4		part IV					
4		front cover					
4	2	section A – Coronation Songs					
4	2	Invitation to the Mansion House Dinner (In honour of the Coronation)			In this book it is named "Invitation to the Newcastle dinner"		
4	3	Newcastle Shepherd's Proclamation			signed – Pygstye Court Sandhill, 12 July 1821		
4	4	comment of the colloquial names of the rich and poor					
4	5	Golden Horns (The) (or The General Invitation)					
4	5	Loyal Festivities! – or novel Scenes in Newcastle			A popular song in the New Farce of the coronation as it was performed at Newcastle upon Tyne on Thursday, 19 July 1821. Sung by the 'Swinish Multitude' in full chorus.		
4	8	Coronation Ox Feast – (The) Given by the Corporation to the Gothamites					
4	9	section B – General songs					
4	9	Newcastle Noodles (The)	James Morrison	Canny Newcassel		Tune-Fr	
4	10	Loyal Address – (The)					
4	12	British Justice – or Newcastle Privy Court		Auld Lang Syne		Tune-FA	
4	15	T**ly's best blood			A North Shields Song		
4	15	Newcastle Theatre in an uproar – (The)			With the Bear, the Horses, and the Dogs, as principal Performers		
4	18	Famed Filly Fair – or A peep in Pilgrim Street on a Sunday Neet					
4	20						
4	21	Permanent Yeast	John Morrison – see Z-1			Z-1	
4	23	Nanny of the Tyne	John Gibson			F-G1	
4	24	Green Wives Lamentation (The)					
4	24	FINIS					
5		part V					
5		front cover					
5	2	Keelman's Stick – (The)					
5	3	Keelman's Lamentation		Lancashire Dick			
5	4	Skipper's Account of the Orangemen's Procession (The)					
5	6	Skipper's Dream (The)	T Moor			A-M3	
5	8	Sandhill Monkey (The)	William Stephenson	Drops of Brandy		A-S4 & Tune-A	
5	10	Fox Caught in a Brewhouse (The)		Good morrow to your Night Cap			
5	11	Hell's Kitchen				Tune-Fr	
5	14	Tim Tunbelly	William Oliver	Canny Newcassel		F-O1	
5	15	Newcastle Hackneys (The)					
5	16	Bold Archy Drowned	Robert Gilchrist		Composed on hearing a false report of the death of that celebrated character	A-G2	
5	19	Tommy C**r in Limbo	Oliver	Scots wha ha'e wi' Wallace bled	Thomas Carr, Captain of the Watch 1823	F-O1 & Tune-F	
5	20	Hackney Coach Customers – or Newcastle Wonders	Robert Emery	not given	Named plain "Newcastle Wonders"	A-E1	
5	21	Newcassel Props (The)	William Oliver			F-O1	
5	23	Kitty Port Admiral at the Bench (The) (or Dogberry in the Suds)	Wm Watson	The Opera Hat		Fr-W1	
5	24	FINIS – J Marshall, Printer, Newcastle					
6		part VI					
6	1	front cover					
6	2	Pitman's Pay (The) (or A Night's Discharge To Care)	Thomas Wilson			F-W2	
6	16	Jossy's Nag's Head		A rampant lion is my sign			
6	19	April Gowk (The) (or The Lover's Alarmed)	R Gilchrist		A Castle-Garth ditty	F-G2	
6	21	Fish-Wives' Complaint (The) (on Their Removal from Sandhill to the New Fish Market)	R Emery	Sleeping Maggie	moved on 2 January 1826		
6	23	New Fish Market – (The)	Wm Mitford	Scots, come o'er the border			
6	24	Keelmen and the Grindstone	Armstrong				
6	24	FINIS					

=== Notes ===
A-C1 – according to Allan's Tyneside Songs and Readings of 1891, the writer is George Cameron
A-E1 – according to Allan's Tyneside Songs and Readings of 1891, the writer is Robert Emery
A-G2 – according to Allan's Tyneside Songs and Readings of 1891, the writer is Robert Gilchrist
A-L1 – according to Allan's Tyneside Songs and Readings of 1891, the writer is John Leonard
A-M1 – according to Allan's Tyneside Songs and Readings of 1891, the writer is William Mitford
A-M3 – according to Allan's Tyneside Songs and Readings of 1891, the writer is T Moor
A-R1 – according to Allan's Tyneside Songs and Readings of 1891, the writer is Henry Robson
A-S1 – according to Allan's Tyneside Songs and Readings of 1891, the writer is John Selkirk
A-S2 – according to Allan's Tyneside Songs and Readings of 1891, the writer is John Shield
A-S3 – according to Allan's Tyneside Songs and Readings of 1891, the writer is James Stawpert
A-S4 – according to Allan's Tyneside Songs and Readings of 1891, the writer is William Stephenson
A-S5 – according to Allan's Tyneside Songs and Readings of 1891, the writer is William Stephenson
A-T1 – according to Allan's Tyneside Songs and Readings of 1891, the writer is Thomas Thompson
F-G1 – according to Fordyce's Tyne Songster of 1840, the writer is John Gibson
F-G2 – according to Fordyce's Tyne Songster of 1840, the writer is Robert Gilchrist
F-H1 – according to Fordyce's Tyne Songster of 1840, the writer is Phil Hodgson
F-M1 – according to Fordyce's Tyne Songster of 1840, the writer is William Mitford
F-O1 – according to Fordyce's Tyne Songster of 1840, the writer is William Oliver
F-P2 – according to Fordyce's Tyne Songster of 1840, the writer is Cecil Pitt
F-S2 – according to Fordyce's Tyne Songster of 1840, the writer is John Shield
F-W2 – according to Fordyce's Tyne Songster of 1840, the writer is Thomas Wilson
Fr-W1 – according to France's Songs of the Bards of the Tyne – 1850, the writer is William Watson
Tune-A -The tune is not given in the book – but it has been added as attributed in Thomas Allan's Tyneside Songs and Readings of 1891
Tune-B -The tune is not given in the book – but it has been added as attributed in John Bell's Rhymes of Northern Bards 1812
Tune-BS -The tune is not given in the book – but it has been added as attributed in Northumbrian Minstrelsy of 1882 by Bruce and Stokoe
Tune-F -The tune is not given in the book – but it has been added as attributed in Fordyce's Tyne Songster of 1840
Tune-FA -The tune is not given in the book – but it has been added according to FARNE Folk archive resources North East
Tune-Fr -The tune is not given in the book – but it has been added as attributed in France's Songs of the Bards of the Tyne – 1850
Z-1 – France's Songs of the Bards of the Tyne – 1850, Fordyce's Tyne Songster of 1840 and Allan's Tyneside Songs and Readings of 1891 give the author as John Morrison, but in this book it is stated as James Morrison

== See also ==
- Geordie dialect words
