= Geordie songwriter aliases =

Many Geordie songwriters used aliases, for whatever reason. This article lists many of these aliases, giving in some cases, where known, the real name, and in others, some of the songs or poems attributed to them.

== Background ==
In the 18th and 19th centuries, particularly the early and middle 19th century, there was a plethora of songwriters. Nowhere was this more so than in the North East of England. Then, as today, numerous writers sold their works and received no acknowledgement.

This is illustrated with the dealings of James Catnach (printer and publisher) of Seven Dials in London, where the payment to the author was always the same – one shilling, unless the printer thought there was something exceptional, in which case he would "throw in a penny or two over" – and in all cases the works are printed as being anonymous with no credit to the writer..

In other cases some authors wishing anonymity, would use an alias, pseudonym, stage name or nickname. This article attempts to deal with many of these.

== The aliases, pseudonyms, stage names and nicknames ==
=== Pseudonyms ===
- Bailey

In Fordyce's Tyne Songster, the song "The Skipper's Fright" was attributed to "J. N.", but the Index shows it written by "Bailey".

The songs written by "Bailey" or "J. N." include :-

1. The Skipper's Fright, to the tune of Skipper Carr And Marky Dunn – appears in Fordyce's Tyne Songster page 322
2. Newcastle Market, to the tune of Adam and Eve – appears in Ross' Songs of the Tyne volume 7-page 13
- Black, Geordy

A stage name often used by Rowland Harrison, particularly when singing his own song Geordy Black

- Blind Willy – The nickname of William Purvis
- Bobby Cure (The) – One of the stage names of/characters played by George "Geordie" Ridley
- Cat Gut Jim – One of the stage names used or character played by Edward Corvan
- Clarinda

Real name unknown Among the songs written by Clarinda are :-

1. The Patriot Volunteers (or Loyalty Display'd) – appears in Bell's Rhymes of Northern Bards page 310
- Corvan, Edward – sometimes used the alias "Cat Gut Jim" – see Edward Corvan
- Cosgrove James – used the alias J C Scatter – see James Cosgrove
- Edward Corvan – sometimes used the alias "Cat Gut Jim" – see Edward Corvan
- Geordie

Real name unknown Among the songs written by Geordie is :-

1. Shipley's Drop frae the Cloods, published in the Shields Gazette – appears in Allan's Tyneside Songs page 575
- Geordy Black

A stage name often used by Rowland Harrison, particularly when singing his own song Geordy Black

- George Ridley – Johnny Luik Up and The Bobby Cure are both stage name used by George Ridley
- Harry Haldane – An alias, used in most of his poetry and song writing, by Richard Oliver Heslop
- Harrison, Rowland – often uses the alias Geordy Black, particularly when singing the song Geordy Black
- Havadab

The person using this alias is unknown other than that he is from Shieldfield and had at least two pieces printed in "The Weekly Chronicle". Among the songs attributed to Havadab are the following :-

1. Gone – published in the Weekly Chronicle – appears in Allan's Tyneside Songs page 573
2. Ma Singin' Freend – published in the Weekly Chronicle – appears in Allan's Tyneside Songs page 573
- Richard Oliver Heslop used the pseudonym "Harry Haldane" when publishing most of his poetry and songs
- Johnny Luik up – One of the stage names of/characters played by George "Geordie" Ridley
- Purvis, William – see William Purvis (Blind Willie)
- Ridley, George

The Bobby Cure and Johnny Luik Up – are both stage name used by George Ridley – see George "Geordie" Ridley

- Rosalinda – originally named as "Bosalinda"

Originally thought by Thomas Allan in his book Allan's Tyneside Songs to have possibly have been a Miss Harrey of Newcastle, it is now generally accepted as being a pen name used by Robert Gilchrist The following is attributed to the name of Rosalinda :-

1. Pandon Dene – appears in Allan's Tyneside Songs on page 16, Bell's Rhymes of Northern Bards on page 59, Fordyce's Tyne Songster on page 156, France's Songs of the Bards of the Tyne on page 305, Marshall's Collection of Songs 1827 on page 145 and Ross' Songs of the Tyne volume 8-page 3
- Rowland Harrison – often uses the alias Geordy Black, particularly when singing the song Geordy Black
- J. C. Scatter – stage name of James Cosgrove
- Songster

The person using this alias is unknown. One of the songs written by "Songster" is :-

1. Shields Races, sung to the tune of The de'il cam' fiddling through the toon – appears in France's Songs of the Bards of the Tyne page 492
- By a Spectator

The person signing their name as "by a spectator" is unknown, but wrote the following song :-

1. Monkseaton Races – 1 July, 1812 – appears in Bell's Rhymes of Northern Bards page 307

=== The use of initials ===
J. B. The writer's real name is unknown, but it has been suggested that it may have been Joshua L. Bagnall. However there are no reasons given as to any evidence to support this suggestion. The following is attributed to their name :-

1. The Misfortunes of Roger and His Wife, to the tune of Calder Fair -and appears in Marshall's Collection of Songs 1827 page 172 and Fordyce's Tyne Songster page 172
- W. B. of Gateshead

The writer's real name is unknown, but the following is attributed to their name :-

1. The Bluebell of Gateshead – appears in Bell's Rhymes of Northern Bards page 61
- D. C.

The writer's real name is unknown, but the following is attributed to their name :-

1. The Skipper's Voyage to the Museum, to the tune of Barbara Bell – appears in France's Songs of the Bards of the Tyne page 524
- J. C.

The writer's real name is unknown, but the following is attributed to their name :-

1. Song – 5 July 1810 – appears in Bell's Rhymes of Northern Bards page 236
- D ---

The writer's real name is unknown, but the following is attributed to their name :-

1. My Canny Wife (My), to the tune of There's nae luck about the house – appears in France's Songs of the Bards of the Tyne page 465
2. Sweet Tibbie Dunbar, to the tune of The Boys of Kilkenny – appears in France's Songs of the Bards of the Tyne page 443
3. Willy Wier, to the tune of Lass o' Gowrie – appears in France's Songs of the Bards of the Tyne page 503
4. Young Mary, Queen of Hearts!, to the tune of The Boatie Row – appears in France's Songs of the Bards of the Tyne page 451
5. Half-Drowned Skipper (The) – appears in Allan's Tyneside Songs page 153. It had first appeared (signed D.) in the Tyneside Minstrel of 1824.
6. Canny Wife's reply, to the tune of Auld Lang Syne – appears in France's Songs of the Bards of the Tyne page 505
- A. F. of Lead Gate

The writer's real name is unknown, but the following is attributed to their name :-

1. Wylam Geordy – appears in Allan's Tyneside Songs page 570
- P. G.

Thomas Allan in his book, Allan's Tyneside Songs suggests that this was probably a Mr P. Galloway, a member of the Corinthian Society of Newcastle upon Tyne. The following are attributed to his name :-

1. A Lament on the death of Alexander Donktn, a young man of twenty-four, dies on 12 February 1825 – appears in Allan's Tyneside Songs page 232
2. Poem – first delivered 29 August 1827 at the local Corinthians meeting – appears in Allan's Tyneside Songs page 230
3. Poem To the Memory of Richard Young, R. Young – a member of the Corinthians, who died 4 November, 1831, aged 29 – appears in Allan's Tyneside Songs page 232
- D. H.

Thomas Allan in his book, Allan's Tyneside Songs suggests that this was probably a Mr D. Hobkirk q.v.

- H. F. H.

The writer's real name is unknown, but John Bell in his book, Bell's Rhymes of Northern Bards states that it was written and sung by H. R. H. at the opening. The following is attributed to his name :-

1. Song (A) at the opening of Jarrow Colliery (Opened on 26 September 1805) written and sung by HFH – appears in Bell's Rhymes of Northern Bards page 304
- K

The writer's real name is unknown, but the following is attributed to their name :-

1. Picking of lillies the other day, I saw a ship sailing on the main (actual title unknown) – appears in Sharp's Bishoprick Garland 1834 on page 65. (NOTE – The incorrect spelling is at it appears in the book)
- J. L.

The writer's real name is unknown, but the following is attributed to their name :-

1. The Tyne (A Fragment only) – appears in Bell's Rhymes of Northern Bards page 322
- J. N. is the pseudonym of Bailey (according to Fordyce) – see Bailey (above)
- T. R.

The writer's real name is unknown, but the following is attributed to their name :-

1. An Elegy to the Memory of the Right Honourable Lord Ravensworth – appears in Bell's Rhymes of Northern Bards page 99
- J. S.

Round about the date of the writing of this work there were three major poet/songwriters, all writing Geordie songs, and all three having a habit of (quite properly of course) signing of some of their works as "J. S." – John Shield, John Selkirk and James Stawpert. The writer of the following song, "Cull, Alias Silly Billy", is unknown (it may have been one of the three, or someone else), but it is attributed, according to John Bell, to J. S. :-

1. Cull, Alias Silly Billy – Published in Newcastle Chronicle on 28 August 1802 – appears in Bell's Rhymes of Northern Bards page 312
- E W

The writer's real name is unknown, but the following is attributed to their name :-

1. The Battle of Humbledown Hill (fought 5 August 1791) – appears in Bell's Rhymes of Northern Bards page 152
- M W of North Shields

The writer's real name is unknown, but the following is attributed to their name :-

1. Sunderland Bridge – appears in Bell's Rhymes of Northern Bards page 285 and Sharp's Bishoprick Garland 1834 on page 72

=== Nicknames of some of the Eccentrics ===
- Archy, or Archibald Henderson – was known by the nickname Bold Archy (or Airchy) – see Eccentrics
- Billy Conolly – an alias of William Cleghorn
- Bold Archy (or Airchy) is the nickname of Archibald Henderson – see Eccentrics
- Cleghorn, William – used the alias of Billy Conolly – see William Cleghorn
- Cat Gut Jim – was a stage name and a character acted out on stage by Edward Corvan
- Conolly, Billy – an alias of William Cleghorn
- Corvan, Edward – used the stage name and acted out the part of "Cat Gut Jim – see Edward Corvan
- Cruddace, Robert – was known by the nickname Whin Bob – see Eccentrics
- Cuckoo Jack -is the nickname of John Wilson – see Eccentrics
- Cuddy Billy -is the nickname of William Maclachlan – see Eccentrics
- Cull Billy -is the nickname of William Scott – see Eccentrics
- Edward Corvan – used the stage name and acted out the part of "Cat Gut Jim – see Edward Corvan
- Henderson, Archibald – was known by the nickname Bold Archy (or Airchy) – see Eccentrics
- John Wilson – was known by the nickname Cuckoo Jack – see Eccentrics
- Maclachlan William – was known by the nickname Cuddy Billy – see Eccentrics
- Robert Cruddace – was known by the nickname Whin Bob – see Eccentrics
- Scott William – was known by the nickname Cull (or silly) Billy – see Eccentrics
- Silly Billy -is the nickname of William Scott – see Eccentrics
- Whin Bob -is the nickname of Robert Cruddace – see Eccentrics
- William Cleghorn – used the alias of Billy Conolly – see William Cleghorn
- Wilson, John – was known by the nickname Cuckoo Jack – see Eccentrics

== See also ==
- Geordie dialect words
- Thomas Allan
- Allan's Illustrated Edition of Tyneside Songs and Readings
- W & T Fordyce
- Fordyce's Tyne Songster
- P. France & Co.
- France's Songs of the Bards of the Tyne - 1850
- John Marshall
- Marshall's Collection of Songs, Comic, Satirical 1827
- John Ross
- The Songs of the Tyne by Ross
- Sharp's Bishoprick Garland 1834
- Thomas Marshall
- Marshall's A Collection of original local songs
- The Newcastle Eccentrics of the 19th century
