= Marshall's Collection of Songs, Comic, Satirical 1827 =

Songbook published by John Marshall

Marshall's Collection of Songs, Comic, Satirical
- Author: John Marshall
- Language: English (Geordie dialect)
- Genre: chapbook
- Publisher: John Marshall
- Publication date: 1827
- Publication place: United Kingdom
- Media type: Print
- Pages: approx. 230 pages

Marshall's Collection of Songs, Comic, Satirical is a chapbook style songbook, giving the lyrics of local, now historical songs, with a few bits of other information. It was published by John Marshall in 1827.

== Details ==
Marshall's Collection of Songs, Comic, Satirical 1827 (full title – "A Collection of Songs, Comic, Satirical, and Descriptive, chiefly in the Newcastle Dialect, and illustrative of the language and manners of the common people on the Banks of the Tyne and neighbourhood. By T. Thompson, J. Shields, W. Mitford, H Robson, and Others. Newcastle upon Tyne, Printed by John Marshal in the Old Flesh Market 1827) is a Chapbook style book of Geordie folk songs consisting of approx. 230 pages and over 130 song lyrics approximately 230 pages and over 130 song lyrics, published in 1827.

== The publication ==
It is, as the title suggests, a collection of songs which would have been popular, or topical, at the date of publication. There is very little in the way of biographies of any of the writers or histories of the events.

The front cover of the book was as thus :-

A
COLLECTION
OF
SONGS
Comic, Satirical, and Descriptive ,
CHIEFLY IN THE,
NEWCASTLE DIA;ECT
And illustrative of the Language and Manners of the Common
People on the Banks of the Tyne and Neighbourhood .
BY T. THOMPSON, J. SHIELD, W. MIDFORD ,
H ROBSON, AND OTHERS .

NEWCASTLE UPON TYNE:
PRINTED BY JOHN MARSHALL
IN THE OLD FLESH MARKET
1827

== Contents ==
Are as below :

page	title	songwriter	tune	comments	Notes	Ref
	PART I – introduction etc.					
i	The Editors Address					
1	Contents					
5	PART II – the main section					
5	(Weel May) The Keel Row	Traditional	not given			
5	New Keel Row	Thomas Thompson	not given			
7	Canny Newcassel	Thomas Thompson	not given			
10	Jemmy Joneson’s Whurry	Thomas Thompson	not given			
12	Newcastle Election Song	Thomas Thompson	not given	sung by author at Election Dinner at Turks Heads Inn, Bigg Market, Saturday 10 Oct 1812		
13	Bonny Keel Laddie (The)	not given	not given			
14	Maw Canny Hinny	not given	not given			
15	Little Pee Dee (The)	not given	not given			
16	Amphitrite – (The)	Robert Gilchrist	not given			
17	Jenny Howlett (The) – or Lizzie Mudie's Ghost	William Armstrong	not given	not written by R Gilchrist	F-A1	
18	Coaly Tyne	Robert Gilchrist	Auld Lang Syne	author not given by others	A-Tune08	
20	Tyne (The) – song number 1	John Gibson	not given			
21	Nanny of the Tyne	John Gibson	not given	Entry duplicated – see page 146	F-G1	
22	Bob Cranky's Adieu	John Shield	not given			
23	Bonny Geatsiders 1805 (The)	John Shield	Bob Cranky			
25	Bob Cranky's 'Size Sunday	John Selkirk	not given			
28	Bob Cranky's 'Leum'nation Neet	John Shield	not given	For the Victory obtained at Waterloo	A-S2	
30	Swalwell Hopping	John Selkirk	Paddy's Wedding		A-S1 & A-Tune03	
33	Winlaton Hoppin'	John Leonard	not given	writer's name spelt as John Lennard		
35	Skipper's Wedding (The)	William Stephenson Senior	not given		A-S5	
37	Newcastle Fair October 1811 – or The Pitman Drinking Jackey	James Stawpert	not given		A-S3	
39	Quayside Shaver (The)	William Stephenson Senior	not given	At this time, on the Quay were people, mainly female, who carried out the trade of barber, out on the street	A-S5	
41	Sandgate Girl's Lamentation (The)	not given	not given			
42	Water of Tyne (The)	not given	not given			
42	Newcastle Signs	Cecil Pitt	not given	sung at Newcastle Theatre Royal by Mr Scrifen, 4 June 1806		
44	Collier's Rant (The)	unknown	not given			
45	Pitman's Revenge against Bonaparte – (The)	George Cameron	not given		A-C1	
47	Pitman's Courtship – (The)	William Mitford	not given	author given as William Midford		
49	Cappy, or the Pitman's Dog	William Mitford	not given	author given as William Midford		
50	X. Y. Z. At Newcastle Races, 1814 (or Pitmen's Luck)	William Mitford	not given	actually called X. Y. Z. at the races in this book – author as "William Midford" in index		
53	Eagle Steam Packet (The) – (or A Trip to Sunderland)	William Mitford	not given	author given as William Midford		
54	Wonderful Gutter (The)	William Mitford	not given	author as "William Midford" in index		
56	Tyne Cossacks (The)	W Mitford	not given	author as "William Midford" in index		
58	Pitman's Ramble (The) – or Newcastle Finery	William Mitford	not given			
60	Pitman's Skellyscope (The)	William Mitford	Polly Parker, O	author as "William Midford" in index	Fr-Tune07	
61	Local Militia-Man (The)	William Mitford	Madam Figg's Gala	author as "William Midford" in index		
63	Masquerade at Newcastle Theatre (or The Pitman Turned Critic)	William Mitford	not given	author as "William Midford" in index		
66	Newcastle Races	William Watson	not given			
68	Glister (The)	William Armstrong	not given		F-A1	
69	Baboon (The)	William Armstrong	not given		F-A1	
70	Till the Tide comes in.	Henry Robson	not given	or "Came in" or "Cums in"	A-R1	
70	Sandgate Lassie's Lament (The)	Henry Robson	Bonny Pit Laddie		A-R1 & A-Tune10	
71	The Politicians	T R Valentine of Gateshead	not given			
73	Nancy Wilkinson	Henry Robson	Duncan Davison		F-R2 & R-Tune02	
74	Billy Oliver's Ramble (Between Benwell and Newcastle)	unknown	not given			
75	Bob Crank's Account of the Ascent of Mr. Sadler's Balloon	not given	not given	from Newcastle 1 Sep 1815		
78	Green's Balloon	not given	Barbara Bell		A-Tune09	
78	short bio	Messrs Green		and the balloon		
80	Newgate Street Petition to Mr. Mayor (The)	anon – but suggested as John Shield	not given		A-4	
83	Burdon's Address to the cavalry – A parody	James Morrison	Scots Wha Hae		A-Tune06	
83	Collier's Keek at the Nation (The)	Robert Gilchrist	not given			
85	Blind Willy Singing	Robert Gilchrist	not given	spelt Willie in index		
87	Bold Archy and Blind Willie's Lament (On the Death of Captain Starkey)	Robert Gilchrist	not given	spelt Airchy in the index		
88	Quack Doctors (The)	Robert Gilchrist	not given			
90	Voyage to Lunnin (A)	Robert Gilchrist	not given			
93	Newcassel Props (The)	William Oliver	not given		F-O1	
95	Newcassel Wonders	not given	not given			
96	Tim Turnbelly	William Oliver	Canny Newcassel		F-O1	
97	Keel Row (The) – (Weel May The Keel Row – that get's the Bairns their Breed)	not given	not given			
98	My Lord 'Size – or Newcastle in an Uproar	John Shield	not given			
101	Barber's News (or Shields in an uproar)	John Shield	Miss Bailey's Ghost		Fr-Tune02	
105	O, No, my Love, no	John Shield	not given			
106	Bonassus (The)	William Oliver	Jemmy Joneson's Whurry		A-Tune04	
108	Shield's Chain Bridge, Humourously Described by a Pitman	William Oliver	not given	note archaic spelling of Humourously	F-O1	
110	Collier's Pay Week (The)	Henry Robson	not given			
110	short bio	Henry Robson	not given			
116	Tyne (The) – song number 2	Henry Robson	not given	In Britain's Blessed Island		
117	Spring (The)	Henry Robson	not given	written early in May 1809		
118	Parson Malthus	Henry Robson	Ranting Roaring Willie			
119	Peggy Waggy	Henry Robson	not given	written Feb 1826		
120	Bessy of Blyth (A Virtuous Woman is More Precious Than Rubies)	Henry Robson	not given	written Feb 1826		
121	To Anna	Henry Robson	not given			
121	To Kelvin Grove we'll go – The Lassie's Reply	Henry Robson	not given			
122	Peter Watson (To Mr) – (Who lays powerful bats on the knaves with fire-shovel hats on)	Henry Robson	not given			
122	short bio	Mr Peter Watson		Opposed the claims of the Government Clergy for the Easter Dues or "Clerical Tax" – written 1824		
124	Fish-Wives' Complaint (The) (on Their Removal from Sandhill to the New Fish Market on 2 January 1826)	Robert Emery	Sleeping Maggie			
125	New Fish Market	William Mitford	Scots come o'er the Border	author as "William Midford" in index		
126	New Year's Carol for the Fishwives	Metcalfe Ross	Chevy Chase			
127	Jesmond Mill	Phil Hodgson	not given			
128	Tommy Thompson	Robert Gilchrist	not given	a tribute to T.T.		
129	Farewell to the Tyne	Robert Gilchrist	not given			
130	Northumberland Free O' Newcastle	Robert Gilchrist	not given	On the Duke of Northumberland being given the freedom of Newcastle		
131	Duchess And Mayoress (The)	not given	The Young May Moon	written Sept 1819	F-Tune3	
133	Newcastle Assizes (Duchess verses Mayoress)	not given	not given	(or A Struggle For Precedence)	F-Tune8	
135	Coal trade (The)	not given	The Keel Row		A-Tune07	
137	Tom Carr and Waller Watson – or Tom and Jerry at Home	William Oliver	There was a Bold Dragoon		F-O1	
139	Johny Sc-tt & Tommy C-rr	not given	not given	a dialogue		
140	Tommy C-rr in Limbo	William Oliver	Scots Wha Ha'e		F-Tune12	
141	Kitty Port Admiral at the Bench (The) (or Dogberry in the Suds)	William Watson	The Opera Hat			
142	Owl (The)	Robert Emery	X. Y. Z.	written Feb 1826	F-E1	
143	comment on			public houses mentioned in "The Owl"		
144	Lovely Delia	not given	Sleeping Maggy			
145	Pandon Dean	Robert Gilchrist	Banks of Doon		Fr-G2	
146	Nanny of the Tyne	John Gibson	not given	Entry duplicated – see page 21	F-G1	
147	Newcastle Hackneys (The)	not given	not given			
148	Newcastle Hackney Coaches	William Oliver	The Bold Dragoon		F-O1	
149	Newcastle Wonders, or Hackney Coach Customers	Robert Emery	Gee, Ho, Dobbin			
151	Newcastle Improvements	R.Charlton	Canny Newcassel			
152	Come Up to the Scratch – (or The Pitman Haggish'd)	Robert Emery	Calder Fair			
154	Pitman's dream (The) – or A description of the North Pole	Robert Emery	Newcastle Fair			
156	Pitman's Dream (The) – or His description of the Kitchen	Robert Emery	Hell's Kitchen			
158	Hydrophobie – or The Skipper and the Quaker	R Emery	Good Morrow to your Nightcap			
160	On St. Crispin's Procession – at Newcastle 30 July 1823	William Mitford	Fie, let us a' to the bridal	author as "William Midford" in index		
161	Crispin's Volunteers	William Mitford	The British Grenadiers	entitled "St Crispin's" and author as "William Midford" in index		
163	Famed Filly Fair – or A peep in Pilgrim Street on a Sunday Neet	not given	not given			
165	Keelman and the Grindstone (The)	William Armstrong	Derry Down		R-Tune01	
166	Tinsley's Best Blood	not given	not given	a North Shields Song written 1820		
166	Newcastle Noodles (The)	James Morrison	Canny Newcassel		Fr-Tune03	
168	Vicar's Loyal Address (or Loyal Address)	not given	not given			
170	British Justice (or Newcastle Privy Court)	not given	not given			
172	Misfortunes of Roger and His Wife (The)	J. B.	Calder Fair			
173	Newcastle Theatre in an Uproar	not given	not given			
175	Farewell Archy	not given	Chapter of Donkies	written in 1820		
177	Sir Tommy Made An Odd Fellow	Robert Gilchrist	Canny Newcassel	a Provincial and very popular song	F-G2 & Fr-Tune03	
178	Wreckenton Hiring	unknown	not given			
181	On Russell The Pedestrian	Russell the pedestrian	Barbara Bell		F-Tune9	
181	Short bio	Russell the pedestrian				
181	Short bio	George Wilson		Blackheath Pedestrian		
181	Short bio	John Simpson		Cumberland Pedestrian		
182	On Simpson The Pedestrian's Failure	not given	Barbara Bell			
183	Victory (The) – or The Captain Done Over	not given	Oh! The golden days of Good Queen Bess			
185	Alarm (The) – or Lord Fauconburg's March	not given	Chevy Chase			
185	comment on					
187	Sunday Eve (or Lord Fauconberg's Heel)	not given	not given			
195	Half Drowned Skipper (The)	not given	Chapter of Donkies			
196	Newcassel Worthies (The)	William Armstrong	We've aye been provided for			
198	PART III – On the Coronation					
198	Invitation to the Mansion House Dinner	William Armstrong	Scot's Wha Ha'e Wi' Wallace Bled		F-A1	
199	Newcastle Swineherd's Proclamation (The)	not given	not given			
201	Golden Horns (The) (or The General Invitation)	not given	not given			
201	Loyal Festivities – or Novel Scenes at Newcastle	not given	not given			
204	Picture of Newcastle (on George IV Coronation – second edition corrected)	William Mitford	Arthur McBride	author as "William Midford" in index	F-M1	
206	Newcastle in an Uproar (or George the Fourth's Coronation)	William Midford	Come under my Plaidie	author as "William Midford" in index	F-M1	
209	Coronation Day at Newcastle	not given	not given			
211	Coronation Thursday – 19 July 1821	William Midford	not given	The Third Epistle from Bob Fudge to his cousin Bob in the country – author given as William Midford	F-M1	
211	a mention of			The 1st and 2nd Epistles		
218	PART IV – On The Attempt To Remove The Custom House From Newcastle To Shields in 1816					
218	Custom House Branch (The) – song 1	not given	not given	"Tynesiders, give ear, and you quickly shall hear"		
219	Quayside Ditty (for February 1816)	not given	not given	for Feb 1816		
221	Custom House Tree, &c (The)	not given	The Quayside Shaver			
223	Custom House Branch (The) – song 2	not given	Yo Heave O	"The joyous men of North Shields their church bells set a ringing sweet"		
226	Bob Fudge's Postscript (to his account of the Great Town Moor Meeting Mon 11 Oct 1819)	not given	not given			
227	To the Independent Free Burgesses of Newcastle upon Tyne	not given	Fairly shot of her	Written previous to the General Election in 1826		
228	Finis & Marshall, Printer, Newcastle					

=== Notes ===
A-4 – according to George Allan's Tyneside Songs and Readings of 1891, the writer is anon – but Allan suggests that it could be John Shield
A-C1 – according to George Allan's Tyneside Songs and Readings of 1891, the writer is George Cameron
A-R1 – according to George Allan's Tyneside Songs and Readings of 1891, the writer is Henry Robson
A-S1 – according to George Allan's Tyneside Songs and Readings of 1891, the writer is John Selkirk
A-S2 – according to George Allan's Tyneside Songs and Readings of 1891, the writer is John Shield
A-S3 – according to George Allan's Tyneside Songs and Readings of 1891, the writer is James Stawpert
A-S5 – according to George Allan's Tyneside Songs and Readings of 1891, the writer is William Stephenson (senior)
A-Tune03 – according to George Allan's Tyneside Songs and Readings of 1891, the tune is "Paddy's Wedding"
A-Tune04 – according to George Allan's Tyneside Songs and Readings of 1891, the tune is "Jemmy Joneson's Whurry"
A-Tune06 – according to George Allan's Tyneside Songs and Readings of 1891, the tune is "Scots Wha Hae"
A-Tune07 – according to George Allan's Tyneside Songs and Readings of 1891, the tune is "The Keel Row"
A-Tune08 – according to George Allan's Tyneside Songs and Readings of 1891, the tune is "Auld Lang Syne"
A-Tune09 – according to George Allan's Tyneside Songs and Readings of 1891, the tune is "Barbara Bell"
A-Tune10 – according to George Allan's Tyneside Songs and Readings of 1891, the tune is "Bonny Pit Laddie"
F-A1 – according to Fordyce's Tyne Songster of 1840, the writer is William Armstrong
F-E1 – according to Fordyce's Tyne Songster of 1840, the writer is Robert Emery
F-G1 – according to Fordyce's Tyne Songster of 1840, the writer is John Gibson
F-G2 – according to Fordyce's Tyne Songster of 1840, the writer is Robert Gilchrist
F-M1 – according to Fordyce's Tyne Songster of 1840, the writer is William Mitford
F-O1 – according to Fordyce's Tyne Songster of 1840, the writer is William Oliver
F-R2 – according to Fordyce's Tyne Songster of 1840, the writer is Joseph Philip Robson
F-Tune03 – according to Fordyce's Tyne Songster of 1840, the tune is "The Young May Moon"
F-Tune08 – according to Fordyce's Tyne Songster of 1840, the tune is "We've aye been provided for"
F-Tune09 – according to Fordyce's Tyne Songster of 1840, the tune is "Barbara Bell"
F-Tune12 – according to Fordyce's Tyne Songster of 1840, the tune is "Scots Wha Hae"
Fr-G2 – according to France's Songs of the Bards of the Tyne – 1850, the writer is Robert Gilchrist
Fr-Tune02 – according to France's Songs of the Bards of the Tyne – 1850, the tune is "Miss Bailey's Ghost"
Fr-Tune03 – according to France's Songs of the Bards of the Tyne – 1850, the tune is "Canny Newcassel"
Fr-Tune07 – according to France's Songs of the Bards of the Tyne – 1850, the tune is "Polly Parker, O"
R-Tune01 – according to Ross' Songs of the Tyne of 1846, the tune is "Derry Down"
R-Tune02 – according to Ross' Songs of the Tyne of 1846, the tune is "Duncan Davison"

== See also ==
- Geordie dialect words
- John Marshall
