= Rhymes of Northern Bards =

Collection of songs from the counties of Newcastle, Northumberland and Durham

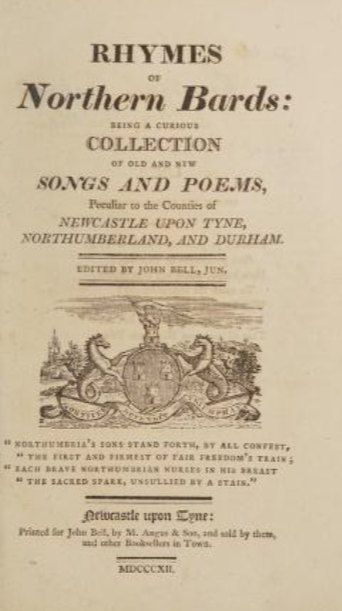
- Title page for Rhymes of Northern Bards (1812)
- Author: John Bell
- Language: English (Geordie dialect)
- Publisher: M Angus & Son
- Publication date: 1812
- Publication place: United Kingdom
- Media type: Print
- Pages: 328 pages

Rhymes of Northern Bards (full title – "Rhymes of Northern Bards: being a curious collection of old and new Songs and Poems, Peculiar to the Counties of Newcastle, Northumberland and Durham – Edited by John Bell 1812") is a book of North East England traditional and popular song consisting of approximately 200 song lyrics on over 300 pages, published in 1812. It was reprinted in 1971 by Frank Graham, Newcastle upon Tyne with an introduction by David Harker.

== The publication ==
It is, as the title suggests, a collection of songs which would have been popular, or topical, at the date of publication.

The front cover of the book was as thus :-

Rhymes
Of
Northern Bards:
being a curious
Collection
of old and new
Songs And Poems,
Peculiar to the Counties of
Newcastle upon Tyne,
Northumberland, & Durham.

Edited by John Bell, Jun.

“Northumbria’s sons stand forth, by all confest
“The first and firmest of fair freedom’s train;
“Each brave Northumbrian Nurses in his breast
“The sacred spark, unsullied by a stain.”

Newcastle upon Tyne: (printed in an old English style)
Printed for John Bell, by M. Angus & Son, and sold by them,
and other Booksellers in Town.

MDCCCXII

== Contents ==
Are as below :-

page	title	songwriter	tune	notes
1	Front fly			
2	Lines – Sent to the Editor and Printer			
3	Preface			
4	Verses on Northumberland Minstelry	H R		H R is Henry Robson
5	Weel may the Keel Row			
5	The new Keel Row	T T	the old tune	T T is Thomas Thompson
7	Bonny Keel Laddie			
8	The Little Pee Dee			
9	Ma Canny Hinny			
10	Dol Li A			A song famous in Newcastle about 1792, 1793 & 1794
11	The Tyne	J. Gibson of Newcastle		
12	Blackett's Field	J Shield of Newcastle	John Anderson My Jo	
14	River Awa'			
15	Britannia's Volunteers		The Newcastle Volunteers Quick March	
16	John Diggons	J Stawpert of Newcastle	Old England's Roast Beef	
18	Trafalgar's Battle	the same (assume J Stawpert)	Chapter of Kings	
19	Chester Well	George Pickering, late of Newcastle		
21	Newcastle Beer	John Cunningham		
23	My Lord 'Size (or Newcastle in an uproar)	J Shield of Newcastle		
25	Bob Cranky's 'Size Sunday	John Selkirk	set to music by Thomas Train of Gateshead	
27	Bob Cranky's Complaint			
29	The Bonny Geatsiders 1805		Bob Cranky	
31	Bob Cranky's Adieu	John Shield of Newcastle		on going with the Volunteer Association from Gateshead to Newcastle on permanent Duty
33	O No, My Love, No	John Shield of Newcastle		
34	Delia's Answer			
35	The Collier's Rant			
36	Walker Pits		Of She Goes	
36	The Bonny Pit Laddie			
37	The Pitman's Revenge against Buonaparte			
38	The Collier's Pay Week			
43	The Quayside Shaver			At this time, on the Quay were people, mainly female, who carried out the trade of barber, out on the street
45	Swalwell Hopping	J S of Gateshead	Paddy's Wedding	J S is John Selkirk
48	The Sandgate Girl's Lamentation			
49	A Curious Description of the City of Sandgate			"wrote" some years ago
53	The Crow's Nest			
56	A Song – An Address to the Good People of Bur-Castle			published Dec 1791
57	Sons of the Tyne – 1805			
58	Jesmond Mill	Phill Hodgson of Newcastle		
59	Pardon Dene			published Sept 1776 with title of "Rosalinda"
60	Nanny of the Tyne	J M Wedderburn of Newcastle	set to music by J Aldridge Jnr of Newcastle	
61	The Blue Bell of Gateshead	W B of Gateshead		
62	The Newcastle Signs	Cecil Pitt		sung at Newcastle Theatre Royal by Mr Scrifen, 4 June 1806
63	The Newcastle Bellman			sung at Newcastle Theatre Royal by Mr Noble 1803
66	Oxygen Gas	John Shield of Newcastle		sung at Newcastle Theatre Royal
67	The Bards of the Tyne	Published in the Tyne Mercury under initials C P	Newcastle Beer	C P (which was Charles Purvis)
68	The Answer to the Foregoing	James Stawpert		
70	The Raree Show Man			an election song 20 Sep 1780
73	Barber's News (or Shields in an Uproar)	a new song	O' the Golden Days of Good Queen Bess	
77	Song (on the flight of the young crows from Newcastle Exchange			
79	A Rare Curiosity (or Crow's Nest in Gateshead)	a new song		
81	The French Invasion			"published" 10 May 1794
84	Blyth Camps (or The Girl I Left Behind Me)			
85	Beaumont's Light Horse			
86	A Song in Praise of the Keelman Volunteers		White Cockade	
87	The Sons of the Tyne (or British Volunteers)		Hearts of Oak	
88	Mary of the Tyne			
89	Newcastle Fair – October 1811 (The Pitman a Drinking of Jacey)	J S	Drops of Brandy	J S is James Stawpert
91	The Newcastle Beauties			designed to be sung to the Harpsichord or Spinet &c
94	Song – on the Address of the Newcastle House of Lords on turning out Lord North and Mr Fox			
97	The Address of Sir J Duncan and Co on the "Scale of Cross Bank"			
98	Sketch details	one of Sir James Duncan's Bank Notes		
99	An Elegy to the Memory of the Right Honourable Lord Ravensworth			
100	Lines on the Death of John, Lord Delaval	M Harvey		
101	The Wallsend Rifle Corps			
102	Song – Written on the King's Birthday 1808		Sons of the Tyne	
103	The Token Monger – A Song		Erin go Bragh	
105	The Following Dialogue in Bad Prose was Overheard by the Person who now Attempts it in Bad Verse			December 1811
106	Footy Again The Wall			A song long sung by the Pitmen of Long Benton
107	The Battle of Otterburn	from an old MSS		battle fought 9 Aug 1388
111	A Fytte			
116	The Battle of Otterbourne			
118	The Hunting of Chyviat			
122	Fit The Second			
128	The Hunting in Chevy Chase			
136	An Old Song on the Battle of Flodden			
137	The Flowers of the Forest (or Flodden Field)			battle fought 9 Sep 1513
142	Verses on James IV of Scotland			who fell at the Battle of Flodden)
143	The Battle of Reid Squair			battle fought 7 July 1576
147	Fair Mabel of Wallington			
150	Verses (on the view of Roadley Castle, Wallington, etc.)			
152	The Battle of Humbledown Hill	E W		battle fought 5 Aug 1791
156	The Laidley Worm (of Spindleston Heugh)	by Duncan Frasier (this version by Robert Lambe, Vicar of Norham)	from an old MSS	
161	The Fisher Laddie			
161	The Kye's Come Home			
162	Song – A Lamentable Ditty made upon the Death of a Worthy Gentlemen		A Delicate Scottish Tune	George Stoole who died c1610
166	Epitaph on William Bell	Samuel Barras		Late a resident of Gateshead Fell
166	An Excellent Ballad on the Sickness, Death and Burial of Ecky's Mare			
171	Stanzas – Addressed to Northumbria	Bothwell – 2 January 1807		
173	short bio of author	Thomas Whittle		
174	Engraving of a Midford Galloway			spelt Mitford on page 173
175	The Midford Galloway's Ramble	Thomas Whittle	Ranting, Roaring Willy	
180	The Insipids (or The Mistress with her Multitude of Man Servants)	Thomas Whittle		
184	Sawney Ogilby's Duel with his Wife	Thomas Whittle		
185	Song – On William Carstairs, Schoolmaster	Thomas Whittle		
188	Thomas Whittle, his Humorous Letter to Master Moody, the Razor-Setter	Thomas Whittle		
189	The Little Priest of Felton			
190	The Felton Garland		Maggy Lauder	
195	From the Swains of Felton to the Shepherds of Lanthernside, Northumberland 1787		General F—r---'s March	
196	On the Departure of Mr Grey of Felton			
197	Carr of Etal			
198	Callaly Castle, seat of the Claverings			
200	Bedlington Tragedy – A Fragment			
202	Hotspur, A Ballad – In the Manner of the Ancient Minstrels	Mr William Richardson		
206	Legend of Sewen Shields Castle			
209	An Old Northumbrian Ballad			about the Lead-Miners of Alston Moor
210	From a Tombstone in Haltwhistle Church Yard			
211	Lines – written at an Inn on the Banks of the Allan	George Pickering		romantic part of Northumberland
211	Lucy Gray of Allendale			
212	Haltwhistle Fair			
214	Anna of the Tyne			
215	The Tyne	Henry Robson		
215	short bio of author	Henry Robson		
216	The Spring	Henry Robson		Written the beginning of May 1809
217	The Banks of the Tyne	James Wilson		
217	short bio of author	James Wilson		
218	Ode – "Addressed to Sir Walter Blackett, Bart.	James Wilson		was "wrote" by the author on the very day the building of Hexham Bridge was undertaken
219	A Few Lines on Laying the Foundation Stone of Hexham Bridge	James Wilson		
220	A Song by Mr James Wilson of Cawsey Park	James Wilson		on Mr Coughan and family, leaving Hebron Hill
221	Hobby Elliott	maybe James Robson		
221	short bio of author	James Robson		
222	The Rising of the Clans in 1715			
223	On the First Rebellion – 1715			
225	A Fragment of a Song on the Lord of Derwentwater			
225	Verses on a perspective view of Dilston Hall			home of the Lord of Derwentwater
227	Hexham Wood			
228	The Loyal Hexham Volunteers	Jasper Potts	a new song	
229	The Jolly Parson			
231	The Cockle Park Ewe's Ramble – Part I		John of Badenyon	
233	Part II			
234	Part III			
236	Song – 5 July 1810	J C		
237	The Ploughman			
237	The Flower of Rothbury Forest			
238	The Piper of Capheaton			
239	Mary Gamal, the Vicar of Kirkwhelpington's Daughter			is gone off with Nichol Clark, his Servant Man
240	Song – To Buy			
241	The Water of Tyne			
241	Andrew Carr			
242	Song – Eppie			
242	Lines – on John Thompson, who was hanged on Town Moor for Horse Stealing	---- Ogle, Schoolmaster of Gateshead		
242	The Pitman	---- Ogle, Schoolmaster of Gateshead		
243	A Song about the Conclusion of the Hunt season of the Forest Hunt, Newcastle 1786			
245	Lord Framlington Fair (or Tryst)			
247	Go All to Coquet and Woo			
248	The Fractious Farmer – A Song 1792			
250	Satyr Upon Women	James Robson		
250	short bio of author	James Robson		
251	Tweed Side			
252	A Song – Pasted on the Walls and scattered about the Town of Rothbury, several years ago			
253	Answer – The following answer was handed about at Berwick upon Tweed			and the Neighbouring Villages
256	Song – (maybe called My Eppie)			
257	Little Billy			
257	Sair Fail'd Hinny			
258	The Hare Skin	George Knight, Shoemaker	Have you heard of a frolicsome ditty	
261	Limbo	George Knight, Shoemaker	On a time I was great, now little I'm grown	
262	A New Song – for the Year 1764	William Sutton (songwriter)		
264	Stockton's Commendation		Sir John Fenwick's The flower amang them	
265	The New Way of Stockton's Commendation	Benjamin Poye L.L.D. Archdeacon of Durham	to the old tune	was actually Benjamin Pye 1791–1808
267	Hark to Winchester (or The Yorkshire Volunteer's Farewell to the good folks of Stockton)		Push about the Jorum	
269	Stockton's Commendation – 2			
271	The BarnardCastle Tragedy		Constant Anthony	
274	A Song in Praise of the Durham Militia		The Lillies of France	
275	The Lass of Cockerton		Low down in the broom	
276	Rookhope Ryde –			A Durham border song, composed 1569
281	The Sedgefield Frolic			
283	Bobby Shaftoe			
283	The Pleasures of Sunderland			
284	The Frolicsome Old Women of Sunderland (or the disappointed young maids)		They'll marry tho' threescore and ten	
285	Sunderland Bridge	by M W of North Shields		
285	Elsie Marley		to its own tune	An Alewife of Picktree near Chester-le-Street
287	Chester Lads Forever			
288	Lumley Leads to Glory			
288	Chester Volunteers		There's na luck about the house	
290	The Durham Volunteers			
291	King James I – On his Visit to Durham			on Good Friday 1617
292	Durham Old Women			
292	Epitaph on John Simpson, Hamsterley, Woolcomber	Isaac Garner		
293	Ode – To the River Derwent			
294	The Hexhamshire Lass			
296	The Northumbrian's Sigh for his Native Country			
296	A You A, Hinny Burd			
297	Up the Raw			
298	Broom Busoms			
299	Extra Verses to the Foregoing	Added by "Blind Willy"		
300	The Waggoner			
300	Brandling and Ridley			
301	My Laddie			
301	Sandgate Lassie's Lament	Henry Robson	Bonny Pit Laddie	
302	The Invitation			
304	A Song at the opening of Jarrow Colliery	written & sung by H F H		Opened on 26 Sep 1805
306	A South Shields Song – of the Sailors			
306	A North Shields Song			
307	Monkseaton Races – 1 July 1812	by a Spectator		
309	The Alarm (or Lord Fauconberg's March)			
310	The Patriot Volunteers (or Loyalty Display'd)	by Clarinda		
312	short bio of Silly Billy			
312	Cull, Alias Silly Billy	J S		Published in Newcastle Chronicle on 28 Aug 1802
313	another short bio of Silly Billy			
314	Canny Newcassel	T T of Newcastle		T T is Thomas Thompson
316	Croakum Redivivus			A Crow's account on her return to Newcastle 1812
319	unnamed – but about the "Lost" Sheriff's Gown			A Verse about the gown stolen from the Town's Court
320	The Antigallican Privateer			
321	a New Song on the Opening of Jarrow Colliery			Opened in 1803
322	The Peacock and the Hen			
322	The Tyne – A Fragment	J L		
323	Contents			
	From the Press of M Angus and Son, Newcastle			

== See also ==
- Geordie dialect words
- A Beuk o’ Newcassell Sangs Collected by Joseph Crawhall 1888
- Allan's Illustrated Edition of Tyneside Songs and Readings
- Northumbrian Minstrelsy
- Music of Northumbria
