= James Wilson (songwriter) =

18th-century songwriter from England

James Wilson was an 18th-century songwriter from Hexham, Northumberland, England.

== Life ==
James Wilson was a schoolteacher by trade.

After spending some time teaching in Hexham, he suffered financial embarrassment moved to Morpeth, where he met a fellow schoolteacher, who was also a poet and songwriter, Wallis Ogle, who found him a post at Cawsey Park Bridge School, where shortly after he died.

While living in Morpeth, Wilson collected together some of his works into a volume and they were published in a chapbook printed by T Angus, Newcastle, in 1778. He had four songs compiled in Bell's Rhymes of Northern Bards in 1812.

== Works ==
- The Banks of the Tyne
- A Few Lines on Laying the Foundation Stone of Hexham Bridge
- Ode - "Addressed to Sir Walter Blackett, Bart." - was "wrote" by the author on the very day the building of Hexham Bridge was undertaken
- A Song by Mr James Wilson of Cawsey Park on Mr Coughan and family, leaving Hebron Hill

== See also ==
- Geordie
- Rhymes of Northern Bards
