= William Stephenson (senior) =

William Stephenson (senior) (1763–1836) was a watchmaker from Gateshead, England. He worked as a schoolteacher, a poet, and a songwriter. He was also the father of William Stephenson (junior). His best known works are "The Quayside Shaver" and "The Skipper’s Wedding"

== Early life ==
William Stephenson (senior) was born in Gateshead , England on 28 June, 1763. He was one of the earliest Tyneside songwriters.

He became an apprentice with James Atkinson, the clock and watchmaker of Gateshead, and continued working there afterwards until a severe accident disabled him. After a long time out of work and a lengthy spell in the country to recuperate, he decided to change his trade. Being an educated man and something of a literary scholar, he opened a school on the Church Stairs in Gateshead and became a schoolmaster. In this he had great success and continued for the greater part of his life.

William Stephenson died on 12 August, 1836 at the age of 73.

== Works ==
Stephenson’s works include :

- "Quayside Shaver" in Bell's volume, 1812
- The Invitation - later to become The Skipper's Wedding
- Age of Eighty
- The Itinerant Confectioner
- Newcastle on Saturday Night - A Picture of Saturday Night One Hundred Years Ago (that comment written c1890)
- The Retrospect

In 1832 he collected his poems and songs (only 6 songs altogether), and published in a thin octavo volume of 112 pages, dedicated, (by permission), to the Rev. John Collinson, the then rector of Gateshead. The principal poem is entitled "The Retrospect" and introduces and deals with the eccentric and well known characters of Gateshead, as he knew it in his youth. This poem takes up almost one third of the book.

== See also ==
- Geordie dialect words
- Thomas Allan
- Allan's Illustrated Edition of Tyneside Songs and Readings
- John Bell
- Rhymes of Northern Bards
- P. France & Co.
- France's Songs of the Bards of the Tyne - 1850
- John Marshall
- Marshall's Collection of Songs, Comic, Satirical 1827
- W & T Fordyce
- The Tyne Songster
- John Ross
- The Songs of the Tyne by Ross
- William R Walker (publisher)
- The Songs of the Tyne by Walker
