= Badenyon =

Coordinates: 57°15′26″N 3°5′43″W

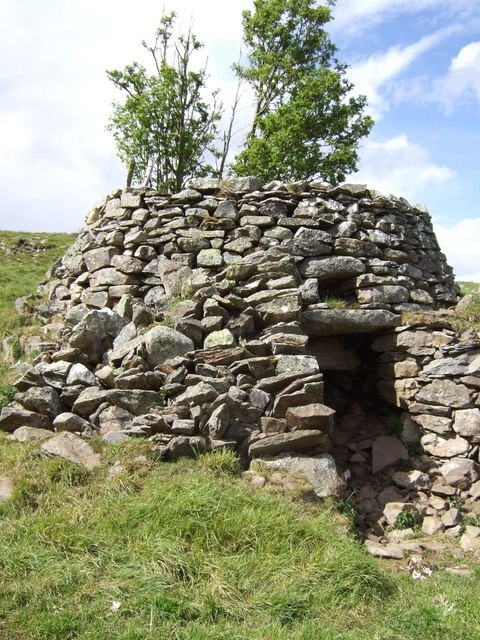
An old lime kiln at Badenyon

Badenyon (from Scottish Gaelic: Bad an Eòin - Knoll of the Birds) is a former clachan, or village, in Aberdeenshire, Scotland. The last farming inhabitant of Badenyon, Jeanie Farquarson, died in the early 1970s. Badenyon is now owned by the Blaxter family and is the host of the great Badenyon Boat Race which has been going for several years.

The site of the 13th-century Badenyon Castle is nearby.
