= James Robson (poet and songwriter) =

English poet & songwriter (??–1757)

James Robson (died c. 6 May 1757) was a Northumbrian landowner, poet, songwriter, "political criminal" and one time Jacobite rebel.

== Early life ==
James Robson was born in Northumberland, probably in, or near, Thropton, a small village near to Rothbury and was described as a “freeholder” (i.e. owner of land), in the village. He became a Jacobite, siding with James Francis Edward Stuart (also called the Old Pretender, son of the deposed James II, and some said rightful heir to the throne of Britain) and took part in the First Jacobite Rising (or Rebellion).

During this uprising, General Carpenter, after marching his men and horses into Scotland, returned to Newcastle tired and weary, but was immediately ordered to meet the Jacobite "rebels" at Lancaster. He met the rebels at Preston, where the rebels, after defending the place for some time, surrendered to the King's troops. Among the rebels was Mr James Robson of Throston, who was imprisoned in Preston Jail.

He was a poet, songwriter, but whether this was by natural bent, or because of his incarceration, is not clear. It appears that he may have been a musician, as many of the historical documents describe him as "a (or "the") leader of a (or "the") band in the Pretender’s army", and although these does not make clear whether this means a "group of musicians" or just a "group of rebels", John Bell in his Rhymes of Northern Bards, states that "James Robson ….. was at that time a musician in the rebel army".

== Marriage ==
According to "Archaeologia Aeliana" he married Mary, who died in 1723.

== Later life ==
Also according to “Archaeologia Aeliana” James Robson (described as “a Jacobite bandsman”) had eventually been freed. In the Rothbury Parish Records, in the section devoted to Papists and Dissenters, the baptismal records appertaining to Robson, that had been fairly regular, ceased in 1714, but then in 1723, in the burial records, is a “Mary, wife of James Robson, Thropton”, and later on 6 May 1757 is the burial of “James Robson of Thropton”

== Works ==
These include :-

- Satyr Upon Women – described by Bell as “This song is imperfectly compiled from part of a Satire upon Women wrote in Preston prison in 1715, by Mr James Robson, a freeholder in Thropton, near Rothbury, Northumberland, at that time a musician in the rebel army”. (note the archaic phrasing)

The two descriptions of this song in The Local Historian's Table Book and An historical view of the County by Eneas Mackenzie are identical, and read “Mr James Robson, stone-mason of Thropton, was leader of the band in the Pretender’s army in 1715. He wrote a satire on women, and several other poetical pieces, while confined prisoner at Preston in Lancashire. It is said that he sang the satire at an iron-barred window, looking into a garden, where a lady and her maid were walking. When the song was finished, the former observed, "That young man seems very severe upon our sex, but perhaps he is singing more from oppression than pleasure; go give him that half-crown;" which the girl (sic – her maid) handed through the grating at a period when the captive poet was on the point of starving".

- “A Song – composed by Mr James Wilson, of Cawsey Park, on Mr Coughron and family leaving Hebron Hill”. This Mr Coughron was the brother of the celebrated mathematician George Coughron who died of smallpox in Newcastle 7 January 1774 aged 21 (or 23)
- Hobby Elliott – This song is said to have been written by Mr James Robson, Stone Mason, at Thropton, near Rothbury, who was leader of the band in the Pretender's army, in 1715; he wrote a Satyr on women, and several other pieces while confined prisoner at Preston, in Lancashire.

== See also ==
- Geordie dialect words
- John Bell
- Rhymes of Northern Bards
