= The Water of Tyne =

Folk song

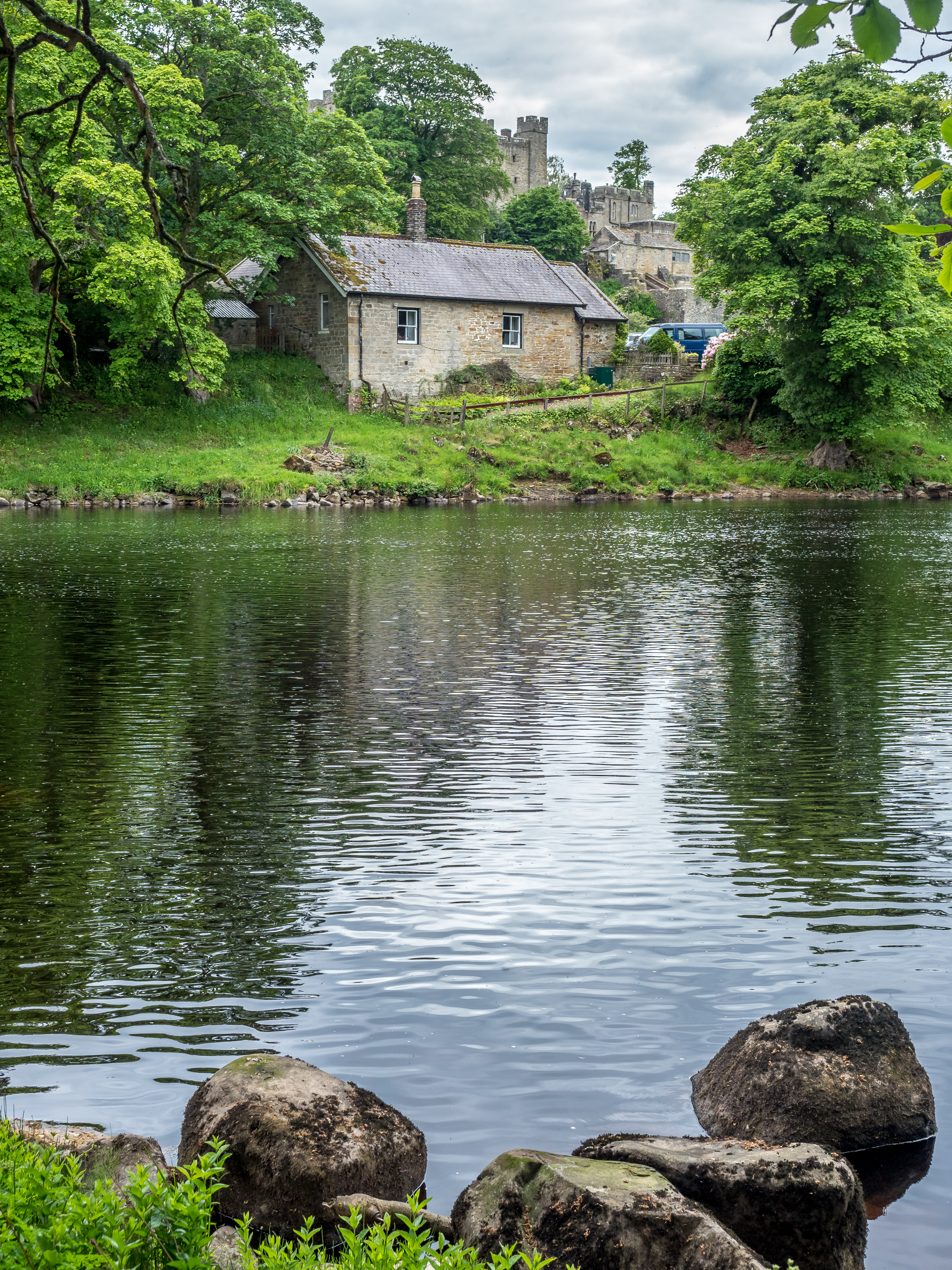
Haughton Castle, a possible setting for the ferry in the song

The Water of Tyne (sometimes rendered as The Waters of Tyne) is a folk song (Roud number 1364) from the north-east of England. The song is sung by a girl or woman lamenting the fact that her paramour is on the opposite bank of the River Tyne. Sleeve notes to Michael Hunt's recording of Tyneside songs states that "the ferry is believed to be that at Haughton Castle on the North Tyne". Alternatively the "rough river" in the last line may indicate a point further downstream, possibly Tynemouth.

The song was collected by John Bell in 1810 and published two years later in Rhymes of Northern Bards.

The song can easily be gender-swapped by changing the two "him"s (in verse 1, line 2 and verse 3, line 4) to "her"s.

== Lyrics ==
I cannot get to my love, if I would dee, (Note: "for the life of me")
The water of Tyne runs between him and me;
And here I must stand with a tear in my e'e, (Note: eye)
Both sighing and longing my sweetheart to see.

O where is the boatman? my bonny hinny! (Note: "my good friend")
O where is the boatman? bring him to me,—
To ferry me over the Tyne to my honey,
And I will remember the boatman and thee.

O bring me a boatman, I'll give any money,
And you for your trouble rewarded shall be,—
To ferry me over the Tyne to my honey,
Or scull him across that rough river to me.

== Melody ==
Tune: "The meeting of the waters".
