= Cecil Pitt =

Cecil Pitt was a Tyneside songwriter, who lived in the early nineteenth century

== Brief details ==
Cecil Pitt (lived ca. 1812) was a Tyneside songwriter, who, according to the information given by John Bell in his Rhymes of Northern Bards published in 1812, has the song "The Newcastle Signs" attributed to his name.

The song is not written in Geordie dialect but is definitely local to Newcastle. It was sung at Newcastle Theatre Royal by Mr Scrifen on 4 June 1806.

The same song with the same comments appears on page 89 of "The Tyne Songster" published by W & T Fordyce in 1840 and in "Marshall's Collection of Songs" published by John Marshall in 1827.

Nothing more appears to be known of this person, or their life

== See also ==
Geordie dialect words
(Geordie) Rhymes of Northern Bards by John Bell Junior
The Tyne Songster (W & T Fordyce, 1840)
Marshall's Collection of Songs, Comic, Satirical 1827
