= Willie Armstrong =

English songwriter and performer

William Armstrong (1804 – ) was an English concert hall songwriter and performer from Newcastle upon Tyne. His most famous song is probably The Newcassel Worthies.

== Biography ==
William Armstrong was born around 1804 in Painter Heugh in Newcastle. His father was a shoemaker owning a business in Dean Street.

William himself was apprenticed to a Mr Wardle, a painter of White Cross (the site of a previous market cross dating from 400–500 years previous) in Newgate Street. After his apprenticeship he worked as a journeyman. (It is not known whether he actual achieved the degree of "master" in his trade).

He was admired as the singer "Willie Armstrong" as well as being appreciated as a songwriter, and was known as a performer who enjoyed singing his own songs.

He moved to London around 1833-34 after which, very little is known of him or his life.

== Works ==
Many of his songs were of the times, of the Colliers and the Keelboatmen, or humorous occurrences.

Taken as a whole, the collection of songs become a social history of the times as well as a feast of dialect materials

Some of the publications containing his works are :--

- His earliest known song "The Jenny Howlet (or Lizzie Mudie's Ghost)" was first published in one of John Marshall's Chap-Books in 1823
- A Collection of Songs, Comic, Satirical, and Descriptive, chiefly in the Newcastle Dialect, and illustrative of the language and manners of the common people on the Banks of the Tyne and neighbourhood. By T. Thompson, J. Shields, W. Mitford, H Robson, and others. Newcastle upon Tyne: Printed by John Marshall in the Old Flesh-Market. 1827
- The Tyne Songster, Fordyce's 1842 Newcastle Song Book, produced by W & T Fordyce in 1840 included more of his works.
- Songs of the Tyne; being a collection of popular local songs. No.4 including Newcastle Worthies by William Armstrong - published by J. Ross, Royal Arcade, Newcastle upon Tyne c1846

The following is a list of some of his songs:

- Invitation to the Mansion-house Dinner in honour of the Coronation
- Keelmen and the Grindstone
- The Jenny Howlet or Lizzie Mudie's Ghost
- Newcastle Worthies
- The Golden Horns, or the General invitation

== See also ==
- Geordie dialect words
- John Ross
- The Songs of the Tyne by Ross
- W & T Fordyce
- The Tyne Songster
- John Marshall
- Marshall's Collection of Songs, Comic, Satirical 1827
