= George Angus (printer) =

English business biography

- Born: Newcastle upon Tyne, England
- Occupations: Printer, publisher
- Years active: early 19th century
- Known for: Operating the Angus family printing business in Newcastle; publishing chapbooks and song collections

Thomas, his wife Margaret, their eldest son Thomas (Junior) and second son, George Angus were members of a Tyneside family who ran a printing and publishing business between 1774 and 1825, very important at the time for the Chapbook business.

== Business ==
The "Angus Family" printing business was established by Thomas Angus in 1774 and swiftly rose to prominence as one of the foremost printers of Chapbooks. Notably, Thomas Bewick, a young apprentice, was employed by Angus from 1774 to 1776. The company operated from premises located in The Side, Newcastle.

Following Thomas (senior)'s passing in 1784, his widow Margaret assumed control of the business operations. By 1800, the enterprise underwent a name change to M. Angus & Son, with Thomas (Junior) joining as a partner until his death in 1808.

At this stage the second son George became the junior partner.

Margaret retired in December 1812 and George continued to run the business, changing the name again to G Angus, until his bankruptcy in 1825, when all his stock was auctioned.

Henry Robson and Robert Emery were at one time apprenticed to the Angus family business.

== Works ==
These include :-
Thomas (senior) - who printed :

- Numerous street literature and Chapbooks
- the rules of The Philosophical Society of 1775

Margaret - who published :

- Specimens of Wood Engraving by Thomas and John Bewick” (Hugo, 4097) in 1798
- John Bell’s Rhymes of Northern Bards
- Newcastle Garland c1805

George - who published :

- A Collection of New Song, published c1810 (which included “The Weymouth Frigate”, “William at Eve or William at Eve's Garland”, “Say, Bonny Lass”, “Rat tat too”, “Still from Care and thinking free,” and “Loose every Sail to the Breeze”.

== See also ==
- Geordie dialect words
- Allan's Illustrated Edition of Tyneside Songs and Readings
- Rhymes of Northern Bards
