= T. Moor (songwriter) =

Tyneside singer/songwriter of the 19th century

T. Moor was a Tyneside singer/songwriter of the 19th century. The only song attributed to his name is "The Skipper's Dream".

== Life ==
Even less is known about Moor than many of his counterparts, the only information available coming from a brief item in Allan’s Tyneside Songs

Mr Moor, not even his Christian name is known, was a shoemaker who had a business in Denton Chare, Newcastle. He was a good bass singer and sang in the choir of St. Andrew's Church, Newcastle upon Tyne.
Moor was the writer of "The Skipper's Dream", an anti-papal song, written in a Geordie dialect, which tells of the dream of a local skipper, with caustic comments about the forgiving of sins for money. This is the only song attributed to our Mr Moor, who would often sing the song.

== Collections ==
The song first appeared in The Newcastle Songster, a chapbook published by J. Marshall, Old Flesh Market, Newcastle upon Tyne c1824.
The song appears later in the Tyne Songster, a choice selection of songs in the Newcastle dialect – a 72-page booklet printed and sold by W. Orange, North Shields in 1827. (No author's name given in this edition). In the later (1840) edition printed and sold by W & T Fordyce of Newcastle, T. Moor is given as the writer.

== See also ==
Geordie dialect words
