= William Cleghorn =

British philosopher

- Born: 1718 (baptism 8 May 1719); Edinburgh, Scotland
- Died: 1754

Philosophical work
- Era: 18th-century philosophy
- Region: Western Philosophy
- School: Empiricism, Scottish Enlightenment
- Main interests: Political philosophy, Moral philosophy

William Cleghorn (1718 – August 1754) was a British philosopher. He was born to a successful Scottish brewer, Hugh Cleghorn, and Jean Hamilton, and died in 1754, aged 36. William Cleghorn held the Chair of Pneumatics and Moral Philosophy at the University of Edinburgh from 1745 until his death in 1754. Four volumes of notes on Cleghorn's lectures on moral philosophy from 1746 to 1747 are stored at the University of Edinburgh library.

== Cleghorn: David Hume's rival ==
Cleghorn is primarily remembered for being a rival of the more famous philosopher David Hume. In 1744 and 1745, Hume and Cleghorn were competing candidates for the position of Chair of Pneumatics and Moral Philosophy at the University of Edinburgh. Hume was arguably the better of the two candidates. However, the town council appointed Cleghorn to the position on 5 June 1745. Hume was an atheist, and it is known that many of the ministers of Edinburgh opposed his appointment to the chair's position, and petitioned the town council, describing Hume as amoral, an atheist, and a sceptic. It has been suggested that a clique of people who disliked Hume's personal beliefs arranged for Cleghorn to be given the chair's position at the university. However, some historians believe that Cleghorn was appointed to the position, not because of rivalry based on personal beliefs, but rather because of rivalry between two competing schools of thought on moral philosophy.

== Cleghorn and Adam Ferguson ==
Cleghorn was a friend, and probably also teacher, of Adam Ferguson. It is thought that one of the characters in Ferguson's philosophical work Dialogue on a Highland Jaunt is based on Cleghorn. It has also been claimed that Cleghorn recommended, shortly before his death, that Ferguson be given the Chair of Pneumatics and Moral Philosophy once he had died. Ferguson was not given the chair at this time, although he was given it later.

== Bibliography ==
- Cleghorn, William. 1746–1747. 'Lectures of Professor William Cleghorn' reference Dc.3.3-6. University of Edinburgh Library, Heritage Collections.
- Frasca-Spada, Marina. 2001. 'The Many Lives of Eighteenth-Century Philosophy'. British Journal for the History of Philosophy, Vol. 9, No. 1: 135–44.
- Grote, Simon. 2005. 'The Moral Philosophy of William Cleghorn'. MPhil Dissertation. Faculty of History, Cambridge University.
- Mossner, Ernest Campbell. 1963. 'Adam Ferguson's "Dialogue on a Highland Jaunt" with Robert Adam, William Cleghorn, David Hume, and William Wilkie'. In Carroll Camden (ed.), Restoration and Eighteenth-Century Literature. Chicago: University of Chicago Press: 297–308.
- Mossner, Ernest Campbell. 2001. (2nd Ed.). The Life of David Hume. Oxford University Press.
- Nobbs, Douglas. 1965. 'The Political Ideas of William Cleghorn, Hume's Academic Rival'. Journal of the History of Ideas, Vol. 26, No. 4: 575–86.
