= John Higgins (Newcastle town crier) =

Newcastle Town crier

John Higgins was a town crier in Newcastle upon Tyne in the 19th century.

== His life ==
John Higgins was the Newcastle town crier, known locally as a bellman, in the mid to late 19th century. The official job involved "broadcasting" any official messages, for which he was paid by the local council. In addition to this he would also carry out unofficial/private briefs, usually concerning lost/missing or straying persons, children or animals and lost or stolen property. For these he charged the sum of one shilling, payable in advance. His job depended upon him having a good loud voice and a good memory. He also ran an extensive business as a house-agent in his spare time.

Before he got the job of town crier, his life had been varied, having sold sweets (candy), clothes pegs, toys, lambs, had been a knife and scissors sharpener, cleared snow, collected for lotteries, and anything else which came his way, and from which he could make a profit. It is known that has held the position from the late 1850s until well into the 1870s but the exact duration is uncertain.

The locals used to make fun of his loud voice, but fortunately he had a good sense of humour. He cut a fine figure in his top hat, tail coat and cane, as he walked the streets and exuded an air of distinction. He was well liked and much respected by the local inhabitants.

His bell is now preserved in Newcastle’s Laing Art Gallery.

One of his successors as town crier was Jacky Brown of "Blaydon Races" fame, appearing in the song as “Jackie Broon”.

== Johnny Luik-up ==
Higgins' aura led to his being the subject of a caricature in the song "Johnny Luik-up" by George Ridley. Ridley dressed up as, and took on the character role of, "Johnny Luik-up".

The song, the character, and the act were a great hit. A short bio appears on page 458 of Thomas Allan's Illustrated Edition of Tyneside Songs and Readings.

== See also ==
- Geordie dialect words
- George "Geordie" Ridley
