= Rowland Harrison =

English poet and singer-songwriter (1841–1897)

Rowland "Rowley" Harrison (1841–1897) was a Tyneside poet and singer/songwriter, from Gateshead in North East England. Possibly his best known work is "Geordy (or Geordie) Black", an example of Geordie dialect.

== Early life ==
Rowland Harrison was born 23 June 1841 in King William Street, Gateshead and baptised at St Mary's Church, Gateshead (according to inscriptions in his family bible).

Little is known of his early life, but he started singing in 1864 at age 23 and performed in most of the local concert and music halls including The Victoria Music Hall, Oxford Music Hall, The Empire, The People's Palace, all of Newcastle upon Tyne, The Wear Music Hall, Sunderland, The Alhambra South Shields, Stockton-on-Tees, Darlington, and many other places even as far away as Glasgow.

== Later life ==
For many of his songs he wrote both the words and music, unlike many other writers of the time who only wrote new lyrics to old tunes.

He was known as "Rowley" and his best-known character was "Geordie Black". He used to dress up as this character for his stage act. He wrote a song about (and a public house was named after) the character.

His other jobs were as landlord of the Geordy Black in Gateshead and the Commercial Hotel at Winlaton (it was here that he looked after Joe Wilson for a short while) and manager of his own concert halls. One of his innovations was to erect a large marquee, which according to the local stories was "devoted to singing and Entertainments" and where he and others would perform, singing and generally entertaining the crowds at the Newcastle Town Moor Temperance Festival.

Rowland Harrison moved to Sunderland when he was appointed as manager of the Empire theatre. He died there on 9 June 1897 and was buried at Monkwearmouth Cemetery.

== Works ==
His works include:

Aud wife that had a bit munny! An' the son that wanted it (The)
Aw laff her bad temper away
Barber's shop
Bathin' lass o' Tinmuth (The)
Bob Chambers (Robert Chambers was a Tyne oarsman who won the national sculling championship in 1859) – written c. 1861
Bonniest lass I’ Sheels (The) – This song refers to North Shields and has a large amount of spoken content. It is often alternatively named "The lass I met at Shields".
Chep on strike (The)
Coal cartman (The)
Deeth of Renforth
Drum Major (The)
Geordy Black
Geordy's deeth
Gipsy Jack
Gyetshead publican (or, aw'm always i' the bar)
Gyetshead swell (The) - about a toff, parading around Gateshead in his finest
I'm going down the hill - the alternative name for "Geordy Black" used in Allan's Illustrated Edition of Tyneside Songs and Readings by Thomas Allan
Jack Simpson's bairn
Johnny wi' the gaunsey on
Kyuk shop on the Kee (The) (or, the chep that stole the spyuns)
Lad at the slottin' machine
Lad on strike that wes gan te be married (The)
Lass that work'd at Neville's Glass Hoose (The)
Millisha lad i' trubbel (The)
Nowt like a hoose o' yer awn
Pidjon Dan
Police's band (The)
Pride of the haven, Ned Fry (The)
Ratcatcher (The)
Sawdust Jack
Somebody's stole me bottle
Stivinson's Band trip te Wimbleton. December 1864
Three-happens for a shave, an' thrippence for a crop (The)
Two married men (The)
Widow Broon's lament
Ye think yor clivvor, but yor not

A small book of over 50 pages and sized about 5" x 7½" (125mm x 190mm) entitled Rowland Harrison’s Tyneside Songs, containing local songs composed by Harrison (and with an illustrative sketch of "Geordy Black", was published around 1871. It includes most of the above songs.

== See also ==
- Geordie dialect words
