= The Amphitrite =

Song

"The Amphitrite – (or sometimes called “The Skippers Erudition)"

Song
- Language: English (Geordie)
- Written: c 1824
- Published: 1824
- Songwriter(s): Robert Gilchrist

"The Amphitrite" (or sometimes called “The Skippers Erudition" to distinguish it from other poems of the same or similar names) is a Geordie folk song written in the 19th century by Robert Gilchrist, in a style deriving from music hall. This song tells the tale of a coal keel (or keel boat)

== Lyrics ==
The Amphitrite was the name of a Tyne coal carrying keelboat. The song, written by Robert Gilchrist tells of the ship and its crew.

The comments made in the 1891 edition of Allan’s Tyneside Songs (marked July 30, 1829 E G), is “The following production records some of the ludicrous mistakes made by the intrepid navigators of the coal keels. They are a healthy race of men, and for strength and activity have long been justly famous. Intelligence is making rapid advances amongst them.”
Very few of the versions show any chorus; those which do give it as a plain Fal-de-ral.....

THE AMPHITRITE
also called “The Skippers Erudition”
Tune "Gee-ho! Dobbin

Verse 1
Frae Team gut to Whitley, wi' coals black an' brown,
For the Amphitrite loaded, the keel had come down --
But the bullies ower neet had their gobs se oft wet.
That the nyem o' the ship yen an' a' did forget.

Verse 2
To find out the nyem, now each worried his chops,
An' claw'd at his hips fit to murder the lops --
When the skipper, whee hungry was always most bright,
Swore the pawhogger luggish was called Empty Kite.

Verse 3
Frae the Point round the Girt, a' the time sailin' slow,
Each bullie kept bawlin', "The Empty Kite, ho!"
But their blairin' was vain, for née Empty Kite there,
Though they blair'd till their kites were byeth empty and sair.

Verse 4
A' slaverin', the skipper ca'd Geordie an' Jem,
For to gan to Newcassel and ax the reet nyem --
The youngest he thought myest to blame in this bore,
So P. D. an' his marrow were e'en pawk'd ashore.

Verse 5
Up Shields Road as they trudg'd I' their myest-worn-out soles,
Oft cursin' the Empty Kite, skipper, an' coals --
At the sign o' the Coach they byeth ca'd, it befell,
To mourn their hard case, an' to swattle some yell.

Verse 6
Here a buck at a sirloin hard eatin' was seen,
Which, he said, wi' the air myed his appetite keen;
"Appetite!" cried the bullies—like maislins they star'd,
Wide gyepin' wi' wonder, till "Crikes!" Jemmy blair'd.

Verse 7
"The Appetite, Geordie! smash, dis thou hear that?
The varry outlandish, cull nyem we forgat.
Bliss the Dandy, for had he not tell'd uz the nyem,
To Newcassel we'd wander'd byeth weary and lyem!"

Verse 8
To Shields back they canter'd, an' seun frae the keel,
Rair'd "The Appetite, ho!" 'neuf to frighten the de'il --
Thus they fund out the ship—cast their coals in a sweat --
Still praisin' the Dandy that day they had met.

Verse 9
Then into the huddock weel tir'd they all gat,
An' of Empty Kite, Appetite, lang they did chat,
When the skipper discover'd -- (mair wise than a king)
Though not the syem word, they were much the syem thing.

== Comments on variations to the above version ==
NOTE –
In the early 19th century, as today, there were cheap books and magazines.
Many of these “chapbooks” were on poor quality paper to a poor standard and with poor quality print. The works were copied with no thoughts of copyright, and the work required very little proof-reading, and what was done was not required to a high standard. Consequently the dialect words of songs varied between editions.
As this was a very popular song, it appeared in numerous editions. The many versions published show considerable, some very minor, variations, mainly in the spelling of the words, and sometimes variations within the same edition. Some of the most common are listed below :-

Generally
a' and all
a'ways and always
broon and brown
bullie and bully
ca'd and called
discover'd and discovered
Geordie and Geordy
hunger, hunger'd and hungry
in and iv
Jem and Jim
most, meyst and myest
noo and now
o' and of
oot and out
P. D. and Pee-Dee
Pack'd and pawk'd
rair'd and roar'd
sae and so
sweat and swet
tell'd and tell't
thou and tu
trodg'd and trudg'd
up Shields Road and up the Shields Road
us and uz
was and were
went, whe' and whee

Specific differences
Verse 1 Line 3 varies between "thropples see wet" and "gobs se oft wet"
Verse 2 Line 3 starts either "Then" or "When"
Verse 5 Line 4 "owre a tankard o' yell" and "an' to swattle some yell"
Verse 6 Line 2 starts eithe 'An, And, or Which
Verse 7 Line 2 sometime starts with an additional "It's"
Verse 8 Line 4 either the Dandy "they'd luckily met" or "that day they had met"
Verse 9 Line 2 "they did" and "did they"
Verse 9 Line 3 "discover'd" and "fund oot" – also later in the line "(wise as Solomon, King)" and "(mair wise than a king)"
Verse 9 Line 4 "'twas aboot the syem thing" and "they were much the syem thing"

== Recordings ==
To follow

== See also ==
Geordie dialect words
