= The Skipper's Dream =

Song performed by T. Moor

"The Skipper’s Dream"

Song by T Moor
- Language: English (Geordie)
- Written: c1824
- Published: 1824
- Lyricist: T Moor

"The Skipper’s Dream" is a Geordie folk song written in the 19th century by T. Moor, in a style deriving from music hall.

Even less is known about Moor than many of his counterparts. The only information available coming from a brief item in "Allan’s Tyneside Songs".
Mr Moor, not even his Christian name is known, was a shoemaker who had a business in Denton Chare, Newcastle upon Tyne.

== Lyrics ==
T. Moor was a Tyneside singer/songwriter. The only song attributed to his name is "The Skipper’s Dream".
The Industrial Revolution in Great Britain in the early nineteenth century caused a shortage of labour, which in turn led to an influx of Irish families into England. This caused a certain amount of resentment, particularly in many places due to the families being of Roman Catholic religion. When this was coupled with the threat of invasion by Napoleon and the Roman Catholic French, it caused even more concern and led to a sudden and alarming increase in the number of Orange Lodges. This forced the government to legislate against the Order in 1825.
The song is evidence of the Anti-Papish paranoia felt at the time on Tyneside where Orange lodges were particularly prevalent.
In this song, a Tyneside skipper, having fallen into a drunken sleep, is tempted to 'turn Papist', with caustic comments about the forgiving of sins for money.

T'other day, ye mun knaw, wey aw'd had a sup beer;
It ran i' maw heed, and myed me sae queer,
That aw lay doon to sleep i' wor huddock sae snug,
An' dreem'd sic a dreem as gar'd me scart me lug.

Aw dreem'd that the queerest man iver aw see'd,
Cam stumping alang wi' three hats on his heed;
A goon on like a preest, (mind aw's telling ne lees)
An' at his side there was hingin a greet bunch o' kees.

He stares i' maw fyece, and says, "How d'ye de ?"
"Aw's teufish", says aw, "canny man, how are ye ?"
Then he says, wiv a voice gar'd me trimmle, aw's shure,
"Aw's varry weel, thank ye, but yor day is nigh ower."

Aw studies awhile, then says aw, "Are ye Deeth,
Come here for to wise oot a poor fellow's breeth ?"
He says, "No, aw'm the Pope, cum to try if aw can,
Save a vile wretch like ye, fra the nasty Bad Man."

He said, yen St. Peter gov him them greet kees,
To let into Hiven wheiver he'd please;
An' if aw'd turn Papish, and giv him a Note,
He'd send me to Hiven, without ony doot.

Then a yel heep o' stuff he talk'd aboot sin,
An' sed he'd forgi' me whativer aw'd deun;
An' if that aw'd murder'd byeth fayther and muther,
For a five shillin peece, wey, aw might kill me bruther.

Says aw, "Mister Pope, gi's ne mair o' yur tauk,
But oot o' wor huddock aw's beg ye to wauk;
An' if ye divent get oot before aw coont Nine,
Byeth ye and yor kees, man, aw'll fling i' the Tyne."

So aw on tiv me feet wiv a bit iv a skip,
For aw ment for to give him an Orangeman's grip;
But aw waken'd just then in a terrible stew,
An' fand it a dream as aw've teld ye just noo.

— The Skipper's Dream

== Comments on variations to the above version ==
NOTE – In the early 19th century, as today, there were cheap books and magazines.
Many of these "chapbooks" were on poor-quality paper to a poor standard and with poor-quality print. The works were copied with no thoughts of copyright, and the work required very little proofreading, and what was done was not required to a high standard. Consequently, the dialect words of songs varied between editions.
This particular song shows several variations between the various published versions, some very minor, mainly in the spelling of the words, and sometimes variations within the same edition. Some of the most common are listed below :

- aboot and about
- coont and count
- great and greet
- hanging and hinging
- heep and hep
- kees and keys
- noo and now
- peece and piece
- preest and priest
- te and to
- teld and told
- waken'd and wakened

== See also ==
- Geordie dialect words
