= Geordy Black =

Song performed by Rowland Harrison

Song by Rowland “Rowley” Harrison
- Language: English (Geordie)
- Written: 1800s
- Composer: Unknown
- Lyricist: Rowland “Rowley” Harrison

"Geordy Black", also known as "Geordie Black" and "I'm Going Down the Hill", is a 19th-century Geordie folk song by Rowland "Rowley" Harrison, in a style deriving from music hall.

The song tells the tale of an old miner, reminiscing on his experiences. Harrison would routinely dress as Geordie Black when performing the song on stage.

== Lyrics ==
Maw nyem is Geordy Black, aw'm gettin' varry awd,

Aa've hewed tons o' coals i' maw time;

An' when aw wes yung, aw cud either put or hew,

Oot o' uther lads aw always tyuk the shine.

Aw'm gannin' doon the hill, aw cannet use the pick,

The maister hes pity on aud bones;

Aw'm noo on the bank; aw pass maw time away

Amang the bits o' lads wi' pickin' oot the stones.

Chorus

Maw nyem is Geordy Black,

In maw time aw've been a crack,

Aw've worked byeth i' the Gyuss an' i' the Betty,

An' the coals upon the Tyne oot o' uthers tyek the shine,

An' we lick them a' for iron doon at Hawks's.

When aw was a bairn, carried on my fethur's back,

He wad tyek me away te the pit;

An' gettin' T the cage, an' gannin' doon belaw,

Twas eneuf te myek a yungster tyek a fit.

Te sit an' keep a door, 'midst darkness an' gloom,

Ay, monny an 'oor be me-sel;

An' hear the awful shots that rummel'd throo the pit,

An' lumps o' roondy coal cum doon pell-mell.

Chorus

Aa'll bid ye a' gud neet, it's nearly time te lowse;

Aw shure aw've tried te please ye ivery one,

Yung lads that's here the neet, mind de the thing that's reet,

In this world that's the way te get on.

But here's success to trade, byeth on the Wear an' Tees!

Aw dinnet like te see places slack;

For if wor pit lies idle, ne coal cums te day,

It greeves the heart o' poor Geordy Black.

== Variant versions ==
As this was a very popular song, it appeared in numerous editions. The many versions published show considerable variations in the spelling of the words, including:

aa, aw and I
aad and awd
aad, aud and old
aaful and awful
aa'm and aw'm
a'and aal
always and aalways
bairn and just a lad
baith and byeth
coal and coals
come and cum
dinnet and divent>
'em and them
eneuf and enough
father and fethur>
Geordie Black and Geordy Black
good and gud
greeves and grieves
i' and in
just a lad and yung
ma, maw, me and my
monny and mony
name and nyem
o' and of
others and uther lads
pass and while
roond the pit and throo the pit
rummel'd and rummelled
tak, yyek and tyuk
varry and very
warked and worked
warld and world
youngster and yungster

Specific differences

Verse 3, line 1 - "Aa'll bid ye a' gud neet" is replaced "Noo aa'll say good neet"
Verse 3, line 1 - "Aw shure aw've tried te please" is replaced by "An' aa've done me best te please"
Verse 3, line 6 - "te see places slack" changed to "te see the place se slack"
Verse 3, line 7 - "ne coal cums te day" changed to "ne pay-note comes teneet"

== Publication ==
A small book of over 50 pages and sized about 5” x 7½” (125mm x 190mm) entitled Rowland Harrison’s Tyneside Songs containing local songs composed by Harrison (and with an illustrative sketch of "Geordy Black", was published around 1871. It includes "Geordie Black" and many other songs.

In modern times, the song also appears on the compact disc The Bonnie Gateshead Lass - Gateshead Songs by various artists on MWM Records (reference MWMCDSP43).

== See also ==
- Geordie dialect words
