= James Cosgrove (comedian) =

Concert hall singer and comedian

James Cosgrove (d. 26 August 1943) was an English humourist and concert hall singer whose career spanned the 19th and 20th centuries.

== Career ==
Born in Byker, he used the pseudonym "J C Scatter". He is credited with making the first recording of the "Blaydon Races" in 1908 and in doing so brought the song back from obscurity to become one of the main Tyneside anthems, although using a slightly different melody. James Cosgrove performed on stage all over the country and continued to do so until the 1940s. He would arrive on stage through the curtains, dressed as his female fruit seller, and juggled with oranges while singing his "Orange Lass". He was one of the greats, and left a legacy of Geordie humour and dialect.

== Works ==
His songs include (together with known recording dates):

- "Blaydon Races" – (recorded 1909)
- "Blaydon Races" – (recorded 1929)
- "The Tyneside Policeman"
- "Wor Nanny's a mazer"
- "Orange Lass" – (recorded 1929)

== Legacy ==
James Cosgrove as J C Scatter made several recordings, some towards the end of his career. His 1909 recording of "Blaydon Races" also survives, but the quality has deteriorated. Several of these survived and two of these songs are available on the CD "Various Artists - Wor Nanny's A Mazer: Early Recordings Of Artists From The North East 1904-1933" (on Phonograph, PHCD2K1)

The full list of tracks on this CD are as follows :

| order | title | artist |
|---|---|---|
| 1 | Wor Nanny's a mazer | C. Ernest Catcheside Warrington |
| 2 | Blaydon Races | J.C. Scatter |
| 3 | Alpine Echoes | Harton Colliery Band |
| 4 | Geordie Haad The Bairn | Jamieson Dodds |
| 5 | Cushy Butterfield | C. Ernest Catcheside Warrington |
| 6 | Hi, canny man | Harry Nelson |
| 7 | The Neibors Doon Belaa | Jamieson Dodds |
| 8 | Tyneside Policeman | J.C. Scatter |
| 9 | The Cliffs Of Old Tynemouth | C. Ernest Catcheside Warrington |
| 10 | Our Jemmie (with patter) | Harry Nelson |
| 11 | Johnson and High Level Hornpipe | Jas. Brown |
| 12 | Keep Your Feet Still Geordie Hinny | Dewey Gibson |
| 13 | Last Night | C. Ernest Catcheside Warrington |
| 14 | Adam Buckam O!, Wrap Up | Ernest J. Potts |
| 15 | Whistling Geordie | Jimmy James |
| 16 | The Keel Row | Anthony Charlton |
| 17 | Hexham Races (Northumbrian Smallpipes) | Felton Lonnin |
| 18 | Albert Before The Means Test Committee Parts 1 & 2 | Albert Burdon & Company |

== See also ==
- Geordie dialect words
