= The Pitman's Revenge =

Song performed by George Cameron

Song by George Cameron
- Language: English (Geordie)
- Written: c1804
- Published: Allan
- Lyricist: George Cameron

The Pitman's Revenge (against Bonaparte) is a traditional Geordie folk song, written circa 1804, by George Cameron in the Geordie dialect. The song is about the threat of invasion posed by Napoleon Bonaparte.

== History ==
Around this period, Napoleon had gathered his armies and was threatening Britain. All over the country volunteer regiments (a sort of Home Guard) were being recruited. George Cameron served as a Sergeant in one such regiment formed to defend Newcastle upon Tyne. He wrote this, his first (and it appears his only) song "The Pitman's Revenge against Bonaparte" during this period, c1804. He first performed the song at a meeting of his regiment, and despite being met with much approval this appears to have been the only song he wrote. According to the 1872 edition of "Allan's Illustrated Edition of Tyneside songs", Cameron's daughter reported that the writer first performed the song at a meeting of his regiment at the Three Indian Kings on Newcastle's Quayside, and that the song was later borrowed by a friend, who, unbeknown to the writer, arranged for it to be published.

== Variations to the lyrics ==
In the early 19th century there were many cheap books and magazines. These books were on poor quality paper with poor quality print. The works were copied with no thought of copyright, very little proof-reading, and what was done was often not to a high standard. Consequently, the dialect words varied between editions. As this was a very popular song, it appeared in numerous editions. The many versions published show variations, mainly in the spelling of the words, and sometimes there were variations within the same edition.

In 1891 a report from Cameron's grandson showed that on the first printing by Bell, a whole line had been missed and in various other printings the author's name had either been omitted or erroneously given as John Shield. These errors were corrected in 1891, with the missing line being restored after 70 years.

Some specific differences between the original and copies are noted below.

=== Specific differences ===
- Verse 1 Line 8 – originally this line was omitted in the printing
- Verse 1 Line 9 – originally started with "For"
- Verse 4 Line 8 – varies between wad nae heed and waddent heed
- Verse 6 Line 7 – varies from "Aw'd tyek me pick, and hew them doon" or "aw'd hew"

== Lyrics ==
=== The Pitman's Revenge (Against Bonaparte) ===
Verse 1

Ha'e ye heerd o' these wondrous Dons,
That myeks this mighty fuss, man,
About invadin' Britain's land?
I vow they're wondrous spruce, man;
But little de the Frenchmen ken
About wor loyal Englishmen;
Wor Collier lads are for cockades,
They'll fling away their picks an' spades
For guns te shoot the French, man.

Chorus-
Tol lol de rol, de rol de rol.

Verse 2
Then te parade the Pitmen went,
Wi' hearts byeth stout an' strang, man;
Gad smash the French! we are se strang,
We'll shoot them ivry one, man!
Gad smash me sark! if aw wad stick
Te tummel them a' doon the pit;
As fast as aw cud thraw a coal,
Aw'd tummel them a' doon the hole,
An' close her in aboon, man.

Chorus-
Tol lol de rol, de rol de rol.

Verse 3
Heeds up! says one, ye silly sow,
Ye dinna mind the word, man;
Eyes reet! says Tom, an' wi' a dam,
And march off at the word, man;
Did ever mortals see sic brutes,
Te order me to lift maw kutes?
Ad smash the fyul! he stands and talks,
How can he learn me te walk,
That's wark'd this forty year, man!

Chorus-
Tol lol de rol, de rol de rol.

Verse 4
But shud the Frenchmen shew thor fyece,
Upon wor waggon-ways, man,
Then, there upon the road, ye knaw,
We'd myek them end thor days, man;
Ay, Bonaparte's sel aw'd tyek,
An' thraw him i' the burnin' heap,
An' wi' greet speed aw'd roast him deed;
His marrows, then, aw waddent heed,
We'd pick oot a' thor een, man.

Chorus-
Tol lol de rol, de rol de rol.

Verse 5
Says Willy Dunn to loyal Tom,
Yor words are a' a joke, man;
For Geordy winna hae yor help,
Ye're sic kamstarie folk, man;
Then Willy, lad, we'll rest in peace,
In hopes that a' the wars may cease;
But awse gi'e ye, Wull, te understand,
As lang as aw can wield me hand,
Thor's nyen but George shall reign, man.

Chorus-
Tol lol de rol, de rol de rol.

Verse 6
Eneuf of this hes shure been said,
Cried cowardly Willy Dunn, man;
For shud the Frenchmen cum this way,
We'd be ready for te run, man.
Gad smash ye, for a fyul! says Tom,
For if aw cudden't use me gun,
Aw'd tyek me pick and hew them doon,
An' run an' cry, thro' a' the toon,
God save greet George, wor King, man!

Chorus-
Tol lol de rol, de rol de rol.

== See also ==
- Geordie dialect words
