= John Leonard (songwriter) =

John Leonard was a Tyneside radical poet and songwriter of the early 19th century. His only dialect song was "Winlaton Hopping".

== Life ==
It is thought that John Leonard was born in Gateshead, County Durham, but very little is known about him, or his life.
His father, George, was a gardener and was a described as "a man of some means" owning some property in either Jackson’s Chare or more likely Leonard’s Court (both long since demolished), near Gateshead High Street.
John Leonard was apprenticed as a joiner, but the date of birth and date and place of death are unknown.
As there are no records of his burial in the Gateshead (St. Mary’s ) register between 1813 and 1852, it is assumed he died elsewhere.
A note on one of his manuscripts states that it was partly written during a three months' imprisonment. There is no further record of the offence, place or time, but as he was a radical, and was in favour of Irish Nationalism, writing a poem in praise of Charles James Fox and another denouncing William Pitt, it was possible brought about by his actions over this point.

== Works ==
His output was considerable and included were :-

- Winlaton Hopping – the only dialect poem he wrote, the remainder were of a political and general nature – written c 1814 – The Winlaton Hopping is thought to date back to Saxon times. It was on the weekend after 14 May and was an important weekend in the village.
- Derwent Volunteers – A Song written to encourage the men of Derwentside to join the war against Napoleon.
- Lamentation and confession of a crimp - Song about the activities of a press-gang agent.

== Collections ==
A volume of manuscripts of his poetry written c1813 and of between three or four hundred pages, is kept in the Reference Library, Newcastle.
A small collection of his poems of 36 pages was published in 1808 by Marshall’s, of Gateshead.

== See also ==
Geordie dialect words
