= Bob Cranky's Adieu =

English folk song

Song by unknown
- Language: English (Geordie)
- Written: c1850
- Published: c1850
- Songwriters: Composer: Unknown; Lyricist: John "Jack" Shield

Bob Cranky's Adieu (On going with the Volunteer Association from Gateshead to Newcastle, on permanent Duty) is a Geordie folk song written in the 19th century by John "Jack" Shield, in a style deriving from music hall.

== Lyrics ==
The Blue Stone o' the Brig (a dialect word for Bridge) is now only a nominal boundary. It was originally a stone to mark the southern boundary of the town and county of Newcastle. Beyond it was Gateshead, which was include in the ”county and liberty of Durham". It was at this point where the "marching guinea" was paid.
The birthday of King George III fell on Saturday, 4 June, and on 6 and 7 June 1808 it was celebrated in grand style on Tyneside. It was estimated that more than 5,000 men took part, some from regular regiments and many more came from the local militia, some from villages many miles away.
The troops marched through the streets, paraded on The Town Moor, and the following day marched to Throckley Fell.
The Gateshead Volunteers were one of the groups of local militia. They were being placed on three weeks "permanent duty" to guard the town "against an attack from Napoleon and the French“ and had marched into Newcastle on Sunday 5 June.
The song, based on a single incident was very popular at the time. But as history moves on, the incident becomes trivial, and the song becomes one of the many forgotten ones.

The lyrics are as follows:-

BOB CRANKY'S ADIEU

Air unknown
On going with the Volunteer Association from Gateshead to Newcastle, on permanent Duty

Fareweel, fareweel, ma comely pet!

Aw's forc'd three weeks to leave thee;

Aw's doon for parm'ent duty set,

O dinna let it grieve thee!

Ma hinny! wipe them een sae breet,

That mine wi' love did dazzle;

When thy heart's sad, can mine be leet?

Come, ho'way get a jill o' beer,

Thy heart to cheer:

An' when thou sees me mairch away,

Whiles in, whiles out

O' step, nae doot,

"Bob Cranky's gane," thou'lt sobbing say,

"A sowgering to Newcassel!!"

Come, dinna dinna whinge and whipe,

Like yammering Isbel Macky;

Cheer up, ma hinny! leet thy pipe,

And take a blast o' backy!

It's but for yen and twenty days,

The foulks's een aw'l dazzle, --

Prood, swagg'ring i' my fine reed claes:

Ods heft! my pit claes—dist thou hear?

Are waurse o' wear;

Mind cloot them weel, when aw's away;

An' a posie gown

Aw'll buy thee soon,

An' thou's drink thy tea—aye, twice a-day,

When aw come frae Newcassel.

Becrike! aw's up tiv every rig,

Sae dinna doot, ma hinny!

But at the blue stane o' the brig

Aw'll ha'e ma mairchin Ginny.

A ginny! wuks! sae strange a seet,

Ma een wi' joy wad dazzle;

But aw'll hed spent that varra neet --

For money, hinny! owre neet to keep,

Wad brick ma sleep:

Sae, smash! aw think'st a wiser way,

Wi' flesh an' beer

Mysel' to cheer,

The lang three weeks that aw've to stay,

A sowgering at Newcassel!.

But whisht! the sairjeant's tongue aw hear,

"Fa' in! fa' in!" he's yelpin!

The fifes are whuslin' loud an' clear

An' sair the drums they're skelpin.

Fareweel, ma comely! aw mun gang,

The Gen'ral's een to dazzle!

But, hinny! if the time seems lang,

An' thou freets about me neet an' day;

Then come away,

Seek out the yell-house where aw stay,

An' we'll kiss and cuddle;

An' mony a fuddle

Sall drive the langsome hours away,

When sowgering at Newcassel!.

== Comments on variations to the above version ==
NOTE –
In the early 19th century, as today, there were cheap books and magazines.
Many of these “chapbooks" were on poor quality paper to a poor standard and with poor quality print. The works were copied with no thoughts of copyright, and the work required very little proof-reading, and what was done was not required to a high standard. Consequently, the dialect words of songs varied between editions.
As this was a very popular song, it appeared in numerous editions. The many versions published show considerable, some very minor, variations, mainly in the spelling of the words, and sometimes variations within the same edition. Some of the most common are listed below :-

Generally
an, and
aw'l and aw'll
baccy and backy
becrike and belike
binny and hinny
Blue Styen of the Brig to blue stane o' the brig – various changes between these two including use of capital letters
breer and breet
come'ly and comely
een and e'en
every and ivery
farewheel and fare-weel
folks's, foulk's and foulks's
forc'd and fourc'd
gane and gyen
gill and jill
ginny and guinea
goon and gown
ha'e and hev
hoose and house
Is'bel Mackey and Isbel Macky
langsome and lonesome
lood and loud
ma, maw and my
marchin', marchin' and marching
meesl and mysel'
mine and thy
ods and odds
oot and out
sairgent's, sairjeant's and sairjent's
sall and shall
sougerin' soujerin', sowgerin' and sowjerin' (with and without apostrophe or "g" at the end)
swagg'rin' and swagg'ring
take and tyek
thee and thy
think'st and thinks't
thoo and thou
varra, verra and very
wad and will
warse and waurse
whuslin' and wusslin'
yammerin' and yammering

== Recordings ==
To follow

== See also ==
- Geordie dialect words
