= Badenyon Castle =

Coordinates: 57.2571°N 3.0951°W

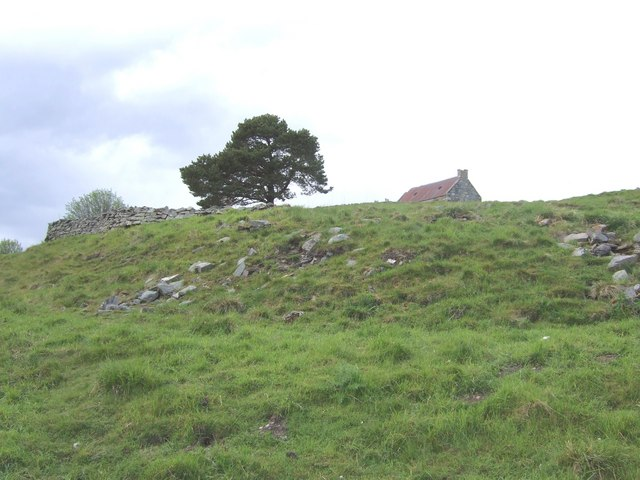
Site of Badenyon Castle

Badenyon Castle was a castle, dating from the 13th century around 7.5 miles (12.1 km) west of Kildrummy, north of Coulins Burn, in Aberdeenshire, Scotland.

== History ==
The castle was the residence of the Clan Gordon of Glenbuchat before the building of Glenbuchat Castle in 1590, although traditionally it was the home of John O'Badenyon in the 13th century.

By 1898, a few pieces of sandstone against the wall of an adjacent cottage, and a recessed door inside were all that remained of the castle.

== Structure ==
The castle was surrounded by a fosse and protected by a tower. A door hinge from the nearby steading is said to come from the castle. The precise site of the property is not entirely clear.
