= George Cameron (songwriter) =

George Cameron (c. 1768 – 20 June 1823) was an English hairdresser and songwriter from Tyneside.

== Early life ==
He was born c. 1768, possibly on Tyneside.

== Career ==
Very little is known of Cameron's life, except that at some stage he worked as a hairdresser, with a business in the Cloth Market, Newcastle upon Tyne.

Around this time period, Napoleon had gathered his armies and was threatening Britain and all over the country volunteer regiments (a sort of Home Guard) were being recruited. Cameron served as a sergeant in one such regiment formed to defend Newcastle upon Tyne.

Cameron wrote his first (and what appears to be his only) song "The Pitman's Revenge (against Bonaparte)" during this period, c. 1804. He first performed the song at a meeting of his regiment at the Three Indian Kings on Newcastle's Quayside, and despite being met with much approval this appears to have been the only song he wrote.

== Death ==
He died, age 55, on 20 June 1823 and is buried in St. Nicholas' Churchyard.

== Notes on the song ==
According to the 1872 edition of Allan's Illustrated Edition of Tyneside Songs and Readings, Cameron's daughter reported that the writer first performed the song at a meeting of his regiment at the Three Indian Kings on Newcastle's Quayside, and that the song was later borrowed by a friend, who, unbeknown to the writer, arranged for it to be published. The story was added to in the 1891 edition when a report from Cameron's grandson showed that on the first printing by Bell, a whole line had been missed and in various other printings the author's name had either been omitted or erroneously given as John Shield. These errors were corrected in the 1891 edition.

== See also ==
- Geordie dialect words
