= Robert Gilchrist (poet) =

English poet, singer/songwriter

- Born: 8 September 1797; Gateshead, County Durham
- Died: 11 July 1844 (aged 46)
- Occupation: poet
- Notable work: "The Amphitrite"
- Spouse: Miss Margaret Bradley Morrison (m. 1823)

Robert Gilchrist (1797–1844) was a Tyneside poet, born in Gateshead in County Durham. Possibly his best-known work is "The Amphitrite" – (or sometimes called "The Skippers Erudition", an example of Geordie dialect).

== Early life and career ==
Robert Gilchrist was born in St. Mary's Parish, Gateshead, 8 September 1797. His father was a sailmaker and part owner of the company Payne & Gilchrist.

Robert was apprenticed to another company of sailmakers, William Spence, and after completing his apprenticeship, joined the family company. From a young age he had shown a great interest in poetry and as he grew up he also started writing songs in the local Geordie dialect.
In 1818, he received a silver medal from his fellow poets and songwriters companions in appreciation of his poetry. In the same year, he took up his musket for the defence of the town. The previous year he had been drawn by ballot for the militia, meaning that he must either serve or find a replacement, and had found such a replacement in a "Matthew Winship, a shoemaker, from High Bridge, who was sworn in in his stead".
It was reported that he had a slight cast in his eye and when telling a humorous story "this eye did half the business".

== Later life ==
He married Miss Margaret Bradley Morrison in 1823 at All Saints' Church, Newcastle upon Tyne.
Upon the death in 1829 of his father, Robert took over the family business, which was near the Custom House on the Quayside. He was not successful in the business, showing more interest in his writing and preferring the country and long walking tours.
By this time Gilchrist was residing in one of the old houses facing Shieldfield Green, a house where King Charles had reputedly been held prisoner during the English Civil War.
In 1838, he wrote of the destruction which threatened this house in his poem "The humble petition of the old house in the Shield Field to Mr John Clayton Esq." The house was spared, but has since been demolished in the 1960s increasing urbanisation of Tyneside. A plaque now stands on Shieldfield Green, commemorating Robert Gilchrist's residence there.
Gilchrist increased his status in the Town by becoming a Freeman, and a member of the committee dealing with the Town Moor and other green spaces. He was later in c1836, after the passing of the "Poor Law Reforms" by Parliament, elected to the Board of Guardians, representing the All Saint's Parish, of the Newcastle upon Tyne Poor Law Union. As a Freeman, Gilchrist took part in the annual Barge Day event, by which the civic dignitaries sailed the length of the Corporation's boundaries on the River Tyne and was foremost in the Freemen's steamboat.

== Works ==
In 1822 Gilchrist's first book, of just 24 pages, entitled "Gothalbert and Hisanna" was published in 1822.
In 1824 his Collection of Original Songs, Local and Sentimental (part 1), was published by Mitchell in a 36-page book. Poems, a book of some 90 pages, appeared in 1826, published by W. Boag. In this, there are no local songs, but many sacred works which show him to favour the philosophy of the Glasites, a form of "primitive Christianity".

Gilchrist also wrote two poems in honour of English heroine Grace Horsley Darling, who saved 13 people from the wreck of the SS Forfarshire. His works were published in Fordyce's 1842 Newcastle Song Book, Joseph Robson's 1849 Songs of the Bards of the Tyne, and Thomas Allan's 1862 Tyneside Songs and Readings.

In (or around) 1846 "The Songs of the Tyne being a collection of Popular Local Songs Number 10" was published by John Ross, Printer and publisher, Royal Aecade, Newcastle, which contained The Amphitrite, Blind Willie Singin', The collier's keek at the Nation and Voyage to Lunnen.

=== Songs ===
- Amphitrite – (The) – also called "The Skippers Erudition"
- Blind Willie's singing.
- Bold Archy drowned (Composed on hearing a false report of the death of that celebrated character) – The character was Archibald Henderson, a famous and well-liked character of Newcastle.
- Collier's keek at the nation (The)
- Lamentation on the death of Captain Starkey (The)
- More innovations (The Bold Dragoon)
- Northumberland Free O' Newcassel (Composed Extempore on the Duke of Northumberland being presented with the freedom of Newcastle)
- Poor Jackey, The Howden Pans Fifer
- Quack Doctors (The)
- Song of improvements (a comment on the original manuscript states "Sung by R. Gilchrist at a dinner in the New Butcher Market, 22 October 1835
- Voyage to Lunnin (A) (Lunnin being London)

=== Poems ===
- Freedom of Election – (The)
- Jesmond Dene
- Lines (Written in a country alehouse)
- Lines on Gibside
- Lines on the death of Rev John Smith, Vicar of Newcastle
- Loss of the Ovington (The) (This poem is respectfully inscribed to Captain Thomas Waters)
- Orphan (The)
- Ravensworth Castle – (On)
- Rose of England – (The)
- St Nicholas Church, Newcastle upon Tyne – (On)
- The approach of Winter – (On)
- The death of ----- – (On)
- The ruins of Benwell – (On)
- To the Tyne
- Vale of Nent – (The)
- Verses on a plant reared by a lady (and which died in consequence of bearing so much blossom)
- Voice was heard from Zion's Hill (A)
- Written at midnight (During a storm)

== Personal life and death ==
Robert Gilchrist died (possibly from a form of stomach cancer) on 11 July 1844 at the Old House in Shieldfield. He was buried = East Ballast Hills burial ground. Robert was outlived by his wife Margaret and five remaining children, some of whom carried on in sailmaking, or other, maritime trades. The family moved in the mid-1850s to London, the reason for the move is unknown, but it was around the time of the Great fire of Newcastle and Gateshead which destroyed a large amount of riverside property.

== See also ==
Geordie dialect words
