= Henry Robson (songwriter) =

British songwriter

Henry Robson (c. 1775 – 1850) was a Tyneside concert hall poet, songwriter and performer in the late 18th and early 19th century. His best known works were perhaps the narrative poem "The Collier's Pay Week", and a poem "The Northern Minstrel's Budget", describing the repertoire of a travelling fiddler and piper.

== Early life ==
Henry Robson was born c. 1770 at Benwell, near Newcastle, Northumberland, and was still residing in Newcastle in 1812 according to John Bell in his notes in "Rhymes of Northern Bards"). He worked as a printer for Mackenzie and Dent (who also printed the works of Bell) and also had his own small business, working at home, where he had a small press.

== Later life ==
Most of Robson's known works had been published by 1824. He died on 21 December 1850 at his home in Grenville Terrace just behind City Road, Newcastle at the age of 75. His Obituary read - "he had worked 60 years as a printer, was the oldest member of the profession in the town, and was much respected by a numerous circle of friends."

== Works ==
These include :-

- Collier's Pay Week (The) - from the collection "The Songs of the Tyne, being a collection of popular local songs. No.8", published by John Ross, Royal Arcade, Newcastle upon Tyne - The song describes life at Benwell in the early 19th century
- Ca' Hawkie through the watter - published c. 1810 - It is a well-known song, and one manuscript dated c 1820, and of a longer than normal version, is written in Robson's handwriting, but this may have been his writing down of the material for safe keeping
- Gateshead Fell
- Northern minstrel's budget - published 1824, in A Collection of Original Local Songs
- Pitman's Pay
- Sandgate Lassie's Lament (The) – to the tune of The Bonny Pit Laddie
- Sandgate wife's nurse song - published c. 1849, a song to be sung to baby while awaiting the return of the keelman husband
- Spring (The) - Written the beginning of May 1809
- Till the tide came in - written c. 1827, published c. 1837-1841, a song about waiting for the tide
- Tyne (The)

The introductory set of "Verses on Northumberland Minstrelsy" in Bell's Rhymes of Northern Bards, are signed H.R., presumably Robson:

'The Northern Minstrel's Budget', consisting mostly of a verse list of more than 200 tunes played by a single piper and fiddler in Northumberland at the beginning of the 19th century, is very useful as a picture of a working musician's repertoire, and also for the detailed forms of many of the titles, much fuller than in other sources.

== See also ==
Geordie dialect words
