= Swalwell Hopping =

English folk song

Song
- Language: English (Geordie)
- Written: c. 1807
- Published: 1840
- Songwriter: John Selkirk

"Swalwell Hopping" is a Geordie folk song written in the 19th century by John Selkirk, in a style deriving from music hall.

This piece tells of the many a funny prank being played by the Crowley's Crew, (workers who appear in other writings of the time), and mentioning (fictitious) characters like Knack-kneed Mat, Slavering Nell, Gyetside Jack, and Willayton Dan. It turns into (almost) a celebration of Crowley's Crew.

== Lyrics ==
The song was later printed in 1840 and later in 1899 in the 198-page book "Songs and Ballads of Northern England" collected and edited by John Stokoe. It was published by W. Scott of Newcastle upon Tyne. The lyrics for "Swalwell Hopping Air – Paddy's Wedding":

Verse 1
LADS! myek a ring
An' hear huz sing
The sport we had at Swalwell, O;
Wor merry play
O' th' Hoppen' Day,
Ho'way, marrows, an' aw'll tell ye, O.
The sun shines warm on Whickham Bank,
Let's aw lye doon at Dolly's O,
An' hear 'boot monny a funny prank
Played by the lads at Crowley's O.

Chorus:
A type of "O' Fal lal the dal la" type chorus

Verse 2
There was Sam, O zoons,
Wiv 'is pantaloons,
An' gravat up ower his gobby, O;
An' Willie, thou
Wi' th' jacket blue,
Thou was the varra Bobby, O.
There was knack-kneed Mat, wiv's purple suit,
An' hopper-hipp'd Dick, aw yellow, O;
Greet Tom was there, wi' Hepple's and coat,
An' buck-sheen'd Bob frae Stella, O.

Verse 3
When we wor drest,
It was confest,
We shem'd the cheps frae Newcassel O;
So away we set
To wor toon gyet,
To jeer them aw as they pass'd us O.
We shouted some we some dung doon
Lobstrop 'lus fellows we kick'd them O;
Some culls went hyem, some crush'd to toon,
Some gat aboot by Whickham, O.

Verse 4
The spree com on
The hat was won
By carrot-pow'd Jenny's Jackey, O.
What a fyece, begok !
Had buckle-mouth'd Jock,
When he twin'd his jaws for the baccy, O.
The kilted lasses fell tid pel-mell,
Wi'—Tally-i-o the Grinder, O;—
The smock was gi'en to slaverin Nell
Ye'd dropp'd had ye been behind her, O.

Verse 5
Wor dance began
Aw'd buck-tyuthed Nan,
An' Geordy thou'd Jen Collin, O;
While the merry black,
Wi' monny a crack,
Set the tamboreen a-rolling, O.
Like wor forge-hammer, we bet se true,
An' shuk Raw's hoose se soundly, O;
Tuff canna cum up wi' Crowley's crew,
Nor thump the tune se roundly, O.

Verse 6
Then Gyetside Jack,
Wiv's bloody back,
Wad dance wi' goggle-ey'd Molly, O;
But up cam Nick,
An' gav' him a kick.
An' a canny bit kind of a fally, O.
That day a' Hawks's blacks may rue
They gat monny a varry sair clanker, O;
Can they de owse wi' Crowley's crew,
Frev a needle tiv an anchor, O.

Verse 7
What's that to say
To the bonny fray,
We had wi' skipper Robin, O;
The keel bullies aw,
Byeth greet an' sma',
Myed a beggarly tide o' the hoppen, O.
Gleed Will cried "Ma-a", up lup awd Frank,
An' Robin that marry'd his dowter, O;
We hammer'd their ribs like an anchor shank,
They fand it six weeks after, O.

Verse 8

Bald-pyet Jone Carr
Wad hav a bit spar,
To help his marrows away wid, O,
But poor awd fellow,
He'd getten ower mellow,
So we down'd byeth him an' Davy, O.
Then Petticoat Robin jumppt up agyen,
Wiv's gully to marcykree huz, Aw;
But Willayton Dan laid him flat wiv a styen,
Hurro ! for Crowley's crew, boys, Aw.

Verse 9
Their hash was sattled,
So off we rattled,
An' we jigged it up se hearty, O;
Wi' monny a shiver,
An' lowp se clivvor,
Can Newcassel turn oot sic a party, O?
When wheit dyun ower the fiddlers went,
We stagger'd ahint se merry, O,
An' thro' wor toon, till fairly spent,
Roar'd, "Crowley's crew an' glory, O"

=== History of the Hopping ===
The word "Hopping" meant "a fair" in Anglo-Saxon and "a dance" in middle English, and it is from this that it developed. Mainly in the North East of England, it changed from a small local village meeting with dancing, into a large annual funfair. These have changed over the years from ornate, carved and highly decorated small roundabouts to the larger attractions.

The Swalwell Hopping has its traditional way back in history. It was held annually at Whitsuntide and developed into a carnival of sports and horse racing before turning into the funfair. It was held for a time near the town gate at the waterside, and later moved to a more permanent home on the ground at the rear of Ridley Gardens (known locally as the Hopping Field.

One of, if not the, largest employers in the 19th century were the ironworks of Crowley and Co. at Swalwell and Winlaton. The workers were proud craftsmen. They allegedly could make anything "ftev a needle tiv an anchor". They were also political radicals, who worked hard in unpleasant conditions, and played hard. The workers, often referred to as "Crowley's Crew", together with the local keelmen, were always to be seen at the hoppings in the 18th and 19th centuries. According to the song, they all enjoyed themselves, and possibly became rather too boisterous.

In the 1950s, it was reported that at the annual Swalwell Hopping were "fairground rides such as the waltzer and carousel merry-go-round with traditional animal mounts, barley twist poles and fairy lights, a coconut shy, hoop-la stalls, a rifle range and other stalls where you could win various prizes, including a goldfish if you could throw a table tennis ball into one of many goldfish bowls. Many tickets were issued to schoolchildren giving half price rides for threepence and popular records of the day were amplified and played all evening" The various changes in life style sounded the death knell of the Swalwell in the 1960s. The "Hopping Field" is now a housing estate.

=== Places mentioned ===
- Swalwell was a village. It is now part of Newcastle upon Tyne
- Winlaton was a village in County Durham but is now part of Gateshead
- Whickham was a village in County Durham but is now part of Gateshead
- Newcassel is Newcastle upon Tyne
- Gyetside is Gateshead

=== Trades mentioned ===
Keelman were the dockers of yesteryear, who worked on the keels (or keelboats) of the River Tyne. Many, in fact the majority, resided as a close-knit community with their families in the Sandgate area, to the east of the city and beside the river. Their work included working on the keels/keelboats which were used to transfer coal from the river banks to the waiting colliers, for transport to various destinations including London.

== Comments on variations to the above version ==
There are various published versions of the song, and some seem to have difficulties in following the original Geordie dialect. Here are some of the variations :

- "wor" is written in some versions as "wour"
- "Hopping" is spelt variously as "Hoppen'" or "Hoppin'", with or without the final apostrophe
- " aw" is often written as "a'"
- "frae" may be written "fra"
- "se" is often written as "sae"
- "awd" may be written "aud"
- Verse 8 line 1 apparently refers to Joan Carr (or should that be John Carr)?
- Verse 9 line 6 "sic" is often written "sec"
- Verse 9 line 7 "wheit" has the meaning "quite"
- Other definitions and meanings can be found in Geordie dialect words

== See also ==
Geordie dialect words
