= John Selkirk =

English songwriter (1782–1843)

John Selkirk (1782–1843) was a Tyneside songwriter of the 18th and 19th century. His best-known works are those about Bob Cranky and the Swalwell Hopping. Selkirk was a contemporary of the earliest Geordie dialect poet/songwriters John (Jack) Shield and Thomas Thompson.

== Early life ==
John Selkirk was born in 1782 in Gateshead (just o'er the blue stane o' the brig), the son of George Selkirk, a local barber who had a shop in The Close, Newcastle.

He joined Messrs Strake and Boyd of The Quayside, Newcastle upon Tyne as a clerk.

His songs appear on "The Northern Minstrel or Gateshead Songster 1806–07".

He has been described as "The Otway of the local muse".

== Later life ==
At one stage, Selkirk moved to London in an attempt to find success as a merchant but this eluded him, and he returned to his native Tyneside in 1830, having failed in his endeavour. His final years were lived in poverty and destitution.

When aged 60 or 61, he drowned after falling into the River Tyne at or near Sandgate. The report of the inquest in the Newcastle Chronicle dated 18 November 1843 stated "...on the body of John Selkirk aged 60 who fell into the river near Sandgate on Saturday evening, and was drowned. The deceased was a person of singular habits and disposition, and had formerly been a respectable merchant in London; but latterly was so reduced in circumstances as to subsist upon the charity of the benevolent. For some time in the past he had slept nights on the shavings of a joiner's shop in Sandgate, and refused to accept parochial relief. On Saturday evening he was observed to carry a tin bottle to the river to obtain water, when he unfortunately fell in".

He was buried on 14 November 1843 in Ballast Hills burial-ground (plot Number 655).

== Works ==
The main character he seemed to write about was Bob Cranky, an habitual braggart. Written during his early life, specifically in his 20s, this material includes:

- Bob Cranky's 'Size Sunday ('Size being an abbreviation for Assize) (1804)
- Bob Cranky's Complaint
- Swalwell Hopping, to the tune of Irish air "Paddy's Wedding" (1807)
