= John Marshall (Newcastle publisher and printer) =

John Marshall was a late 18th and early 19th century publisher and printer in Tyneside, England. He also owned a bookshop and circulating library, and was a purveyor of tea, in Newcastle upon Tyne.

== Business career ==
John Marshall was a publisher, printer and bookseller. He also owned circulation libraries in Newcastle's Cloth Market, and Gateshead's Church Street between 1810 and 1831.

He was very politically active, and was a radical, who supported many causes (including those of Queen Caroline and the victims of the Peterloo Massacre at Manchester) and supported other radicals such as Samuel Bamford.

One of his larger publications was A Collection of Songs, Comic, Satirical, and Descriptive, chiefly in the Newcastle Dialect, and illustrative of the language and manners of the common people on the Banks of the Tyne and neighbourhood published in 1827.

He was very fortunate in 1810 to avoid a fire nearly destroying his house. One of the articles in "A Descriptive and Historical Account ….. Newcastle-upon-Tyne ….. and …. Gateshead….- Volume I" written by Eneas Mackenzie and published in c. 1827 tells of the fire and states :-

"Early on the morning of 22 February 1810, the steam corn and paper mill, on the premises of Mr. Harrison, baker, Gateshead, was discovered to be on fire; and, in a short time, the mill, Mr. Harrison's dwelling-house, and an adjoining house occupied by Mr. Anderson, grocer, were levelled with the ground. The house tenanted by Mr. John Marshall, printer, was with difficulty saved".

It appeared that the business closed in 1831 and the following report appeared in the London Gazette on "the 14th day of November 1831"

John Marshall, formerly residing at the Black-Walls, Forth-Lane, afterwards of Forth-House, Forth, and carrying on business in the Old Butcher-Market, now called the Cloth-Market, all in Newcastle-upon-Tyne, Printer, Stationer and Bookseller, and also Dealer in Tea, and Keeper of a Circulating Library, and late residing in Stowell-Street, in Newcastle-upon-Tyne, and carrying on business in the Cloth-Market aforesaid, Printer, Stationer, and Bookseller, and also Keeper of a Circulating Library, and also late of Stowell-Street, aforesaid, out of business.

== Works ==
These include :-

=== Political pamphlets, posters and booklets ===
Political pamphlets of many and varied (some now long forgotten) topics including :-

- The People's Right to Annual Parliaments
- A full Account of the general Meeting, on Monday 11 October 1819
- The Crimes of the Reformers
- The White Hat
- Address of the Reformers of Fawdon, &c
- Declaration and Rules of the Political Protestants, &c
- True Religion and Superstition compared and contrasted
- A Letter on the Persecution of W. H. Stephenson, a Methodist Preacher
- A Dialogue between a Methodist Preacher and a Reformer
- The Principles of British Parliamentary Reform

And many more

- The Northern Reformer's Monthly Magazine" was printed and published in 1823 and 1824 by John Marshall, price 1s.

=== Chapbooks and similar ===
The following includes :-

- A Collection of Songs, Comic, Satirical, and Descriptive, chiefly in the Newcastle Dialect published 1827 consisting of approx. 230 pages and over 130 song lyrics.
- A Garland of new songs – a collection of chap-books with this title, each containing a different set of songs
- A Garland of New Songs – The Death of Nelson; Lochaber; The Yellow-Hair'd Laddie; Whistle, and I'll Come to You, My Lad; The Yorkshire Concert – 8 pages published c 1810
- A garland of new songs – Allen A Dale; Paddy Carey; Ma chere amie; William Tell; Oh the moment was sad; The cottage on the moor – 8 pages
- A garland of new songs – The battle of the Nile; Tom Starboard; The sailor's adieu; Tom Bowling; True courage; The sea boy – 8 pages
- A garland of new songs – The Bay of Biscay; O, All's well; Poor Joe; the marine; The mid watch; The sea-boy; The sailor's adieu – 8 pages
- A garland of new songs – Bess the Gawkie; Blythe was she; Yorkshireman in London; Pray Goody – 8 pages published c1820
- A garland of new songs – The bonny Scotch lad and his bonnet so blue; The Blackbird; My sailor dear shall guard my pillow; Bundle of truths – 8 pages
- A garland of new songs – The fairest of the fair; Here's a health, &c; The sea- boy; Giles Scroggins' ghost; My only jo'an' dearie O; The beautiful maid; The royal love letter – 8 pages
- A garland of new songs – God save the king; Rule, Britannia; The jubilee; General Wolfe; The trumpet sounds a victory – 8 pages
- A garland of new songs – Little Bess the ballad-singer; I have a silent sorrow here; The girl of my heart; Here's hearts to sell; Toby Philpot – 8 pages
- A garland of new songs – Lovely Kitty; Woo'd and married and a'; The battle of Sherra-muir; If he will take the hint; By the gaily circling glass – 8 pages
- A garland of new songs – Mingle's bill of fare; A rosy cheek, a sparkling eye; When a maiden's about to be wedded; Rattan and Helen; When love at first; with soft emotion; The bewilder'd maid; Heigho, heigho !; When a man weds, he must make up his mind; I'm an old evergreen; When fresh I wak'd to life's unfolding day – 8 pages
- A garland of new songs – Muirland Willie; Maggie Lauder; As I walk'd by myself; Sandy o'er the lee – 8 pages
- A garland of new songs – My Nannie, O; Brisk Billy and Susan; John Anderson, my Joe; Mr O' Gallagher; The Irish wedding; The British constitution; The thorn – 8 pages
- A garland of new songs – The old cloaths man; Giles Scroggins' ghost; Roy's wife of Aldivalloch; The trumpet sounds a victory; Sweet is life – 8 pages
- A garland of new songs – The storm, by Mrs Robinson; A free mason's story; My eye and Betty Martin – 8 pages
- A garland of new songs – Tweed side; My Nanie, O; Highland laddie; Up in the morning early; Flowers of the forest – 8 pages
- A garland of new songs – The wee bit wife-akie; The bay of Biscay, O; Loudon's bonnie woods an' braes; Far, far from me my lover flies – 8 pages
- A garland of new songs – When o'er the midnight billow; Ah ! should my love in fight be slain; The fallen chieftain; The willow tree; Lodolin; Nelson's glory; Bending o'er the lofty yard; Lash'd to the helm; The negro's complaint – 8 pages
- A garland of new songs – Sweet Willy o' the Green; The Yorkshire Concert; The Yorkshire Irish man; The Woodland Maid – 8 pages
- A garland of new songs – Young Love among the Roses; My Nanie, O; God Save the King; Rule Britannia; Dear Is My Little Native Vale; General Wolfe's Song – 8 pages
- Garland of songs – The ugly club; Toby Philpot; Rule Britannia; The carroty 'squire; Of all the words in lexicon; The banks of the Dee – 8 pages
- The bullfinch – containing 21 celebrated popular songs – 24 pages
- The blackbird – being a choice collection of 22 popular songs – 24 pages
- The canary – a new song book – 21 of the most celebrated new songs – 24 p* ges
- The goldfinch – a new song book containing 17 celebrated songs – 24-page*
- The linnet – a new song book containing 11 songs – 24 pages
- The linnet (vol II) Contains 13 songs, including those in the preceding, except Auld lang syne
- The nightingale – a new song book being a choice collection of 21 songs – 14 pages
- The nightingale (vol II) contains 20 songs – 24 pages
- The robin redbreast – being a choice collection of 23 popular songs 24 pages
- The warbler – A new song book containing 18 celebrated songs – 24 pages
- The woodlark – A new song book being a choice collection of 16 of the most celebrated new songs – 24 pages
- The thrush – a new song book containing 19 songs – 24 pages
- Songs on Queen Caroline – containing songs very much in favour of Queen Caroline (1768–1821) was the estranged wife of George IV – with such songs as God Save the Queen. A New Song By Samuel Bamford, weaver, author and radical; Britons claim her as your Queen, to the tune of Scots wha ha'e wi' Wallace bled; and Queen Caroline's Return, to the tune of Rule Britannia – published c 1820
- Newcastle song-book – A collection of 40 song-books – 2 volumes
- Apollo's budget – A new song book containing 23 songs −24 pages
- Burns's songster – being a choice collection of songs by Robert Bums, the Ayrshire bard – 24 pages
- The comic songster – a new song book – Part I & 2 – 24 pages
- The lover's songster – being a choice collection of 25 celebrated love songs – 24 pages
- The medley – a new song book being a choice collection of 27 songs – 24 pages
- The melodist – a new song book being a rare and choice collection of 19 songs – 24 pages
- The minstrel – containing 19 new and popular songs – 24 pages
- The muses – Being a choice collection of 22 of the most celebrated and popular songs – 24 pages
- The musical miscellany – containing a choice collection of 24 celebrated Songs – 24 pages
- The new London songster – being a choice collection of 14 songs – 24 pages
- The new theatrical songster – being a choice collection of 28 celebrated new songs – 24 pages
- The Newcastle songster; being songs descriptive of the language and manners of the common people of Newcastle upon Tyne and the neighbourhood – Parts i–vi – each of 24 pages
- The radical reformers' new book – Being a choice collection of patriotic songs – 24 pages
- The sailor's songster – a new song book of 20 songs – 24 pages
- The siren – a new song book being a choice collection of 16 songs – 24 pages
- The Thespian songster – being 17 songs some of them sung at the Theatre-Royal, Newcastle by Messrs Braham, Grimaldi, Newton, Lancaster, Miss Byrne, &c – 24 pages
- Songs, duets, choruses, &c. in Tom & Jerry as sung at the Newcastle theatre. With a glossary of all the cant and flash phrases – 24 pages
- The vocalist – a new song book being a choice collection of 14 celebrated new songs, some of them sung by Mr Liston and Mathews at various theatres – 24 pages
- The fashionable dandies' songster – Being a collection of 18 of the most charming, exquisite, popular and most approved dandy songs – 24 pages
- Nancy's fancy – A new song book containing a choice collection of 23 popular and esteemed songs – 24 pages
- Grand musical festival, Newcastle upon Tyne. Songs, glees, duets, choruses, &c. sung at the grand concerts at the Theatre- Royal 5, 6 and 8 Oct 1824 – to which are added the songs omitted on account of the absence of some of the principal vocal performers. Also the admired songs "O say not woman's heart is bought" and "Worten wedding" in the Cumberland dialect – 20 pages
