= John Shield (songwriter) =

English songwriter

John Shield (1768 – 6 August 1848) was an English songwriter. One of his best known and liked songs at the time was "Bob Cranky's Adieu". Shield was a contemporary of the earliest Geordie dialect songwriters Thomas Thompson and John Selkirk.

== Early life ==
He was born at Broomhaugh, a village in Northumberland near Riding Mill in the Tyne Valley in 1768.

He and his elder brother, Hugh, moved to Newcastle upon Tyne in John's twenties, and the first real mention of him was in 1800 when they were running the family's large wholesale/grocery business, which they had built up. The business was in Middle Street, facing the Cloth Market and opposite where the "White Hart" stood.

In 1803, his name is on a petition protesting against taxes.

Shield had a free and easy nature, was remarkably quiet and inoffensive, and, it seems, wrote dialect materials as a hobby. His brother Hugh was the opposite and could have a fiery temper.

His first poetic/musical offering appeared in 1802 in the Newcastle Chronicle and he later went on to write well-known Tyneside songs about William Scott (alias Cull Billy; alias Silly Billy). He wrote the famous successful appeal for Scott's aid. Two of his other works, "Lord Size" and "Fair Delia" appear in the Northern Songster in 1806.

His song "Oxygen Gas" was noted as being sung at the Theatre Royal, Newcastle.

== Later life ==
Around 1830, the council purchased the family property in Middle Street, together with most of the adjacent property in the area, to demolish them for major improvements. The Shields moved to new premises at the top of Dean Street. Towards the end of 1890, the descendants sold the property and business thus closing the almost-one-hundred-year connection of the family with the area.

Hugh Shield was unmarried and retired from the business c. 1830, leaving it to John; Hugh purchased a small estate in Broomhaugh, where he lived in retirement.

John Shield was married with a family and moved to a property near St. Andrew's Church, Newgate Street, Newcastle upon Tyne. After Hugh's death, John retired from the business, leaving it to his sons and moved into his brother's estate.

== Death ==
He died, age 80, in Broomhaugh.

== Works ==
His works include:

- "The Barber's News (or "Shields in an Uproar") – to the tune of "Miss Bailey's Ghost"; published c. 1805, this song refers to Stephen Kemble, the large manager of the Theatre Royal, Newcastle, capsizing a boat on which he was crossing the River Tyne between North and South Shields.
- "Blackett's Field" – makes fun of the local preparations to defend against the possible arrival of Napoleon and the French.
- "Bob Cranky's Adieu" – published c. 1812; Bob Cranky was a fictitious cartoon-like character, rather like the modern Andy Capp, and in this song he joined the Volunteer Association in the march from Gateshead to Newcastle upon Tyne
- "The Bonny Geatsiders" – published c. 1812; a light-hearted song about a group of volunteers from Gateshead who only managed to see action in manoeuvres in the locality
- "Defence of the Name of Jack"
- "Delia's Answer
- "Fair Delia"
- "Lines on Gull Billy
- "My Lord 'Size" (or "Newcastle in an Uproar") – published c. 1806, remarking on the occasion when one of the Newcastle upon Tyne judges taking part, with other civic dignitaries, in the parade on the River Tyne, whilst stepping into or from the barge at Tynemouth, slipped into the water
- "O No, My Love, No"
- "Oxygen Gas" – noted for being sung at the Theatre Royal, Newcastle
- "Poor Tom, the Blind Boy"

"The Pitman's Revenge (against Bonaparte)" was erroneously credited to John Shield in many early manuscripts. A correction was made in the 1891 edition of Allan's Illustrated Edition of Tyneside Songs and Readings where the writing was credited to George Cameron.

== See also ==
- Geordie dialect words
