= The Newcastle Eccentrics =

The Newcastle Eccentrics were a group of unrelated people who lived in and around the centre of Newcastle and its quayside between the end of the 18th century and middle of the 19th.

== Related secondary scholarship ==
- Harker, D. (1981). "The Making of the Tyneside Concert Hall". Popular Music. Folk or Popular? Distinctions, Influences, Continuities. 1: 26–56. JSTOR 853242.

== Background ==
Around the end of the 18th century and the early and mid 19th century there were many characters frequenting the town centre and quayside of old Newcastle. These were characters who were described as "Worthies", "Props" or "Eccentrics" and would later be more gently described as "unfortunates". All had some form of physical or mental disability, but were looked upon as "unfortunates" and generally liked, respected and looked after by the population of hard working inhabitants.

There was a famous picture painted in c1817 by Henry Perlee Parker, showing 14 of the characters (and a dog), all persons living in the area at the time. The painting is now known in some quarters as Hells Kitchen, (an alternative name for "Newcastle Worthies", "Newcastle Props" or "Newcastle Eccentrics"), which was the room in which the group were positioned, a room in The Flying Horse, a “down market” drinking house. The property in the Groat Market, Newcastle, has since gone through several name changes including "The Princess Hotel" and "The Golden Bengal Indian Restaurant".

Some of these appeared in songs of the time, some in several songs. Below are listed some of these (and other) "Worthies" :-

== List ==
- Airchie Loggan

The person is In the song Newcassel Props written by William Oliver, but not in the painting

  - Anty Shoe-tie - see Shoe-tie Anty
  - Archy, or Archibald Henderson - See Bold Archy
- Aud (or Awd) Judy

One of the Eccentrics in the painting Aud Judy, real name Judy Downey (or sometimes Judy Downing) The Monthly Chronicle of North Country Lore and Legend 1887 states "There is in the City Treasurer's office a half-length portrait in oils, by H. P. Parker, of Judith Dowlings, or "Old Judy" the messenger to the Council Chamber.

She is represented leaning upon the formidable stick which she was carried to keep the precinct of the town's chamber clear of loitering boys or others having no business there.

  - Ballo Jenny - See Jenny Ballo
  - Barbara Bell - One of the guests at Euphy's Coronation
  - Barrel-bagg'd Joe - One of the guests at Euphy's Coronation
  - Bella Grey (Young Bella Grey) - One of the guests at Euphy's Coronation
- Bella Roy

Drucken Bella Roy was a well-known street trader, selling all kinds of food from fruit and vegetables to fish etc. She was an attractive and neat young woman but sixty years later was an object of pity, thanks to the abuse of alcohol. Robert Nunn wrote of her in his song "Drucken Bella Roy, O!", sung to the tune of "Duncan M'Callaghan".

This song appears in Allan's Tyneside Songs and Fordyce's Tyne Songster

  - Benjamin Starky – Captain - see Captain Benjamin Starkey
  - Bet (Bouncing Bet) - One of the guests at Euphy's Coronation
  - Bet (young Beagle Bet) - One of the guests at Euphy's Coronation
  - Big Bob - One of the guests at Euphy's Coronation
  - Billy Conolly - an alias of William Cleghorn - see William Cleghorn
  - Billy Hush - One of the guests at Euphy's Coronation
  - Blind Willy - see Purvis William
  - Bob Whin - see Whin Bob
- Bold Archy (or Airchy)

One of the Eccentrics in the painting Bold Archy, or Archibald Henderson, alias Bold Archy or Bold Airchy, was a giant of a man of immense muscular power, but very inoffensive in his manners and with some excellent traits. He was attached to his mother who was a little woman, yet one word from her was all that was needed charm him into meekness. It was quite common for her to lead Archy away from any fights or arguments he may have got involved in. Although not a quarrelsome man, his size and eccentricity was often a magnet for bullies. Archibald was never married, but once apparently found a young maid who lived on the Quayside and of who he said she was almost as canny a woman as his mother. A compliment indeed. Archibald Henderson died 14 May 1828, aged 86 years.

Bold Archy appears in several songs including :-

1. On the Death of Bold Archy, written by R Gilchrist appears in Allan's Tyneside Songs and Fordyce's Tyne Songster
2. "Bold Archy Drowned" written by R Gilchrist appears in Allan's Tyneside Songs
3. Bold Archy and Blind Willie's Lament (On the Death of Captain Starkey) written by R Gilchrist, and appears in France's Songs of the Bards of the Tyne, Marshall's Collection of Songs 1827 and Ross’ Songs of the Tyne volume 9 page 13
4. And in the song “Blind Willie’s Singing” written by R Gilchrist, “Bold Archy said it was a treat To hear Blind Willie singin”.
  - Bugle-Nosed Jack - One of the Eccentrics in the painting
- Captain Benjamin Starky

One of the Eccentrics in the painting Captain Benjamin Starkey was an inhabitant of the Freeman's Hospital in Newcastle. He told Thomas Allan that he was unable to remember how or when he took, or was given, the title “Captain”. He was small in stature but “uncommonly polished in his manners, taking off his hat and kissing his hand with an air of excessive good breeding, and which at the same time bore no resemblance of either affection or buffoonery”. He was vain in so far as he revelled in being treated royally, and would talk freely about his friends Sir Matthew Ridley and Charles Brandling. Starkey was a very neat writer and had a habit of writing out promissory I.O.U's for just a few pence to certain people. He was fond of being treated to a glass of ale and very grateful for trifling favours and anyone showing him with deference were for ever entitled to a polite bow.

Captain Benjamin Starkey died 9 July 1822

Starkey was of dwarfish proportions and in his younger days he had been an usher at a school in Fetter-Lane, from where he was remembered by Charles Lamb, who attended the same school the year after Starkey left. Lamb mentions him in his book “1822 Essays and sketches by Charles Lamb”.

Captain Benjamin Starkey appears in several songs including :-

1. Bold Archy and Blind Willie's Lament (On the Death of Captain Starkey), written by R Gilchrist appears in Allan's Tyneside Songs, Fordyce's Tyne Songster, France's Songs of the Bards of the Tyne, Marshall's Collection of Songs 1827 and Ross’ Songs of the Tyne volume 9 page 13
  - Chancellor Kell (Chuckle-head Chancellor Kell) - One of the guests at Euphy's Coronation
  - Cleghorn, William - see William Cleghorn
  - Conolly, Billy - an alias of William Cleghorn - see William Cleghorn
  - Coxon Jacky - See Jackie Coxon
  - Cruddace, Robert - see Whin Bob
- Cuckoo Jack - the alias of John Wilson

John Wilson (1792 – 1860) was better known as Cuckoo Jack. His nickname came about because his father making cuckoo clocks. Cuckoo Jack worked for the corporation for much of his life. He was a barge –rower who seemed to have a remarkable knack of finding things in the river whether watches, money or similar objects and even bodies. He was known to be honest and would hand any and everything over to the authorities and in return received only a modest sum, described by Thomas Allan in his Illustrated Edition of Tyneside Songs and Readings as “restored to their owners for a trifling remuneration”.

Cuckoo Jack died 2 December 1860, aged 68.

Cuckoo Jack's name appears in several songs including :-

1. Mally and the prophet, written by Emery, which appears in Allan's Tyneside Songs and France's Songs of the Bards of the Tyne
2. Luckey's Dream written by Robert Nunn, and appears in Allan's Tyneside Songs, Fordyce's Tyne Songster, France's Songs of the Bards of the Tyne, Ross’ Songs of the Tyne volume 1 page 10 and Walker's Songs of the Tyne Volume 1
3. Polly's Nickstick written by J P Robson, appears in Allan's Tyneside Songs, France's Songs of the Bards of the Tyne and Walker's Songs of the Tyne Volume 2 page 3
4. Hamlick, Prince of Denton – Part the Second, written by J P Robson and appears in Allan's Tyneside Songs and France's Songs of the Bards of the Tyne
5. The Deeth o' Cuckoo Jack, written by Edward Corvan and appears in Allan's Tyneside Songs
6. Steam Soup (or Cuckoo Jack's Petition), written by Robert Emery and appears in Fordyce's Tyne Songster and France's Songs of the Bards of the Tyne
7. Bold Archy and Blind Willie's Lament (On the Death of Captain Starkey) written by Robert Gilchrist, and appears in Allan's Tyneside Songs, Fordyce's Tyne Songster, Marshall's Collection of Songs 1827 and Ross’ Songs of the Tyne volume 9 page 13
- Cuddy Billy - alias of William Maclachlan

William Maclachlan was better known as "Cuddy Willy". He was one of the several well-known Newcastle eccentrics who for years walked the streets without hat or shoes, and in scanty and tattered clothes. He eked out a living by playing his fiddle (a home-made contraption which was simply a flat piece of wood, on which he tied a few pieces of string) in the streets or public-houses. He was addicted to drink and his death was caused by some idiots in one of the public bars, shamefully feeding him brandy as long as he would drink it. The result was that he died from the effects of the excess.

His death took place 27 September 1847.

Cuddy Willy appears in "Cuddy Willy's Deeth" written by Joshua I. Bagnall, a song that appears in Allan's Tyneside Songs Walker's Songs of the Tyne Volume 2

- Cull Billy (or Silly Billy) – alias of William Scott

One of the Eccentrics in the painting William Scott was better known as "Cull Billy" or "Silly Billy" and was a native of Newcastle, an inmate of St. John's poor-house. He was a very harmless creature, and once much pestered by the wantonness of the boys in the streets of Newcastle. He lived with his mother, a poor old woman who made her living by hawking wooden ware. She, like her son, was an object of ridicule to some distress, being only four feet (1.2m) high. Billy, as many other handicapped people, could show signs of brilliance. He would often recite (with a degree of exactness not normally found), several prayers, scripture passages, poetry etc. He was very good natured and had a great wit. It is recorded that when a drunken gentlemen came out of a public house, he turned to Billy and said "Stand out of the way, Stand out of the way, I never give place to fools", to which Willy retorted, “But I do", bowing and stepping aside.

Billy died at St. John's Poor-house on 31 July 1831, aged 68 years.

Cull Billy appears in several songs including :-

1. Cull Billy's Prize by Robert Emery, appears in Allan's Tyneside Songs
2. Blind Willie, versus Billy Scott by Thomas Marshall appears in Allan's Tyneside Songs and Original (Geordie) Local Songs By Thomas Marshall 1829 page 8
  - Dolly Raw (bauld Dolly Raw) - One of the guests at Euphy's Coronation
  - Donald, sometimes referred to as Lousy Donald - One of the Eccentrics in the painting
  - Doodem Daddum (with his Dog, Timour, added) - One of the Eccentrics in the painting
  - Downey (or sometimes Downing), Judy - see Aud (or Awd) Judy
- Euphy Scott (or sometimes Heuffy Scott)

Was an unknown character who appeared in several songs, including :-

1. Euphy's Coronation written by Thomas Marshall, and appears in Allan's Tyneside Songs, Fordyce's Tyne Songster, France's Songs of the Bards of the Tyne and Original (Geordie) Local Songs By Thomas Marshall 1829
2. Newcassel Props written by William Oliver, and appears in Allan's Tyneside Songs, Fordyce's Tyne Songster, France's Songs of the Bards of the Tyne, Marshall's Collection of Songs 1827 and Walker's Songs of the Tyne Volume 3 page 12
3. Blind Willie Singin’ written by R Gilchrist and appears in Allan's Tyneside Songs, Fordyce's Tyne Songster, Marshall's Collection of Songs 1827 and Ross’ Songs of the Tyne volume 7 page 6
4. The Newcassel Worthies written by William “Willie” Armstrong, and appears in Fordyce's Tyne Songster, France's Songs of the Bards of the Tyne, Marshall's Collection of Songs 1827 and Ross’ Songs of the Tyne volume 4 page 3
5. Luckey's Dream written by Robert Nunn, and appears in Allan's Tyneside Songs, Fordyce's Tyne Songster, France's Songs of the Bards of the Tyne, Ross’ Songs of the Tyne volume 1 page 10 and Walker's Songs of the Tyne Volume 1
6. In Euphy's Coronation, many other people came including Barbara Bell, Barrel-bagg'd Joe, Bella Grey (Young Bella Grey), Beagle Bet (young Beagle Bet), Big Bob, Billy Hush, Chancellor Kell (Chuckle-head Chancellor Kell), Dolly Raw (bauld Dolly Raw), Jim Bo, Mal (Putty-mouth Mall), Mally Ogle, Peggy Grundy, Rag Sall and Ralphy the Hawk.
  - Ferns, Tommy - see Tommy (on the Bridge)
  - Hangy (or Hangie) - One of the Eccentrics in the painting
  - Henderson, Archibald - see Bold Archy (or Airchy)
  - Heuffy Scott - see Euphy Scott
  - Jack - see Bugle-Nosed Jack OR Cuckoo Jack
- Jacky Coxon (sometimes Cockson)

One of the Eccentrics in the painting.

1. Jacky Coxon appears in "The Pitman's Dream - or A description of the North Pole", written by Emery. This song appears in France's Songs of the Bards of the Tyne, Fordyce's Tyne Songster, Marshall's Collection of Songs 1827 and Ross’ Songs of the Tyne
  - Jacky Tate - The person is In the song Newcassel Props written by William Oliver, but not in the painting
  - Jenny Ballo - One of the Eccentrics in the painting
  - Jim Bo - One of the guests at Euphy's Coronation
  - John Wilson -better known as Cuckoo Jack - see Cuckoo Jack
  - Judy - see Aud (or Awd) Judy
  - Loggan, Airchy - see Airchy Loggan
  - Maclachlan William - see Cuddy Billy
  - Mal (Putty-mouth Mall) - One of the guests at Euphy's Coronation
  - Mally Ogle - One of the guests at Euphy's Coronation
  - Peggy Grundy - One of the guests at Euphy's Coronation
- Purvis, William – or Blind Willie 1752 – 1832

One of the Eccentrics in the painting - See separate entry for William Purvis (Blind Willie)

  - Pussy Willy - One of the Eccentrics in the painting
  - Rag Sall - One of the guests at Euphy's Coronation
  - Ralphy the Hawk - One of the guests at Euphy's Coronation
  - Robert Cruddace - see Whin Bob
  - Roy, Bella - see Bella Roy
  - Scott William - see Cull Billy
  - Scott, Heuffy or Euphy - see Euphy Scott
  - Shoe-tie Anty - One of the Eccentrics in the painting
  - Silly Billy - see Cull Billy
  - Starkey Captain B - see Captain Benjamin Starky
  - Tate, Jacky - see Jacky Tate
- Tommy (on the Bridge), Tommy Ferns

Tommy Ferns was a character, almost blind and suffering from partial paralysis of his hands. For around 30 years he stood on the Swing Bridge across the River Tyne between Newcastle and Gateshead begging. It was probably because of his sight problem he was able to tell the difference between the coins by both their feel and sound.

1. The song about him "Tommy on the Bridge" was written by R. J. Wilkinson appears on page 572 of Allan's Tyneside Songs
  - Whin Bob - an alias of Robert Cruddace - One of the Eccentrics in the painting
  - William Cleghorn

See separate entry for William Cleghorn

  - Willy Pussy - see Pussy Willy
  - Wilson, John - better known as Cuckoo Jack - See Cuckoo Jack

In the painting of Hells Kitchen, are the following characters (in alphabetical order)
Aud (or Awd) Judy, Blind Willie, Bold Archy (or Airchy), Bugle-Nosed Jack, Captain Starkey, Cull (or Cully) Billy, Donald, Doodem Daddum (with his Dog, Timour, added), Hangy (or Hangie), Jacky Coxon, Jenny Ballo, Pussy Willy, Shoe-tie Anty and Whin Bob

== See also ==
Geordie dialect words
Thomas Allan
Allan's Illustrated Edition of Tyneside Songs and Readings
W & T Fordyce
The Tyne Songster
P. France & Co.
France's Songs of the Bards of the Tyne - 1850
John Marshall
Marshall's Collection of Songs, Comic, Satirical 1827
John Ross
The Songs of the Tyne by Ross
William R Walker
The Songs of the Tyne by Walker
Thomas Marshall
Marshall's A Collection of original local songs
