= Hell's Kitchen (painting) =

Painting by Henry Perlee Parker

- Artist: Henry Perlee Parker
- Year: c. 1817
- Type: Oil on Canvas
- Dimensions: 62.8 cm × 75.5 cm (24 3/4 in × 29 3/4 in)
- Location: Newcastle City Library, Newcastle

Hell's Kitchen is one of the names of a famous painting showing many of the eccentrics living in the Newcastle area in the early 19th century.

== Background ==
Around the end of the 18th century and the early and mid 19th century there were many characters frequenting the town centre and Quayside of old Newcastle. These were characters who were described as "worthies", "props" or "eccentrics" and would later be more gently described as "unfortunates". All had some form of physical or mental disability, to different degrees, but were looked upon as "unfortunates" and generally liked, respected and looked after by the population of hard working inhabitants.

== The painting ==
In or around 1817 the Devonport born, (now resident in Newcastle) painter, Henry Perlee Parker, painted his now famous picture of many of these characters. It shows 14 people (and a dog), all persons living in the area at the time. The painting is now known in some quarters as Hells Kitchen. This was the nickname of a room in The Flying Horse (later named the Princess Hotel followed by The Golden Bengal Indian Restaurant) in the Groat Market (off Collingwood Street), Newcastle, which was the setting for the painting.

It was a "down market" drinking house whose clientele allegedly included Blind Willy, the fiddler, Captain Starkey, Aad Judy, Cull Billy, Bold Archie, Bugle Nosed Jack, Doodem Daddum and Shoe-Tie Anty. It was reputed that the cellar contained a trap door to a hidden tunnel to the Quayside.

Unfortunately the oil painting is now lost, but fortunately a Mr George Armstrong, a Newcastle engraver, had made a copy. This copy was published c1820 by E. Charnley, a bookseller in the Bigg Market.

An index provided with the engraving and printed at the bottom of the picture reveals the identities of these eccentric characters, many of whom were the subject of local songwriters. The list of the characters, (in alphabetical order) is :- Aud (or Awd) Judy, Blind Willie, Bold Archy (or Airchy), Bugle-Nosed Jack, Captain Starkey, Cull (or Cully) Billy, Donald, Doodem Daddum (with his Dog, Timour, added), Hangy (or Hangie), Jacky Coxon, Jenny Ballo, Pussy Willy, Shoe-tie Anty and Whin Bob. The portrait forms part of a collection held by Newcastle City Library.

== Copies to view ==
Among the copies are the following :-

- A copy in black and white is available on the "Farne – Folk Archive Resource North East" site and is headed across the top of the picture "Eccentrics and well-known characters of Newcastle upon Tyne". Along the base are a set of numbers and below the picture, a list of the characters and their positional numbers.
- Another picture, this time in colour, is on the Flickr Website.

== The song ==
The song, entitled "Newcassel Props" telling of some of these characters, was written by William Oliver

== See also ==
Geordie dialect words
The Newcastle Eccentrics of the 19th century
Newcassel Props
William Oliver
William "Willie" Armstrong
The Newcassel Worthies
Henry Perlee Parker
