= Cleghorn =

Cleghorn and Claghorn are Scottish surnames that may refer to:

== People ==
- Archibald Scott Cleghorn (1835–1910), Scottish businessman who married into Hawaiian royal family
  - Daughter: Victoria Kaʻiulani Cleghorn (1875–1899), Crown Princess of Hawaii
- Edward J. Claghorn (1856–1936), granted first patent for seat belts in 1885
- Elizabeth Gaskell, English novelist, biographer, and short story writer, née Elizabeth Cleghorn Stevenson
- George Cleghorn (Scottish physician) (1716–1789) physician, and teacher at Dublin University
- George Claghorn (1748–1824), American patriot and master shipwright who oversaw construction of the USS Constitution ("Old Ironsides")
- Harold Cleghorn (1912–1996), New Zealand weightlifter
- Sir Hugh Cleghorn (colonial administrator) (1752–1837), colonial secretary to British Ceylon
- Hugh Francis Cleghorn (1820–1895), physician, botanist, forest conservationist and the colonial administrator's grandson
- Isabel Cleghorn (1852–1922), British educationist and suffragist
- John Cleghorn (born 1941), Canadian businessman
- Kate Claghorn (1864–1938), American Progressive Era scholar and activist
- Mildred Cleghorn (1910–1997), Chiricahua Apache dollmaker, educator, and tribal leader
- Sarah Norcliffe Cleghorn (1876–1959), US author and social reformer known for her four-line satiric poem, "The Golf Links"
- Sprague Cleghorn (1890–1956), Canadian ice hockey player
- William Cleghorn (1718–1754), British philosopher
- William Cleghorn (Newcastle eccentric) (1777–1860), last of the old eccentrics of Newcastle upon Tyne

== Places ==
- Cleghorn, Scotland, small village near Lanark, South Lanarkshire
- Cleghorn Glen, site of special scientific interest near Cleghorn, Scotland
- Cleghorn, Iowa, small city in the United States
- Cleghorn Lakes Wilderness California
- Claghorn, Pennsylvania, ghost town in the United States
- Cleghorn, Wisconsin, unincorporated
- A district in the city of Fitchburg, Massachusetts
- Cleghorn Mountain, mountain in San Bernardino County, California, United States

== Fiction ==
- Senator Claghorn, character on The Fred Allen Show
  - Foghorn Leghorn, American animated character that was based on Senator Claghorn
