= Charles Sandoe Gilbert =

Charles Sandoe Gilbert (1760–1831) was a Cornish druggist and historian of Cornwall.

== Life ==
The son of Thomas Gilbert, Charles was born in the parish of Kenwyn, near Truro, in 1760. In conjunction with a Mr. Powell he became an itinerant vendor of medicines in Cornwall and Devon. On Powell's retirement Gilbert continued the business alone, but later took on a Mr. Parrot. Later on he had establishments at 29 Market Street, Plymouth, and at Fore Street, Devonport, with a staff of six travellers.

In about 1810 Gilbert was led to believe that he might claim descent from the Gilberts of Compton Castle, Devon. Antiquarian studies saw him undertake a general history of Cornwall. In the course of his journeys through Cornwall he took notes, and also had his travellers collect information. After 1812 he was accompanied on several excursions by the artist Henry Perlee Parker. The first volume appeared in 1817 of An Historical Survey of the County of Cornwall, to which is added a Complete Heraldry of the same, with numerous Woodcuts, 592 pages. The second volume came out in 1820, 962 pages. Although Gilbert was patronized by successive dukes of Northumberland, and obtained a number of subscribers, the work cost double his estimate.

According to Joseph Polsue in his Complete Parochial History of the County of Cornwall: "There are many errors in the topographical portion of the History, and a number of misplaced paragraphs; and nearly the whole of the monumental inscriptions given were imperfectly and carelessly transcribed".

During the progress of his Survey Gilbert had money troubles, and on 29 October 1825 he was gazetted a bankrupt. The next year he moved to London, where, taking Gilbert Morrish into partnership, he opened a chemist's shop at 27 Newcastle Street, The Strand, London. He died at the same address 30 May 1831. He was buried in the churchyard of the Savoy Hospital, where a headstone was erected to his memory.
