= The Newcassel Worthies =

Song performed by William "Willie" Armstrong

Song by William "Willie" Armstrong
- Language: English (Geordie)
- Written: 1900s
- Songwriter: William "Willie" Armstrong

The Newcassel Worthies is a famous Geordie folk song written in the 19th century by William "Willie" Armstrong, in a style deriving from music hall.

== Lyrics ==
Air- We're aye been provided for

The praises o' Newcassel aw've lang wish'd to tell,
But now then aw'm determin'd to ha'e a right good spell,
An' shew what noted kiddies frae Newcassel toon hes flit,
For it's a' wis been a canny place, an' sae will it yet.

A chep, they call'd him Scott, he liev'd on the banks o' Tyne,
Had a son, that i' the Government he wanted to shine:
By degrees the youth he rose up, now Lord Chancellor does sit,
An' he's fill'd his place reet brawly, aye an' sae will they yet.

Of a' the fine Engravers that grace fine Lunnen toon,
Wor Tom Ransom an' Bill Harvey bang a' that's up or doon:
The praises frae the 'Cademy they constantly do get;
For their pieces they've got medals, aye an' sae will they yet.

For boxing tee, the Lunnen cheps we'll thresh them i' their turns;
Ony see what science he has lairnt—that noted chep, Jem Burns:
Jem Wallace tee, wor champion, how Tommy Dunn, he hit,
But they both good ones ever were, an' sae will they yet.

A vast mair cliver cheps we ha'e o' some aw'll let ye knaw;
For a strong man, whe could beat Bold Airchy wi' his wondrous claw;
When six men tuik him in a boat, her bottom suen he split,
An' the hiding that he ga'e them, they've not forgot it yet.

For fiddling tee, now whe is there wor Blind Willie can beat?
Or for dancing whe before Jack Coxon e'er could set their feet?
Cully Billy, only try him now, he'll cap ye wi' his wit;
He's truly wondrous, ever was, an' sae will he yet.

Bob Cruddace, ah, poor soul! he's deed, – he had a cliver knack
O' kepping beer, aye three yards off, when he "parish'd the pack!"
An' Whin Bob 'bout the militia constantly does swet;
But by cunningness escap'd them, aye an' sac will he yet.

Jack Nicholson, the noble soul, a deal o' breeding shows,
Got a patent frae the King to splet sheep heads wi' his nose;
The butchers fearing o' disgrace, a job he ne'er cud get,
But the honour's e'er been wi' him, aye, an' sae will it yet.

Of Fishwives, tee, that's i' wor toon, up to the present day,
Euphy Scott she is prime minister to Queen Madgie Gray:
The understrappers and descendants hear it's ony fit,
That's she's rul'd the market as she lik'd, an' sae will she yet.

Captain Starkey, Pussey Willie, and poor Cuddy Reed,
Lousy Donald an' au'd judy, poor souls! they've a' gyen deed:
But, marrows, keep ye up your hearts, this is not the time to fret,
For their memories ha' e'er been up, aye an' sae will they yet.

=== Places mentioned ===
- Newcassel is Newcastle upon Tyne
- Tyne is the River Tyne
- Lunnen is London

=== People mentioned ===
- John Scott, served twice as Lord Chancellor of Great Britain, son of William
- William Scott of Sandgate, father of John
- Thomas "Tom" Ranson – an engraver (name spelt incorrectly as "Ransom"
- William "Bill" Harvey, another engraver
- Jem Burns and Jem Wallace were local boxing champions
- Blind Willie, is William Purvis.
- A famous Newcastle oil painting Hell's Kitchen by Henry Perlee Parker, painted around 1817 shows numerous of the eccentric characters supposedly living in the area at the time. Unfortunately the painting is now lost, but an engraving taken from it by George Armstrong and a print of this (published by E. Charnley, a bookseller in the Bigg Market) in c1820. Fortunately an index was provided and this list (in alphabetical order) is:
- Aud (or Awd) Judy, Blind Willie, Bold Archy (or Airchy), Bugle-Nosed Jack, Captain Starkey, Cull (or Cully) Billy, Donald, Doodem Daddum (with his Dog, Timour, added), Hangy (or Hangie), Jacky Coxon, Jenny Ballo, Pussy Willy, Shoe-tie Anty and Whin Bob – all of whom were often the subjects of songs and songwriters.

== Comments on variations to the above version ==
In the early 19th century, as today, there were cheap books and magazines. Many of these "chapbooks" were on poor quality paper to a poor standard and with poor quality print. The works were copied with no thoughts of copyright, and the work required very little proof-reading, and what was done was not required to a high standard. Consequently, the dialect words of songs varied between editions. Some of the differences are interpretation of the dialect, some down to simple mistakes. Some of the most common are listed below:

- Verse 3 Line 1 – "fine" replaced with "fair Lunnen toon"
- Verse 5 Line 2 – "bold Airchy" had been written erroneously as "both Airchy"
- Verse 6 Line 2 – The name "Jack Coxon" spelt as "Cockson"
- Verse 7 Line 1 – The name "Bob Cruddace" spelt as "Cruddance"
- Verse 7 Line 2 – "kepping" replaced with "keeping beer"
- Verse 9 Line 3 – Changed from "hear it's ony fit" to "maintain that it was fit"
- Verse 9 Line 4 – "That's she's rul'd the market" replaced with "he should rule the market"

== See also ==
Geordie dialect words
