= Cleghorn Lakes Wilderness =

Protected wilderness area in California, United States

- IUCN category Ib (wilderness area)
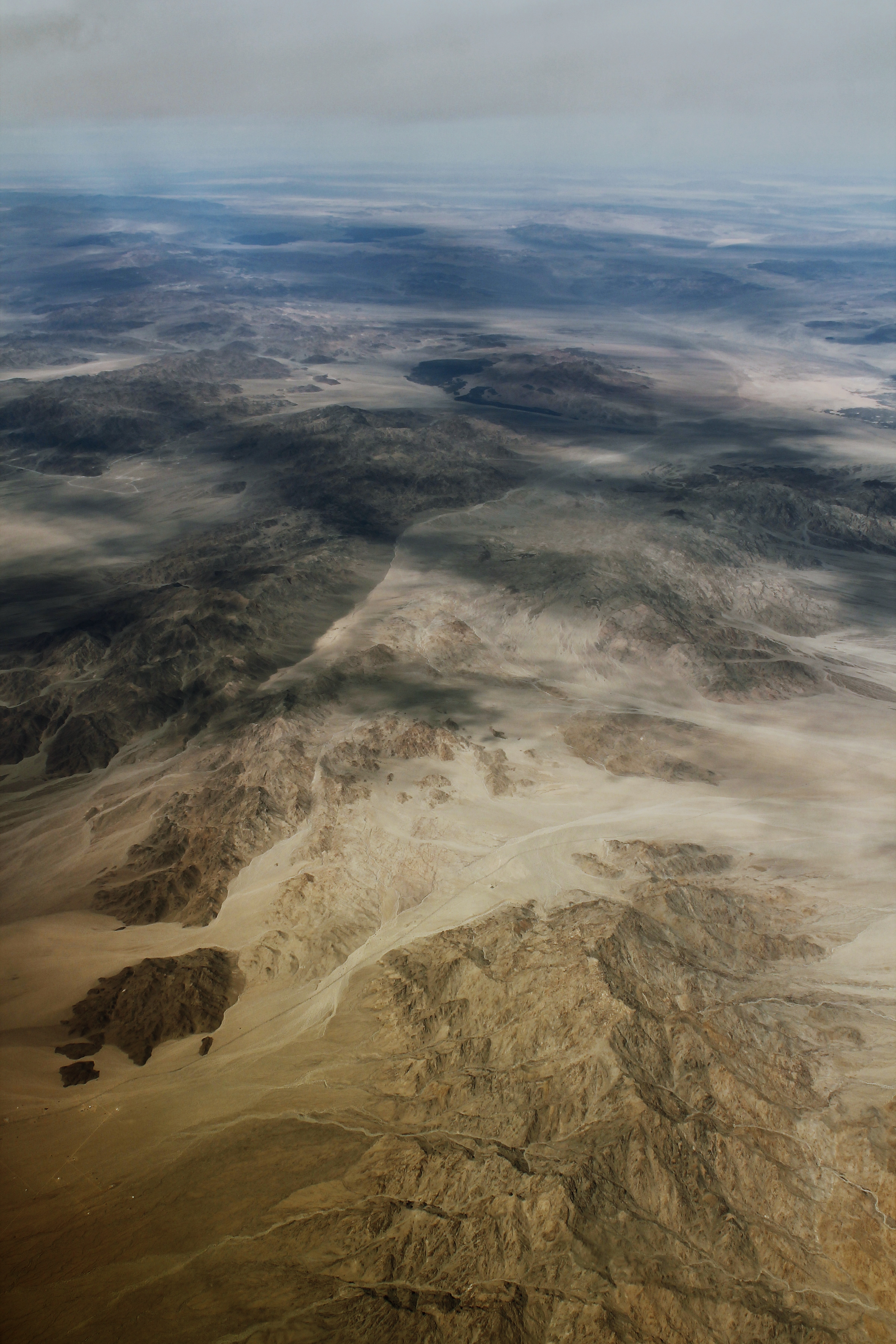
- Aerial image of the area

- Location within California Location within the United States
- Location: San Bernardino County, California
- Nearest city: Twentynine Palms, California
- Coordinates: 34°15′21″N 115°48′39″W
- Area: 39,167 acres (158.50 km^{2})
- Established: 1994
- Governing body: Bureau of Land Management

The Cleghorn Lakes Wilderness is a 39,167-acre (158.50 km^{2}) wilderness area in the southern Mojave Desert. It is located 16 miles (26 km) northeast of Twentynine Palms, California, and 20 miles (32 km) north of Joshua Tree National Park. It is managed by the Bureau of Land Management.

Named for the dry lakes found at the center of the wilderness area, this area has a variety of natural resources. The east portion is mountainous while the west portion is a vast alluvial fan and bajada. Elevations range from 1,400 feet (430 m) at the desert floor to the rugged Bullion Mountains, which rise more than 4,100 feet (1,200 m) across a 4-mile (6.4 km) stretch.

== Natural history ==
Wildlife includes Desert bighorn sheep on the slopes, and desert tortoise in the valley floor and bajada habitats.

Native plants include: Barrel cactus, and Smoke trees (Psorothamnus spinosus)" in some bajadas. The Cleghorn Lakes offer occasional spring wildflower displays. The Crucifixion Thorn (Castela emoryi) shrub has been found near the eastern edge of the wilderness boundary. It is native to California, Arizona, and Sonora state in Mexico. It listed by the California Native Plant Society as rare in California, but is more common elsewhere in the lower Sonoran Deserts.

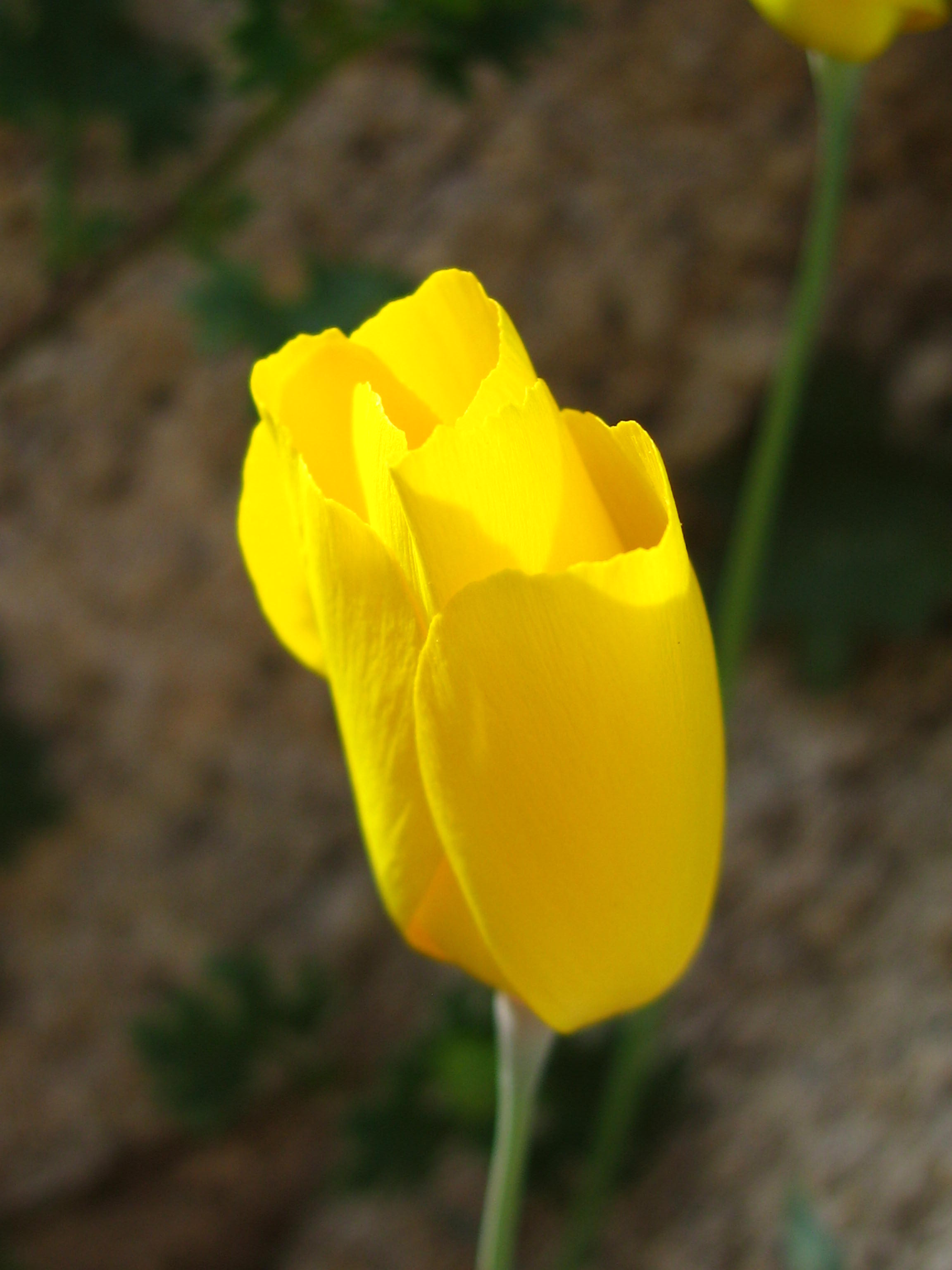
Native Parish's poppy (Eschscholzia parishii) flowering in the preserve

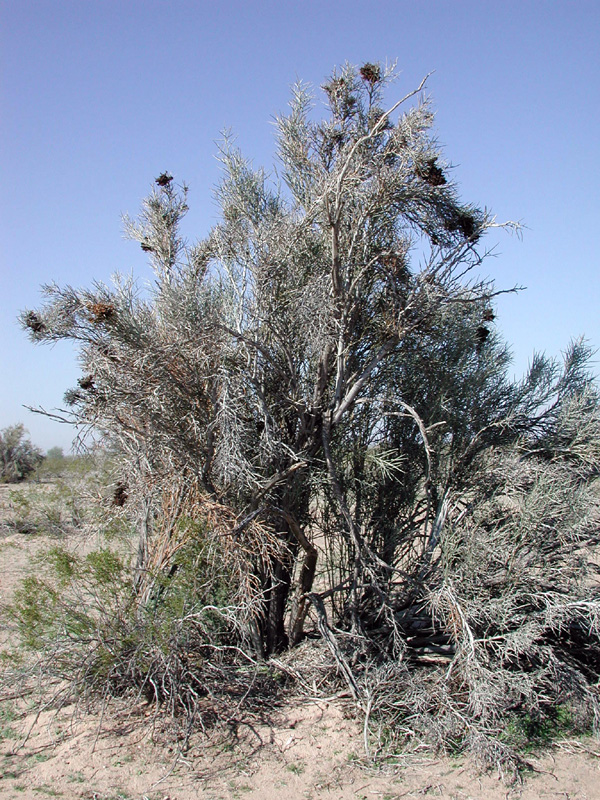
Large rare Crucifixion Thorn (Castela emoryi) shrub

== See also ==
- Flora of the California desert regions
- Natural history of the Mojave Desert
- Protected areas of the Mojave Desert
