= George Cleghorn (Scottish physician) =

Scottish physician (1716–1789)

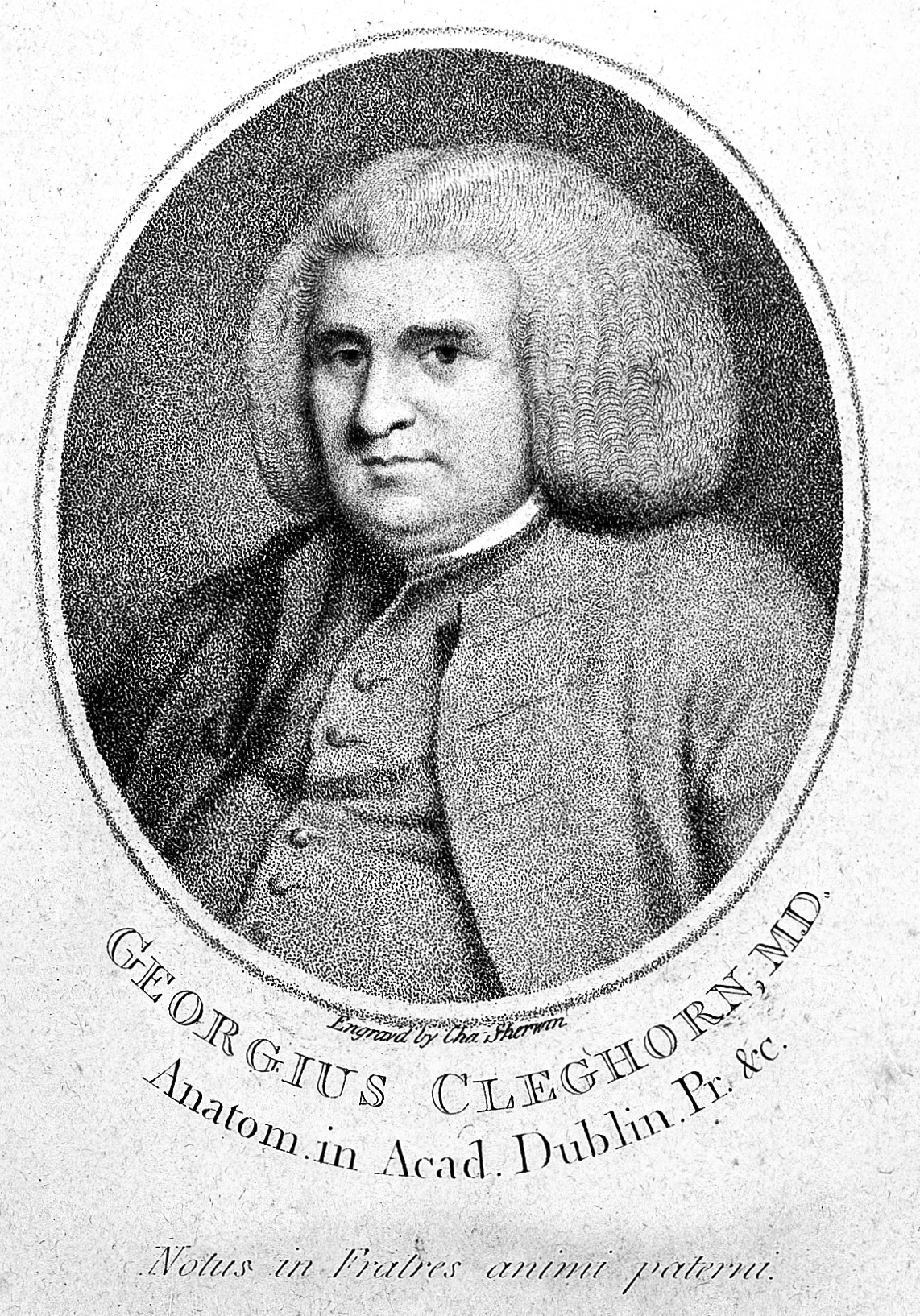
Engraved portrait of Cleghorn

George Cleghorn (1716 – December 1789) was a Scottish physician. He is now known as a careful and accurate observer of fevers, who was able to clarify ways in which malaria complicated the way they presented.

== Life ==
Born the son of a farmer near Granton, in north Edinburgh, on 18 December 1716, Cleghorn was the youngest of five children. He began his education in the grammar school of Cramond, and entered the University of Edinburgh as a student of physic under Alexander Monro in 1731, living in his house. In the same year, when John Fothergill went to Edinburgh, he met Cleghorn and they became friends and correspondents for life.

In 1736 Cleghorn was appointed surgeon to the 22nd Regiment of Foot, then stationed in Menorca (historically called "Minorca" by the British), and he remained on the island till it was ordered to Dublin in 1749. While Cleghorn was in London in 1750 he attended the anatomical lectures of William Hunter.

Cleghorn settled in Dublin in 1751, and began to give lectures in anatomy, and a few years later was made first lecturer on anatomy at Trinity College, Dublin, and then professor. His lectures included both comparative and surgical anatomy and the general principles of physiology.

Successful in practice, Cleghorn in his later years spent much of his time on a small farm he owned, near Dublin. He was one of the original members of the Royal Irish Academy. He died in December 1789.

== Works ==
Cleghorn's major work was Observations on the Epidemical Diseases in Minorca from the year 1744 to 1749 (1751). Having corresponded in with Fothergill on his medical observations in Menorca, Cleghorn was persuaded to write up the contents of his letters. There are seven chapters of original observations on the diseases of the inhabitants and of the British troops. Cleghorn had made many post-mortem examinations.

Unexplained statements in the Hippocratic writings, Cleghorn argued, become clear in the light of clinical observations on the Mediterranean coasts, and the context that diseases, both acute and chronic, are there often modified by malarial fever. The pathology of enteric fever and acute pneumonia was unknown of at the time, but the book gives an account of the course of enteric fever complicated with tertian ague, with dysentery, and with pneumonia. His own misconceptions did not seriously cloud what he observed at the bedside. Four editions were published during the author's lifetime, and a fifth with some alterations in 1815.

== Family ==
Cleghorn had no children of his own, but brought up the nine children of a deceased brother. One of them, William Cleghorn, took the degree of M.D. at Edinburgh in 1779, and published a thesis on the theory of fire, but died a few years after his graduation.
