= Newcassel Props =

Song performed by William Oliver

Song by William Oliver
- Language: English (Geordie)
- Lyricist(s): William Oliver

Newcassel Props is a famous Geordie folk song written in the 19th century by William Oliver, in a style deriving from music hall.

This song pays homage to the passing of several local characters, with a small part dedicated to those still living.

== Lyrics ==
THE NEWCASSEL PROPS
Tune—"The Bold Dragoon"

Oh, waes me for wor canny toon,
It canna stand it lang --
The props are tumbling one by one,
The beeldin seun mun gan;
For Deeth o' lat hez no been blate,
But sent some jovial souls a joggin'
Aw never griev'd for Jacky Tate,
Nor even little Archy Loggan.

But when maw lugs was 'lectrified
Wiv Judy Downey's deeth,
Alang wi' Heufy Scott aw cried,
Till beyth was oot o' breeth;
For greet an' sma', fishwives an' a',
Luik' up tiv her wi' veneration --
If Judy's in the Courts above,
Then for au'd Nick there'll be ne 'cation.

Next Captain Starkey teuk his stick,
And myed his final bow;
Aw wonder if he is scribbling yet,
Or what he's efter noo --
Or if he's drinking jills o' yell,
Or asking pennies to buy backy --
If not allow'd where Starkey's gyen,
Aw'm sure that he'll be quite unhappy.

Jack Coxon iv a trot went off,
One morning very suen --
Cull Billy said, he'd better stop,
But deeth cried, Jackey, come!
Oh, few like him could lift their heels,
Or tell what halls were in the county,
Like mony a proud, black-coated chield,
Jack lived upon the parish bounty.

But cheer up lads, and dinna droop,
Blind Willy's to the fore,
The blythest iv the motley groop,
And fairly worth the score;
O weel aw like to hear him sing,
'Bout aud Sir Mat, an' Dr. Brummel --
If he but lives to see the King,
There is nyen of Willy's friends need grummel.

Cull Billy, tee, wor lugs to bliss,
Wiv news about t'other warld,
Aw move that when wor Vicar dees,
The place for him be arl'd;
For aw really think, wiv half his wit,
He'd myek a reet good pulpit knocker,
Aw'll tell ye where the birth wad fit --
He sugs sae close the parish copper.

Another chep, and then aw's duen, --
He bangs the others far:
Yor mavies wonderin whe aw mean --
Ye gowks, it's Tommy C—r!
When lodgin's scarce just speak to him,
Yor hapless case he'll surely pity,
He'll 'sist upon you gannin' in,
To sup with S—tt, and see the Kitty.

=== Places and people mentioned ===
- Wor canny toon is Newcastle upon Tyne
- Little Archy may be the character Archibald Henderson, a famous and well-liked character of Newcastle, known for his strong attachments to his mother.
- Judy Downey (alias Aud Judy), one of the "Newcassel Worthies"
- Heufy Scott – referred to as "Euphy Scott" in the song "Blind Willie Singin" by Robert Gilchrist
- Au'd Nick (alias "the De'il") is the Devil
- Captain Starkey was plain Benjamin Starkey, no-one knew where "captain" came from, not even Starkey himself. He was an inhabitant of the Freeman's Hospital in Newcastle-Upon-tyne. He was diminutive, and showed excessive good breeding and always thought others craved for his "good" company. He died on 9 July 1822, in his 65th year.
- Jack Coxon another of the "Newcassel Worthies"
- Cull Billy (alias Silly Billy) or William Scott. A native of Newcastle and only about 4 feet tall. He died in St. John's Poor-house on 31 July 1831
- Blind Willy (or Blind Willie) was William Purvis
- Motley groop is just another word for a Motley crew
- Aud Sir Mat, an' Dr. Brummel – Blind Willy sang of "Dr. Brummel upon the Sandhill, He gov Sir Maffa a pill."
- Tommy C—r – actually Tommy Carr, one who wrote a letter from Asstrilly's Goold Fields, a song by Edward "Ned" Corvan which was sub-titled "Tommy Carr's Letter".
- S—tt, Scott, could be John Scott, 1st Earl of Eldon

The "Newcassel Worthies" was a famous Newcastle oil painting by Henry Perlee Parker, painted around 1817 shows numerous of the eccentric characters supposedly living in the area at the time.
Unfortunately the painting is now lost, but an engraving taken from it by George Armstrong and a print of this (published by E. Charnley, a bookseller in the Bigg Market) in c1820, still exists. Luckily an index was provided and this list (in alphabetical order) is :- Aud (or Awd) Judy, Blind Willie, Bold Archy (or Airchy), Bugle-Nosed Jack, Captain Starkey, Cull (or Cully) Billy, Donald, Doodem Daddum (with his Dog, Timour, added), Hangy (or Hangie), Jacky Coxon, Jenny Ballo, Pussy Willy, Shoe-tie Anty and Whin Bob.

== Comments on variations to the above version ==
NOTE – In the early 19th century, as today, there were cheap books and magazines.
Many of these “chapbooks” were on poor quality paper to a poor standard and with poor quality print. The works were copied with no thoughts of copyright, and the work required very little proof-reading, and what was done was not required to a high standard. Consequently the dialect words of songs varied between editions.
As this was a very popular song, it appeared in numerous editions. The many versions published show considerable, some very minor, variations, mainly in the spelling of the words, and sometimes variations within the same edition. Some of the most common are listed below :-

Generally

about and 'bout
Airchy Loggan and Archy Loggan
an' and and
au'd and aud
baccy, backy and bakky
berth and birth
beyth and byeth
Blind Willie and Blind Willy
chiel, chiel', chield and chief
deun and duen
friends and frinds
gills and jills
goks and gowks
good and gud
griev'd and grieved
groop and group
has and hez
heel and heels
he's and he is
Heufy Scott and Heuffy Scott
hugs and sugs
Jackey Tate and Jacky Tate
lat and late
liv'd and lived
luik' and luik'd
mavies and mevies
nae and ne
never and niver
noo and now
o' and of
oot and out
others, tothers and uthers
pity and pitty
sae and se
scribblin' and scribbling
seun and suen
te, tiv and to
there (and their) and thor
ti and to
varry and very
wi', with and wiv
yor, you and your

The missing names in the last verse are "Carr" and Scott"

== Recordings ==
To follow

== See also ==
- Geordie dialect words
