= William Cleghorn (Newcastle eccentric) =

Mr. William Cleghorn (1777–1860), better known locally as "Billy Conolly" was the last of the old eccentrics of Newcastle.

== Life ==
Mr. William Cleghorn, more generally known as "Billy Conolly" was born c. 1777 in Alnwick, Northumberland. He served his time to be a leather breeches maker, but for many years he led a wandering life, selling the ballads and stories of Cattanach of the Seven Dials, London. (Mr Cattanach was also a native of Alnwick.) He is said to have been the veritable "King of the Beggars" in St. Giles's; and at one time he was kidnapped and carried to France, and exhibited as a dwarf, being very diminutive in stature. He was liberated on complaining of his treatment to some of the authorities of a town who had come to see the English dwarf. In his latter days he earned a livelihood by selling nuts and oranges, and was well patronised by the public. Mr. William Cleghorn died on 9 August 1860 in Alnwick, aged 83.

== See also ==
- Geordie dialect words
