= William Oliver (songwriter) =

Poet, singer and songwriter from Newcastle upon Tyne

- Born: 5 February 1800. The Side, Newcastle upon Tyne, England
- Died: 29 October 1848 (aged 48).
- Occupations: Poet, singer, songwriter

William Oliver (5 February 1800 – 29 October 1848) was a Tyneside poet, singer and songwriter from Newcastle upon Tyne. He is arguably best known for the song "Newcassel Props", an example of the Geordie dialect.

== Early life ==
Oliver was born in The Side, near the Quayside in Newcastle upon Tyne. His father was a cheesemonger and had his own business.

== Career ==
Oliver became a draper and hatter, working for a Mr.Bowes of The Bridge End, Gateshead, where he stayed there for many years. For a short time, he ran his own business as a hatter, but this was unsuccessful. He eventually left the business around 1830 and joined his brother Timothy working in his grocery shop situated at the corner of Cloth Market and High Bridge, and there he stayed until his death.

=== Music ===
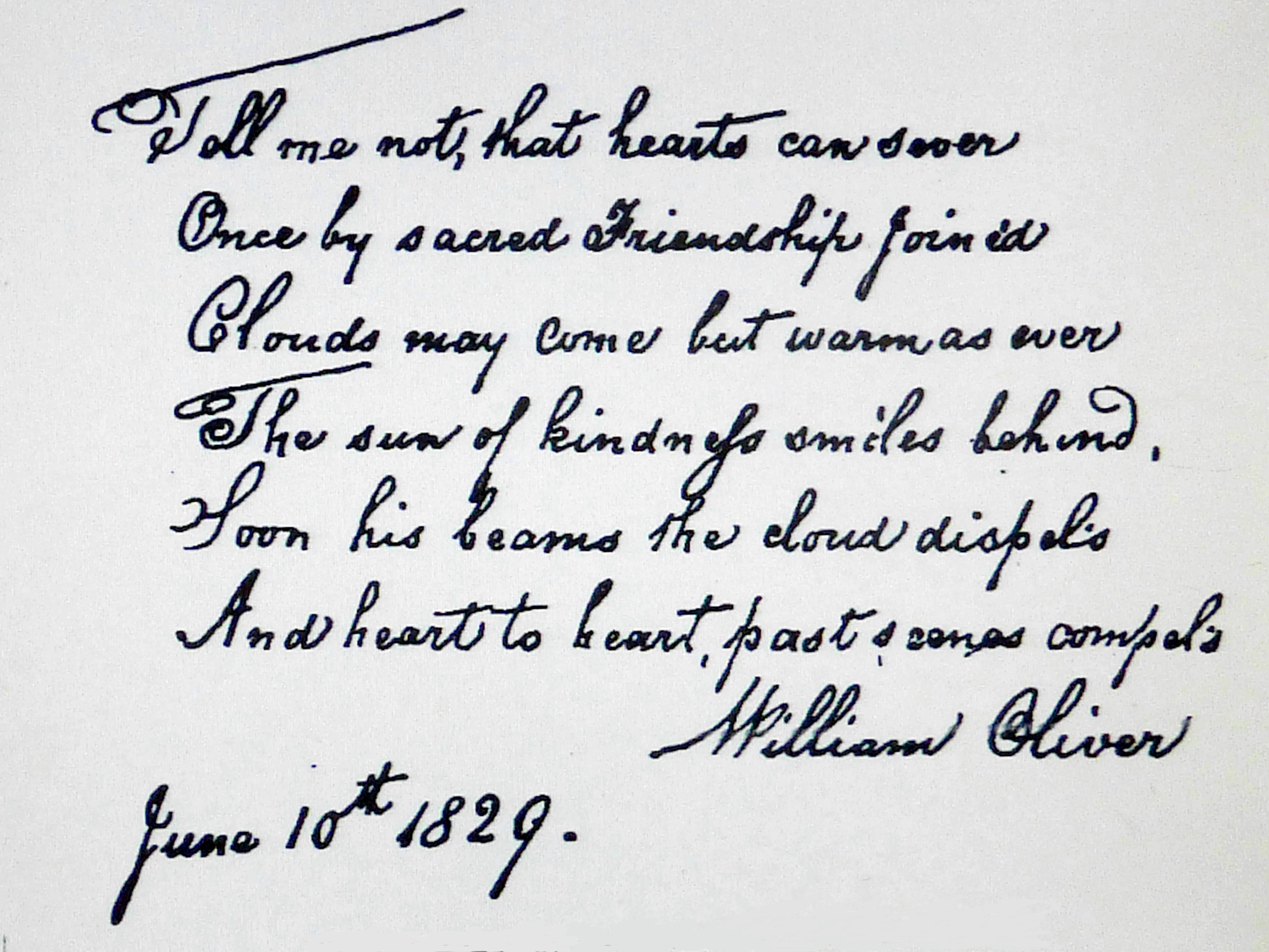
Signed poem by Oliver, 1829

Oliver was popular as both singer and songwriter in his time. His 1829 collection of songs was dedicated to Robert Bill, Mayor of Newcastle upon Tyne.

== Personal life ==
He was politically motivated, sympathized with the protestors for reforms, and was a keen supporter of the 1832 Reform Bill. Oliver was also a member of several of the reformist societies, such as Sons of Apollo, Stars of Friendship, and the Corinthian Society (that held its meetings at the Blue Posts, Pilgrim Street, Newcastle upon Tyne).

William Oliver, like his brother Timothy, was unmarried. He died on 29 or 30 October 1848 aged 48, and was buried in Westgate Hill General Cemetery, Arthur's Hill, Newcastle upon Tyne. The Newcastle Courant described him as "much respected".

== Works ==
His works include:

- "The Bonassus" – the tale of a buffalo in a wild animal show; to the tune of "Jemmy Joneson's Whurry"
- "The Clock Face" – to the tune "Bold Dragoon"
- "England Awake" – a political song
- "The Lament" – to the tune "The Bold Dragoon"
- "The New Markets" – to the tune "Canny Newcassel"
- "Newcassel Props" – in which we remember the passing of local characters, with a small part dedicated to those still living; this is considered by many to be one of the best of the old Tyneside songs
- "Newcastle Hackney Coaches" – to the tune "The Bold Dragoon"
- "The Newcastle Millers" – about the great prize fight of October 1824 in which Jim Wallace defeated Tom Dunn for a purse of 40 sovereigns; to the tune "The Bold Dragoon"
- "Shields Chain Bridge"
- "Tim Tunbelly" – to the tune "Canny Newcassel"
- "To the Mechanics Institute of Newcastle upon Tyne"
- "Tom Carr and Waller Watson" (or "Tom and Jerry at Home") – to the tune "Bold Dragoon"

== See also ==
- Geordie dialect words
