= Henry Perlee Parker =

English artist (1785–1873)

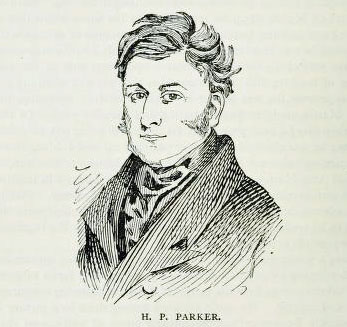
- An uncredited wood engraving of Henry Perlee Parker that was first published in the Newcastle Weekly Chronicle (22 August 1891) to illustrate Richard Welford's biographical account of Parker's life.
- Born: Henry Perlee Parker; 15 March 1795; Devonport, Plymouth, England
- Died: 9 November 1873 (aged 78); Shepherd's Bush, London

Henry Perlee Parker (1785–1873) was an artist who specialised in portrait and genre paintings. He made his mark in Newcastle upon Tyne in the 1820s through patronage by wealthy landowners and through paintings of large-scale events of civic pride. Over a period of forty years his work was exhibited at the Royal Academy and the British Institution in London. Coastal scenes of fisherfolk and smugglers were a popular specialism. Through the distribution and sale of mezzotint prints of subjects such as William and Grace Darling Going to the Rescue of the SS Forfarshire, Parker became one of the north-east's best-known nineteenth-century artists. In Newcastle upon Tyne he was central to the setting-up of a Northern Academy for the Arts. Later, in Sheffield, he taught drawing at the Wesleyan Proprietary Grammar School, and in his later years he lived in Hammersmith, London. He had a large family and was married three times.

== Early life ==
Henry Perlee Parker (1795–1873), portrait and genre painter, was born at Plymouth Dock, Devonport, on 15 March 1795. He was the son of Robert and Mary Elizabeth Parker – the name ‘Perlee’ comes from his paternal grandmother, who was French. His father was a teacher of ‘marine and mechanical drawing’. After leaving school, Henry was considered for training as a tailor, then was employed in a coachbuilder's workshop before he set himself up as a portrait painter. In the early 1810s he accompanied Charles Sandoe Gilbert (1760–1831) on sketching tours of Cornwall and saw paintings in the private collections of noblemen. He became acquainted with smugglers on the Cornish coast.

In 1815 Parker married Amy Morfey, and following a stay with relatives in Sunderland they decided to move to Newcastle upon Tyne as Parker had taken ‘such a liking to that town he resolved to try his fortune there’. With five pounds between them, artist and wife found lodgings. He earned money by teaching drawing, painting window blinds, and executing small portraits on tin. By the autumn of 1816 their first child, Mary Perlee Parker, was born.

== Portraits and Fancy Pictures ==
Newcastle – made wealthy from mining, shipbuilding and engineering – was undergoing a huge expansion of population at this time. Parker was aware of the importance of self-publicity for an artist and the need to ‘network’. He displayed examples of his work in a prominent shop window with the notice: ‘Likenesses done in this style at one guinea each.’ Over the next few years seventy commissions followed, enabling the artist to move to more respectable apartments in Pilgrim Street.

In addition to portraits, Parker produced ‘fancy pictures’ for broker's shops. David Mannings defines ‘fancy pictures’ as being ‘contemporary genre pictures of sentimental realism, in which the artist’s own whimsy played a substantial part'. Parker was a contemporary of David Wilkie (1785–1841), a particularly successful exponent of this type of droll depiction of everyday situations and someone whose work at times provided an inspiration. That Parker’s painting Dead Game was chosen for exhibition at Royal Academy in London in 1817 added to his artistic standing.

== Characters of Newcastle ==
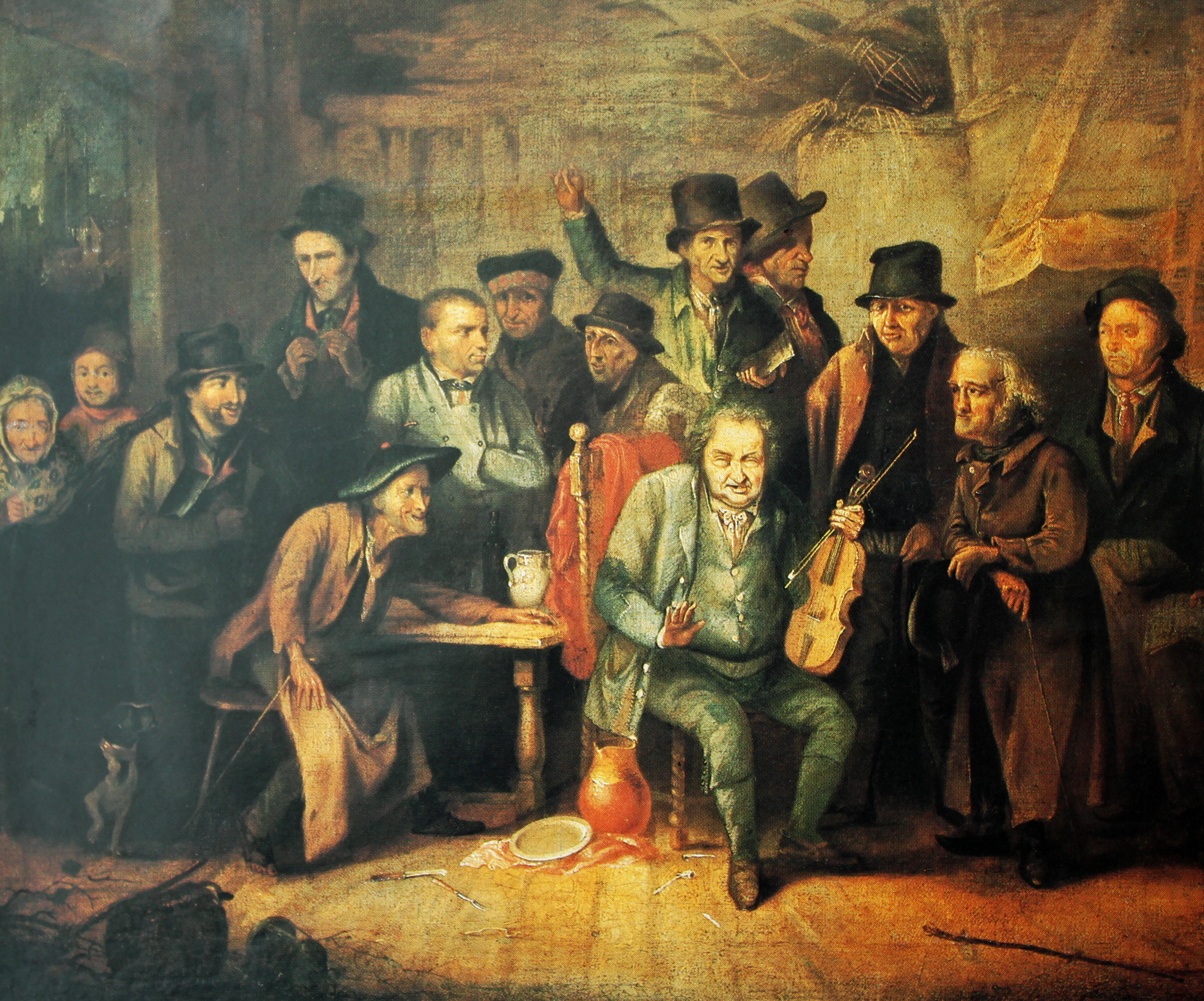
Eccentric Characters of Newcastle by Henry Perlee Parker, c.1817

‘Being a young man of good address and prepossessing appearance and developing a vigorous and taking style of painting figure subjects, Mr. Parker received from the people of Tyneside flattering encouragement and support.' Eccentric Characters of Newcastle (aka Hell’s Kitchen), from about 1817, was one of Parker’s best-known early paintings. It shows fourteen ‘eccentrics’ – locally known characters, mainly paupers from the streets of the Quayside area of Newcastle – assembled in the Flying Horse drinking house. The painting was bought for 20 guineas by Charles John Brandling (1769–1826), an influential landowner and coal magnate.

Newcastle had a reputation for the artistic merit of its book illustration and printing industries, and Parker became acquainted with two exponents: Thomas Bewick (1753–1828) and Thomas Miles Richardson(1784–1848). An engraving by G. Armstrong of Eccentric Characters of Newcastle 'became exceedingly popular'. When Brandling became MP for Northumberland, in 1820, he commission a portrait by Parker that was engraved. Reproductive engraving had a double value in that it brought artwork within the means of the emerging middle classes and it widened the artist's reputation. Brandling commissioned further work over the next few years, and most importantly the relationship gave Parker an entrée into Tyneside society.

== Making a Mark ==
On 19 July 1821 Newcastle's town council – led by the mayor, George Forster – organised a celebration of the coronation of George IV that culminated in the supply of free wine for the populace distributed from a fountain. Parker's large commemorative painting The Sandhill at the Celebration of the Coronation of George IV captured the excitement and mayhem of the event, with local dignitaries being identifiable.

In the following February the painting was selected for exhibition at the British Institution for Promoting the Fine Arts in the United Kingdom (also known as the British Gallery) in Pall Mall, London. While some of the London press commented on Parker's ‘uncultivated style’, it was also seen as being ‘a remarkable picture’ that ‘reminds us of that master of the satirical art, Hogarth'. Parker’s painting had put Newcastle and its corporation on the map, and it was purchased by the mayor and the corporation for 100 guineas.

Parker and Thomas Miles Richardson formed a close friendship, and in response to the absence of public exhibiting space in Newcastle they planned an annual art exhibition. Drawing from their experience of London exhibiting organisations, it was to be called the Northumberland Institution for the Promotion of the Fine Arts, and in September 1882 the first exhibition was held, in Richardson’s modest studios at Brunswick Place. A committee ‘consisting of twenty artists and connoisseurs’ was established, with Richardson as treasurer and Parker as secretary. One of the ‘connoisseurs’ on the committee was the local naturalist Henry Hewitson, and he commissioned Parker to paint a picture of Hewitson's circle on an expedition, known as The Cullercoats Party. The attractive seaside setting and identifiable documentary details make the work characteristics of Parker's now mature style.

== Broadening His Appeal ==
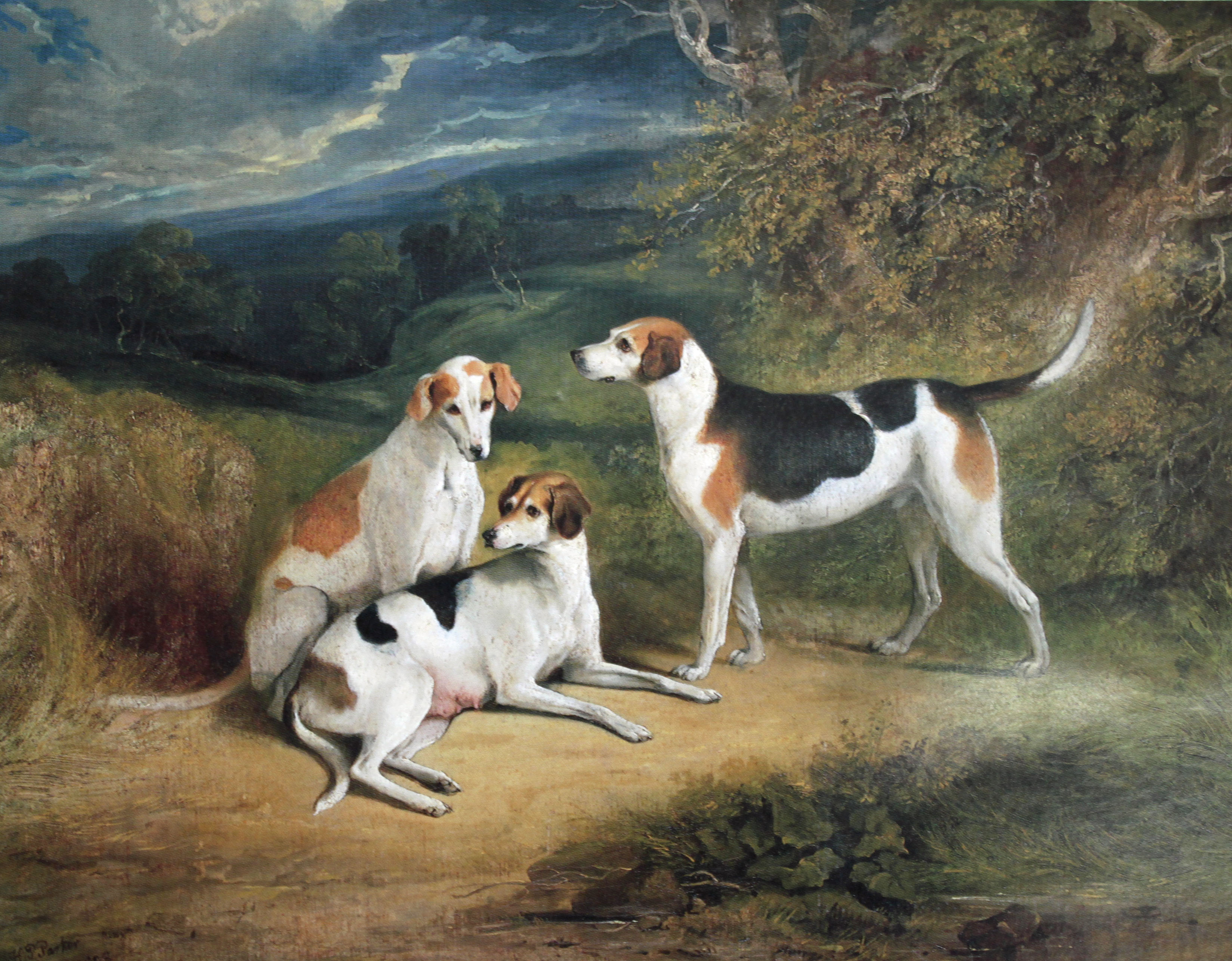
Three Hounds in a Landscape by Henry Perlee Parker, 1828. Commissioned by William Harry Vane(1766–1842), 3rd Earl of Darlington and 1st Duke of Cleveland.

While paintings of local subjects had considerable appeal, there was a danger of such work being considered too parochial. Parker turned to the novels of Walter Scott for inspiration for dramatic incidents. Davie Deans Rejecting the Advice of Saddletree and Butler, drawn from Scott's Heart of Midlothian (first published 1818), was exhibited at the British Institution in 1823, from where it was purchased. Who’s [sic] Turn Next? or Vacant Chair, a whimsical work ‘in the style and manner of Wilkie’, was exhibited at Royal Academy in 1824 – and bought by Brandling. Comparisons with Wilkie were also made in relation to The Village Raffle, exhibited the following year at the British Institution (where purchased by Hewitson).

With an expanding family, Parker's livelihood came from portraiture – human and animal. A dog's head was painted ‘the exact size of life’; short-horned cattle he depicted had won prizes at the Wooler Fair; Whiskey was a favourite pony of the Rev. R. H. Brandling, and T. Cook, Esq. was shown on his favourite hunter.

The Porteus Mob Breaking into the Tolbooth, Edinboro’ was, artistically, Parker's most ambitious work, and contemporary newspaper critiques were highly complementary: ‘Composed, as the picture entirely is, of the gradations of two colours, the effect is most surprising, and the judgement with which the group is arranged, and the beautifully energetic activity which pervades it in every part, are among the triumphs of modern skill’. The Tyne Mercury made comparison with the ‘genius of Rembrandt’ and felt that it was ‘the finest picture ever painted by this industrious and rising artist'. The Porteus Mob … was exhibited at the British Institution in 1826 and at the newly established Scottish Academy in 1827 – yet despite critical success it remained unsold.

== ‘Smuggler Parker’ ==
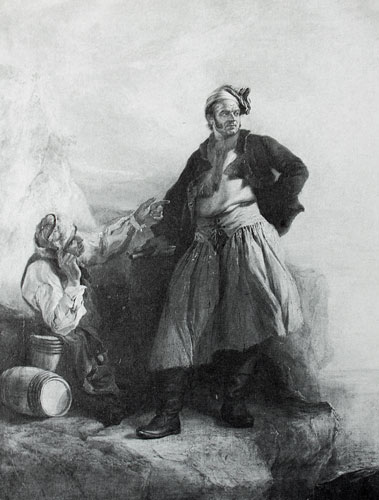
Smugglers Resting by Henry Perlee Parker, 1833.

In 1826 Shipwrecked Smugglers was exhibited at the Royal Academy, where it was purchased by Sir Matthew White Ridley, 3rd Viscount Ridley and MP for Newcastle. Its elements of melodrama, nostalgia and romanticism were careful judged so as not to offend notions of good taste. Parker returned to the similar subject matter regularly over the next thirty years: Smugglers Attacked; Smugglers Alarmed; Smugglers Playing Cards; An Affray with Smugglers; Smugglers Resting and Smugglers Quarrellin'. ‘Smuggler Parker’ became a nickname and a marketing strategy – the paintings sold well. He embraced the role – dressing as a brigand at a fancy-dress ball and telling many stories about smugglers, which ‘greatly delighted the boys in his drawing classes.'

== The Northern Academy of the Arts ==
The Newcastle Exhibitions continued at Brunswick Place until 1827, but sales were poor and there were divisions within the committee. Richardson and Parker attracted some criticism from the committee and the local press because it was believed that 'the pair were not administering their [institution] with the public good in mind. The argument is therefore characterized as one of civic good versus private interest.’ Richardson and Parker decided to speculate their way out of the problem. ‘They bought a plot of land on Blackett Street from Richard Grainger [1797–1861] for £113.10s. and commissioned John Dobson [1787–1865] to design a building suitable not only for the display of paintings but one which could be adapted to the holding of public meetings and concerts. Unknown to them, however, Grainger was building a larger room nearby and called it the "Music Hall" and by doing so deprived Richardson and Perlee Parker of valuable revenue.’

The first of a series of exhibitions was held in June 1828 in what was called the ‘Northern Academy of Arts’ in Blackett Street. With no troublesome committee, Richardson and Parker made all the decisions. They travelled to Edinburgh to select potential exhibits, and in 1829 Parker was elected an honorary member of the newly established Scottish Academy. ‘However, London and provincial artists of note were slow to send works to the Northumberland exhibitions because sale numbers were low.’ Financial losses meant that Richardson and Parker were forced to sell the academy in 1831, carrying over debts amounting to £1,700.

== The Business of Art ==
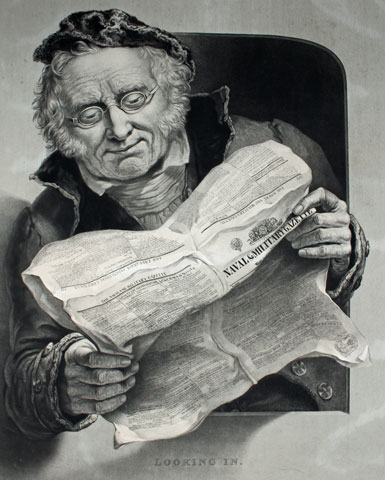
Looking In mezzotint print by William Overend Geller after Henry Perlee Parker. Published by Ackermann's of London, 1837

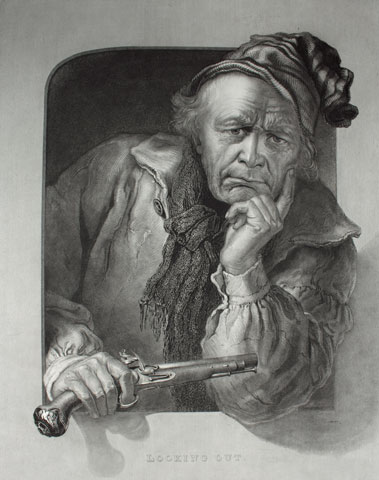
Looking Out mezzotint print by William Overend Geller after Henry Perlee Parker. Published by Ackermann's of London, 1836

Throughout these enterprises Parker remained a prolific portrait painter with an eye to maximising his income. Brandling's successor as MP for Northumberland, Matthew Bell (1793–1871), commissioned a portrait: ‘The picture is to be engraved by subscription, and will afford many of the friends of Mr. Bell an opportunity of paying a compliment to the local usefulness and private worth of the individual, by placing their names on the list which hangs beside the painting.’ In March 1832 the mayoress of Newcastle gave a grand ball and supper to mark the coronation of William IV. This came ‘from a laudable desire to serve the tradesmen who had all suffered in some degree from the previous visitation (cholera) it was resolved that this should be a fancy, as well as a dress ball … There were between 500 and 600 persons present … Mr. Henry Perlee Parker, artist of Newcastle, is at present engaged in painting a picture of this grand fancy dress ball.’ The painting was purchased by the mayor. A portrait of Reverend Robert Morrison (1782–1834), the first Christian Protestant missionary in China, was presented to the Literary and Philosophical Society of Newcastle upon Tyne in 1833.

Sales of mezzotint prints of Parker's work became increasing important to his finances, and in 1833, Danger was his first painting to be purchased by Ackermann's of London for reproduction and publishing. Ackermann's print shop in Regent Street, London, was advertised as having "the largest collection of exhibition prints and of London always on view: from 1s. to 21s. plain and coloured". As publishers, Ackermann's were leaders in the field of selling multi-coloured lithographic images.' Perhaps through the influence of Ackermann's, Parker would start to appreciate the importance of a good title – Looking Out (‘a resolute smuggler, leaning out of a porthole’) and Looking In (‘a weather-beaten sailor, in a similar position, reading the Naval Gazette) would become two of his best-known Ackermann prints. The Banquet Given on the Occasion of the Opening of the Grainger Market, Newcastle upon Tyne, 1835 was another large commemorative picture containing many portraits of local dignitaries, such as John Dobson, Richard Grainger, John Clayton (the town clerk) and John L. Hood (the mayor).

== Critiques and Working Methods ==
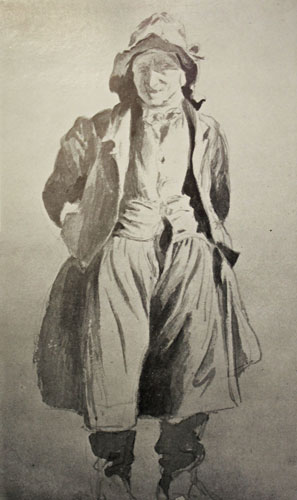
Fisherman, an undated watercolour study 'from Nature'.

With debts from the Northern Academy affair outstanding and a large family to support, Parker resorted to further self-publicity. Critiques on Paintings by H.P. Parker was published by Parker in 1835. It is a compendium of newspaper reviews of 67 of Parker’s paintings and 48 portraits. It includes ‘slight etchings’ to serve as an aide-memoire or an introduction to the compositions. With eighteen oil paintings unsold, Parker explains his hope that the book will interest new patronage as ‘many of his early patrons [have been] removed by death and other circumstances.’

Pitmen at Play, shown at the Royal Academy in 1836, proved popular and led to other ‘at play’ subjects. It has been noted that Thomas Gainsborough’s ‘beggar children and humble families at work or at play outside tumbledown Picturesque cottages … were not meant as criticisms of social conditions; the whole intention was to move the beholder’s affections.’ Similarly, while the social import of Parker displaying ‘pitmen’ at the Royal Academy is itself of note, ultimately their function was to please and entertain the spectator.

Parker recognised the importance of drawing as the foundation of picture-making, and at various times in his life he had drawing pupils. In the late 1830s he was teaching drawing at the Bruce Academy, Percy Street, Newcastle upon Tyne. Parker usually started with making watercolour sketches ‘from Nature’, then assembling the elements into the final composition. His father was often called upon to model the head of a smuggler or a seventeenth-century ‘Covenanter’.

== A Rescue … ==
After the demise of the Northern Academy, Richardson and Parker were no longer on good terms – with debts and an absence of patrons, Parker was at a low point. However, he had ‘the happy business knack of seizing upon some stirring event, and fixing it upon canvas ere the interest faded and the excitement died out’. In September 1838 the wrecking of the steamship Forfarshire off the Northumberland coast with the loss of 62 lives and a heroic rescue of five of the nine survivors by lighthouseman William Brook Darling and his daughter Grace Horsley Darling became a national sensation. Parker saw a commercial opportunity and enlisted the talents of his friend John Wilson Carmichael (1800–1868) – an artist specialising in marine subjects – to work collaboratively on a painting that was to be known as William and Grace Darling Going to the Rescue of the SS Forfarshire. They paid four fishermen to row them to the Longstone Lighthouse, the home of the Darlings. Carmichael was taken beyond the lighthouse to sketch the wreckage, while Parker stayed for most of a week making watercolour studies and portraits. The project generated press coverage, and Parker supplemented the collaborative painting with two further related paintings. The set were engraved by David Lucas(1802–1881) and became very popular and well known.

== Leaving Newcastle upon Tyne ==
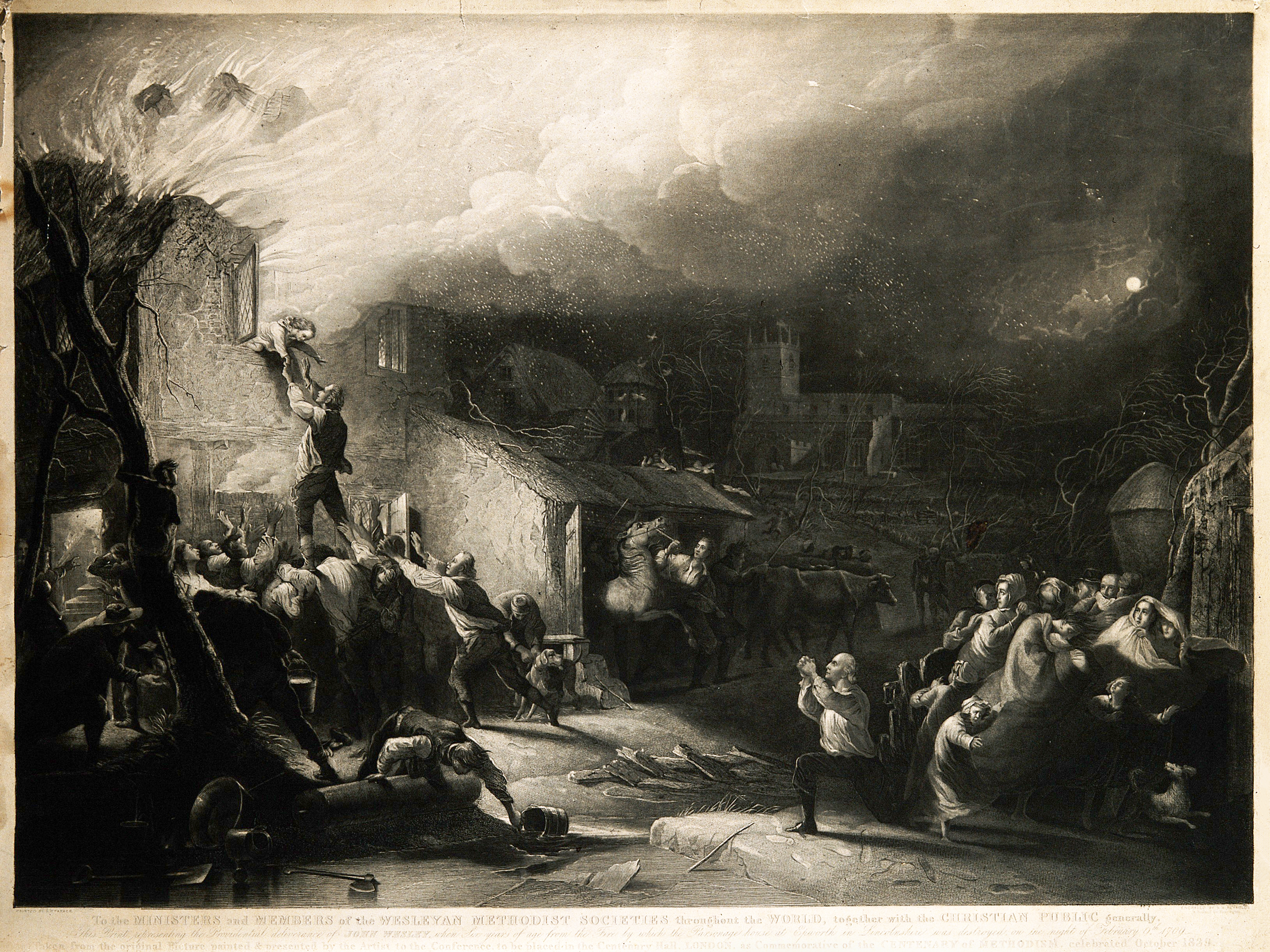
Providential Deliverance of John Wesley when a Child from Fire at Epworth Rectory mezzotint print by S.W. Reynolds after H.P. Parker., 1840

From the mid-1830s Parker was using studio addresses in London for Royal Academy purposes and it is possible that he was already anticipating a move from Newcastle. An opportunity arose through his involvement in Wesleyan Methodism. In 1839 he attended the conference at Liverpool that celebrated 100 years of Methodism. As the annual conference was to be at Newcastle the following year, Parker decided ‘to commemorate the occasion by painting a picture of some striking incident in their history. He consulted the Rev. James Everett, who suggested … the escape of John Wesley from the parsonage at Epworth, when he was a boy.’ After the Newcastle conference Parker sent the picture to the conference president, the Rev. Robert Newton. Samuel William Reynolds II's engraving of The Fire at Epworth Rectory was another widely circulated image.

Parker became aware of a vacancy for a drawing master at the recently opened Wesleyan Proprietary Grammar School, Sheffield. Obtaining the appointment, he left Tyneside by 1841.

== Sheffield ==
The year the family moved to Glossop Road, Sheffield, a new baby, Harriet Perlee Parker, was born. There were then eight children in the Parker family home. Sir Francis Chantrey – the leading portrait sculptor of the Regency era – died in November 1841, and was buried in his birthplace of Norton, Sheffield. Parker painted two commemorative paintings: The Burial of Sir F. Chantrey, in Norton churchyard, Sheffield for the British Institution and Milk Boys – showing Francis Chantrey as a boy going to Sheffield with milk, a donkey and a favourite dog – for the Royal Academy. He also painted various local subjects such as Sheffield Grinders in the Rivelin Valley and View of the town of Sheffield, from the South East (also published as an attractive hand-coloured aquatint) and watercolour studies of the pupils on school outings such as to Beauchief Abbey and Roche Abbey, and supplemented his income with drawing classes in Chesterfield.

Following concerns over the poor quality of design in British manufacturing industries, a Government School of Design had been established in London in 1837. Benjamin Robert Haydon (1786–1846), an artist of great renown (and controversy), was a pioneer in promoting the setting-up of further design schools in regional manufacturing centres where designers, and artisans could study art. While on a lecture tour, Haydon spoke at the Music Hall, Sheffield, and Parker recorded the event in the form of a portrait. In conjunction with the banker and educationalist Dr Benjamin Haywood and a Mr Holland, Parker campaigned for a Sheffield School of Design, which was established in 1843. However, ‘[Parker] had indulged a hope that, as a reward of his exertions he might be offered the post of teacher, but the Government sent down a nominee of their own, and ignored his claims to consideration. The disappointment, and the loss of his wife in 1844, unsettled him. Some time afterwards he resigned his connection with Wesley College, and launched himself into the great world of London.’

== A More Measured Life in Hammersmith ==
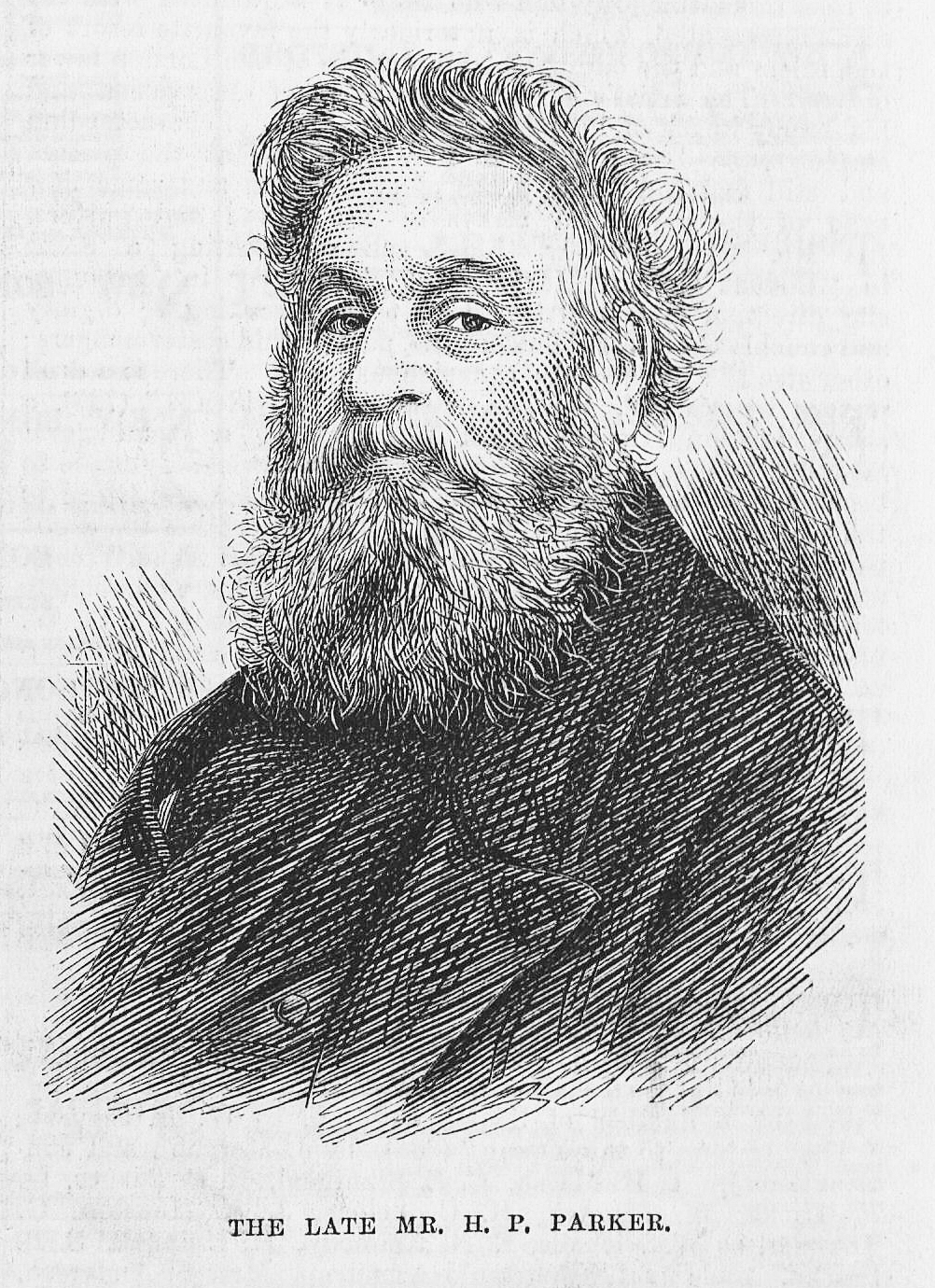
Henry Perlee Parker wood engraving after photograph by Edward Gaubert published alongside an obituary in the Illustrated London News, 23 May 1874.

Understandably, Parker's output diminished over the next few years. Although he kept a London studio address – 42 Newman Street in Fitzrovia – he was still recorded as living in Sheffield and working at the Wesley College as late as 1849. By this date his son Raphael Hyde Parker had followed him into the post of drawing master there.

At the start of the new decade Parker had moved to London permanently – living in Hammersmith. There was a short-lived rally with exhibition paintings along familiar lines – fishermen, smugglers and gypsies. For the first time he exhibited in Dublin, and untypically included a few watercolour drawings. Halt – Smugglers was reproduced in the Illustrated London News.

By March 1851 Parker had taken a second wife, Mary Anne, who was twenty years his junior.

In contrast to the exuberance of Parker's Newcastle days, he now led a much more measured life. No portraits were being commissioned; there were no loyal patrons or drawing classes. His income depended mainly on the sale of prints – engravings struck in his heyday. Fresh Fish and Lobster Sauce was Parker's last work shown at the Royal Academy, in 1859, but he continued to produce occasional exhibition works until the mid-1860s.

Watercolour sketches record occasional seaside holidays – in Margate, Cornwall, the Isle of Man and Boulogne – but there are family bereavements and upsets. In 1866 Parker's second wife died. A year later he married for the third time, but once again he outlived his wife, who died in 1872. The couple had been living in Shepherd's Bush.

On 9 November 1873 Henry Perlee Parker himself died, aged 78. It has been stated that he 'died in poverty in London', and this was supported by Nerys Johnson's biographical notes for the catalogue of the Henry Perlee Parker exhibition at the Laing Art Gallery, Newcastle, in 1969: ‘Died penniless … Among the possessions passed on to his son Raphael were paintings, watercolours and a copy of Reynolds Discourses published in 1831.’ He seems to have lived the second half of his life on the income generated in the first half, so it would not be surprising that his money was running out. However, as well as having a live-in housekeeper to the end of his life, the probate value of his estate was stated as ‘no more than £8000’ – so he was not ‘penniless’. A brief obituary in the Illustrated London News of 23 May 1874 was illustrated with an engraving based on a photograph of the artist by Edward Gaubert.
