= List of settlements in Tyne and Wear by population =

The 7 largest settlements of the county of Tyne and Wear, with cities in bold, district centres in yellow, and key towns and areas shown in white.
The 8th to 22nd largest settlements of the county of Tyne and Wear.

This is a list of settlements in Tyne and Wear by population based on the results of the 2011 census. The next United Kingdom census will take place in 2021. In 2011, there were 22 built-up area subdivisions with 5,000 or more inhabitants in Tyne and Wear, shown in the table below.

== Administrative boundaries ==
Table taken from the Tyne and Wear - Settlements section:

#	Administrative centre	Other places
1	Borough of Gateshead (Gateshead)	Blaydon, Low Fell, Rowlands Gill, Ryton, Sheriff Hill, Whickham
2	Newcastle upon Tyne (Newcastle City Centre)	Byker, Gosforth, Kenton, Blakelaw, Fenham, Elswick, Newburn, Walbottle, Westerhope, Jesmond, West Moor, Heaton, Throckley, Walker
3	North Tyneside (Wallsend)	Annitsford, Backworth, Benton, Cullercoats, Dudley, Earsdon, Forest Hall, Killingworth, Longbenton, Monkseaton, Preston, Tynemouth, Whitley Bay, Wideopen
4	South Tyneside (South Shields)	Boldon, Cleadon, Harton, Hebburn, Jarrow, Monkton, Westoe, Whitburn
5	City of Sunderland (Sunderland City Centre)	Castletown, Fencehouses, Fulwell, Hendon, Herrington, Hetton-le-Hole, Houghton-le-Spring, Hylton Red House, Newbottle, Penshaw, Rainton, Ryhope, Seaburn, Silksworth, Shiney Row, South Hylton, Southwick, Springwell, Washington, Warden Law

== Population ranking ==
#	Settlement	Population		Outlying settlements
#	Settlement	2001	2011	Outlying settlements
1	Newcastle upon Tyne	247,710	268,064	Excludes Newburn, Wallbottle
2	Sunderland	177,740	174,286	Whitburn counted separately
3	Gateshead	113,220	120,046	Excludes Springwell
4	South Shields	78,170	75,337	Includes Biddick Hall, Brockley Whins, Cleadon Park, Marsden, West Harton, Whiteleas. Cleadon counted separately
5	Tynemouth	62,880	67,519	Includes North Shields, Shiremoor. Excludes Backworth
6	Washington	67,500	67,085	Includes Concord, New Herrington, Oxclose, Rickleton, Shiney Row, Sulgrave. Excludes Birtley, Bournmoor, Newbottle, Springwell
7	Wallsend	42,580	43,826	Includes Battle Hill, Howdon
8	Jarrow	44,668	43,431	Includes East Boldon, Fellgate, Monkton, Simonside
9	Longbenton	34,120	37,070	Includes Camperdown, Holystone, Killingworth
10	Whitley Bay	36,544	36,702	Includes Monkseaton
11	Hebburn	19,300	19,148	Includes Campbell Park
12	Whickham	16,260	16,652	Blaydon counted below. Excludes Dunston, Sunniside, Winlaton Mill
13	Ryton	15,742	15,999	Includes Crawcrook, Greenside, Stella Park
14	Blaydon	14,648	15,155	Includes Winlaton. Excludes Blaydon Burn
15	Houghton-le-Spring	15,013	13,863	Includes Burnside, Coptleigh, Newbottle, Rainton Bridge. Excludes East Rainton
16	Hetton-le-Hole	12,815	12,127	Includes Easington Lane, Moorsley
17	Wideopen	8,930	8,976	Includes Brunswick, Hazlerigg, Seaton Burn
18	Fence Houses	5,830	6,649	Includes Chilton Moor, High Dubmire, Woodstone Village
19	Rowlands Gill	5,995	6,096	Includes Highfields, Lockhaugh. Excludes High Spen
20	Throckley	5,588	5,507	Excludes Heddon-on-the-Wall, Newburn, Wallbottle
21	Annitsford	5,486	5,497	Includes Dudley, Fordley
22	Whitburn	5,235	5,102	Excludes Seaburn
23	Cleadon	4,795	4,508	

== See also ==
- Tyne and Wear
- Tyneside
- Wearside
- List of urban areas in the United Kingdom
