= Robert Peat =

Anglican cleric (1772–1837)

The Reverend, Sir Robert Peat
- Born: c. 1772; Hamsterley, County Durham, England
- Died: 20 April 1837 (aged 65); New Brentford, Middlesex
- Education: Trinity College, Cambridge
- Spouse: Jane Smith (c.1751-1842)
- Parent(s): John Peat (died 1805) and Anne Heron (died 1778)
- Church: Church of England
- Ordained: 1794
- Offices held: Curate of Biggleswade (1794-1797); Perpetual curate of Chelmorton (1798-1803); Perpetual curate of Buxton (1803-1808); Rector of Ashley cum Silverley and Vicar of Kirtling (1803-1805); Perpetual curate of New Brentford (1808-1837); Grand Prior of the Order of St John (1831-1837)

Notes
- Offices held from The Clergy Database, Person: Peat, Robert (1793 - 1815) The Clergy Database

Sir Robert Peat (c. 1772 – 20 April 1837) was an Anglican cleric and, according to some sources, the first Grand Prior of the revived English langue of the Order of Saint John.

== Early life ==
Peat was born in Hamsterley, County Durham, England, the son of John Peat (died 1805), a watchmaker and silversmith, and Anne Heron (died 1778), of the Herons of Chipchase Castle. He was admitted to Trinity College, Cambridge as a ten-year man on 20 April 1790 and later received a Doctor of Divinity degree from the University of Glasgow in 1799.

On 21 November 1790, Peat was appointed to the Order of Saint Stanislaus by the King of Poland. His obituary says that he was appointed for services rendered to that king by a relative of Peat and his entry in the British Herald says that this was in connection to land willed to him by a John Vesey of Warsaw. Peat's house was broken into on 25 October 1808 and papers relating to his Polish estates were reported stolen.

In 1804, Peat was permitted by King George III to accept and wear the order's insignias. Appearing in court in 1808 after being attacked outside of the Drury Lane theatre, the defence objected to calling Peat "Sir" as he had not been appointed to any order of knighthood in the United Kingdom. However, the Lord Chief Justice, presiding, stated that knighthood was a "universal honour" and thus the appellation applied to him.

On 8 August 1816 he was admitted as a joining member of The Sea Captain’s Lodge, which later became Palatine Lodge No. 97, in Sunderland, having transferred from Felicity Lodge in London. On 14 November 1816 he was unanimously elected by the members to be the Worshipful Master of the Lodge but due to his absence was not installed as Worshipful Master.

Peat had also been a military chaplain in the Peninsular War. He was appointed a steward of Queen Charlotte's Lying-In Hospital in 1817, elected a fellow of the Medico-Botanical Society of London in 1830 and had officiated at the marriage of the author Lucy Clementina Davies to Francis Henry Davies at St Marylebone Parish Church in 1823.

== Marriage and royal connections ==
William Reid Clanny introduced Peat to the elderly and Catholic, Jane Smith (c. 1751-1842), a kinswoman of Maria Fitzherbert. Jane had been the sole heiress to the County Durham estates of her father and lived at Herrington House, East Herrington, near Sunderland. She was wealthy but is also described as eccentric, a miser and a kleptomaniac.

Peat had been appointed as one of the many chaplains to the Prince Regent in 1800. He wrote to the Private Secretary in 1813 requesting an audience with the prince as he had never met him. Herrington Heritage suggests Peat was supportive of a match with Jane in order to use her relationship (albeit distant) to the prince's unofficial wife, to further advance himself in royal favour. The source also suggests that Jane was taken with the idea of a title if she were to marry Peat.

Whatever their reasons, the couple were married on 6 November 1815 at St Michael's Church, Houghton-le-Spring. Peat had tried to introduce his wife to fashionable society in London, but as she was seemingly unfit for it, he returned her to Sunderland. He lived apart from her at his vicarage in New Brentford and visited her just once a year.

Peat's other royal connections included being mentioned by Mary Anne Clarke (the mistress of the Duke of York) at her public enquiry, as having attended the theatre with her one night, but he was not involved any further in the case. Peat was one of the stewards of the 49th birthday celebrations of the Duke of Kent at Fishmongers' Hall in 1816, but did not attend in person. He was also Deputy Grand Chaplain of the Orange Order and present at a meeting alongside the Duke of Cumberland.

== Death and legacy ==
Peat died at the vicarage of St Lawrence's in New Brentford on 20 April 1837, aged 65, and his library was sold at Sotheby's on 23 and 24 June. On hearing the news, his wife is said to have "bought a new dress of bright yellow cotton, and a bonnet, a feather, and ribbons to match" and walked the streets of Sunderland celebrating his death. She died in 1842, aged either 91 or 92.

Samuel Wesley (in a letter to Vincent Novello dated 1824) called Peat "an old Acquaintance, & I may even say Friend of mine. He is the Parson of Brentford, a good Scholar, a very feeling Lover of Music, a Man of superior Manners, & what we think better than all these, his Heart is warm and sincere". The Monthly chronicle of North-country lore and legend describes Peat as "a fine-looking little man, dressed in a coat and waistcoat that might have been made by a Stultz, a white necktie, knee breeches, and white silk stockings. He cut a good figure on horseback, being an expert rider." Moses Aaron Richardson's The Borderer's table book (1846) describes him (from local papers) as "highly distinguished for his accomplished manners and gentle manly bearing, an excellent scholar, and a warm and devoted friend."

However William Benbow's ultra-radical and anti-clericalist pamphlet The crimes of the clergy (1823) accuses him of being "proud, tyrannical, and overbearing", arrogant and a liar.

== Arms ==
Coat of arms of Sir Robert Peat
Crest Out of a ducal coronet or, a heron's head proper Escutcheon Quarterly: 1st and 4th, barry of six, gules and argent; 2nd and 3rd, Gules, three herons argent, a crescent in chief for difference Motto Praemiando incitat (rewarding encourages) Orders The collar and badge of the Order of St Stanislaus

Masonic offices
Preceded by Robert Hutton	Master-Elect of Palatine Lodge, No. 97; 1816-1817	Succeeded by Thomas Hardy
Non-profit organization positions
New title	Grand Prior of the Order of St John; 1831-1837	Succeeded by Sir Henry Dymoke
