= Jane Peat =

English miser, eccentric and kleptomaniac

Jane, Lady Peat
- Born: Jane Smith c.1751
- Died: 26 November 1842; Sunderland, County Durham
- Other name: Jane Smith
- Known for: Miser, eccentric and kleptomaniac
- Spouse: Rev. Sir Robert Peat

Jane, Lady Peat (Note: Her title in some sources is given as "Lady Jane Peat", however her correct form of address is "Jane, Lady Peat" as the wife of a knight, or (as was also customary at the time) "Dame Jane Peat".) (c.1751—26 November 1842) was an English miser, eccentric and kleptomaniac, and the estranged wife of Sir Robert Peat.

Born Jane Smith, the only child of Mathew and Jane Smith (née Taylor), she was baptised at the Jesuit chapel in Durham on 23 April 1751. Her father was a local squire who lived at Herrington House, East Herrington, in Sunderland and was a landowner of estates in County Durham. The family were recusants and distantly related to the Smythe baronets, making Maria Fitzherbert (the mistress of George IV) her kinswoman.

== Miser and thief ==
Little else is known of Jane's early life until she and her father appear in a record of 1786 (she then aged about 35). They travelled home on horseback along a turnpike road and, on arriving at the turnpike gate at West Rainton, argued with the gatekeeper that they had no need to pay the toll, having already passed through it that same morning. Mathew and Jane then rode off. Knowing their story to be untrue, the gatekeeper brought action against them, and the court found they had been in Barnard Castle (25 miles away) for several days. They were fined £10 each (about £1,155 in 2014) for avoiding the toll.

Jane's father died in 1793, and she inherited his estates and the family home of Herrington House. After the Duty on Hair Powder Act was made law in 1795, she was found to have failed to obtain a certificate for the use of her hair powder, summoned to court and fined £40 (about £3,690 in 2014).

Various other stories of her thievery are given, including having been caught stealing a shawl and a grocer keeping her talking by a fire after seeing her put a pound of butter in her pocket, so that it melted and ran down her petticoats.

== Murder and marriage ==
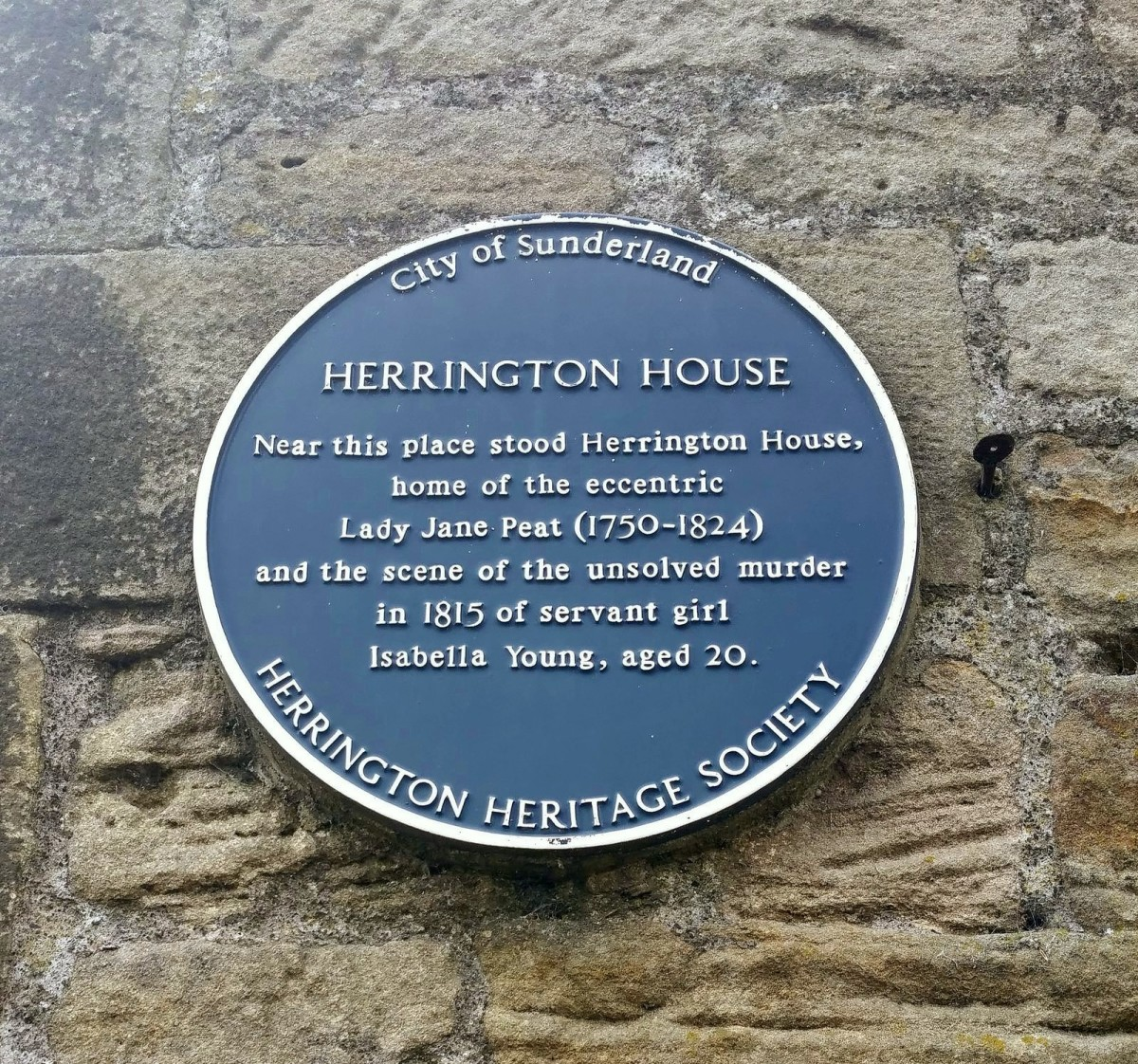
Blue plaque commemorating Herrington House, Lady Peat and her maid (erroneously giving her name as "Lady Jane Peat" and death date of 1824).

The Irish physician and inventor, William Reid Clanny, who had moved to nearby Sunderland, introduced Jane to Sir Robert Peat, a sycophantic chaplain of the Prince Regent. Peat was said to be supportive of a match with Jane to use her relationship (albeit distant) to the prince's unofficial wife, to further advance himself in royal favour and also to repay his gambling debts. Jane was taken with the idea of a title if she were to marry Peat, but was afraid to put her wealth at the disposal of a husband. When Sir Robert proposed to Jane, he was heard to have said that she would never marry as long as Herrington House still stood.

On 17 August 1815, Jane left her home to collect the Lammas rents from her estates near the village of Esh, County Durham. It was arranged for her only servant, Isabella Young, to stay with a neighbour at Herrington until her mistress's return, "to save coal and candle". On 28 August, expecting the latter home that night, Isabella went back to her bed at Herrington House; however Jane did not return. During the night, the house was broken into, set on fire, and Isabella was murdered. On seeing the blaze, neighbours found Isabella lying dead in her nightdress in the front passage. The fire had not yet reached her body, and it was supposed she had been murdered with a poker or other iron object, as she had two large gashes on the back of her head. The house and all its furniture burnt to the ground with only the walls remaining. Isabella's body was laid out on an old box in a tileless shed at the rear of the house and covered in horse cloth. Twenty-year-old Isabella was buried two days later on 30 August at St Michael's Church, Houghton-le-Spring.

When Jane was informed and arrived back at her ruined house, she is said to have raked through the embers, gathering any old nails, hinges, bolts and locks and laid them in a pile to sell for old iron. To save money on lodgings for the night, she is then said to have lain on the old box and covered herself with the horse cloth that once covered her maid.

A few days before the murder, three strangers had been seen lurking about Herrington and were believed to have been the murderers. John Eden, 28, James Wolfe, 56, and his son George Wolfe, 30, were later arrested for the crime but ultimately released with the help of the Quakers.

Sir Robert eventually convinced Jane to marry him, and with the assistance of Jane's advisers, notaries Robert Scurfield and Joseph John Wright, the marriage settlement stipulated that half of her income should be at her own disposal, but Sir Robert secured £1,000 a year for his own private use. The couple was married on 6 November 1815 at St Michael's Church, Houghton-le-Spring; she was aged about 64 and he about 43. Peat had tried to introduce his wife to fashionable society in London, but on finding she had slipped away from the guests and was found talking to the servants in the kitchen, he thought her seemingly unfit for it and returned her to Sunderland. He lived apart from her at his vicarage in New Brentford and visited her just twice a year.

== Death and legacy ==
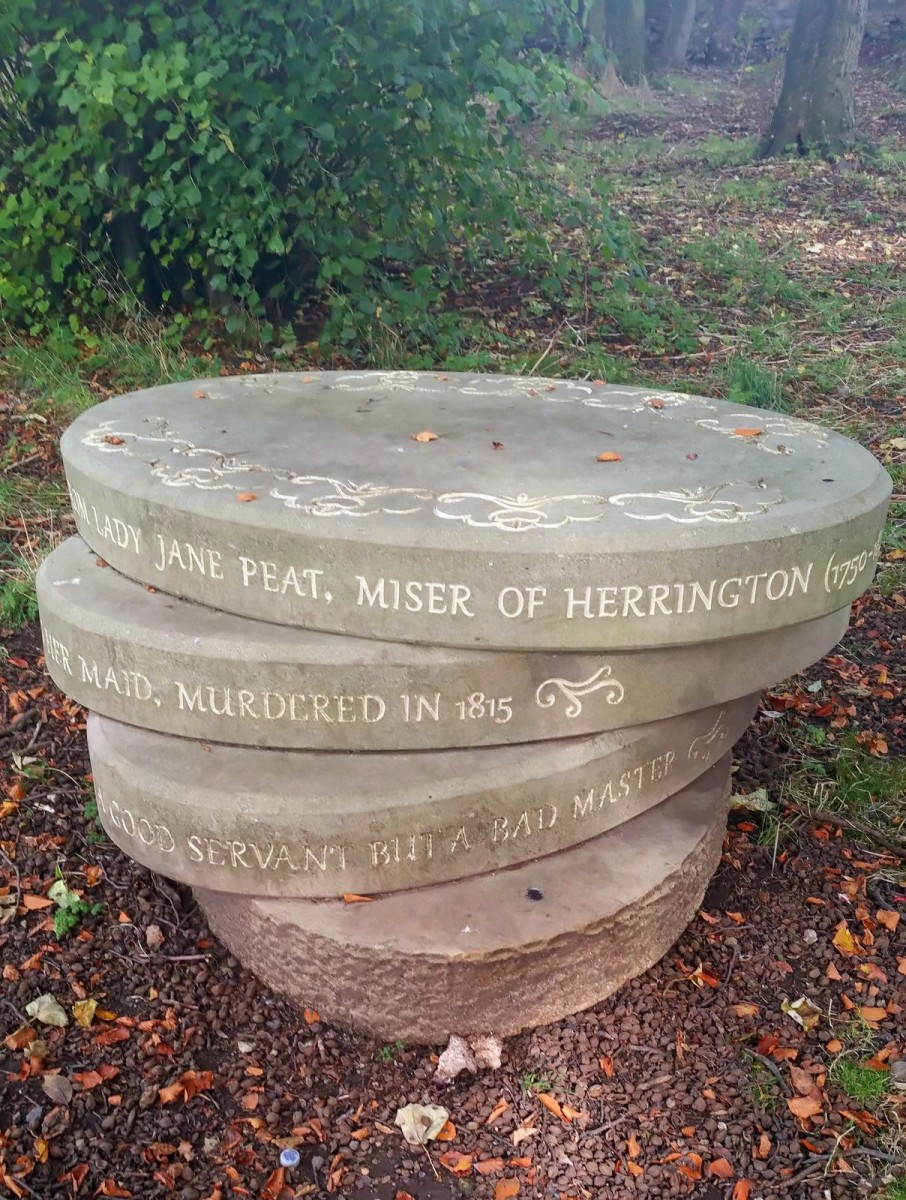
A sculpture representing Jane's hoarding of money and commemorating the murder of her servant girl was installed in Herrington Park in 2009.

Sir Robert died at his vicarage in New Brentford on 20 April 1837, aged 65. On hearing the news, Lady Peat is said to have "bought a new dress of bright yellow cotton, and a bonnet, a feather, and ribbons to match" and walked the streets of Sunderland celebrating his death.

Lady Peat died on 26 November 1842 at Sunderland, aged about 91 or 92. She was buried in the Smith family crypt at St Michael's, Houghton-le-Spring on 1 December. Dying childless, she bequeathed her main estates in County Durham to her godson John Leadbitter of Bird Hill, near Whickham, who received Flass Hall, and her cousin Edward Taylor of Crook, who received Colepike and Hedley Hope. Both added the Smith name to their surnames and quartered their coat of arms with those of Smith in accordance with a clause in her will. Flass Hall had previously been rented by the astronomer-cleric Temple Chevallier, but Leadbitter chose to live there himself once he inherited it, causing Chevallier to have a new parsonage built for himself.

At a meeting of the Society of Antiquaries of Newcastle upon Tyne in 1858, the chairman gave an anecdote of Lady Peat having ridden in the boot of a stagecoach and on inside fare being demanded, she is said to have replied "No; I have come as luggage and must be paid for as luggage."

In 2009 a stone sculpture of four stacked stone discs, representing the hoarding of money, was installed in Herrington Park, near the former site of Herrington House, with the words:

Take heed from Lady Jane Peat, miser of Herrington (1750–1842)

And Isabella Young her maid, murdered in 1815

Money is a good servant but a bad master – a quote attributed to Francis Bacon

Coat of arms of Jane, Lady Peat
Crest A stag lodged argent, semée of estoiles azure attired and gorged with an Eastern crown, the chain reflexed over the back or (Smith) Escutcheon Per pale gules and azure on a chevron engrailed or, between three bezants, each charged with a cross pattée fitchée sable as many crosses pattée fitchée of the last (Smith) Motto Vigilans
