= Thomas Hewitt Key =

English classical scholar (1799–1875)

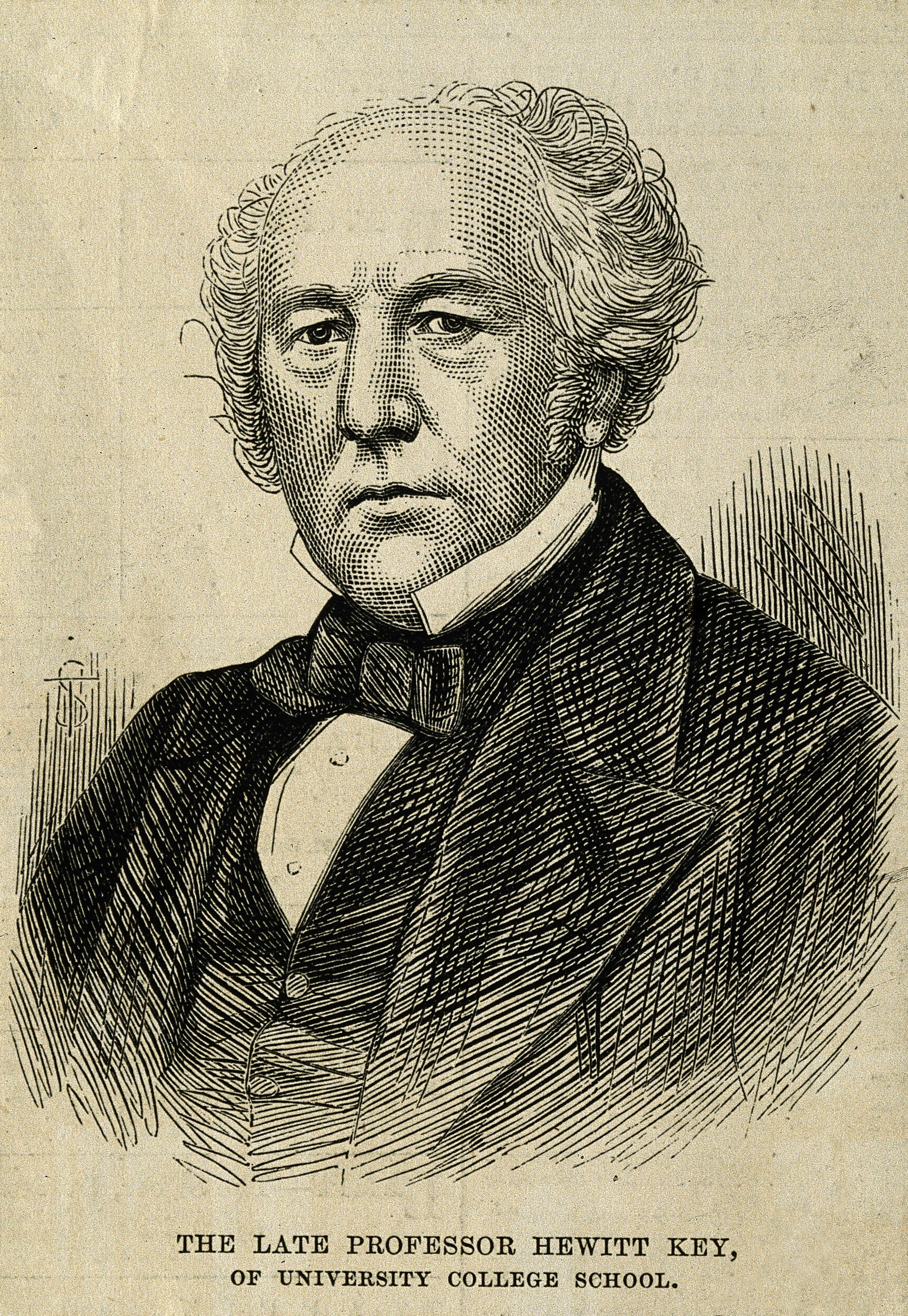
Portrait. Credit: Wellcome Library

Thomas Hewitt Key, FRS (20 March 1799 – 29 November 1875) was an English classical scholar.

== Life ==
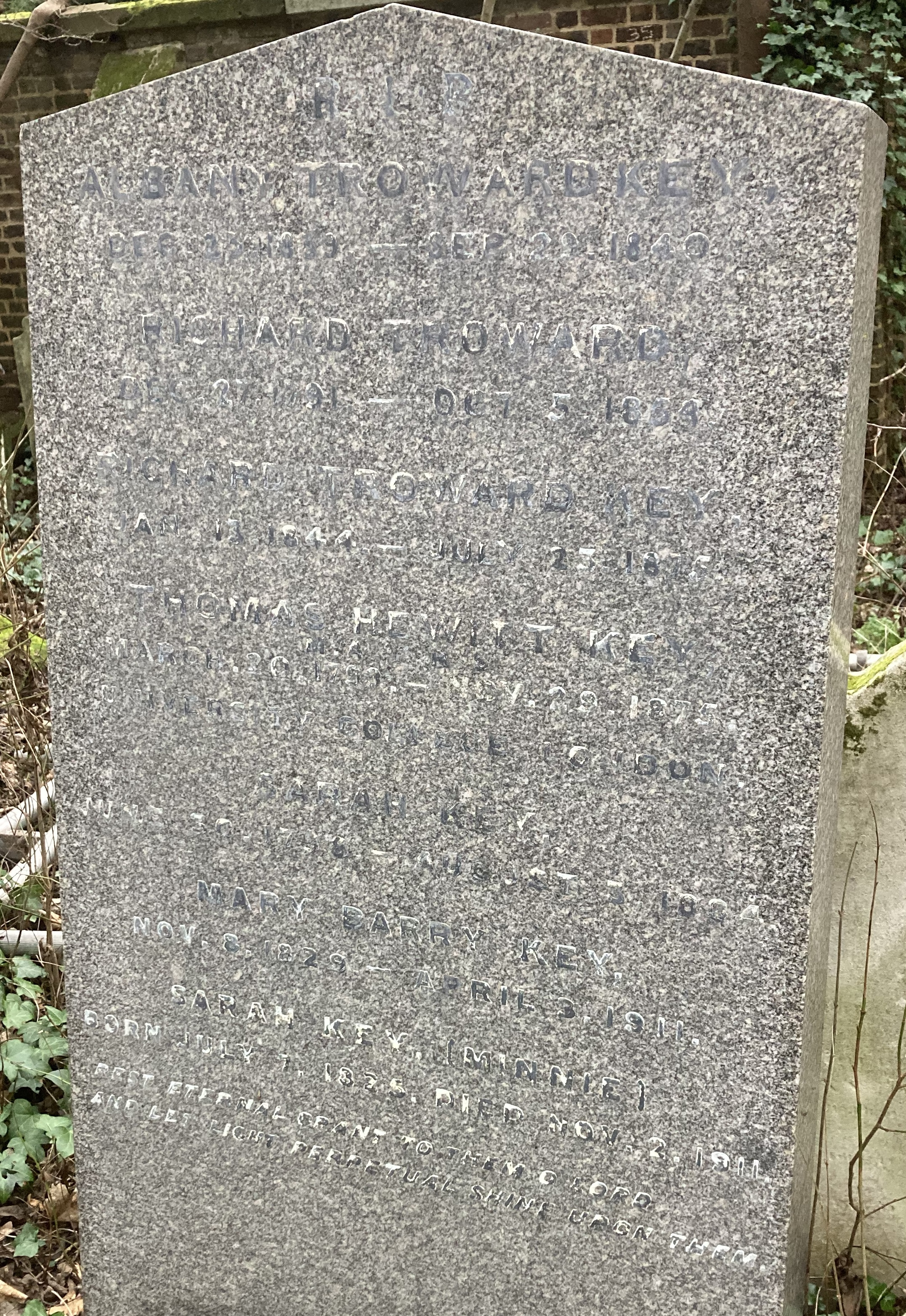
Grave of Thomas Hewitt Key in Highgate Cemetery

He was born in London and educated at St John's and Trinity Colleges, Cambridge, and graduated 19th wrangler in 1821. From 1825 to 1827 he was the founding professor of Pure mathematics in the University of Virginia; Key owned at least one slave during his time there. After his return to England was appointed in 1828 professor of Latin in the newly founded University of London.

In 1832 he became joint headmaster of the school founded in connection with that institution (the University College School); in 1842 he resigned the professorship of Latin, and took up that of comparative grammar, together with the undivided headmastership of the school. These two posts he held until his death. A few years before his death, he also took the position of secretary to the College of Preceptors in London (later known as the College of Teachers).

Key is best known for his introduction of the crude-form (the uninflected form or stem of words) system, in general use among Sanskrit grammarians, into the teaching of the classical languages. This system was embodied in his Latin Grammar (1846). In Language, its Origin and Development (1874), he upheld the onomatopoeic theory.

Key was prejudiced against the German Sanskritists, and the etymological portion of his Latin Dictionary, published in 1888, was severely criticized on this account. He was a Fellow of the Royal Society and president of the Philological Society, to the Transactions of which he contributed largely.

Key was the great-grandfather of British authors Rumer Godden and Jon Godden, and the uncle of English-Canadian priest Edmund Wood, the founder of the Church of St. John the Evangelist in Montreal, Canada's first Anglo-Catholic parish.

Key was buried on the western side of Highgate Cemetery.

== Bibliography ==
- Proceedings of the Royal Society, vol. xxiv. (1876)
- Robinson Ellis in the Academy (Dec. 4, 1875)
- J. P. Hicks, T. Hewitt Key (1893), where a full list of his works and contributions is given.
- Stray, Christopher. "Key, Thomas Hewitt". Oxford Dictionary of National Biography (online ed.). Oxford University Press. doi:10.1093/ref:odnb/15407. (Subscription, Wikipedia Library access or UK public library membership required.)
