= Epistle to the Hebrews =

Book of the New Testament

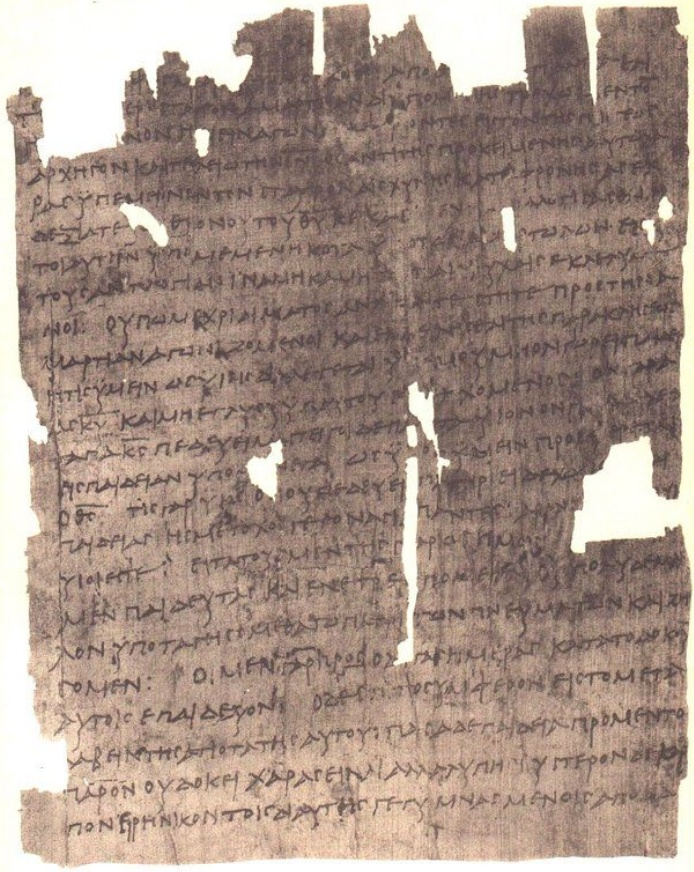
Hebrews 12:1–11 on Papyrus 13 (c. AD 300)

The Epistle to the Hebrews (Note: The book is sometimes called the Letter to the Hebrews, or simply Hebrews. It is most commonly abbreviated as "Heb.") (Koine Greek: Πρὸς Ἑβραίους, romanized: Pròs Hebraíous, lit. 'to the Hebrews'), often referred to as Hebrews, is one of the books of the New Testament.

The text does not mention the name of its author, but was traditionally attributed to Paul the Apostle; most of the Ancient Greek manuscripts, the Old Syriac Peshitta and some of the Old Latin manuscripts place the epistle to the Hebrews among Paul's letters. However, doubt on Pauline authorship in the Roman Church is reported by Eusebius. Modern biblical scholarship considers its authorship unknown, with Pauline authorship mostly rejected. A minority views Hebrews as written in deliberate imitation of the style of Paul, with some contending that it was authored by Apollos or Priscilla and Aquila.

Scholars of Greek consider its writing to be more polished and eloquent than any other book of the New Testament, and "the very carefully composed and studied Greek of Hebrews is not Paul's spontaneous, volatile contextual Greek." It has been described as an intricate New Testament book. Some scholars believe it was written for Jewish Christians who lived in Jerusalem. Its essential purpose was to exhort Christians to persevere in the face of persecution. At this time, certain believers were considering turning back to Judaism and to the Jewish system of law to escape being persecuted for believing Jesus to be the Messiah. The theme of the epistle is the teaching of the person of Jesus Christ and his role as mediator between God and humanity.

According to traditional scholarship, the author of the Epistle to the Hebrews, following in the footsteps of Paul, argued that Jewish Law had played a legitimate role in the past but was superseded by a New Covenant for the Gentiles (cf. Romans 7:1–6; Galatians 3:23–25; Hebrews 8, 10). However, a growing number of scholars note that the terms Gentile, Christian and Christianity are not present in the text and posit that Hebrews was written for a Jewish audience, and is best seen as a debate between Jewish followers of Jesus and proto-rabbinical Judaism. In tone, and detail, Hebrews goes beyond Paul and attempts a more complex, nuanced, and openly adversarial definition of the relationship. The epistle opens with an exaltation of Jesus as "the radiance of God's glory, the express image of his being, and upholding all things by his powerful word" (Hebrews 1:1–3). The epistle presents Jesus with the titles "pioneer" or "forerunner", "Son" and "Son of God", "priest" and "high priest". The epistle casts Jesus as both exalted Son and High Priest, a unique dual Christology.

== Composition ==
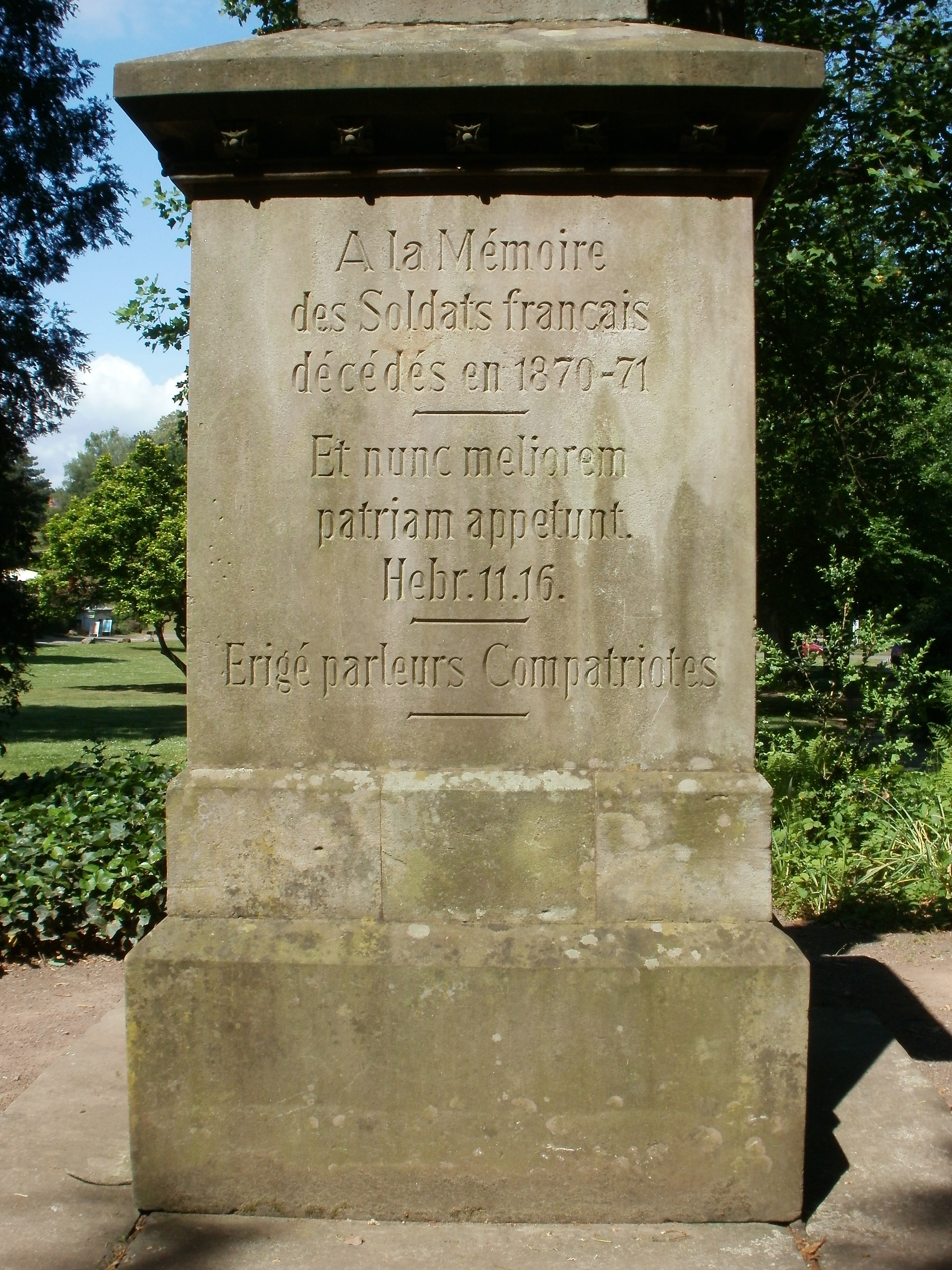
Memorial to French soldiers of the Franco-Prussian War: it quotes Heb 11:16, "they desire a better country."

Hebrews uses Old Testament quotations interpreted in light of first-century rabbinical Judaism. New Testament and Second Temple Judaism scholar Eric Mason argues that the conceptual background of the priestly Christology of the Epistle to the Hebrews closely parallels presentations of the messianic priest and Melchizedek in the Qumran scrolls. In both Hebrews and Qumran, a priestly figure is discussed in the context of a Davidic figure; in both cases a divine decree appoints the priests to their eschatological duty; both priestly figures offer an eschatological sacrifice of atonement. Although the author of Hebrews was not directly influenced by Qumran's "Messiah of Aaron", these and other conceptions did provide "a precedent... to conceive Jesus similarly as a priest making atonement and eternal intercession in the heavenly sanctuary".

=== Authorship ===
By the end of the first century there was no consensus on the author's identity. Over the ensuing centuries, scholars have suggested Clement of Rome, Barnabas, Paul the Apostle, Luke the Evangelist, Silas, Apollos, and Priscilla and Aquila as possible authors.

In the 3rd century, Origen wrote of the letter:

In the epistle entitled To The Hebrews the diction does not exhibit the characteristic roughness of speech or phraseology admitted by the Apostle [Paul] himself, the construction of the sentences is closer to the Greek usage, as anyone capable of recognising differences of style would agree. On the other hand the matter of the epistle is wonderful, and quite equal to the Apostle's acknowledged writings: the truth of this would be admitted by anyone who has read the Apostle carefully... If I were asked my personal opinion, I would say that the matter is the Apostle's but the phraseology and construction are those of someone who remembered the Apostle's teaching and wrote his own interpretation of what his master had said. So if any church regards this epistle as Paul's, it should be commended for so doing, for the primitive Church had every justification for handing it down as his. Who wrote the epistle is known to God alone: the accounts that have reached us suggest that it was either Clement, who became Bishop of Rome, or Luke, who wrote the gospel and the Acts.

— Origen, quoted in Eusebius, The History of the Church

Matthew J. Thomas argues that Origen was not denying Paul's authorship of Hebrews in that quote, but that he was only meaning that Paul would have employed an amanuensis to compose the letter. He points out that in other writings and quotations of Hebrews, Origen describes Paul as the author of the letter.

In the 4th century, Jerome and Augustine of Hippo supported Paul's authorship: the Church largely agreed to include Hebrews as the fourteenth letter of Paul, and affirmed this authorship until the Reformation. Scholars argued that in the 13th chapter of Hebrews, Timothy is referred to as a companion. Timothy was Paul's missionary companion in the same way Jesus sent disciples out in pairs. The writer also states that he wrote the letter from "Italy", which also at the time fits Paul. The difference in style is explained as simply an adjustment to a distinct audience, to the Jewish Christians who were being persecuted and pressured to go back to traditional Judaism.

Many scholars now believe that the author was one of Paul's pupils or associates, citing stylistic differences between Hebrews and the other Pauline epistles. Recent scholarship has favored the idea that the author was probably a leader of a predominantly Jewish congregation to whom they were writing.

Because of its anonymity, it had some trouble being accepted as part of the Christian canon, being classed with the Antilegomena. Eventually it was accepted as Scripture because of its sound theology, eloquent presentation, and other intrinsic factors. In antiquity, certain circles began to ascribe it to Paul in an attempt to provide the anonymous work with an explicit apostolic pedigree.

The original King James Version of the Bible titled the work "The Epistle of Paul the Apostle to the Hebrews". However, the KJV's attribution to Paul was only a guess, and is currently disputed by recent research. Its vastly different style, different theological focus, different spiritual experience and different Greek vocabulary are all believed to make Paul's authorship of Hebrews increasingly indefensible. At present, modern scholarship does not ascribe Hebrews to Paul.

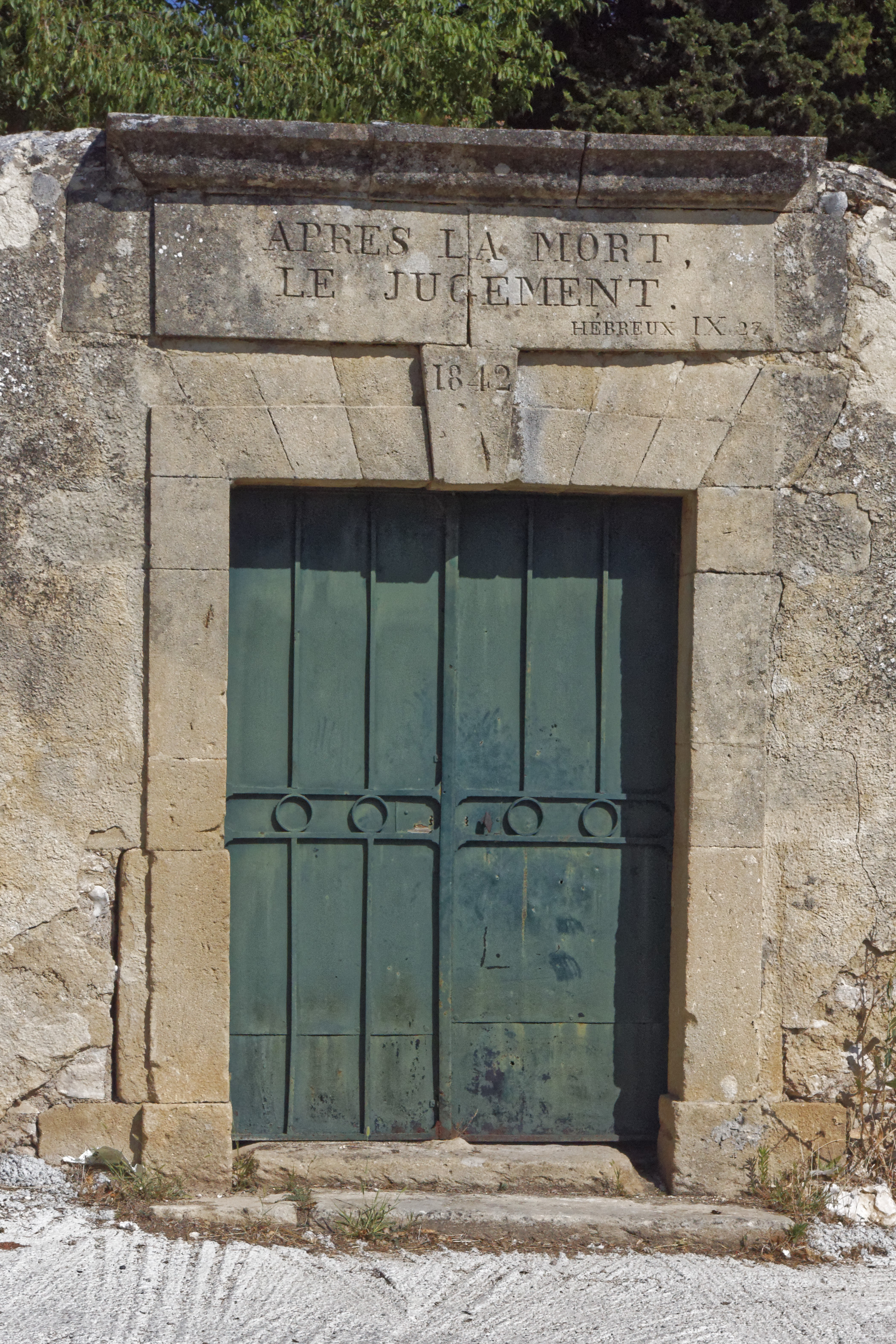
Inscription at Salinelles cemetery, Hebrews 9:27; "After death, judgment."

A.J. Gordon ascribes the authorship of Hebrews to Priscilla, writing that "It is evident that the Holy Spirit made this woman Priscilla a teacher of teachers". Later proposed by Adolf von Harnack in 1900, Harnack's reasoning won the support of prominent Bible scholars of the early-20th century. Harnack believes the letter was written in Rome – not to the Church, but to the inner circle. In setting forth his evidence for Priscillan authorship, he finds it amazing that the name of the author was blotted out by the earliest tradition. Citing Hebrews 13, he says it was written by a person of "high standing and apostolic teacher of equal rank with Timothy". If Luke, Clement, Barnabas, or Apollos had written it, Harnack believes their names would not have been obliterated.

Donald Guthrie's commentary The Letter to the Hebrews (1983) mentions Priscilla by name as a suggested author.

Believing the author to have been Priscilla, Ruth Hoppin posits that the name was omitted either to suppress its female authorship, or to protect the letter itself from suppression.

Also convinced that Priscilla was the author of Hebrews, Gilbert Bilezikian, professor of biblical studies at Wheaton College, remarks on "the conspiracy of anonymity in the ancient church," and reasons: "The lack of any firm data concerning the identity of the author in the extant writings of the church suggests a deliberate blackout more than a case of collective loss of memory."

=== Date ===
The use of tabernacle terminology in Hebrews has been used to date the epistle before the destruction of the temple, the idea being that knowing about the destruction of both Jerusalem and the temple would have influenced the development of the author's overall argument. Therefore, the most probable date for its composition is the second half of the year 63 or the beginning of 64, according to the Catholic Encyclopedia.

The text itself, for example, makes a contrast between the resurrected Christ "in heaven" "who serves in the sanctuary, the true tabernacle set up by the Lord" and the version on earth, where "there being the priests who are offering according to the law, the gifts, who unto an example and shadow do serve of the heavenly things" (Hebrews 8:4–5 YLT)

Despite this, some scholars, such as Harold Attridge and Ellen Aitken, hold to a later date of composition, between 70 and 100 AD.

== Audience ==
German scholar Adolf Jülicher rejected the traditional view that the epistle was directed to a Hebrew congregation in Israel, concluding instead that the "only supposition that is really encouraged by the Epistle itself... is that Hebrews was addressed to the place where it first made its appearance, i.e. to Rome."

Scholars have suggested that Hebrews is part of an internal New Testament debate between the extreme Judaizers (who argued that non-Jews must convert to Judaism before they can receive the Holy Spirit of Jesus' New Covenant) versus the extreme antinomians (who argued that Jews must reject God's commandments and that Jewish law was no longer in effect). James and Paul represent the moderates of each faction, respectively, and Peter may have served as moderator.

It sets before the Jew the claims of Christianity – to bring the Jew to the full realization of the relation of Judaism to Christianity, to make clear that Christ has fulfilled those temporary and provisional institutions, and has thus abolished them. This view is commonly referred to as supersessionism. According to the theology of supersessionism, the church replaces Israel, and thus the church takes the place of Israel as the people of God. The dominant interpretation in modern Hebrews scholarship has been that the epistle contains an implicit supersessionist claim (that the Levitical sacrifices and the Levitical priests have been replaced/superseded by Christ's sacrifice). Per Bibliowicz, Hebrews scholars may be divided into those that are supportive-sympathetic to the epistle's theological message, those that are critical of the epistle's supersessionary message, and those attempting a middle ground.

Due to the importance of Hebrews for the formation of future Christian attitudes toward Jews and Judaism, a distinction must be made between the author's intent and the way in which the text was interpreted by future generations. The impact of the deployment and implementation of supersession theology is difficult to convey and grasp. The implementation of this theological claim eventually led to the negation and disenfranchisement of Jewish followers of Jesus, and later, of all non-Christian Jews.

== Purpose for writing ==
Those to whom Hebrews is written seem to have begun to doubt whether Jesus could really be the Messiah for whom they were waiting. The Book of Hebrews argues that the Hebrew Scriptures foretold that the Messiah would be a priest (although of a different sort than the traditional Levitical priests) and Jesus came to fulfill this role, as a sacrificial offering to God, to atone for sins. His role of a king is yet to come, and so those who follow him should be patient and not be surprised that they suffer for now.

Some scholars today believe the document was written to prevent apostasy. Some have interpreted apostasy to mean a number of different things, such as a group of Christians in one sect leaving for another more conservative sect, one of which the author disapproves. Some have seen apostasy as a move from the Christian assembly to pagan ritual. In light of a possibly Jewish-Christian audience, the apostasy in this sense may be in regard to Jewish Christians leaving the Christian assembly to return to the Jewish synagogue. The focus on "purifying" the "conscience/consciousness" (9:9; 9:14; 10:2; 10:22) has also been viewed as key for the writing of Hebrews. The author writes, "Let us hold fast to our confession". The epistle has been viewed as a long, rhetorical argument for having confidence in the new way to God revealed in Jesus Christ.

The book could be argued to affirm special creation. It says that God by his Son, Jesus Christ, made the worlds. "God [...] hath in these last days spoken unto us by his Son [...] by whom also he made the worlds". The epistle also emphasizes the importance of faith. "Through faith we understand that the worlds were framed by the word of God, so that things which are seen were not made of things which do appear".

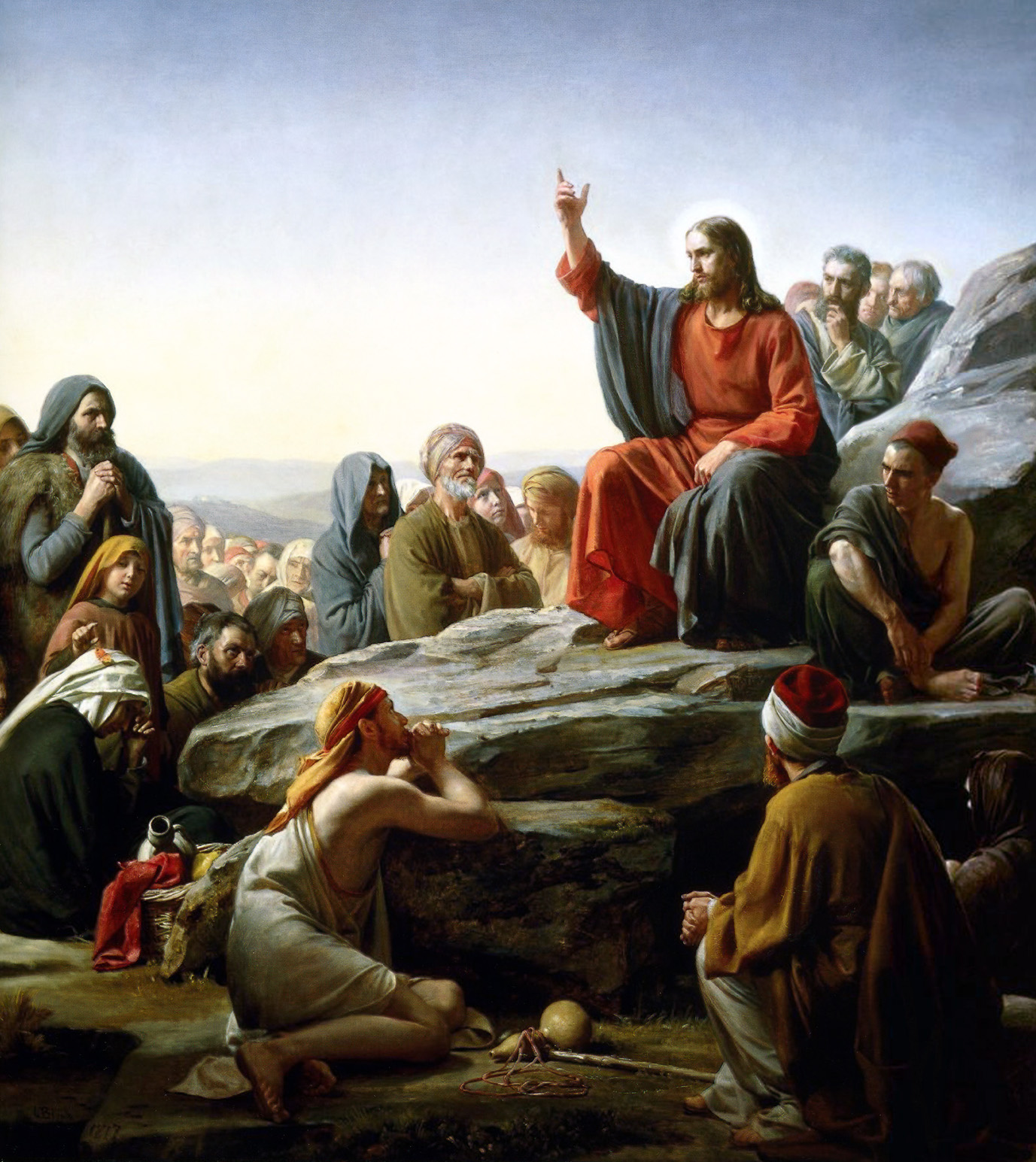
Christians believe that Jesus is the mediator of the New Covenant. His famous sermon from a hill representing Mount Zion is considered by many Christian scholars to be the antitype of the proclamation of the Old Covenant by Moses from Mount Sinai.

...the Epistle opens with the solemn announcement of the superiority of the New Testament Revelation by the Son over Old Testament Revelation by the prophets. It then proves and explains from the Scriptures the superiority of this New Covenant over the Old by the comparison of the Son with the angels as mediators of the Old Covenant, with Moses and Joshua as the founders of the Old Covenant, and finally, by opposing the high-priesthood of Christ after the order of Melchisedech to the Levitical priesthood after the order of Aaron.

— Leopold Fonck, The Catholic Encyclopedia, 1910

== Style ==
Hebrews is a very consciously "literary" document. The purity of its Greek was noted by Clement of Alexandria, according to Eusebius, and Eusebius also quoted Origen of Alexandria as assuming Paul used a scribe, arguing that every competent judge must recognize a great difference between the style of this epistle and those of Paul.

The letter consists of two strands: an expositional or doctrinal strand, and a hortatory or strongly urging (Note: Also translated "exhorting") strand which punctuates the exposition parenthetically at key points as warnings to the readers.

Hebrews does not fit the form of a traditional Hellenistic epistle, lacking a proper prescript. Modern scholars generally believe this book was originally a sermon or homily, although possibly modified after it was delivered to include the travel plans, greetings and closing.

Hebrews contains many references to the Old Testament – specifically to the Septuagint text.

== Christology ==
The Epistle to the Hebrews is notable for the manner in which it expresses the divine nature of Christ. A.C. Purdy said in The Interpreter's Bible:

We may sum up our author's Christology negatively by saying that he has nothing to do with the older Hebrew messianic hopes of a coming Son of David, who would be a divinely empowered human leader to bring in the kingdom of God on earth; and that while he still employs the figure of a militant, apocalyptic king [...] who will come again [...], this is not of the essence of his thought about Christ.
Positively, our author presents Christ as divine in nature, and solves any possible objection to a divine being who participates in human experience, especially in the experience of death, by the priestly analogy. He seems quite unconscious of the logical difficulties of his position proceeding from the assumption that Christ is both divine and human, at least human in experience although hardly in nature.

Mikeal Parsons has commented "If the humanity of Jesus is an important theme for Hebrews, how much more is Jesus' deity." According to Parsons, the theme of exaltation is asserted in various ways, such as the assertion of Jesus' superiority to the angels and Moses. The first chapter of Hebrews and the name "Son" itself indicate superiority to the angels. Hebrews 3:1–6 and its larger context (3:1–4:16), as well as the verse Nu. 12:7, indicate that Jesus is also superior to Moses, who is a servant. 11:26 also shows that Moses was one of many witnesses who looked up to Jesus.

== See also ==
- Textual variants in the New Testament § Epistle to the Hebrews

== Notes ==
Epistle to the Hebrews Epistle
Preceded by Pauline Epistle to Philemon	New Testament; Books of the Bible	Succeeded by General Epistle of James
