= Gordon Scurfield =

English biologist and author

Gordon Scurfield (9 June 1924 – 24 September 1996) was an English biologist and author, active in Australia, with expertise in botany and ecology. He engaged in a variety of projects in several divisions of CSIRO, and published over 50 papers in journals serving fields as diverse as chemistry, haematology and mineralogy.

== Biography ==
Scurfield was born in Houghton-le-Spring, city of Sunderland, County Durham, England, the youngest child of Thomas William Scurfield and Mary Ann Scurfield (née Wardle). Educated at Houghton Grammar School in Houghton-le-Spring, Scurfield studied Science at the University of Sheffield, where he took his Doctorate of Philosophy with a thesis on the ash woods of Monk's Dale, Derbyshire.

Scurfield came to Australia in 1956, to a post in the CSIRO Division of Forest Products. Based initially in Canberra, he moved to Melbourne in the 1960s, where he bought a 30-acre (120,000 m^{2}) block at Wonga Park. There his family of three daughters (Jill Rosemary Scurfield, Lorna Maryanne Scurfield and Philippa Mary Joy Rowlands nee. Scurfield) grew up, sharing his interest in land use and conservation. His career as a biologist, with expertise in botany and ecology, saw him engaged in a variety of projects in several divisions of CSIRO, and publishing papers in journals serving fields as diverse as chemistry, haematology and mineralogy. His first marriage to Irene Elizabeth Scurfield nee Medley ended in divorce in 1976.

His lifelong interest in maps found expression in private research into the historical geography of northern England. Using written documentary records, he reconstructed maps of the landscape of the seventeenth century, portraying his results in topographic maps that were reminiscent of the early Ordnance Survey sheets. This led him to the Map Room in the State Library of Victoria, which has an outstanding collection of Ordnance Survey maps. The map librarian who helped him was Judith Wells, whom he married in 1982, and who introduced him to the Australian Map Circle.

After he took early retirement in 1985, Gordon switched his interest to the historical geography of Victoria, and collaborated with Judith in a number of publications. Together they wrote introductions to A Chapter on Port Phillip, by Robert Hoddle, published by Garravembi Press in 1991, and Plan of the Township of Hamilton Situate on the Grange Burn, published by Bellcourt in 1995. For the Institution of Surveyors of Australia, they wrote The Hoddle years: surveying in Victoria, 1836-1853, published in 1995.

Gordon Scurfield died in Melbourne on 24 September 1996. Even though he continued to write until a few weeks before his death, Gordon left several projects unfinished.

== Publications ==
- Scurfield, G. and Scurfield, J.M. 1995, The Hoddle Years: Surveying in Victoria, 1836–1853, Institute of Surveyors Australia, Canberra, 144 pp. Call Number: 526.909945 SCU, ISBN 0-9599803-2-6

== Published research papers ==
Gordon Scurfield published over 50 research papers. Below is an incomplete list of his published papers:

- Scurfield, G., 1967. The ultrastructure of reaction wood differentiation. Holzforschung 21, 6-13.
- Scurfield, G., 1967. Histochemistry of reaction wood differentiation in Pinus radiata D. Don. Aust. J. Bot. 15, 377-92.
- Scurfield, G., and Silva S.R., 1969. The structure of reaction wood as indicated by scanning electron microscopy. Aust. J. Bot. 17, 391-402.
- Scurfield, G., Silva, S.R., and Wold, M.B., 1972. Failure of wood under load applied parallel to grain: a study using scanning electron microscopy. Micron 3, 160-84.
- Scurfield, G., Mitchell, A.J., and Silva, S.R., 1973. Crystals in woody stems. J. Linn. Soc. London Bot. 66, 277-89.
- Scurfield, G., Anderson, C.A. and Segnit, E.R., 1974a. Silica in woody stems. Aust. J. Bot., 22: 211-229.
- Scurfield, G. Segnit, E.R. and Anderson, C.A., 1974b. Silicifcation of wood. Proc. SEM Conf. IIT Res. Inst., Proc. Workshop on Scanning Electron Microscopy and the Plant Sciences, Chicago, Ill., 1974, pp. 389–396.
- Scurfield, G., 1979. Wood petrification: an aspect of biomineralogy. Aust. J. Bot., 27: 377-390.
- Scurfield, G. and Segnit, E. R., 1984, Petrification of wood by silica minerals. Sedimentary Geology. vol. 39, no. 1, pp. 149–167.
