= Railway Wood =

Railway Wood may refer to:

- Railway Wood (County Durham), a woodland in County Durham, England
- Railway Wood (Ypres), a woodland near Ypres, Belgium
  - RE Grave, Railway Wood, a war cemetery and memorial near Ypres, Belgium
