= William Wright (physician) =

William Wright (July 2, 1827 – 1908) was a Canadian physician, academic and Anglican curate. He is considered to be Canada's first black medical doctor.

== Early life ==
Wright was born in Quebec City on July 2, 1827, to William Wright, a clerk born in Nova Scotia and British-born Mary Blake. He was the grandson of Joseph Wright who served in the Black drummers of the 29th (Worcestershire) Regiment of Foot.

== Medical and academic career ==
On May 2, 1843, Wright began to study medicine with an apprenticeship under Dr. James Crawford. He graduated on May 5, 1848, at the age of 20.

In 1850, Wright began to teach anatomy and later pharmacology at the McGill University Faculty of Medicine, which he would do for 33 years. Wright served as a surgeon and obstetrician, and later served as the chair of the department of pharmacology. In 1882, Wright's students complained he was not keeping up to date on the latest advances in medicine and threatened boycotted his classes, resulting in him being forced resign from the school in 1883. While there is no specific evidence that his forced departure was related to his race, it followed the pattern of similar events that resulted in the departures of African American faculty and academic staff in the United States in the aftermath of the American Civil War.

== Religious life ==
In 1864, Wright was ordained as a deacon by Right Reverend Francis Fulford, Anglican Bishop of Montreal. He became the first curate of St. James the Apostle Anglican Church in Montreal. On May 28, 1871, Bishop Ashton Oxenden ordained Wright as a priest at St. Stephen's Anglican Church in Lachine and served for one year as rector. From 1875 to 1908 he served as an honorary assistant at the Church of St. John the Evangelist in Montreal. Following his death, a stained glass window at St. John the Evangelist was dedicated in his honour by fellow physician and William Osler and the rector, Reverend Edmund Wood.

== Personal life ==
Wright married Margaret Mason Harbeson of Quebec in Sillery, Quebec on September 3, 1864. They had two sons, both of whom also became Anglican clergy.
