= Railway Wood (County Durham) =

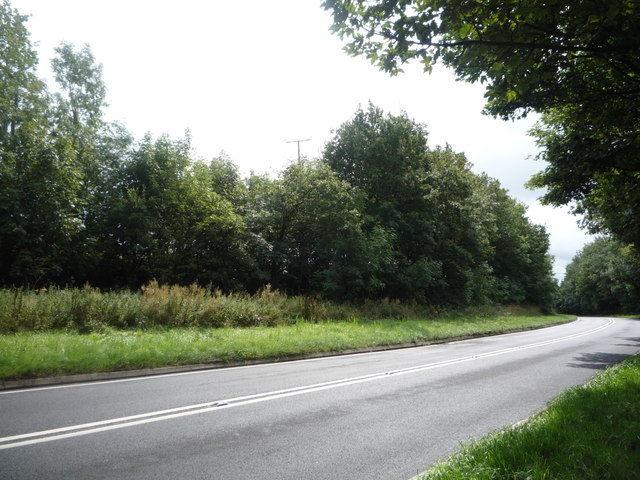

- Location within County Durham
- Interactive map of Railway Wood

Geography
- Location: County Durham, England
- OS grid: NZ316498
- Coordinates: 54.842°N 1.508°W
- Area: 4.83 hectares (11.94 acres)

Administration
- Authority: Woodland Trust

Railway Wood is a woodland in County Durham, England, near the village of Fence Houses. It covers a total area of 4.83 hectares (11.94 acres). It is owned and managed by the Woodland Trust.
