= Edmund Wood (priest) =

Canadian Anglican priest (1830–1909)

Edmund Wood (27 February 1830 – 27 September 1909) was an English-Canadian Anglican priest, best known as the founder of the Church of St. John the Evangelist in Montreal, Quebec, the first Anglo-Catholic parish in Canada.

== Early life and education ==
Wood was born on February 27, 1930, on Lombard Street in the City of London near St Mary-le-Bow, the third son of William Wood and Anne Aston Key. His family were mainly educators, but also included several clergy, one of whom was Bransby Lewis Key who would become the second Bishop of St. John's in South Africa.

Wood was baptized at the Church of St Edmund, King and Martyr and was educated at Turrell's School in Brighton and at University College School on Gowers Street in London, where his uncle, Thomas Hewitt Key was headmaster.

Wood spent one term at St John's College, Oxford, but due to his family's financial situation, ended up transferring to the less expensive University College, Durham in 1849, where he later obtained a BA in 1854 and a MA in 1857. While there, he was involved with the Durham Cathedral choir.

== Career ==
=== Deacon ===
Wood was ordained a Deacon in 1855 by the Bishop of Manchester James Prince Lee who was acting on behalf of the Bishop of Durham Edward Maltby. While in Durham, he became closely associated with Rev. John Gray, who was active in the High church party in the Diocese of Durham. Rev. Gray would nominate Rev. Wood to his first curacy was to his parish St Michael and All Angels' Church in Houghton-le-Spring.

Wood's parents, one brother and two sisters emigrated to British North America in 1849, originally settling in Grand Falls, New Brunswick, then on to Lake Témiscouata in the Province of Canada and finally to Montreal. Following William Wood's passing in 1857, William Bennett Bond, the rector of St. George's Church, suggested that Edmund Wood seek a posting in the Anglican Diocese of Montreal. In November 1858, Rev. Wood resigned his position in Houghton-le-Spring and emigrated to Montreal. His mother would reside with him until her death in 1884.
