= Chris Penman =

English footballer (born 1945)

Personal information
- Full name: Christopher Penman
- Date of birth: 12 September 1945 (age 81)
- Place of birth: Houghton-le-Spring, England
- Position: Goalkeeper

Senior career*
| Years | Team | Apps | (Gls) |
| | Preston North End | 0 | (0) |
| 1962–1964 | Darlington | 30 | (0) |
- South Shields
- * Club domestic league appearances and goals

Christopher Penman (born 12 September 1945) is an English former footballer who made 30 appearances in the Football League playing as a goalkeeper for Darlington in the 1960s. He was on the books of Preston North End, but never represented them in the League, and went on to play non-league football for South Shields. When he was only 18 years old, he was in goal as Darlington suffered what remained their record Football League defeat, 10–0 at Doncaster Rovers in the Fourth Division.
