= Thomas Miles Richardson =

English painter

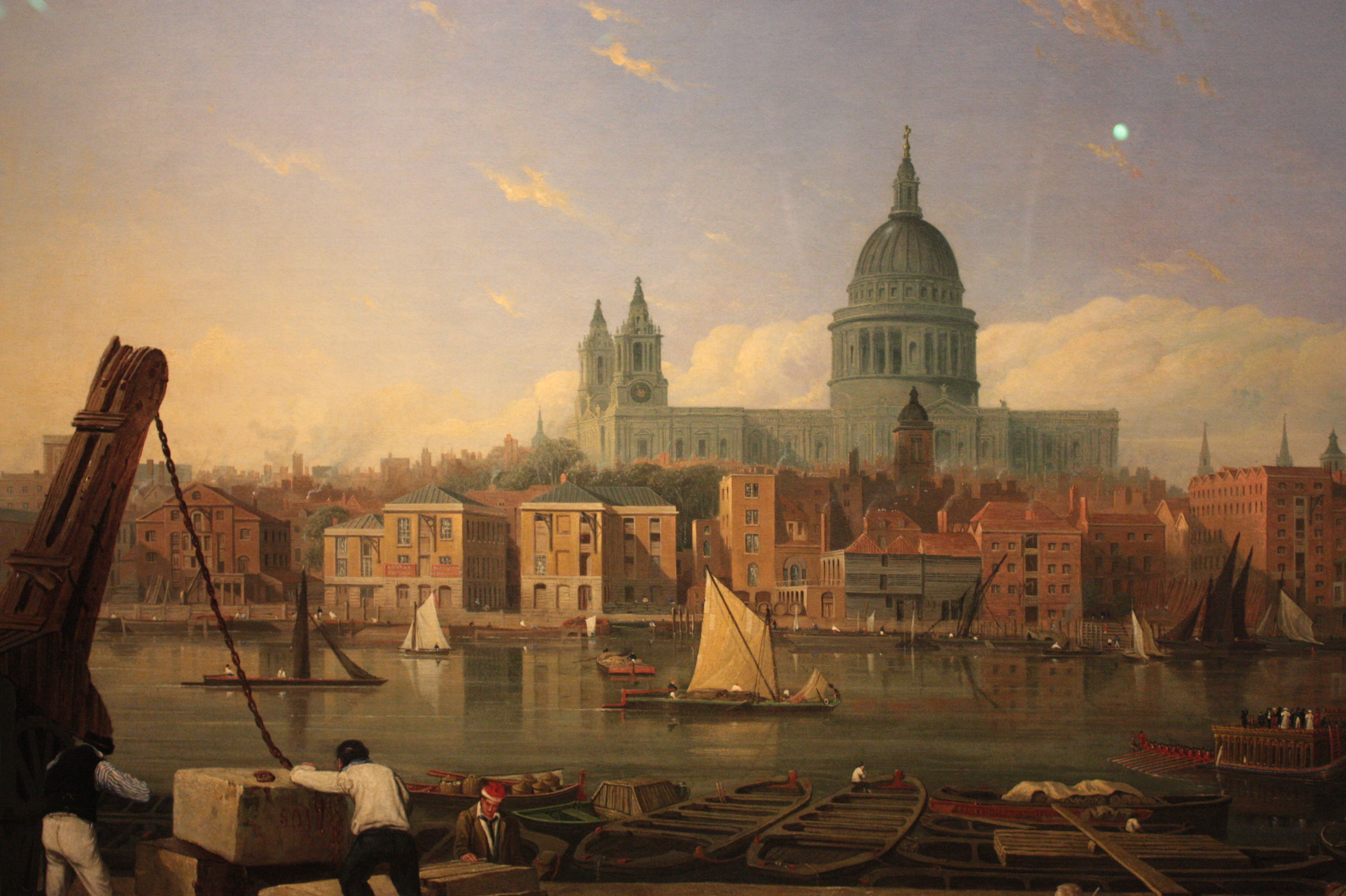
The City from Bankside by Thomas Miles Richardson, c.1820

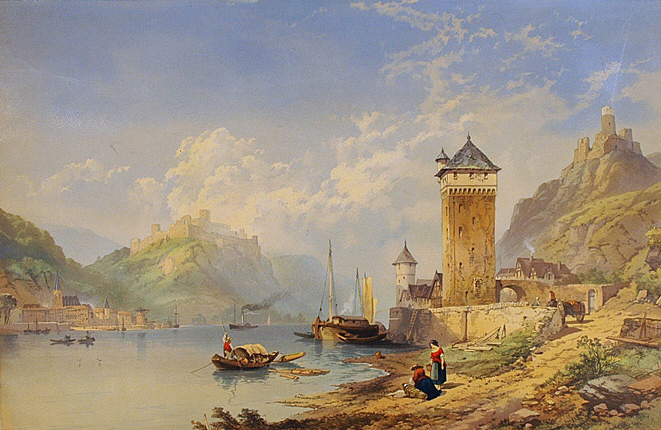
Chromolithograph c.1865 of St. Goarshausen.

Thomas Miles Richardson (1784–1848) was an English landscape-painter.

== Life ==
He was born at Newcastle on 15 May 1784. His father, George Richardson (died 1806) was the master of St. Andrew's grammar school, Newcastle; Moses Aaron Richardson was a younger brother.

Richardson was at first apprenticed to an engraver and afterwards to a cabinet-maker, whom he left to set up in business for himself. After five years of cabinet-making, he became a teacher, and from 1806 to 1813 filled the post which his father had held at the grammar school. Then he decided to adopt an artistic career, and soon acquired a reputation as a painter of landscape. He worked chiefly in watercolour, and found most of his subjects in the scenery of the Borders and the Scottish Highlands, though in later life he went as far afield as Italy and Switzerland.

He died at Newcastle on 7 March 1848, leaving a widow and a large family, six of whom (George Richardson, Edward Richardson 1810-1874, Thomas Miles Richardson Jr.1813-1890, Henry Burdon Richardson, Charles Richardson and John Isaac Richardson) followed the father's profession.

== Works ==
His first notable picture was a ‘View of Newcastle from Gateshead Fell,’ which was purchased by the Newcastle corporation. In 1816 he began to illustrate with aquatints his brother's ‘Collection of Armorial Bearings … in the Chapel of St. Andrew, Newcastle-upon-Tyne,’ which was published in 1818, and followed in 1820 by a larger work dealing with the church of St. Nicholas, and also illustrated by Richardson. In 1833 and 1834 he was engaged on a work on the ‘Castles of the English and Scottish Borders,’ which he illustrated with mezzotints. These publications remained unfinished.

Richardson became well known as a contributor to London exhibitions from 1818, when he sent his first picture to the Royal Academy, and was elected a member of the New Watercolour Society. His work was represented in public galleries at South Kensington, at Dublin, and at Liverpool.
