= Flora Madeline Shaw =

Canadian nursing teacher (1864–1927)

- Born: January 15, 1864; Perth, Canada West
- Died: August 27, 1927 (aged 63); Liverpool, England
- Education: Montreal General Hospital Training School; Teachers College, Columbia University
- Occupation(s): Nurse and nursing teacher

Flora Madeline Shaw (January 15, 1864 – August 27, 1927) was a Canadian nurse and nursing teacher. She began her career as second and later first assistant to the Montreal General Hospital Training School for Nurses's superintendent before becoming matron of the Presbyterian Hospital in New York City. Shaw was the first Director of the McGill School for Graduate Nurses in Montreal; she was president of each of the Canadian Association of Nursing Education, the Association of Registered Nurses of the Province of Quebec and the Canadian Nurses Association. A memorial fund scholarship, a memorial tablet and the Chair of Nursing at McGill University were all dedicated to her.

== Biography ==
On January 15, 1864, Shaw was born in Perth, Canada West. She was the daughter of the merchant businessperson Henry Dowsley Shaw and his wife Flora Madeline Shaw, née Matheson; both of her parents were from Scotland and her two grandfathers, James Shaw and Roderick Matheson, were businessmen and members of Upper Canada's Legislative Council. Shaw had two sisters and a brother. She got her first education at a private school in Perth and then attended the middle-class school Mrs. Mercer's Academy in Montreal. At the age of 30, in 1894, Shaw enrolled at Montreal General Hospital Training School for Nurses. She graduated from it in 1896. She was appointed second assistant to the school's superintendent, Gertrude Livingstone, in 1896 and remained in the post for three years. Shaw did not hold the post for the 1899–1900 school year when she was made superintendent of nurses at the small Women's Charity Club Hospital in Boston.

Shaw returned to Montreal in 1900 and was appointed Livingstone's first assistant, a role she held until 1903. She went on to study a diploma in Teaching in Schools of Nursing (hospital economics) at Teachers College, Columbia University in New York City between 1904 and 1906. While in New York, Shaw was matron of the nurses' home at the Presbyterian Hospital and used the experience to publish her first nursing work concerning floor plans, furnishings, and management, and also became a dietetics instructor. In 1906, she again returned to Montreal and accepted the job of leading the project of a preliminary instruction program taken by probationary nursing students at Montreal General Hospital and the Hospital for Sick Children in Toronto. Two years later, Shaw represented Montreal General's alumni association at the first meeting of the Canadian National Association of Trained Nurses (now the Canadian Nurses Association) and she was named its inaugural secretary-treasurer.

As a consequence of her contracting tuberculosis in 1909, she resigned from her post and had to stop working for some time. Shaw spent the following six-year recuperating from her illness in sanatoriums at both Saranac Lake, New York and Sainte-Agathe-des-Monts, Quebec. Following her travelling abroad, she became a volunteer social worker for the Canadian Patriotic Fund's Montreal branch when the First World War broke out in 1914. Shaw accepted an offer to become the first Director of the McGill School for Graduate Nurses in Montreal in 1920; the school gained respect with McGill University under her directorship. She spent six weeks at Columbia University reacquainting herself with teaching before becoming director. Shaw took on administrative and teaching duties at the school. From 1922 to 1924, she was president of the Canadian Association of Nursing Education.

In 1922, Shaw was made president of the Association of Registered Nurses of the Province of Quebec (ARNPQ), a position which she held until 1926. She was highly influential in the passing of amendments to ARNPQ's charter to better nursing and nursing education standards in Quebec in 1925. Shaw was asked to preside over the 1925 International Council of Nurses meeting in Helsinki, Finland. The following year, she resigned as ARNPQ president and she was elected president of the Canadian Nurses Association on August 27. Shaw helped to secure amendments in connection with the Registration Act for Nurses in Quebec. She was a member of the National Executive Committee of the Victorian Order of Crosses and partook in local and national boards of the Order. Shaw wrote for the American Journal of Nursing, Canadian Nurse and the International Council of Nurses.

== Personal life and death ==
She was active in the Church of St. John the Evangelist, Montreal. On August 27, 1927, Shaw died of a pulmonary embolism in Liverpool Royal Infirmary, Liverpool, England while she was returning from taking part in an International Council of Nurses conference in Geneva. She did not marry. A service was held for Shaw in the Lady Chapel of Liverpool Cathedral on August 28 and a second service took place at Church of St. John the Evangelist on September 12. She was buried in Perth, Ontario.

== Legacy ==
The Flora Madeline Shaw Memorial Fund Scholarship was set up in her name by the Alumnae Association of the McGill School for Graduate Nurses in 1928 and they organized and administered the first such scholarship to be awarded to a student nurse starting from 1930. A 1929 book profiling the lives of Canadian nursing pioneers was dedicated to her by the History of Nursing Society at McGill School for Graduate Nurses. In May 1934, a memorial tablet of Shaw was unveiled by the Alumnae Association of the Montreal General Hospital for Nurses. McGill University setup the Flora Madeline Shaw Chair of Nursing in Shaw's name in 1957.
