= Grace Julia Parker Drummond =

Canadian philanthropist (1860–1942)

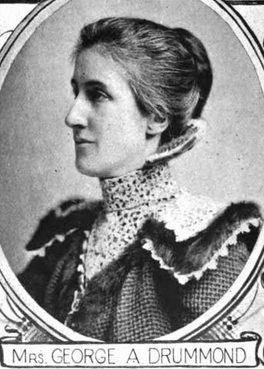
Grace Julia Parker Drummond, from a 1900 publication.

Grace Julia Parker Drummond (December 17, 1860 – June 10, 1942) was a Canadian clubwoman and philanthropist, decorated for her work during World War I.

== Early life ==
Grace Julia Parker was born in Montreal, Canada East, the daughter of Alexander Davidson Parker and Grace Gibson Parker. Both of her parents were born in Scotland. (Because she and her mother shared a first name, she was called Julia or Grace Julia.)

== Career ==
Julia Parker Drummond was the first president of Montreal's branch of the Canadian Council of Women (1893-1899), and helped to found the Montreal branch of the Victorian Order of Nurses in 1899. She was president of the city's Charity Organization Society from 1911 to 1919. She was director of the Woman's Historical Society, and she served as an advisor to the Parks and Playgrounds Association of Montreal. She "lent her aid ungrudgingly to every movement for the betterment of her sex," including women's suffrage.

During World War I, Drummond was in London as head of the Canadian Red Cross Information Bureau, providing news for families of missing and wounded soldiers, and to organize housing and other supports for Canadian men in hospital or on leave in London. She was decorated by the French government, the Serbian Red Cross, and the British Red Cross for her work. She also received an honorary degree from McGill University, in recognition of her community service in Montreal. In 1923, the Winnipeg Tribune named her one of the "12 Greatest Canadian Women" for her Red Cross work.

The Drummonds hosted many prominent visitors in their Montreal home, including opera singer Emma Albani and Lord and Lady Minto.

== Personal life ==
Julia Parker married twice, first in London to the Rev. George Hamilton in 1879; she was widowed at age 19, when Hamilton died in 1880. She married as her second husband Sir George Alexander Drummond, a Canadian senator. In addition to George Drummond's seven children from his first marriage, he and Grace had two sons together; Julian Drummond died young, and Guy Drummond died at Ypres in 1915, during World War I.

Lady Drummond was a committed Anglican, providing religious instruction to a class of girls and regularly receiving the eucharist in her parish, The Church of St. John the Evangelist, Montreal and later her sick room towards the end of her life.

Grace Julia Parker Drummond was widowed for the second time in 1910, and died on June 10, 1942, aged 82 years. Her funeral three days later was attended by large crowds of people. Lady Drummond left a substantial legacy to the Church of St. John the Evangelist following her passing. The Drummond Family Papers are archived at McCord Museum.
