= Kepier School =

Secondary school located in Houghton-le-Spring, England

Location
- Houghton-le-Spring, Tyne and Wear, DH4 5BH; England; 54.84015°N 1.47395°W

Information
- Former names: Houghton Kepier School; Houghton Kepier Sports College
- Type: Academy
- Established: 1987; 39 years ago
- Local authority: Sunderland City Council
- Department for Education URN: 137262 Tables
- Ofsted: Reports
- Principal: Colin Devlin
- Gender: Coeducational
- Age: 11 to 16
- Enrolment: 1147 As of 2025
- Capacity: 1210
- Website: www.kepier.com

Kepier School is a coeducational secondary school in Houghton-le-Spring, Sunderland, Tyne and Wear, England. As of 2025, it has 1147 pupils, and is larger than the average secondary school.

== History ==
The school was established in 1987 as a result of a merger of three local comprehensive schools: Bernard Gilpin School, Houghton School and Sancroft School. It was originally called Houghton Kepier School.

It is not connected to the nearby small fee-paying grammar school, founded in the 1570s and closed in 1922, the Royal Kepier Grammar School, but was named after it.

The school was commended by the Department for Education in 2003 for using staff who were not qualified teachers as temporary "cover supervisors" in an attempt to manage teachers' workload; the initiative was criticised by the National Union of Teachers.

The then headteacher, Sue Hyland, was the national secondary school Leadership Trust Award winner in 2002. The school had been failing when she came to it in 1999; "Results had been going down for seven years". By 2002, The Guardian described the school as "recognisably on the up", but struggling with a lack of money, particularly for staffing.

In 2001, one of the staff, Eileen Osborne, published textbooks on religion and citizenship which were used in other schools.

== Uniform controversy ==
In early September 2017, it was reported that students were forced to line up in the rain while the principal compared the students' trousers with a swatch of fabric supplied by Total Sport, to ensure the grey trousers were from this supplier. These cost £15.99, while similar products were available for £7.00 elsewhere. Students not wearing the "required" trousers were sent home.

== Inspections ==
The school has been inspected by Ofsted five times since 2012. In 2012, the inspectors deemed it "satisfactory". Both inspections in 2013 saw the school judged as "requires improvement", with the inspectors commenting that "leaders and managers do not always focus their actions where they are most needed and do not check the impact on students' achievement." In 2016, the school had improved sufficiently to be rated as "good", because of "... vastly raised teachers' expectations of how quickly pupils can make progress in all of the subjects they study."

== Notable former pupils ==
- Michael Adams, TV personality
