= Michael Adams (presenter) =

British television personality (born 1999)

- Born: 23 August 1999 (age 27); Sunderland, England
- Occupation: Media personality
- Years active: 2012–present
- Television: Show Me What You're Made Of, Blue Peter, CBBC

Michael Adams (born 23 August 1999) is a British television personality and incumbent Soaps Editor for Radio Times.

In his youth, he appeared on various programmes for CBBC, including Show Me What You're Made Of with Stacey Dooley, before joining the Metro newspaper and digital team.

== Background ==
Adams was born in Sunderland, and was raised in Houghton-le-Spring near Durham. He was educated at Houghton Kepier School in the town between 2010 and 2015, continuing studies for a further two years at the Durham Sixth Form Centre.

He later resided in Greater Manchester, where he had previously studied broadcast journalism at the University of Salford.

== Career ==
Adams first appeared on television during continuity links on CBBC with Iain Stirling in April 2012. He later went on to appear on Blue Peter with Helen Skelton and Barney Harwood during episodes broadcast in June 2012, including one on their Big Olympic Tour. The following year he appeared on continuity links for CBBC with Sam and Mark.

He was later seen on documentary series Show Me What You're Made Of with BBC Three regular Stacey Dooley in December 2013. Whilst in Brazil filming the programme, Adams worked in a bike factory, prawn farm, technology factory, baseball cap factory and a cattle farm.

In mid-2014, Adams appeared briefly in programmes for CBBC Live in Newcastle Gateshead, and worked alongside Swizzels Matlow in designing a Geordie Love Hearts sweet, which read 'Alreet Pet'.

Archival footage of Adams featured in the fifth series of Show Me What You're Made Of in 2015, and at a similar time he began contributing to media relations surrounding soap opera Coronation Street.

In August 2017 he spoke with BBC Radio 5 Live's Phil Williams about Barbara Knox's potential departure from Coronation Street. The following month he paid tribute to the late Liz Dawn in an interview with Judith Moritz for the BBC News at Six.

In January 2019, Adams confirmed on Twitter that he would appear as an uncredited bit part in the eighth series of ITV sitcom Cold Feet. Later in the year, he appeared in the revived series of Supermarket Sweep on ITV2, hosted by Rylan Clark-Neal.

Adams has worked for both of ITV's flagship soap operas, Coronation Street and Emmerdale and regularly features across broadcast media as a television critic. In February 2022, he quizzed OJ Borg as part of BBC Radio 2's Midnight Mastermind. Adams's specialist subject was the Australian soap opera Neighbours.

Between June and October 2022, he presented the weekday breakfast show on Chatterbox Radio Manchester. Following the station's closure he was then redeployed within the same production company as main co-presenter of Your Manchester, a weekly online magazine programme focusing on Greater Manchester news and events. Adams had previously served as a reporter for the show since March of the same year. He departed in the first quarter of 2024 to take up a role with Metro.

In July 2025, he appeared momentarily in an episode of Neighbours, and three months later, joined Radio Times as their first Soaps Editor.

== Filmography ==
Television
Year	Title	Notes
2012–14	CBBC Presentation	Continuity links
2012–14	Blue Peter	3 episodes
2013	Friday Download	Show Me What You're Made Of promotion
2013–15	Show Me What You're Made Of	5 episodes (2013); Archival footage (2015)
2017	BBC News at Six	Liz Dawn tribute
2019	Cold Feet	Uncredited bit part
2019	Supermarket Sweep	Contestant
2022–24	Your Manchester	Main co-presenter, former reporter
2022	This Morning	I'm a Celebrity...Get Me Out of Here! report with Georgia Toffolo
2023	Bridge of Lies	Contestant
2025	Neighbours	Uncredited bit part

Radio
Year	Title	Notes
2013	BBC Radio Newcastle	Drivetime interview
2014	BBC Radio Tees	Drivetime interview
2017–18, 2022	BBC Radio 5 Live	Soaps commentator
2020, 2022–23	BBC Radio WM	Soaps commentator
2022–	BBC Hereford and Worcester	TV critic
2022	BBC Radio 1	Newsbeat feature
2022	ABC Radio Melbourne	Interview with Sammy J
2022	ABC Radio Melbourne	Drivetime interview
2022	BBC Radio 2	Midnight Mastermind with OJ Borg
2022	Chatterbox Radio	Weekday breakfast presenter
