= Newbottle, Tyne and Wear =

Village in Tyne and Wear, England

Coordinates: 54.857571°N 1.477397°W

Newbottle
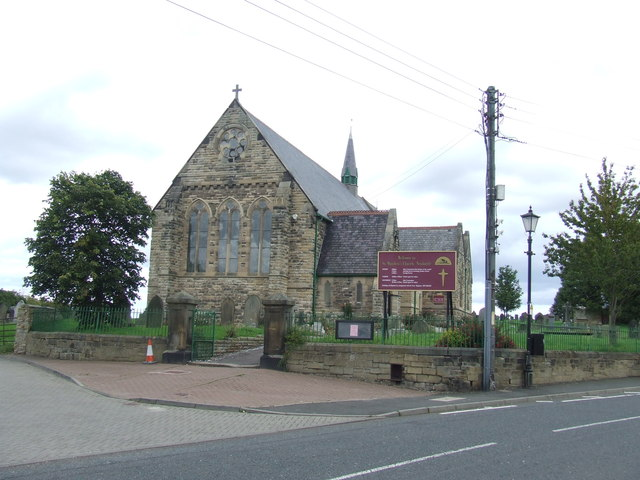
- St Matthew's Church, Newbottle

- Location within Tyne and Wear
- Metropolitan borough: Sunderland
- Metropolitan county: Tyne and Wear
- Region: North East
- Country: England
- Sovereign state: United Kingdom
- Post town: HOUGHTON LE SPRING
- Postcode district: DH4
- Police: Northumbria
- Fire: Tyne and Wear
- Ambulance: North East
- UK Parliament: Houghton and Washington East

Newbottle is a village in the Sunderland district, in Tyne and Wear, England. The village is situated between Durham 8 miles (13 km) and Sunderland is 5 miles (8.0 km). It was historically a part of County Durham.

== Location ==
Neighbouring villages and areas include Grasswell (between Newbottle and Houghton le Spring), Shiney Row (between Newbottle and Washington, Tyne and Wear), Herrington Burn (between Newbottle and Shiney Row) and Success/Philadelphia (between Newbottle and Herrington Burn).

The village is served by major road links with the A690 (to Durham/Sunderland) and A19 (to Teesside/North Tyneside) junctions one and a half miles to the east and the A1M (to Newcastle/the South) two and a half miles to the west near Chester-le-Street. Newbottle has a helicopter pad located at the bottom of Stadon Way near the entrance to Okehampton Drive.

== Etymology ==
The name Newbottle derives from the Saxon 'New Battle' meaning 'new settlement'. Newbottle village traces its roots to the year 1050, making it medieval in origin. The earliest mention of the town's name is in the Boldon Book in 1183 as 'Newbotill' and by reference to neighbouring Houghton-le-spring ('Hoctona'). An English transcription states:

"In Hoctona are thirteen cottagers, whose tenures, works and payments are like those of Newbotill; and three other half cottagers, who also work like the three half cottagers of Newbotill. Henry the greeve, holds two oxgangs of 24 acres for his service. The smith – 12 acres for his service. The carpenter holds a toft and 4 acres (16,000 m2) for his service. The punder (one who impounds straying animals) has 20 acres and the thraves of Hoctona, Wardon and Morton; he renders 60 hens and 300 eggs. The mills of Newbotill and Bidic, with half of Raynton Mill, pay XV marks. The demesne, consisting of four carucates, and the sheep pastures are in the hands of the lord."

== History ==
In the 19th century there were three potteries, one belonging to the Broderick family. A corn mill was also in the village. Another name is the Russell family, who were believed to be solicitors of Sunderland and there is still a house named Russell today. In 1691, parts of Newbottle called Hall Moor and Dubmire were divided and the tenants all claimed leasehold. There were 16 pits recorded by Lord Lumley as the "Newbottle Group" on 19 August 1762. The Collieries belonging to the Nesham family were sold to the Earl of Durham for £70,000 in 1822. The last of these ceased mining in 1956.

One of the Nesham collieries, the Success pit was the scene of a disaster on Friday 2 June 1815. The pit had reached coal at 108 fathoms (648 ft; 198 m). The explosion was obvious to the men above ground by a large column of dust rising from the pit. No flames were observed, the flame front seems to have been stopped by a large wagon blocking one of the roadways. Early reports blamed a sudden inrush of firedamp from old workings which pitmen had inadvertently broken into. Not all the men were killed by the blast. A number attempted to reach the shaft but were overcome by afterdamp, some even surviving to reach the surface before succumbing to its effects. Out of 72 men and boys underground only 15 survived; 57 were killed.

The local church, St Matthew's, dates from 1886, having replaced a previous chapel which was built in 1850. The village centre is a designated conservation area and has stone built housing. Herrington Country Park provides walking, picnics, model boating and cycling and is a mile on foot to the north of the village accessible by public footpath.

The village is situated in the Copt Hill ward on a predominantly Labour run council, however since the local elections of May 2007 the ward itself is served by an Independent councillor. Along with many other communities the local economy has changed over the past generation. The Co-operative store and Post Office have closed and the land and property developed.

Newbottle was formerly a township and chapelry in the parish of Houghton-le-Spring, in 1866 Newbottle became a separate civil parish, on 1 April 1937 the parish was abolished and merged with Houghton le Spring and East and Middle Herrington. In 1931 the parish had a population of 6811.

Newbottle has been featured in the media since 2005 North East News, BBC Look North, Durham FM, BBC Radio Newcastle, Sunderland Echo, The Journal, Evening Chronicle and The Guardian as 7,000 trees, which are part of the Great North Forest are being threatened to be chopped down to make way for 20 new football pitches, car parking and infrastructure. As a result of this threat protestors have been campaigning "Save Our Trees!". On 29 June 2006 a 'chain saw' gang acting on the instructions of developers moved into the wood and began felling trees. This action caused the local community to apply to the high court in London for an emergency injunction. Mr Justice Bennett granted the high court injunction. In 2009 the plans were allowed to go ahead and have been ongoing since January 2010, with expected completion around September. After delays, the action was started and in April 2011 a brand new Football Association sponsored and endorsed football training facility was opened. Former England player Sir Trevor Brooking and Sunderland AFC player Jordan Henderson attended the opening. The article was featured on the front page of the newspaper Sunderland Echo.

== Facilities ==
The village is served by Newbottle Workingmen's Club CIU, The Sun Inn and the Queen's Head public houses. There is also an Italian restaurant and a Chinese takeaway. There is a newsagent and a Foodstore/General dealer. Newbottle has one school, Newbottle Primary Academy which has more than 450 students from around the catchment area.

== People ==
People to have lived in the village include footballers David Meyler, Chris Turner, Thomas Sorensen and Colin Todd, and singer Bryan Ferry.
