= Chilton Moor =

Village in Tyne and Wear, England

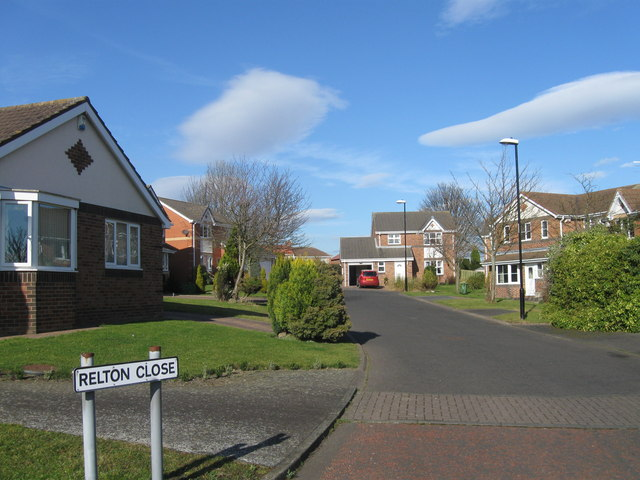
- Relton Close
- OS grid reference: NZ325500
- Metropolitan borough: City of Sunderland
- Metropolitan county: Tyne and Wear
- Region: North East
- Country: England
- Sovereign state: United Kingdom
- Post town: HOUGHTON LE SPRING
- Postcode district: DH4
- Dialling code: 0191
- Police: Northumbria
- Fire: Tyne and Wear
- Ambulance: North East
- UK Parliament: Washington East and Houghton

Chilton Moor is a village in Tyne and Wear, England. The village is located between Houghton le Spring and Fence Houses on the Tyne and Wear/County Durham county boundary.

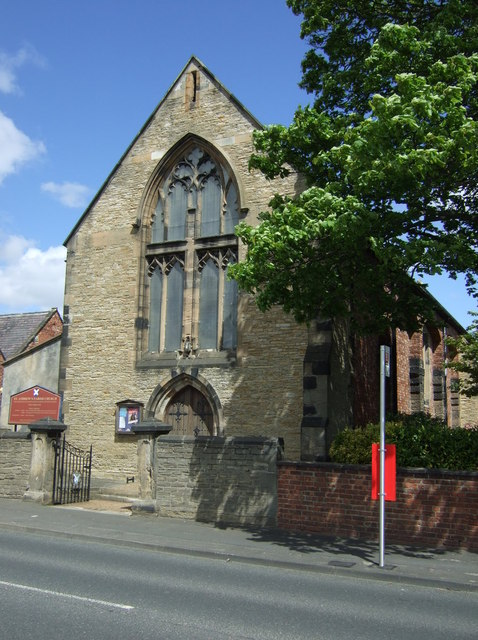
St Andrew's Church
