= Durham Sixth Form Centre =

Location
- Providence Row; The Sands; Durham, County Durham, DH1 1SG; England; 54.77988°N 1.57332°W

Information
- Former name: Durham County Girls School
- School type: Academy, sixth form college
- Established: 3 September 1913 (as Durham County Girls School)
- Local authority: Durham County Council
- Trust: Providence Learning Partnership
- Department for Education URN: 150012 Tables
- Ofsted: Reports
- Headteacher / CEO: Ellen Beveridge
- Staff: 189
- Gender: Mixed
- Age: 16 to 19
- Enrolment: 1,860 as of September 2026
- Capacity: 2000
- Website: http://www.durhamsixthformcentre.org.uk/

Durham Sixth Form Centre is a mixed sixth form college located in Durham, County Durham, England.

It is an academy administered by the Providence Learning Partnership multi-academy trust. The centre is located in Durham city centre, but enrols students from across County Durham, Sunderland and into Northumberland.

Durham Sixth Form Centre offers a range of A-levels and BTECs as programmes of study for students.

The centre is working with Durham University on Durham Mathematics School, a specialist 16–18 school for mathematics which has a provisional opening of 2028 .

== History ==
The centre opened on 3 September 1913 as Durham County Girls School, with the official opening by Hensley Henson, then Dean of Durham Cathedral and later Bishop of Durham, following on 21 January 1914. It was one of two schools (the other now being Durham Johnston Comprehensive School) established by the council from the bequest of Susan Johnston, the widow of James Finlay Weir Johnston the first reader in Chemistry at Durham University, and it had been suggested that the school should be called the Johnston School for Girls.

The girls school became mixed in 1969 and became a sixth form college in 1984. In November 2023, the sixth form centre transitioned from local authority control to be part of the Providence Learning Partnership multi-academy trust, a new trust covering both Durham Sixth Form Centre and Durham Mathematics School.

== Notable alumni ==
- Matt Baker, television presenter
- Michael Adams, television personality
- Steph Houghton, professional footballer
- Connor Lawson, star of CBBC's The Dumping Ground
