= Moses Aaron Richardson =

Moses Aaron Richardson (1793–1871) was an English publisher and antiquary.

== Life ==
He was the younger son of George Richardson (d. 1806), master of Blackett's charity school, Newcastle; his elder brother was Thomas Miles Richardson, the artist. Richardson's father came of a family of small landed proprietors in North Tyne, but had offended his parents by his marriage.

Richardson began business in a shop at 5 Blackett Street, Newcastle, as a bookseller and music and print seller. He later moved to 101 Pilgrim Street, and finally to 44 Grey Street, adding printing to his business.

In 1850, Richardson emigrated to Australia, and became a rate-collector at Prahran, a suburb of Melbourne. Here, on 2 August 1871, he died, and was buried in the St Kilda Cemetery.

== Works ==
In 1818, he published by subscription ‘A Collection of Armorial Bearings, Inscriptions, &c., in the Parochial Chapel of St. Andrew, Newcastle-upon-Tyne;’ it was illustrated with twenty-three plates of arms and a title-page, by his brother. This was followed in 1820 by a larger work, in two volumes, dealing with the church of St. Nicholas, containing fifty engravings from drawings by his brother. In 1824 Richardson, in conjunction with James Walker, brought out ‘The Armorial Bearings of the several Incorporated Companies of Newcastle-upon-Tyne, with a brief Historical Account of each Company; together with Notices of the Corpus Christi or Miracle Plays anciently performed by the Trading Societies of Newcastle-upon-Tyne.’

He published a ‘Directory of Newcastle and Gateshead’ for 1838. In the same year, when the British Association visited Newcastle, Richardson issued ‘Richardson's Descriptive Companion’ of the town and neighbourhood, with ‘An Inquiry into the Origin of the Primitive Britons.’ It was reissued in 1846. In emulation of John Sykes's Local Records, issued in 1824 and 1833, Richardson next produced ‘The Local Historian's Table Book of Remarkable Occurrences, Historical Facts, Legendary and Descriptive Ballads, &c., connected with the Counties of Newcastle-upon-Tyne, Northumberland, and Durham.’ It appeared in six volumes between 1841 and 1846, illustrated by more than eight hundred woodcuts. A financial failure, it was reissued by Henry George Bohn in 1846 under the title of ‘The Borderer's Table Book.’

Richardson issued in seven annual volumes, from 1847 onwards, ‘Reprints of Rare Tracts and Imprints of Ancient Manuscripts chiefly illustrative of the History of the Northern Counties.’ He had the assistance of Joseph Hunter and other antiquaries, and produced the volumes on fine paper, with illuminated dedications and initials.

== Family ==
He was married, and left a son, George Bourchier Richardson (d. 1877), who shared his father's tastes; he executed some of the woodcuts in the ‘Table Book’ and the ‘Reprints;’ lectured and wrote on local antiquities; and failing, after his father's emigration, to carry on his business with success, he followed him in 1854 to Australia. He acted for some time as librarian of the Melbourne Mechanics' Institute, but eventually became a journalist and editor of the ‘Wallaroo Times.’ From 1874 he taught drawing and watercolour painting at Adelaide, where he died on 28 November 1877.
