= St Michael and All Angels' Church, Houghton-le-Spring =

St Michael and All Angels' Church
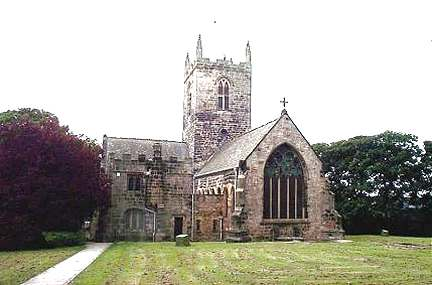

- St Michael and All Angels Church shown within Tyne and Wear
- 54.843°N 1.469°W
- OS grid reference: NZ342499
- Location: Houghton-le-Spring, Tyne and Wear
- Country: England
- Denomination: Anglican
- Website: stmichaels-hls.org.uk

History
- Status: Parish church

Architecture
- Functional status: Active
- Heritage designation: Grade I

Administration
- Diocese: Durham

St Michael and All Angels' Church is the parish church of Houghton-le-Spring, Tyne and Wear, England. The church dates from the late 12th century and contains the tomb of Bernard Gilpin. The church is a Grade I listed building.

== Notable people ==
- Edmund Wood, former deacon (1855-1858), later founded Church of St. John the Evangelist, Montreal
