= Australian and New Zealand Map Society =

- Founded: 2009
- Type: Professional organization
- Purpose: Cartography
- Region served: Australia; New Zealand
- Method: Conferences, Publications, Training
- President: Martin Woods
- Website: anzmaps.org

The Australian and New Zealand Map Society (ANZMapS), a society incorporated in Victoria, Australia, is a group of map producers, users and curators, which acts as a medium of communication for all those interested in maps. Membership of the ANZMapS is available to anyone who has an interest in maps.

The society was formed in 2009 by the merger of the Australian Map Circle (founded in 1973 as the Australian Map Curator's Circle), and the New Zealand Map Society (founded 1977).

The society holds an annual conference, publishes a peer-reviewed journal The Globe (ISSN 0311-3930), and a newsletter.

== Purpose ==
The purposes of the society are:

1. to promote public interest within Australia and New Zealand in historical and contemporary cartography and in map collections;
2. to promote the development, maintenance and preservation and effective exploitation of map collections throughout Australia and New Zealand;
3. to improve the skills and status of persons working with map collections; and
4. to promote communication between producers, users and curators of maps.

== Awards ==
Society awards:

- Dorothy Prescott Prize for the best paper presented at its annual conference.
- Patricia Alonso Memorial Prize to the student with the best third year results in the Bachelor of Applied Science (Multimedia Cartography) degree at RMIT University (until 1992 the Royal Melbourne Institute of Technology).
