= Ellen Bradshaw Aitken =

- Title: Dean of McGill University (2007–2014)

Academic background
- Education: Harvard University; University of the South; Harvard Divinity School

Academic work
- Discipline: Early New Testament Studies
- Sub-discipline: Greco-Roman hero cult and ancient Christianity

Ellen Bradshaw Aitken (1961-2014) was a Canadian New Testament scholar and the dean of Faculty of Religious Studies at McGill University (now the McGill University School of Religious Studies). She was an ordained Episcopal priest serving at the Church of St. John the Evangelist in Montreal, and was a founder of the Anglican Association of Biblical Scholars. She was “an expert in early Christian Studies, with emphasis on Hellenistic and Roman contexts…”
