= Church of St. John the Evangelist (Montreal) =

Coordinates: 45°30′35″N 73°34′05″W

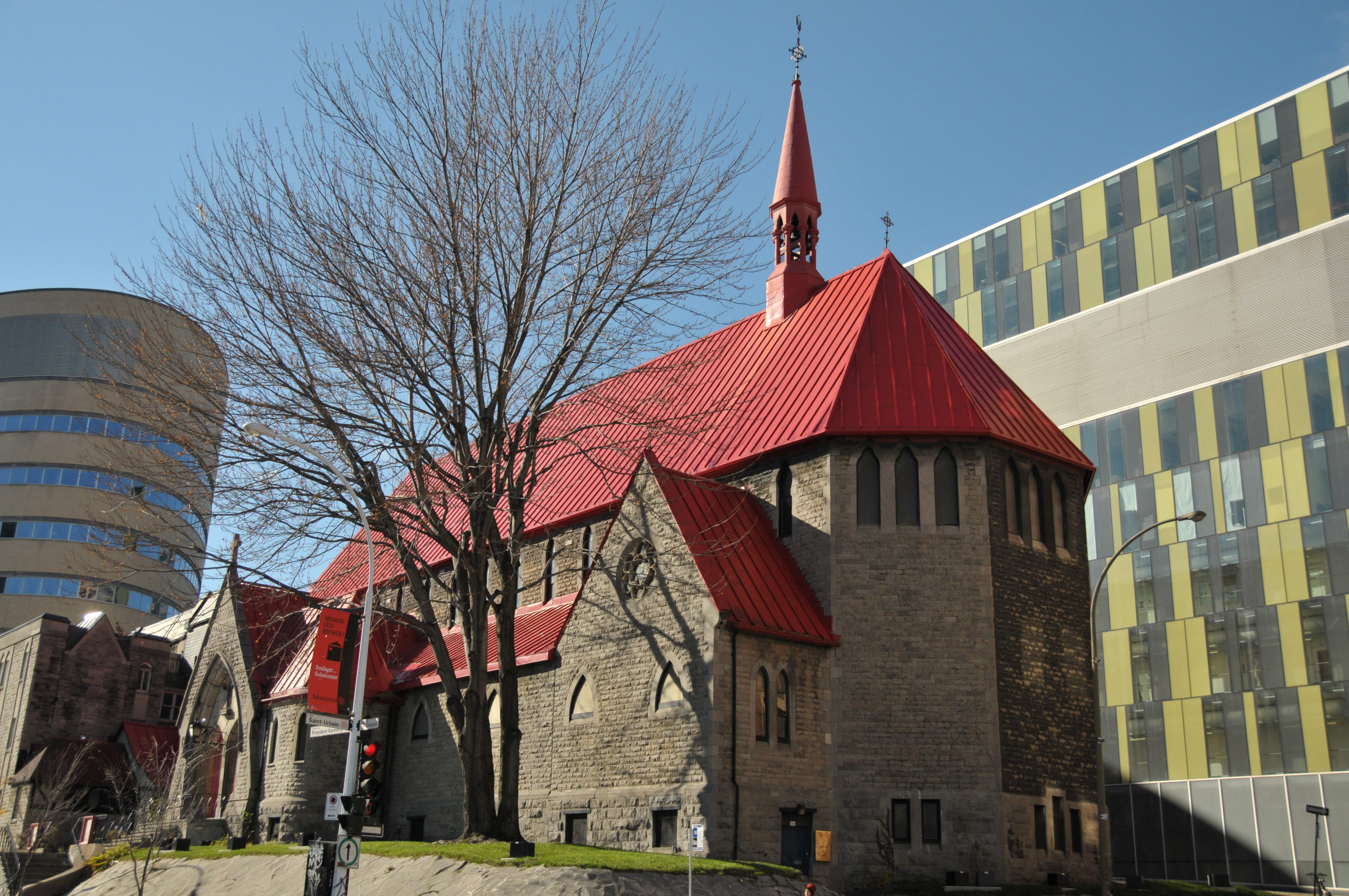
- Church of St. John the Evangelist
- Location: 137 President Kennedy Ave. Montreal, Quebec, Canada
- Denomination: Anglican Church of Canada
- Churchmanship: Anglo-Catholic
- Website: www.redroof.ca

History
- Status: Active
- Founded: 1861
- Founder: Father Edmund Wood
- Dedication: St. John the Evangelist
- Dedicated: 1878
- Consecrated: 1905

Architecture
- Architect: William Tutin Thomas
- Architectural type: Gothic Revival
- Groundbreaking: 1877
- Completed: 1878

Administration
- Province: Canada
- Diocese: Montreal
- Archdeaconry: Montreal
- Deanery: Hochelaga

Clergy
- Bishop: Victor-David Mbuyi Bipungu

St. John the Evangelist is a parish of the Anglican Diocese of Montreal in the Anglican Church of Canada in Montreal, Quebec, Canada. The building is located in downtown Montreal, nested within Université du Québec à Montréal campus buildings and Quartier des Spectacles, at 137 President Kennedy Avenue. The church is often informally known as the "Red Roof Church".

The Church of St. John the Evangelist is often considered to be the Mother church of Canadian Anglo-Catholicism. and is considered to be the first High church in Canada. It was also the first free-seat church in Lower Canada and the only Anglican church in Montreal to foster separarate instutitions, St. John's School, St. Margaret's Home for the Incurables and St. Michael's Mission. Additionally, it was the St. John's was the first Anglican church in Canada to have daily holy communion and to provide absolution as well as the first Anglican church in Montreal to reserve the Blessed Sacrament.

== History ==
The Church of St. John the Evangelist was established in 1861 by Father Edmund Wood, to bring the Oxford Movement to Canada. In 1878, the current church open its doors, on what is now President Kennedy Avenue (formerly Ontario Street).

=== 2020s ===
Necessary repairs to the building have proven to be beyond the financial capacity of the current congregation. Various plans to develop the property have so far not come to fruition, despite several years of efforts by a dedicated committee.

In December 2022, St. Michael's Mission moved to St. George's Anglican Church, where it continues its ministry to the homeless.

An initial vote at a Vestry meeting on April 15, 2023, endorsed a motion to authorize the Diocese to sell the church. The income from the investments after the sale of the church would be used to allow the congregation to maintain its distinctive style of Anglo-Catholic worship in a different place. At a subsequent Vestry meeting on July 16, 2023, this vote was overturned and a committee was set up to explore other options for continuing in the present church without selling the property. The church continues to seek financial aid and development opportunities.

The church has supported various renovations with the assistance of grants from the Conseil du Patrimoine religieux du Québec.

== Liturgy ==
The Church of St. John the Evangelist's orientation is Anglo-Catholic, or High Church, specifically Prayer Book Anglo-Catholicism.

Upon its founding in 1861, it used the 1662 Book of Common Prayer. It never adopted the first Canadian Prayer Book, published in 1918. Under Reverend Canon Davison in 1930, it supplemented the 1662 BCP with St. Hugh's Prayer Book. The 1662 BCP was later replaced by The Churchpeople's Prayer Book (of the Church of Wales in Holy Week of 1938. Its most recent and final change was adopting the more recent Canadian Book of Common Prayer in 1959.

It is the last remaining church in Quebec to maintain this style of worship entirely within the tradition of The Book of Common Prayer (1962).

== Services ==
Solemn High Mass is celebrated on Sundays and feast days and Solemn Evensong and Benediction several Sundays a year. Mass is during the week in French on Tuesdays and in English on Mondays, Thursdays, and Saturdays.

== Tenants ==
St. Michael's Mission was founded by the parish in the 1920s. It was based in the church from the 1960s until 2022.

The parish of Saint-Benoît-de-Nursie, a French-language congregation of the Orthodox Church in America, worshipped in the Chapel of Our Lady of Walsingham in the church's crypt from 1990 to 2020.

== Rectors ==
- Rev. Edmund Wood, Founder
- Rev. Arthur French
- Rev. Canon William Holmes Davison
- Rev. Canon Harold L. Hertzler
- Rev. Paul F.W. Busing
- Rev. Canon Oswald Slattery
- Rev. John-Paul Westin
- Rev. Paul Farthing
- Rev. Canon Keith Schmidt
- Rev. Marc-Philippe Vincent, Priest-in-Charge

== Popular culture ==
The building has starred alongside Nick Nolte in the film Affliction, and in the Quebec science-fiction television series Dans une galaxie près de chez vous. It has also been used as a set for several popular Quebec films, including La Bolduc and Karmina.

== Notable people ==
- Rev. Ellen Bradshaw Aitken, priest
- Rt Rev Russel Brown, Bishop of Quebec
- Brooke Claxton, politician
- Sir Edward Clouston, banker
- Sir George Alexander Drummond, senator
- Heward Grafftey, politician
- Prudence Heward, artist
- John Hamilton, senator
- Sir William Osler, physician
- Grace Julia Parker Drummond, clubwoman and philanthropist
- Rev. Frederick George Scott, poet and curate
- Flora Madeline Shaw, nurse and educator
- Sir Campbell Stuart, newspaper magnate
- Sir William Fenwick Williams, Crimean War general
- Rev. William Wright, physician and curate

== See also ==
- List of Anglo-Catholic Churches
