= Shiney Row =

Coordinates: 54.867120°N 1.495132°W

- Location within Tyne and Wear
- Population: 12,549 (2011.Ward)
- OS grid reference: NZ325525
- Metropolitan borough: City of Sunderland
- Metropolitan county: Tyne and Wear
- Region: North East
- Country: England
- Sovereign state: United Kingdom
- Post town: HOUGHTON LE SPRING
- Postcode district: DH4
- Dialling code: 0191
- Police: Northumbria
- Fire: Tyne and Wear
- Ambulance: North East
- UK Parliament: Houghton and Sunderland South

Shiney Row is a village in Houghton-le-Spring, Tyne and Wear, England. One of the most notable people who was born in Shiney Row is Sir George Elliot, 1st Baronet, owner of the factory that produced the first Transatlantic telegraph cable.

== History ==
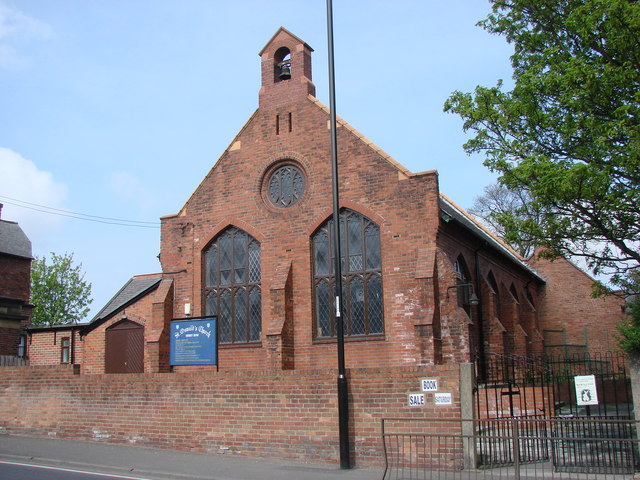
St. Oswald's Church, Shiney Row

Shiney Row's name etymology is debated, and is said to come from Scien Raew, an Old English Term meaning "Row of Trees".

Shiney Row contains 3 Churchs: St. Oswald's Church, Our Lady Queen of Peace Church, and Shiney Row Methodist Church.
