= Houghton-le-Spring =

Town in Tyne and Wear, England

Coordinates: 54.841°N 1.468°W

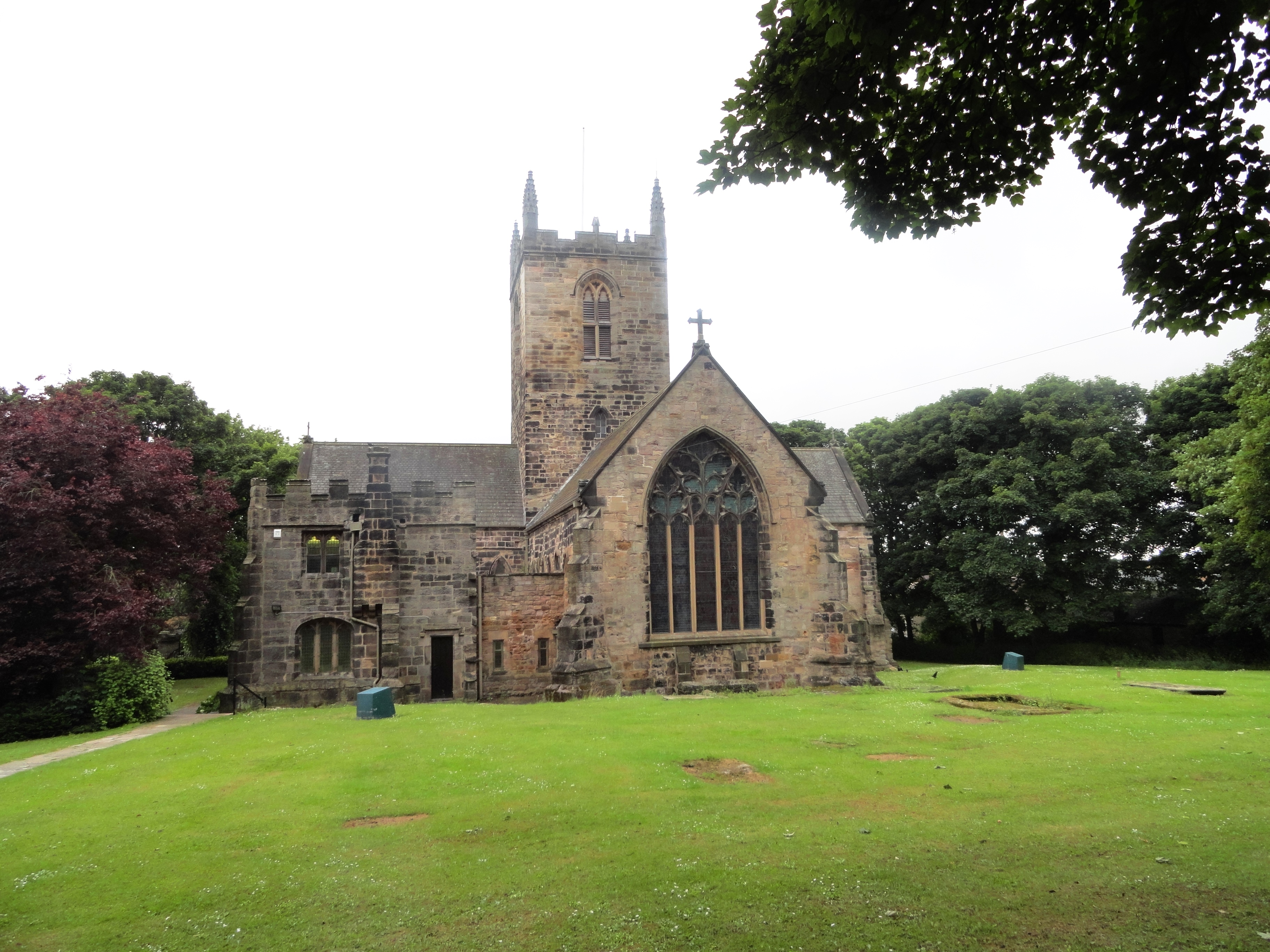
- St Michael and All Angels' Church, Houghton-le-Spring

- Location within Tyne and Wear
- Population: 36,746
- OS grid reference: NZ342497
- Metropolitan borough: Sunderland
- Metropolitan county: Tyne and Wear
- Region: North East
- Country: England
- Sovereign state: United Kingdom
- Post town: HOUGHTON LE SPRING
- Postcode district: DH4, DH5
- Dialling code: 0191
- Police: Northumbria
- Fire: Tyne and Wear
- Ambulance: North East
- UK Parliament: Houghton and Sunderland South

Houghton-le-Spring (/ˈhoʊtən li ˈsprɪŋ/ HOH-tən-lee-SPRING) is a town within Sunderland, England which has its recorded origins in Norman times. Historically in County Durham.

It lies seven miles from Durham, 7 miles (11 kilometres). Seaham is also 5 mi (8 km) directly east. The villages and towns of Newbottle, Fencehouses and Hetton-le-Hole lie nearby. It had a population of 36,746.

Other villages within the Houghton-le-Spring postal district include: Philadelphia, Penshaw, Shiney Row, Chilton Moor and Woodstone Village.

== History ==
The earliest mention of the town's name is in the Boldon Book in 1183 as 'Hoctona'. An English transcription states:

In Houghton are thirteen cottagers, whose tenures, works and payments are like those of Newbotill; and three other half cottagers, who also work like the three half cottagers of Newbotill. Henry the greeve, holds two oxgangs of 24 acres [10 hectares] for his service. The smith – 12 acres [5 ha] for his service. The carpenter holds a toft and 4 acres [2 ha] for his service. The punder (one who impounds straying animals) has 20 acres [8 ha] and the thraves of Houghton, Wardon and Morton; he renders 60 hens and 300 eggs. The mills of Newbotill and Bidic, with half of Raynton Mill, pay XV marks. The demesne, consisting of four carucates and the sheep pastures are in the hands of the lord.

An ancient document dated 1220 describes the town as 'Houghton Sprynges'. The name Houghton comes from the Old English hoh meaning hill and tun meaning settlement.

During excavations under the church of St Michael and All Angels in 2008–09 as part of the church's refurbishment, not only were Roman remains discovered but some very ancient stones which suggest that the area has been settled since prehistoric times and that the site of the church has had some religious significance for thousands rather than hundreds of years. Glass inserts in the new floor of the church enable some of these to be seen.

Arms of Le Spring family of Houghton-le-Spring: Argent, an escutcheon in an orle of martlets sable

In 1311, the village was owned by Albreda, widow of Sir Henry Spring, hence the addition of 'le spring'. That explanation of the addition of 'le Spring' is debatable and there are alternatives. One opinion is that it is derived from the Le Spring family, Lords of Houghton in ancient times. Another explanation, which is backed up by a "Regester Booke belonginge to the Paryshe of Houghton in the Springe" from 1598, is based around the medicinal springs which flow from the surrounding limestone rocks. This latter explanation ties in with the Roman names in the area in which "le" is taken to be "in the" as in Chester-le-Street, Witton-le-Wear, Dalton-le-Dale, Hetton-le-Hole. Credence is added to this consideration by the area of the town formerly known as the Lake and the stream/spring that nowadays still runs through the centre of the town, although this has long since been directed to run through a culvert.

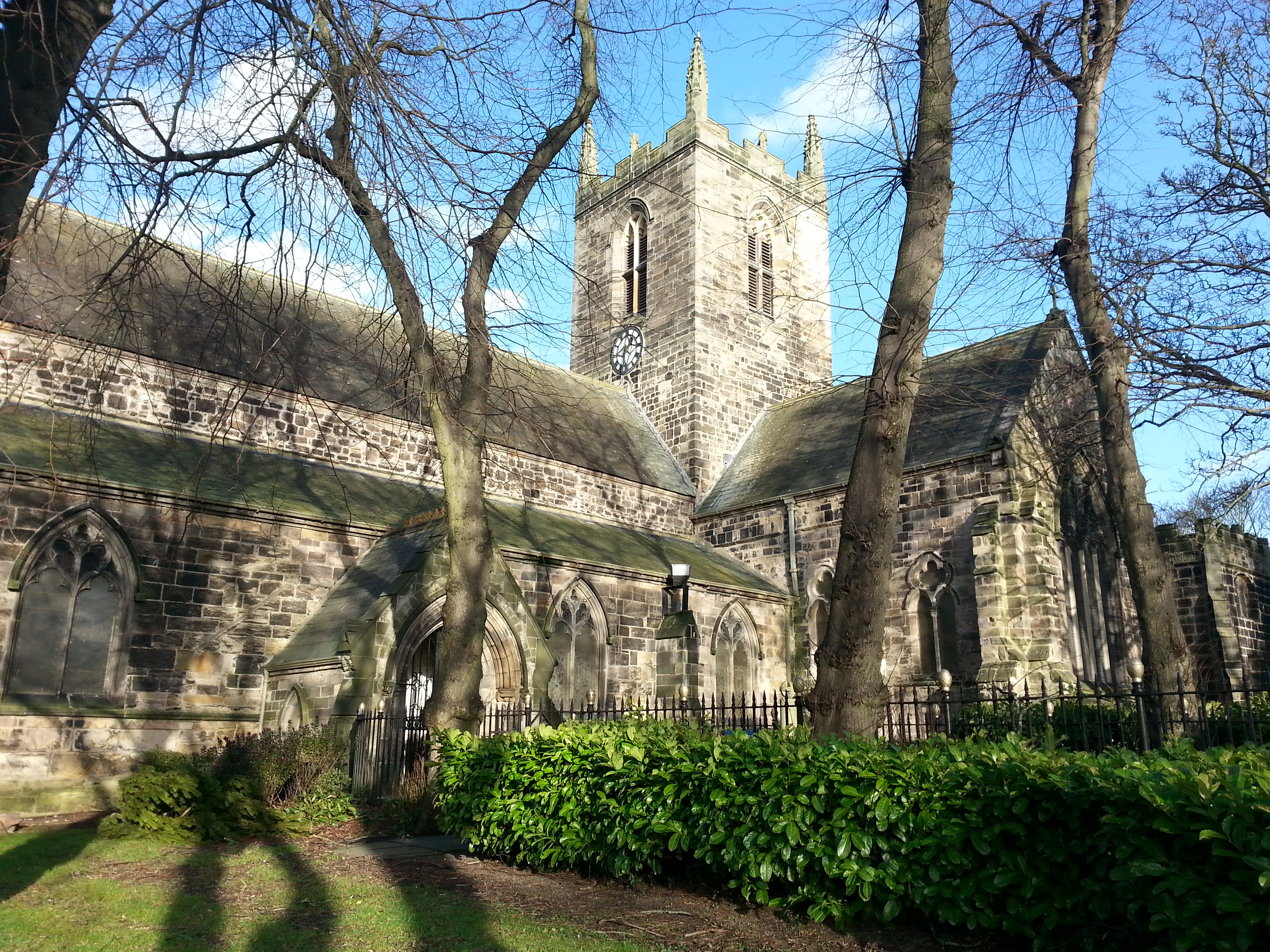
St Michael and All Angels

The parish church of St Michael and All Angels dates back to Norman times and contains the tomb of Bernard Gilpin, known as 'the Apostle of the North'. Gilpin was Archdeacon of Durham and in 1557 became the rector at Houghton-le-Spring, which at that time was one of the largest parishes in England.

During World War II, Houghton was relatively unscathed from the German bombing raids, though some fleeing German planes did jettison their loads after bombing attempts on the nearby coastal town of Sunderland.

Houghton was an active coal-mining town. The local mine began to sink its first shaft in 1823 and was active until its closure in 1981. At its peak in the early 20th century, the pit employed over two thousand workers.

== Houghton Feast ==
Houghton Feast is a festival held every October in the town. It has its origins in the 12th century as a dedication festival to the parish church of St Michael & All Angels. The festival lasts ten days and typically features a fairground, carnival, fireworks and an ox-roasting event in commemoration of Rector Bernard Gilpin's feeding of the poor. It was expanded in the 16th century by Gilpin and again in the late 18th century when it became connected with horse racing.

== Today ==
Houghton-le-Spring's main shopping area is Newbottle Street, with some businesses branching off onto nearby streets for example Mautland Street, Sunderland Street, Church Street and Durham Road. The White Lion pub is the last of four 'Lion' houses, with the other three having been drastically redeveloped as new businesses or demolished in the 1960s.

Kepier Academy, formerly Kepier School, is the main secondary school serving the town.

== Notable people ==
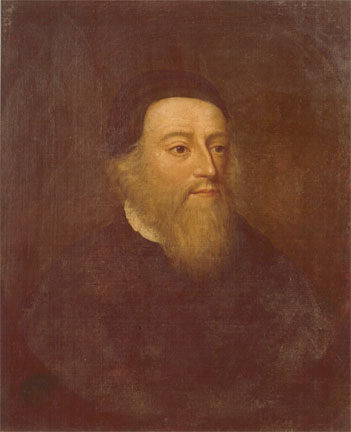
Bernard Gilpin, Apostle of the North was associated with the town

- Mary Ann Cotton, Britain's first female serial killer
- David "Jaff" Craig, musician, from rock band "The Futureheads"
- Charlotte Crosby, reality television star, notably in the MTV show Geordie Shore
- Michael Adams, CBBC presenter
- Anthony ‘Frankie’ Francis, musician, from "Frankie & the Heartstrings", and also radio DJ
- Bernard Gilpin (1517–1583), Apostle of the North, was associated with the town
- Johnny Hartburn (1920–2001), former QPR, Millwall Leyton Orient, left wing footballer
- Trevor Horn, music producer
- David Knight, footballer
- Paul Mullen, musician
- Chris Penman, footballer
- Poppy Pattinson, footballer
- Sheila Quigley, novelist
- Jonathan Reynolds, current Secretary of State for Business and Trade
- William Sancroft, later Archbishop of Canterbury, briefly held the living of Houghton-le-Spring in 1661–1662
- Gordon Scurfield, biologist
- William Shanks (1812–1882), amateur mathematician, worked out the value of π to 707 decimals (of which the first 527 were correct) while living in Houghton
- Trevor Swinburne, former Sunderland, Carlisle, Brentford, Leeds and Lincoln goalkeeper
- Linden Travers (1913–2001), actress
- Shallet Turner (1692–1762), a famously idle Cambridge academic, was educated at Houghton
