= Fence Houses =

Village in Tyne and Wear, England

Coordinates: 54.843°N 1.500°W

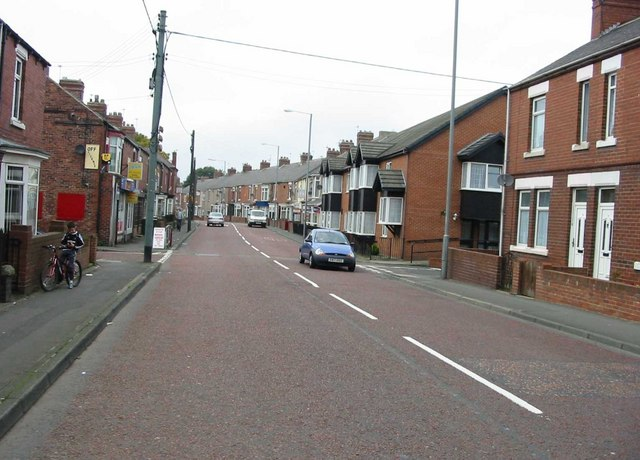
- Fencehouses

- Location within Tyne and Wear
- OS grid reference: NZ321499
- Metropolitan borough: City of Sunderland
- Metropolitan county: Tyne and Wear
- Region: North East
- Country: England
- Sovereign state: United Kingdom
- Post town: HOUGHTON LE SPRING
- Postcode district: DH4
- Dialling code: 0191
- Police: Northumbria
- Fire: Tyne and Wear
- Ambulance: North East
- UK Parliament: Houghton and Sunderland South

Fence Houses, or Fencehouses is a village in the City of Sunderland in Tyne and Wear, England.

It came into existence when Napoleonic prisoners were housed on the outskirts of Houghton-le-Spring. The prisoners were used as labour to cut a path through the hill at Houghton-le-Spring in order to get the troops from Durham to the coast at Sunderland. Houghton Cut as it became known has now been expanded to carry a 4-lane road, the A690. The place the prisoners were housed was known as "The French Houses" and this later changed to "Fencehouses".

This origin is highly debatable. A more likely origin was put forward by the late Houghton-le-Spring historian, C.A. Smith MA, in an article in the Official Houghton-le-Spring Urban District Handbook, 1962, as:

Fence Houses derives its name from Biddick Fence which formed the southern boundary of South Biddick and included Burnmoor

The land was originally part of the Grange (a large local manor house). In about 1950, a modern housing estate was added to the village it, called the Grange estate.

A railway line was built, bringing a 2-platform station providing services to Sunderland, Newcastle upon Tyne and Durham, and a stock yard from which local farmers shipped their cattle by train. The station opened in 1836, and the Post Office two years later as a Railway Sorting Office. The line closed to passengers in May 1964, apart from a one-day service for the Durham Miners Gala that year.

In the 1960s. Fence Houses had the largest telephone exchange in the area (The Police house at Shiney Row 4 miles (6.4 km) away had the number "Fencehouses 55" in the 1940s). In the 1980s the Fence Houses exchange numbers became the Durham exchange numbers.

The village is essentially a single main street cut in two by the path of the old railway line which also splits the village into control of two local authorities – Sunderland Council for the south of the village and Durham to the north). This is believed to be one of the only villages to split by local authorities in England with the North part of Fence Houses, County Durham and the South part of Fence Houses, Tyne and Wear.
