= Thrum =

Thrum may refer to:

- Thrum (band), Scottish indie rock band
- Thrum (botany), a flower morph
- Thrum (material), small lengths of wool or yarn
- Thrum Hall, a rugby league stadium in Halifax, West Yorkshire, England
- Thrum Mill, Rothbury, Northumberland, England, a restored former water mill
- Thomas George Thrum (20th century), American bookman
- Thrum, a 2017 album by Joe Henry

== See also ==
- Thrums, a community in British Columbia, Canada
- Thrumming (disambiguation)
