= 2010 Northumbria Police manhunt =

UK police operation

- Raoul Moat
- Location: Tyne and Wear and Northumberland, England
- Date: 3–10 July 2010
- Attack type: Shootings, manhunt
- Weapon: Sawn-off shotgun
- Deaths: 2 (including the perpetrator)
- Injuries: 2
- Perpetrator: Raoul Moat
- Motive: Anti-police sentiment

A manhunt was conducted across Tyne and Wear and Northumberland from 3 to 10 July 2010 with the objective of apprehending fugitive Raoul Moat. After killing one person and wounding two others in a two-day shooting spree, the 37-year-old ex-prisoner went on the run for nearly a week. The manhunt concluded when Moat died by suicide having shot himself near the town of Rothbury, Northumberland, following a six-hour standoff with armed police officers under the command of the Northumbria Police.

Moat's victims were ex-girlfriend Samantha Stobbart, her new partner Chris Brown, and police officer David Rathband. Stobbart was hospitalised and Brown was killed, while Rathband remained in hospital for nearly three weeks and was permanently blinded, before taking his own life on 29 February 2012. Moat shot the three with a sawn-off shotgun, two days after his release from Durham Prison.

After six days on the run, Moat was recognised by police and contained in the open, leading to a standoff. After nearly six hours of negotiation, Moat was shot with an experimental "wireless long-range electric shock weapon" firing electrified rounds, which proved ineffective. Moat then shot himself in the head; he was later pronounced dead at Newcastle General Hospital. Following an inquest, it was ruled by a jury that Moat's death was a suicide and Northumbria Police were found to have been at no fault.

The manhunt began after the shootings of Stobbart and Brown in the early hours of 3 July 2010 in Birtley. Nearly 22 hours later, the shooting of traffic police officer Rathband, parked in East Denton, was linked to Moat, who was believed to have held a grudge against the police after Stobbart tried to protect herself and Brown by lying to Moat that Brown was a police officer. Shortly after his release from prison, Moat posted threats to police and others on his Facebook profile.

Moat apparently targeted Rathband randomly, simply for being a police officer, although on an earlier occasion Rathband had confiscated Moat's van on the suspicion that it was not insured. Moat also made threats, in two letters and several phone calls, that he would kill any officer who attempted to stop him. Both the police and some of Moat's relatives made several appeals for Moat to give himself up for the sake of his children. After a sighting on the night of 5 July in an armed robbery at Seaton Delaval, on 6 July it was announced that Moat was believed to be in Rothbury. The manhunt remained focused there with several further suspected sightings, until the final confrontation at Riverside, Rothbury.

The manhunt lasted almost seven days, and was the largest in modern British history, involving 160 armed officers and armed response vehicles, many seconded for the operation from other police forces. Police also used sniper teams, helicopters, dogs, armoured anti-terrorist police vehicles from Northern Ireland, tracker Ray Mears, and even a Royal Air Force jet for reconnaissance. In the course of the hunt, there were several raids and false alarms across the region. With Moat believed to be sleeping rough, police found his abandoned camp-sites and property as he evaded capture. Armed guards were also posted outside Rothbury schools after police announced that they believed Moat posed a threat to the wider public. Several people were arrested during the hunt and after Moat's death, suspected of assisting him with equipment, information, and in evading capture and selecting targets.

On 5 July, Northumbria Police announced that Durham Prison had told them three days earlier that Moat intended to harm his ex-girlfriend. As a result, Northumbria Police voluntarily referred the case to the Independent Police Complaints Commission (IPCC). Following the final confrontation, the IPCC expanded the investigation to include the immediate events leading up to Moat's death but ruled out investigating how the manhunt itself had been conducted.

== Background ==
Raoul Thomas Moat (17 June 1973 – 10 July 2010) was a panel beater, bouncer, and tree surgeon from Newcastle upon Tyne, Tyne and Wear. His mother reportedly had bipolar disorder, and he and his half-brother Angus were mostly brought up by their grandmother as their mother spent much time in mental hospitals. Prior to the shootings, Moat had attempted to get psychiatric help.

Between February and July 2010, Moat served an eighteen-week sentence in Durham Prison for assaulting a nine-year-old relative. A former bodybuilder, Moat was said to be 6 ft 3 in (1.90 m) tall and approximately 17 st (108 kg or 238 lb), who was prone to "eruptions of anger". He had a young daughter with his ex-girlfriend, Samantha Stobbart, who was 22 at the time of the shootings, and two other children from a previous relationship. Although Moat had been arrested twelve times resulting in charges for seven separate offences, he only had one previous conviction for common assault.

Moat apparently held a grudge against the police, whom he blamed for the collapse of his business, claiming that he had "lost everything". While in prison, Stobbart lied to him that her new partner was a police officer because she was frightened of him. Moat is known to have posted threats to police and others on social media shortly after being released from prison. He made further detailed threats in two subsequent letters and several phone calls to police stating he had no intention of harming the public but would continue to shoot police officers until he was dead.

== Events ==
Key locations
1 July – Durham Prison (not shown, south of this map)
3 July – Birtley
4 July – East Denton
5 July – Seaton Delaval
6 July – Wrekenton and Rothbury
9 July – Rothbury

=== First shootings ===
Moat was released from Durham Prison on 1 July and allegedly arrived in the early hours of 3 July 2010 at a house in Birtley where Stobbart and her new partner, 29-year-old karate instructor Chris Brown, were visiting. Brown had moved to the area from Windsor, Berkshire, around six months previously. According to Moat, he crouched under the open window of the living room for an hour and a half, listening to Stobbart and Brown mocking him. At 2:40 am, Brown left the house to confront Moat but was shot at close range with a shotgun, and killed. Moat then fired through the living room window while Stobbart's mother was on the phone to the police. Stobbart was hit in the arm and abdomen and was taken to hospital to undergo liver surgery and put under armed guard.

=== Second shooting ===
At 12:45 am on 4 July, Police Constable David Rathband was shot while sitting in a police vehicle on the roundabout of the A1 and A69 roads near East Denton. Rathband was taken to Newcastle General Hospital in a critical condition with injuries to his head and upper body. The Guardian reported that Moat had called police 12 minutes before shooting PC Rathband to taunt them and tell them what he was about to do. He did so again some 50 minutes after the shooting, during which he showed little remorse and complained the police are "not taking me seriously enough". Police responded by saying they were taking him seriously and that Brown had no connection to the police. They urged him to hand himself in for the sake of his three children.

==== Death of victim ====
Just over 18 months after the shooting, David Rathband, who had struggled to come to terms with his blindness, was found hanged at his Blyth home on 29 February 2012, having died by suicide. His funeral service at Stafford Crematorium was attended by family and fellow police officers on 16 March 2012.

In June, he had been due to carry the Olympic torch as part of the 2012 Summer Olympics torch relay. His daughter, Mia, who replaced him, chose to run blindfolded in tribute to her father. Rathband had spearheaded the Blue Lamp Foundation, which was started by him and his identical twin Darren whilst he was recovering from his injuries. The charity assists emergency staff injured in the line of duty.

=== Police response ===
The manhunt became one of the largest in the UK. A total of 160 armed officers were deployed to find Moat, which represented approximately 10% of those available in England and Wales at any one time. (Of the 6,780 authorised firearms officers in England and Wales at the time, a quarter would be available for duty at any one time due to shift patterns.)

Under mutual aid arrangements, Northumbria Police is able to call on reinforcements from other forces by paying the donor force for the assistance given. The 100 specially trained armed response officers of Northumbria Police were reinforced by an additional 40 from London's Metropolitan Police, and another 20 from Cleveland, Cumbria, West Yorkshire, South Yorkshire, Humberside, Strathclyde, and Greater Manchester combined.

On 7 July, at least ten armoured anti-terrorist vehicles from the Police Service of Northern Ireland were transported by ferry and provided to Northumbria Police for the operation. The Ministry of Defence confirmed a Royal Air Force Tornado GR4, fitted with a RAPTOR reconnaissance pod, was deployed to do night-time sweeps with an infrared camera around the Rothbury area.

=== Letter, sightings and appeals ===
On 5 July, fearful of more shootings by Moat, police mounted a raid with armed officers, dogs and a helicopter on a house in North Kenton, and also detained a man from Sunderland, although neither action found Moat.

Northumbria Police confirmed they had received a 49-page letter, originally given by Moat to a friend late on 3 July, warning that they were "gonna pay for what they've done". The letter also stated that "The public need not fear me but the police should as I won't stop till I'm dead." In the letter, he stated that his children, freedom, house, then his ex-partner and their daughter, had all been taken from him. He admitted that he had issues and was running out of options, he said he was never violent towards his children.

The police relayed a message to Moat from Stobbart through the media which urged him not to continue if he still loved her and their child. Stobbart then admitted she had lied to him about seeing a police officer, because she was frightened. Sam Stobbart's half-sister reported that Moat had updated his Facebook status with a "hit list" which included her and other family members. "He's said he will take out any police that get in his way".

At a press conference on the evening of 5 July, police revealed that they believed Moat had kidnapped two men at the time of the shootings. They also requested this information be subject to a media blackout. Around 10:50 pm, a fish and chip shop at Seaton Delaval was the scene of an armed robbery by a man resembling Moat. In a press conference on the morning of 6 July, the police said they believed they had been dealing with a "complex, fast-moving hostage situation".

=== Rothbury ===
On the morning of 6 July, a house in Wrekenton was raided by police and a man was detained.

Following an appeal for sightings of a black Lexus IS 200 SE saloon, bearing the registration V322 HKX, believed to have been used by Moat, the car was found near Rothbury. A 5-mile (8.0 km), 5,000-foot (1,500 m) air exclusion zone and a 2-mile (3.2 km) ground exclusion zone was set up by police, and two men were found walking along a road and were initially thought to be the hostages, but were later arrested.

Police also said that officers from six forces had been called into the area, a large number of armed response officers were in their ranks. Armed officers and dogs stormed buildings on a disused farm called Pike House after a tip-off from the landowners, who said that one of the boards on the windows of the derelict building had been removed, but no suspect was found. The police repeated an appeal to Moat to give himself up, and urged him not to leave his children with distressing memories of their father.

Armed officers were deployed to schools across the area and pupils were kept under temporary lockdown for fear that Moat might be close by; children were eventually allowed home. The cordon around Rothbury was lifted at approximately 9 pm while armed patrols continued throughout the village, and vehicles were subjected to road checks whilst entering and leaving.

=== Further appeals and reward ===
In another press conference on the morning of 7 July, the police said they believed that Moat was still at large mostly likely hiding in the surrounding countryside in the Rothbury area. Within a tent thought to have been used by Moat at a secluded spot in Cartington, an eight-page letter to Sam Stobbart from Moat was found. In it, Moat continued to assert that Brown was connected to the police, again denied by Detective Chief Superintendent Adamson. The police called in TV survival expert Ray Mears to help track Moat's movements.

At the later press conferences, the police confirmed the 5 July chip shop robbery was a positive sighting of Moat. Northumbria Police offered a £10,000 reward for information that would lead to Moat's arrest. During the day, Samantha's father released a video appealing to Moat to turn himself in.

The police announced on 8 July that two more men were arrested in Rothbury the previous day. Detective Chief Superintendent Neil Adamson of Northumbria Police said they considered Moat a wider threat to the public than previously thought, but would not comment further. It had been previously reported that Moat was targeting only the police, and not the public, after his initial note stating that he would not stop killing police until he was dead. Following Moat's death, it was revealed that police asked the media to dampen the reporting on aspects of Moat's private life, as he had threatened to kill a member of the public every time there was an inaccurate report.

=== Discovery and death ===
On 9 July, a cordon was set up around the National Trust's Cragside estate in the parish of Cartington. Northumbria Police reported they had recovered three mobile phones used by Moat in recent days.

In the early evening of 9 July, residents of Rothbury were told to stay indoors because a major security operation was taking place. News agencies reported that an individual resembling Moat had been surrounded by police, and was holding a gun to his head. With a 110-yard (100 m) cordon established on the north bank of the River Coquet, close to a rainwater culvert which runs under the village, police negotiated with the suspect, who was holding a sawn-off shotgun to his neck. Food and water were reportedly brought to Moat during the confrontation, and his best friend Tony Laidler was escorted to the scene by authorities in an attempt to persuade him to surrender.

At one stage former England footballer Paul Gascoigne arrived at the crime scene, claiming to know Moat and offering to bring him "chicken and lager" in an attempt to convince him to surrender; Gascoigne was denied access to the fugitive. It was later revealed that Gascoigne had been under the influence of alcohol and drugs. It has been rumoured that Gascoigne also wanted to persuade Moat to "go fishing" with him, and that he had mistaken Moat for his "friend".

At approximately 1:15 am on 10 July, news agencies reported that at least one shot had been fired in the vicinity of the stand-off. At 1:34 am, a police spokesman stated that "a shot or shots" had been fired and the suspect had a gunshot wound. It was reported by multiple sources that police jumped on the suspect, and that police and an ambulance were seen moving toward the site. A statement from Northumbria Police said that no shots were fired by police officers and that the suspect had shot himself; no officers were injured in the stand-off. Moat was transferred to an ambulance and taken to Newcastle General Hospital, where he was pronounced dead at 2:20 am, shortly after arrival.

== Inquest ==
On 13 July an inquest was opened and adjourned into Moat's death in Newcastle upon Tyne. The coroner declared the cause of death was a gunshot wound to the head. A senior IPCC investigator told the inquest that during the final confrontation, Moat had been shot by two officers from West Yorkshire Police with Taser guns in an apparent attempt to prevent Moat from killing himself, although, at that time, it was still not clear whether the Tasers were fired before or after Moat turned his gun on himself. The IPCC stated to the inquest that the type of Taser used was a long-range XREP Taser, which operates without wires. A Home Office spokesman said the XREP Tasers were "currently subject to testing by the Home Office Scientific Development Branch".

In September 2010, it was found that Pro-Tect Systems, the company that had supplied the Tasers, had breached its licence by supplying the "experimental" weapons directly to the police. The Home Secretary, Theresa May, subsequently revoked the firm's licence after confirming that the Tasers were never officially approved for use. On 1 October 2010, former policeman Peter Boatman, a director of Pro-Tect systems, was found dead at his home. The incident was treated by police as a presumed suicide; they referred the matter to the coroner. A colleague of Boatman was reported as saying that he was a "proud man" who had felt "ashamed" at the recent developments.

In September 2011 an inquest jury returned a verdict of suicide. The IPCC then issued a report clearing the police of wrongdoing in firing a Taser at Moat.

== Associated arrests ==
A number of arrests were made both during the hunt for Moat, and after his death, as part of police attempts to capture anyone who had any involvement in Moat's offences.

The first arrest was of a man from Sunderland, who was arrested in North Kenton on 5 July but later released without charge, as was the man arrested on 6 July in Wrekenton.

On 6 July, two men were arrested in Rothbury, after police initially believed them to have been Moat's hostages, but were then arrested on suspicion of conspiracy to commit murder and possession of a firearm with intent. DCS Neil Adamson reported that police had initially believed there had been a "significant threat to the lives of the two men". They were later released on bail pending further enquiries. On 8 July, the two men were named as bodybuilder Karl Ness, aged 26, from Dudley, North Tyneside, and Qhuram "Sean" Awan, aged 23, from Blyth, when they appeared at Newcastle Magistrates' Court charged with conspiracy to commit murder and possession of a firearm with intent. It was alleged that the men had supplied the gun to Moat and were both with him when he shot PC Rathband on 4 July and that Ness had accompanied Moat during the initial shooting of Stobbart and Brown. Prosecution counsel Paul Simpson further alleged the two men had actively helped Moat look for policemen to shoot on 4 July.

At around 6pm on 7 July, police arrested two further suspects in the case, "in the vicinity of Rothbury on suspicion of assisting an offender". Police said the following day, "Both men are currently in custody and we are pursuing a range of inquiries in relation to this matter." They were later released on bail.

On the afternoon of 8 July, police arrested a man and a woman in the Blyth area on suspicion of assisting an offender.

Following Moat's death, three more people were arrested on 13 July for allegedly assisting him, with three men detained at two addresses in Newcastle upon Tyne and one in Gateshead. This brought the number of arrests in relation to the manhunt to ten, with police unable to rule out further arrests in future.

On 14 July, another three men were arrested during the day on suspicion of helping Moat; it brought the number of arrests to 13. The following day, police arrested two men aged 28 and 36 in the Newcastle area on suspicion of assisting Moat, later releasing them on bail. This brought the total number of arrests to 15, with two charged, and eight released on bail. Another four were arrested on 20 July, bringing the total to 20.

=== Convictions ===
Karl Ness, 26, was given three concurrent life sentences totalling a minimum tariff of 40 years for the murder of Christopher Brown, conspiracy to murder and the attempted murder of PC David Rathband. His friend Qhuram Awan received two concurrent life sentences for conspiracy to murder and the attempted murder of PC David Rathband and will serve at least 20 years in jail. Both men were also sentenced to seven years for robbery and Ness was given five years for a firearms offence. Ness, from Dudley in North Tyneside, was with Moat on the night he shot his ex-girlfriend Samantha Stobbart and killed her new boyfriend Chris Brown whom Ness had believed at the time was a policeman.

== Media coverage ==
=== Copycat killings ===
Moat may have been inspired by the events in the Cumbria shootings which occurred one month before his rampage, when taxi driver Derrick Bird killed 12 people and injured 11 others in a day-long shooting spree. The "saturation-level news coverage" of the Cumbria shootings may have triggered Moat given the timing of his killings. Research by American forensic psychiatrist Park Dietz has demonstrated that, in a country the size of the United States, such coverage "causes, on average, one more mass murder in the next two weeks". News organisations were accused of being more concerned with revenue than the harm their headlines might cause. The theory that mass-media coverage prompted copycat offences because it gave killers infamy was also supported by Kate Painter, a criminology expert at the University of Cambridge.

=== Sensationalism ===
The media was also accused of glamorising Moat with descriptions of him such as "having a hulking physique" and being "a notorious hard man", while providing less coverage about his victims. During some coverage, Sky News had used police-issue body armour and Heckler & Koch semiautomatic carbines as studio props. Belfast Telegraph observed that by 8 July the manhunt was continuing to receive "saturation coverage on radio and television". The Guardian also wrote that, to the news media, Moat had become "a valuable commodity, his actions tracked by millions".

Following Moat's death, his estranged older brother Angus described the media coverage as "the whipping up to what could be a public execution in modern Britain".

In The Daily Telegraph, Theodore Dalrymple wrote:

The late Mr Moat was a brutal sentimentalist. He used the extremity of his behaviour to persuade himself that he felt something – supposedly love – very deeply, and that this was the motive and justification of his behaviour. Surely, if he was prepared to kill not only his ex-girlfriend Samantha Stobbart, but also her new lover and anyone who looked like him, he must have loved her very much?

He also persuaded himself that he was the victim of this terrible episode. "They took it all from me", he said, "kids, freedom, house, then Sam and Chanel [his daughter]. Where could I go from there?" It was only natural that he, an innocent, or at least a man not seriously at fault ("I've never punched her but have slapped her"), should have taken a gun and killed one and injured two: any man treated in this way would have done the same.

What is alarming is that substantial numbers of people take this self-serving sentimental nonsense seriously, at least if the thousands of postings on the Moat Facebook tribute page, which was deleted on Thursday, were anything to go by. The logic seems to be as follows: Mr Moat called himself a victim; victims are heroes; therefore Mr Moat was a hero.

The demand for coverage resulted in the news desk at AOL mistaking a satirical article about the manhunt's media coverage for a genuine news report, posting:

As officers and dogs move in, citizens from around the isle are anticipating a swift and gruesome conclusion to the national drama. Some are even clamouring for it, calling it the best live entertainment they’ve seen in some time ... Families have been collecting children from schools and nurseries throughout the day so they could watch together, as expectations reached fever pitch that a violent firearms confrontation was imminent. Over 800 schools have closed across the country as a result.

The original author of the spoof article, Robin Brown, commented: "Maybe it's just a sign that, in these information-saturated days, even the news is beyond satire?"

=== Press blackout request ===
On 8 July the police requested a news blackout, under the terms of a voluntary agreement between the Association of Chief Police Officers and the media, about Moat's personal life as they believed such coverage would provoke him to kill more people. This followed the discovery of a dictaphone in Moat's tent near Wagtail Farm, which contained a four-hour-long message to the police. In it Moat revealed that he had been following the media coverage in newspapers and had been "upset" by some of the negative articles written about him.

Detective Chief Superintendent Neil Adamson told reporters: "We recovered a Dictaphone with four hours of ramblings from somebody. We don't think it is a decoy, but we're not absolutely sure. We are sure it has been made within one or two days of the shootings and the print coverage has really made him upset. There is talk of people who are being spoken to not being right and it's winding him up." The police revealed that Moat had threatened to kill a member of the public for every piece of inaccurate information published about him, and journalists were thought to be among his targets. Police also asked for articles already published about Moat's personal life to be removed from news websites, although this was said by The Guardian to be impossible due to the rolling nature and vast amount of coverage the manhunt had generated.

In reference to the police request for a news blackout following the discovery of Moat's dictaphone recording, The Guardian wrote that the rolling coverage resembled "a real-life Truman Show with every development tracked around the world in blogs, on websites and mobile networking sites like Twitter".

=== Social media ===
The Belfast Telegraph wrote on 8 July that "Outside interest in the case continued to grow...there are now more than 20 Facebook sites dedicated to the hunt and "Raoul Moat" was yesterday the No 1 trending topic on Twitter". On 10 July The Guardian referred to Twitter to reflect on the mass media coverage of the manhunt, writing "As one poster on Twitter put it: "I see Raoul Moat has got his own TV show. The News".

After Moat's death, responding to a question at Prime Minister's Question Time on 14 July regarding a particular Raoul Moat memorial page established on Facebook, which had attracted more than 36,500 members, Prime Minister David Cameron condemned the site. He told the House of Commons; "It is absolutely clear that Raoul Moat was a callous murderer, full stop, end of story. ... I cannot understand any wave, however small, of public sympathy for this man. ... There should be sympathy for his victims and the havoc he wreaked in that community. ... There should be no sympathy for him". Facebook later responded by saying that it would not remove the site because it encourages public debate about issues in the media. "Facebook is a place where people can express their views and discuss things in an open way as they can and do in many other places. And as such we sometimes find people discussing topics others may find distasteful, however, that is not a reason in itself to stop a debate from happening. We believe that enabling people to have these different opinions and debate about a topic can help bring together lots of different views for a healthy discussion".

Cameron later said he would be making an official complaint to Facebook. The page was deleted by its creator on 15 July.

== IPCC investigation ==
Aspects of the operation were investigated by the Independent Police Complaints Commission (IPCC), the independent body for handling complaints made against police forces in England and Wales. Some findings of the IPCC investigation formed part of the official inquest convened by the coroner to determine Moat's cause of death. One IPCC report was published at the conclusion of the inquest and a draft of the second was leaked in April 2012.

During the course of the manhunt, Northumbria Police had announced that they had been warned by Durham Prison in the afternoon of Friday, 2 July, that Moat intended to seriously harm his girlfriend, with the Birtley shootings occurring in the early hours of Saturday, the next day. As a result, Temporary Chief Constable Sue Sim announced Northumbria Police would be voluntarily referring the case to the IPCC for investigation. Following Moat's death in Rothbury, it was announced that the IPCC investigation would be expanded to focus on two parts of the Northumbria Police operation – whether police could have warned Stobbart she was in danger, and the handling of the events leading to Moat's death including the discharge of two Tasers by police. The IPCC stated it would not be investigating how the manhunt itself was conducted. In 2014, Northumbria Police denied IPCC findings that it had failed to act on intelligence about Moat or support the injured Rathband.

== ITV drama series ==
On 21 April 2022, ITV announced that filming had started on the 3 episode drama series The Hunt for Raoul Moat. It was produced by ITV Studios owned World Productions for ITV1 and written by Kevin Sampson, stars Lee Ingleby as Detective Chief Superintendent Neil Adamson, and Matt Stokoe as Raoul Moat. Filming took place in the Allerton neighbourhood of Bradford, at Wetherby Police Station in the Leeds town of Wetherby, and other unspecified areas of Yorkshire. It was broadcast over three consecutive nights, the first being 16 April 2023 and is currently available on ITVx.

== See also ==
- Lists
  - List of massacres in Great Britain
  - List of rampage killers
- Similar shootings in the United Kingdom
  - West Bromwich and Nuneaton shootings (1978)
  - Hungerford massacre (1987)
  - Monkseaton shootings (1989)
  - Dunblane massacre (1996)
  - Cumbria shootings (2010)
- Fiction
  - Southcliffe
