= Rothbury =

Market town in Northumberland, England

Coordinates: 55.3097°N 1.9109°W

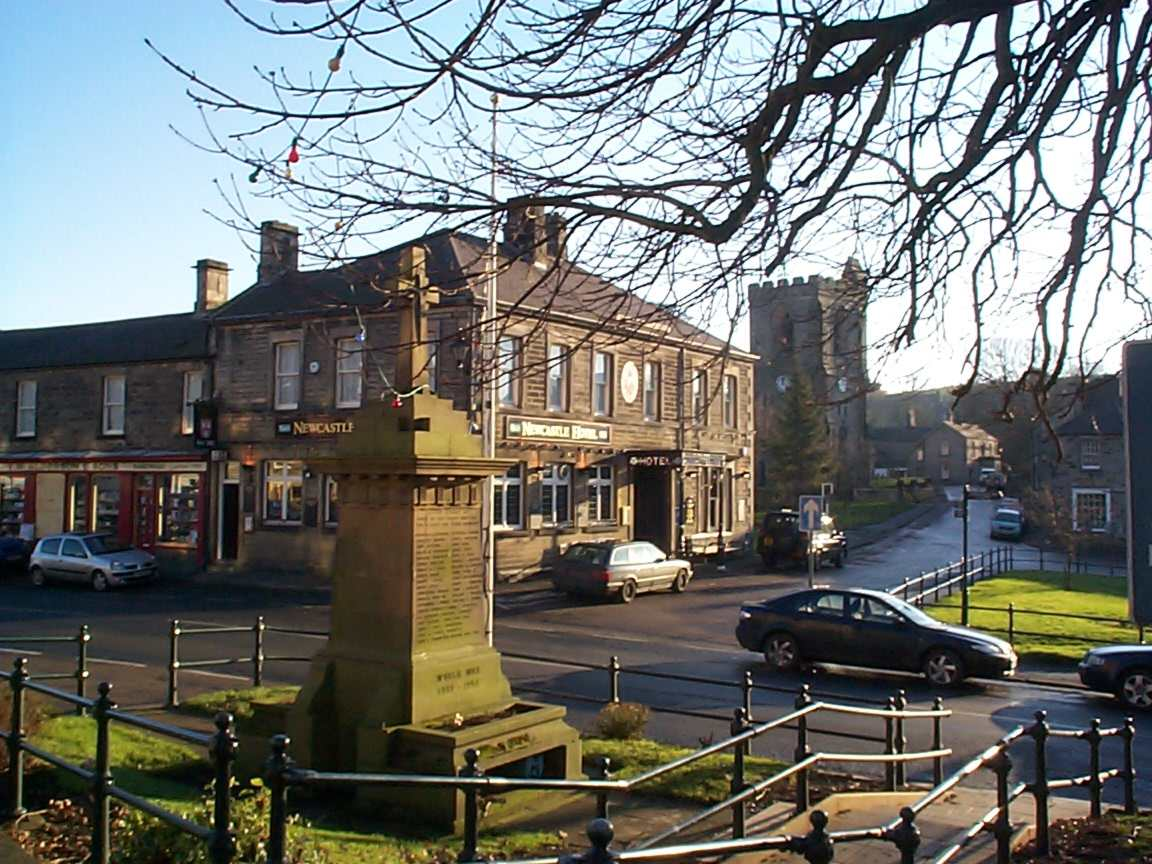
- Rothbury town centre

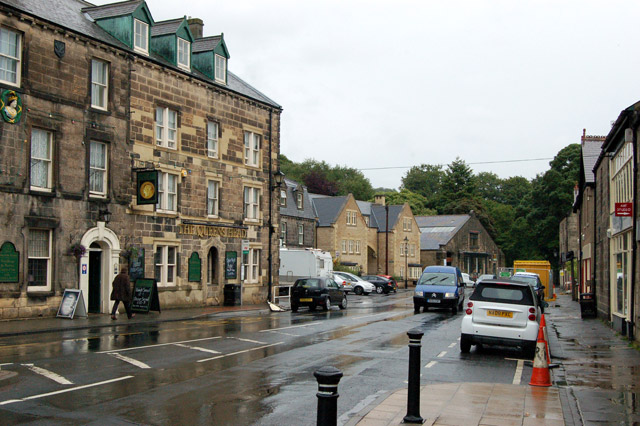
- Looking east along Town Foot

- Location within Northumberland
- Population: 2,107 (2011)
- OS grid reference: NU056017
- Civil parish: Rothbury
- Unitary authority: Northumberland
- Ceremonial county: Northumberland
- Region: North East
- Country: England
- Sovereign state: United Kingdom
- Post town: Morpeth
- Postcode district: NE65
- Dialling code: 01669
- Police: Northumbria
- Fire: Northumberland
- Ambulance: North East
- UK Parliament: North Northumberland

Rothbury is a market town and civil parish in Northumberland, England, on the River Coquet. It is 14 miles (22.5 km) north-west of Morpeth and 26 miles (42 km) north of Newcastle upon Tyne. At the 2011 census, it had a population of 2,107.

Rothbury emerged as an important town because of its location at a crossroads over a ford on the River Coquet. Turnpike roads leading to Newcastle, Alnwick, Hexham and Morpeth allowed for an influx of families and the enlargement of the settlement during the Middle Ages. In 1291, Rothbury was chartered as a market town and became a centre for dealing in cattle and wool for the surrounding villages during the Early Modern Era. Later, Rothbury developed extensively in the Victorian era, due in large part to the railway and the industrialist Sir William Armstrong. Between 1862 and 1865, Armstrong built Cragside, a country house and "shooting box" (hunting lodge) just outside Rothbury, and extended it as a "fairy palace" between 1869 and 1900. The house and its estate are now owned by the National Trust and are open to the public, attracting many visitors to the area.

== History ==
=== Prehistory and Ancient (pre-500) ===
The area around Rothbury was populated during the prehistoric period, as evidenced by finds dating from the Mesolithic period and later, although all the known finds are from beyond the outer edges of the modern town. Sites include a cairnfield, standing stone and cup-marked rock on Debdon Moor to the north of the town, a well-preserved circular cairn some 26 feet (7.9 m) in diameter, a late Neolithic or Bronze Age standing stone, and an extensive hillfort, covering an area 165 by 125 metres (541 by 410 ft) and associated cairnfield to the west of the town. No evidence of the Roman period has been found, probably because the town was a considerable distance north beyond Hadrian's Wall.

=== Saxons (500–1066) ===
Fragments from an Anglo-Saxon cross, possibly dating from the 9th century, are the only surviving relics pre-dating the Norman conquest. They were discovered in 1849, when part of the church was demolished, and in 1856. They are now in the town church and the University of Newcastle Museum.

=== Medieval (1066–1465) ===
The first documentary mention of Rothbury, according to a local history, was in around the year 1100, as Routhebiria, or "Routha's town" ("Hrotha", according to Beckensall). The village was retained as a Crown possession after the conquest, but in 1201 King John signed the Rothbury Town Charter and visited Rothbury four years later, when the rights and privileges of the manor of Rothbury were given to Robert Fitz Roger, the baron of Warkworth. Edward I visited the town in 1291, when Fitz Roger obtained a charter to authorise the holding of a market every Thursday, and a three-day annual fair near St Matthew's Day, celebrated on 21 September.

Rothbury was not particularly significant at the time, with records from 1310 showing that it consisted of a house, a garden, a bakehouse and a watermill, all of which were leased to tenants. When the line of Fitz Roger died out, the town reverted to being a crown possession, but in 1334 Edward III gave it to Henry de Percy, who had been given the castle and baronry of Warkworth six years earlier. Despite the Scottish border wars, Rothbury rose in prosperity during the 14th century, and had become the town with the highest parochial value in Northumberland by 1535. Feuds still dominated local affairs, resulting in some parishioners failing to attend church because of them in the 16th century, and at other times, gathering in armed groups in separate parts of the building.

Rothbury became a relatively important town in Coquetdale, being a crossroads situated on a ford of the River Coquet, with turnpike roads leading to Newcastle upon Tyne, Alnwick, Hexham and Morpeth. After it was chartered as a market town in 1291, it became a centre for dealing in cattle and wool for the surrounding villages. A market cross was erected in 1722, but demolished in 1827. In the 1760s, according to Bishop Pococke, Rothbury also had a small craft industry, including hatters. At that time, the parish church's vicarage and living was in the gift of the Bishop of Carlisle, and worth £500 per year.

=== Tudors and Stuarts (1465–1714) ===
==== Bernard Gilpin and the Border Reivers ====
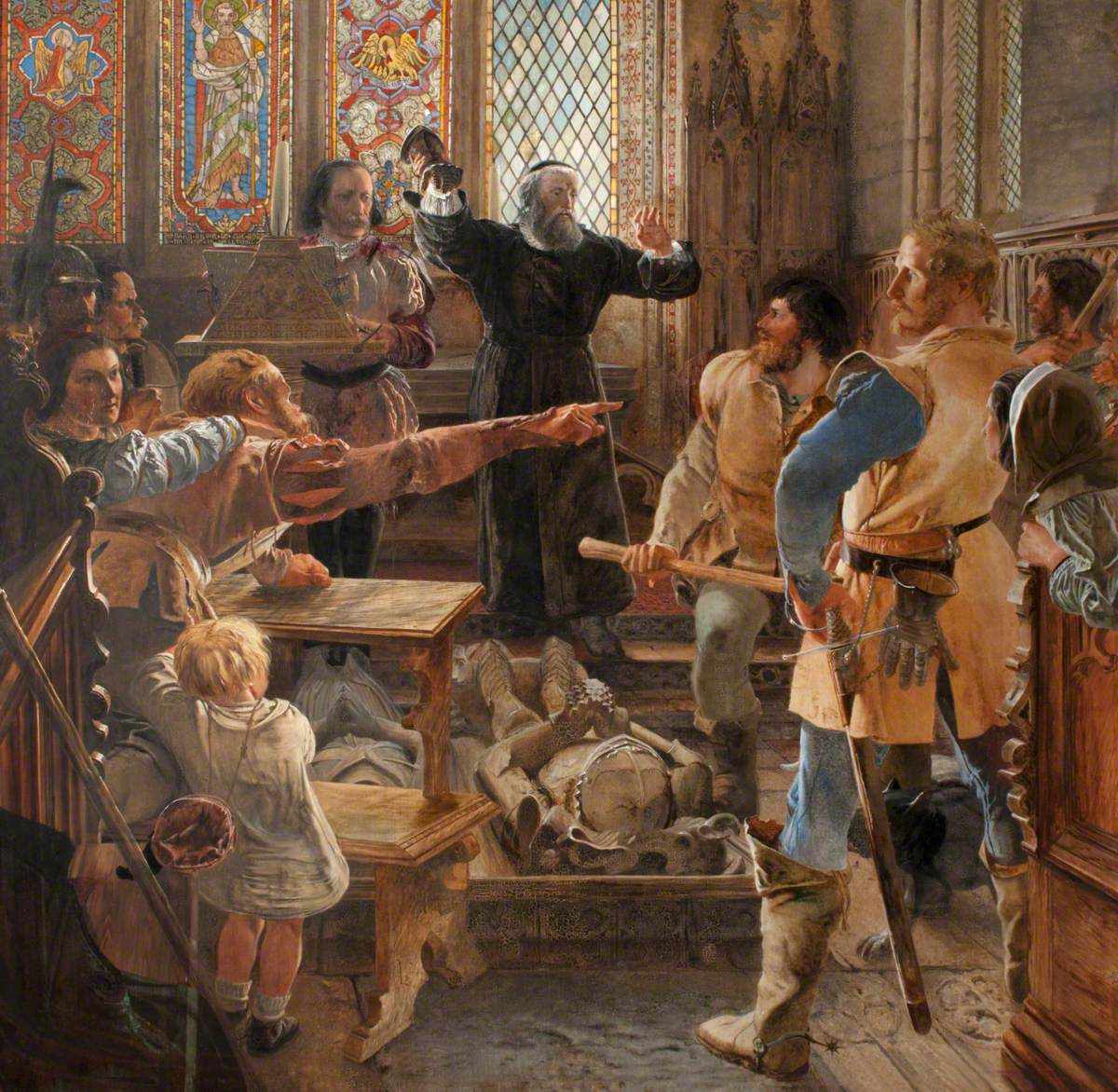
Bernard Gilpin making Peace among the Borders by taking down the Glove in Rothbury Church, painting by artist William Bell Scott (1811–1890) and housed at Wallington Hall, one of a series of eight oil paintings illustrating the history of the English Border

Rothbury has had a turbulent and bloody history. In the 15th and 16th centuries the Coquet valley was a pillaging ground for bands of Reivers who attacked and burned the town with terrifying frequency. Hill farming has been a mainstay of the local economy for many generations. Names such as Armstrong, Charleton and Robson remain well represented in the farming community. Their forebears, members of the reiver 'clans', were in constant conflict with their Scots counterpart. The many fortified farms, known as bastle houses, are reminders of troubled times which lasted until the unification of the kingdoms of England and Scotland in 1603.

The theologian Bernard Gilpin, known as the 'Apostle of the North' for his work in northern England during this period, visited Rothbury. While he preached a sermon, two rival gangs were threatening each other; realising they might start fighting, Gilpin stood between them asking them to reconcile – they agreed as long as Gilpin stayed in their presence. On another occasion, Gilpin observed a glove hanging in the church and asked the sexton about it. He was told it was a challenge to anyone who removed it. Gilpin thus took the glove and put it in his pocket and carried on with his sermon, and no-one challenged him. A painting of this incident by artist William Bell Scott is housed at Wallington Hall.

=== Georgians (1714–1837) ===
Near the town's All Saints' Parish Church stands the doorway and site of the 17th-century Three Half Moons Inn, where the Jacobite rebel James Radclyffe, 3rd Earl of Derwentwater stayed with his followers in 1715 prior to marching into a heavy defeat at the Battle of Preston in 1715.

On 16 June 1782, Methodist theologian John Wesley preached in Rothbury.

=== Victorians (1837–1901) ===
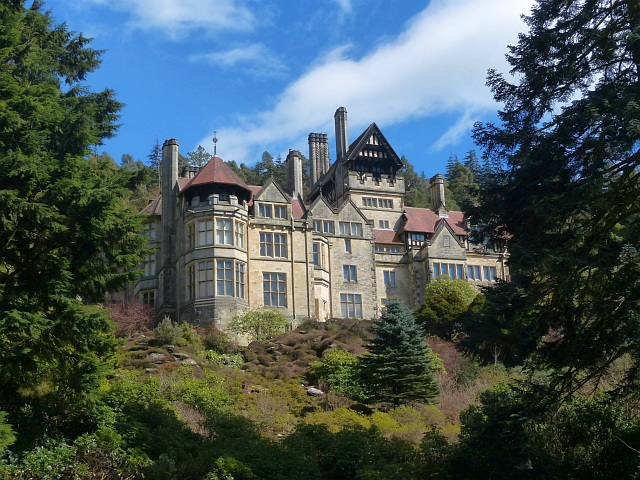
Cragside described by the Victorian periodical The World as "Truly the palace of a modern magician

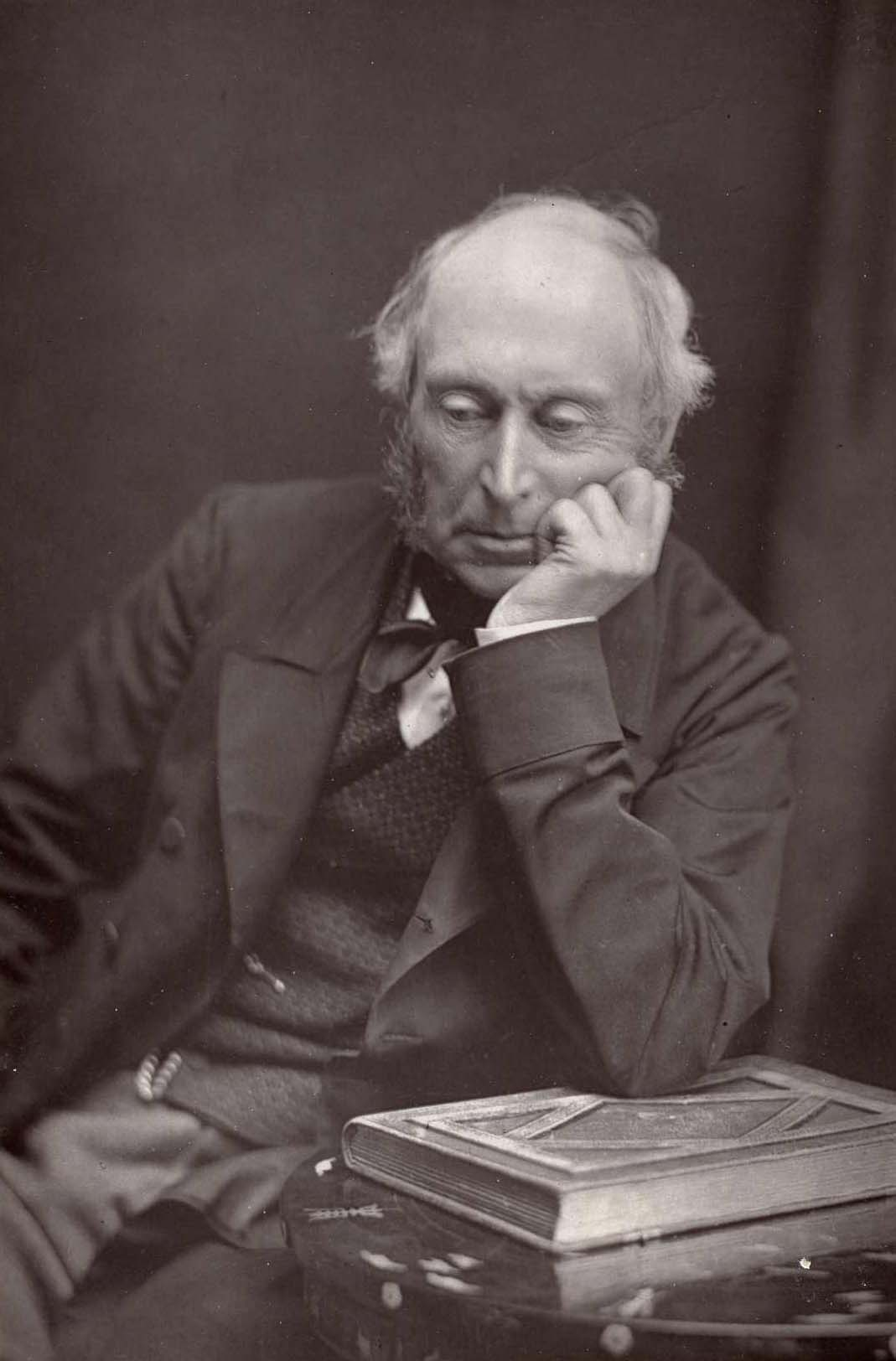
William Armstrong, 1st Baron Armstrong

==== Cragside ====
Although Rothbury is of ancient origin, it mainly developed during the Victorian era. A factor in this development was industrialist Sir William Armstrong, later Lord Armstrong of Cragside, who built the country house, and "shooting box" (hunting lodge), of Cragside, between 1862 and 1865, then extended it as a "fairy palace" between 1869 and 1900. The house and its estate are now in the possession of the National Trust and are open to the public.

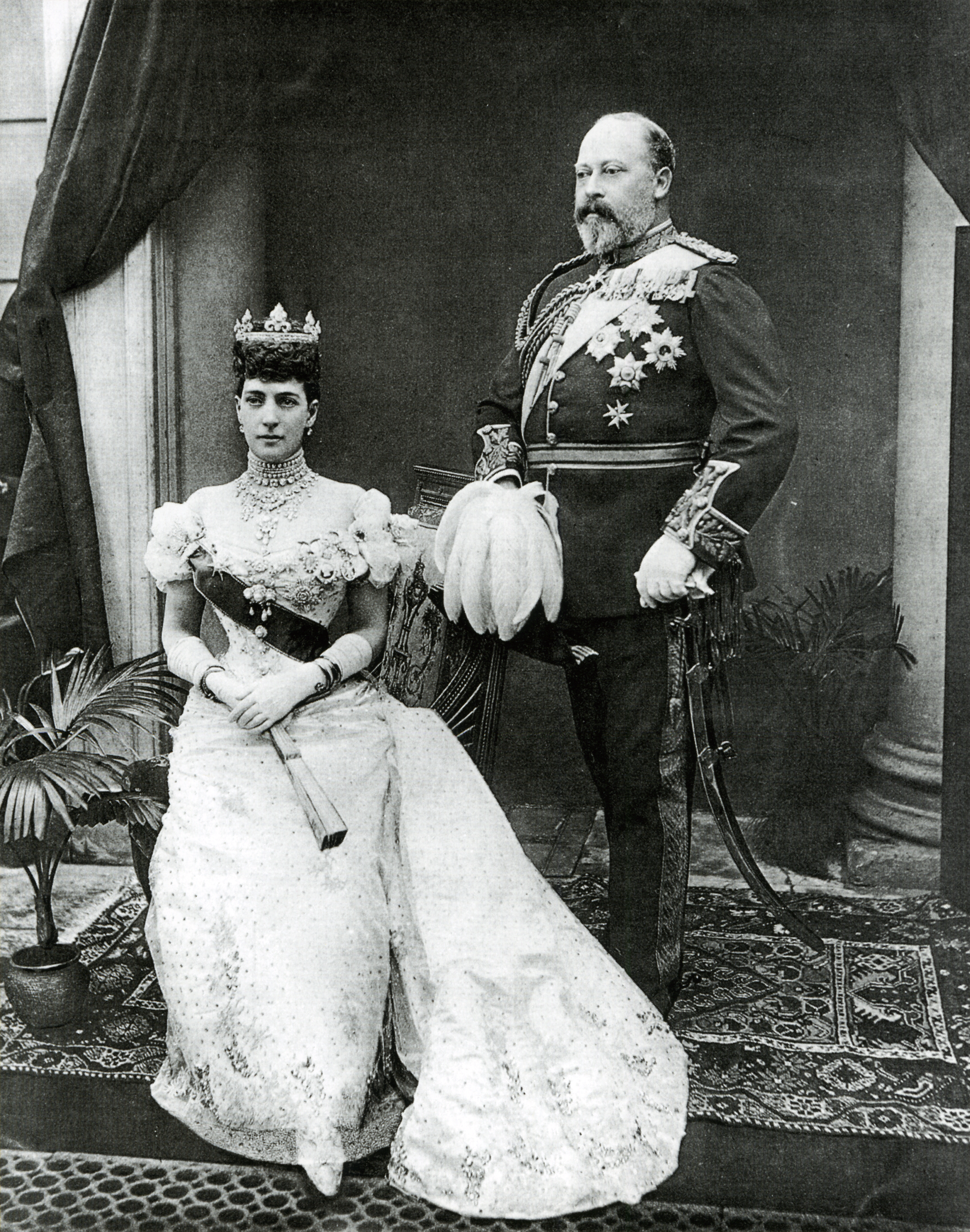
In 1884 the then Prince of Wales, Edward VII and his wife Alexandra, visited Rothbury to see Cragside and Lord Armstrong

==== 1884 royal visit ====
Another factor in Rothbury's Victorian development was the arrival of the railway. Rothbury Station opened in 1870, bringing tourists on walking holidays to the surrounding hill country. This railway was most notably used by the Prince of Wales (later Edward VII) and Princess Alexandra and their children (Albert Victor, 10, George later George V, 9, Louise, 7, Victoria, 6, Maud, 4), They arrived in Rothbury on 19 August 1884 and left on 22 August to visit Cragside and Lord Armstrong. Firework displays were held by Pain's of London.

==== David Dippie Dixon ====
David Dippie Dixon was a historian from Rothbury. He previously worked in his father's draper's shop, William Dixon and Sons, set up in Coquetdale House. After William Dixon died, David Dippie Dixon and his brother John Turnbull Dixon renamed the shop Dixon Bros.

=== 21st century ===
==== 2006 royal visit ====
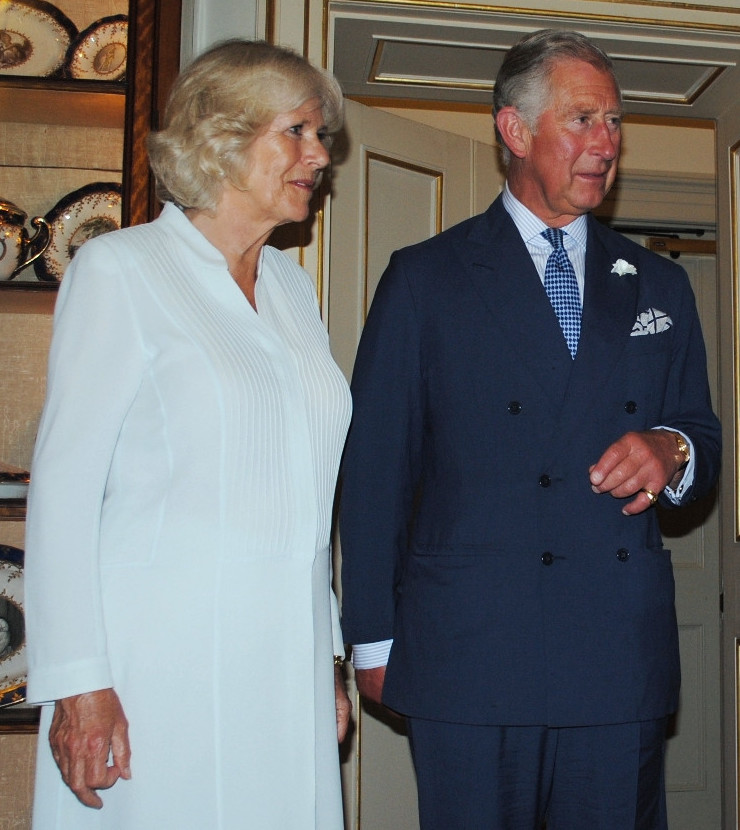
The then Prince of Wales and now current King of the United Kingdom, Prince Charles, visited Rothbury on 9 November 2006, with his wife Camilla.

On 9 November 2006, Rothbury was visited by another Prince of Wales and future King, Edward VIII's 2nd Great Grandson, Prince Charles, who is now the King of the United Kingdom. Charles visited his wife Camilla, the Duchess of Cornwall, now Queen Consort. Charles visited to reopen the refurbished Rothbury village hall, Jubilee Hall, originally built in 1897 and named after the Diamond Jubilee of Queen Victoria, his 3rd Great Grandmother. The royal couple also visited Rothbury Family Butchers, whose owner, Morris Adamson, said:

"I talked to them for about 20 minutes about the business. It was almost surreal, staggering...Two days later they sent me a thank you letter from Clarence House saying how much they had enjoyed the visit and the meat... Prince Charles congratulated us on keeping alive the traditions of the trade...He urged us to keep up the good work. It was amazing, really."

== Governance ==
=== Politics ===
==== Parish council ====
The Parish Council meets on the second Wednesday of each month (apart from August) with meetings commencing at 7 pm in the Dovecote Room, Jubilee Institute.

==== County Council ====
Rothbury is served by the Northumberland County Council and represented by Councillor Steven Bridgett, first elected in 2008 as a Liberal Democrat and re-elected in 2013, 2017, 2021 and 2025 as an Independent.

==== Parliament ====
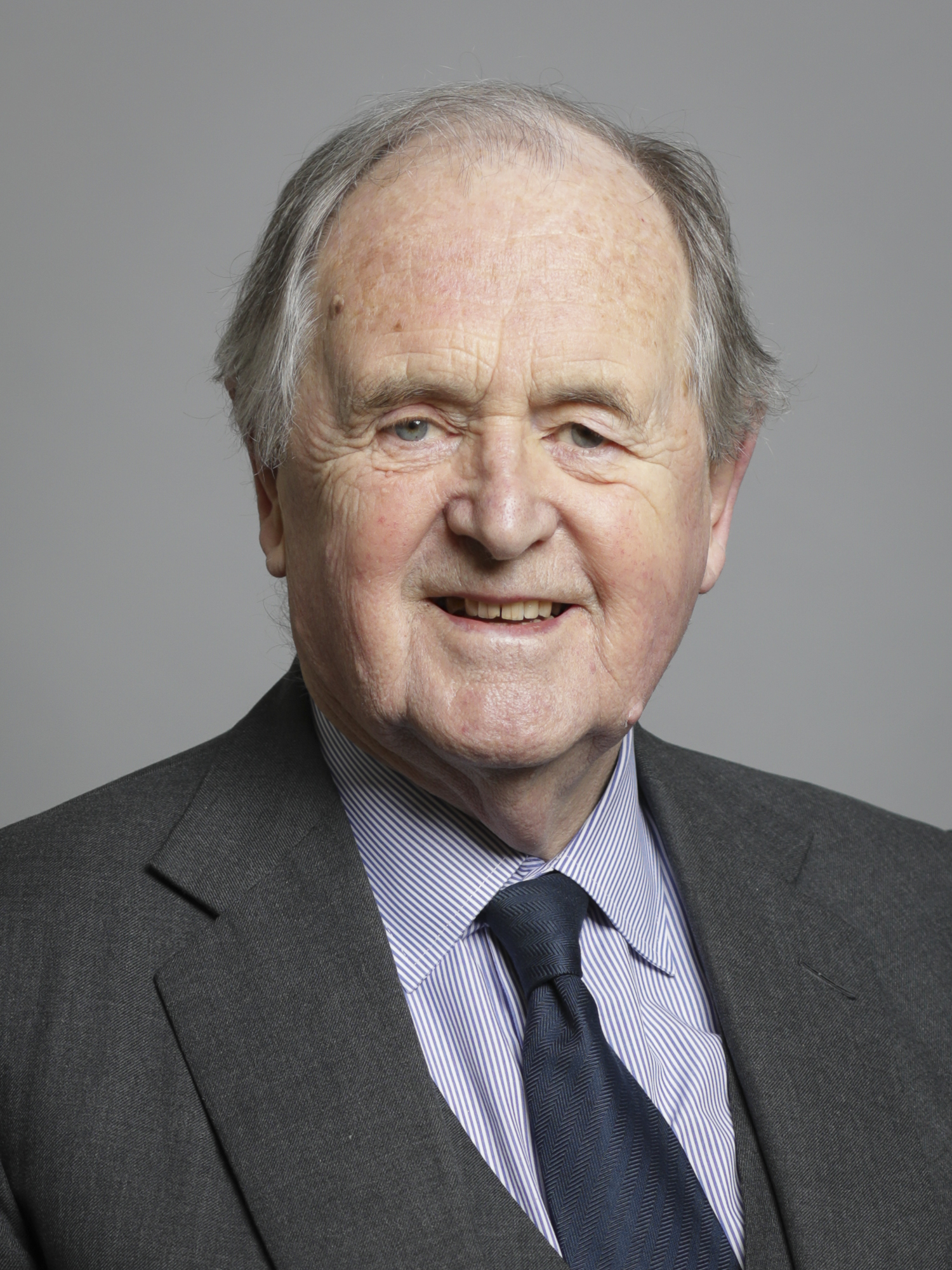
Alan Beith (Liberal Democrats 1988–present, Liberal Party before 1988) Rothbury's MP from 1973 to 2015

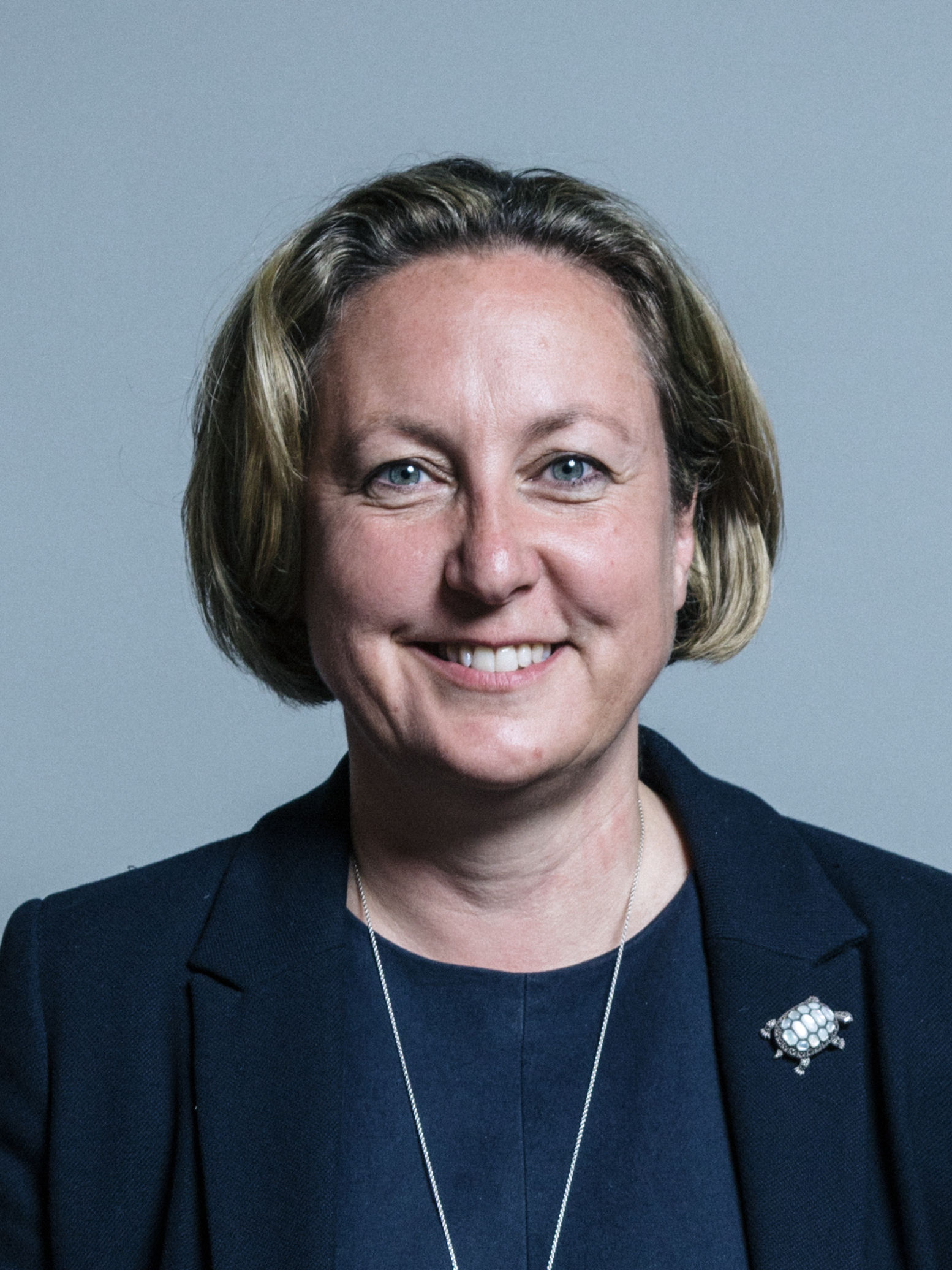
Anne-Marie Trevelyan (Conservative) Rothbury's MP from 2015 to 2024

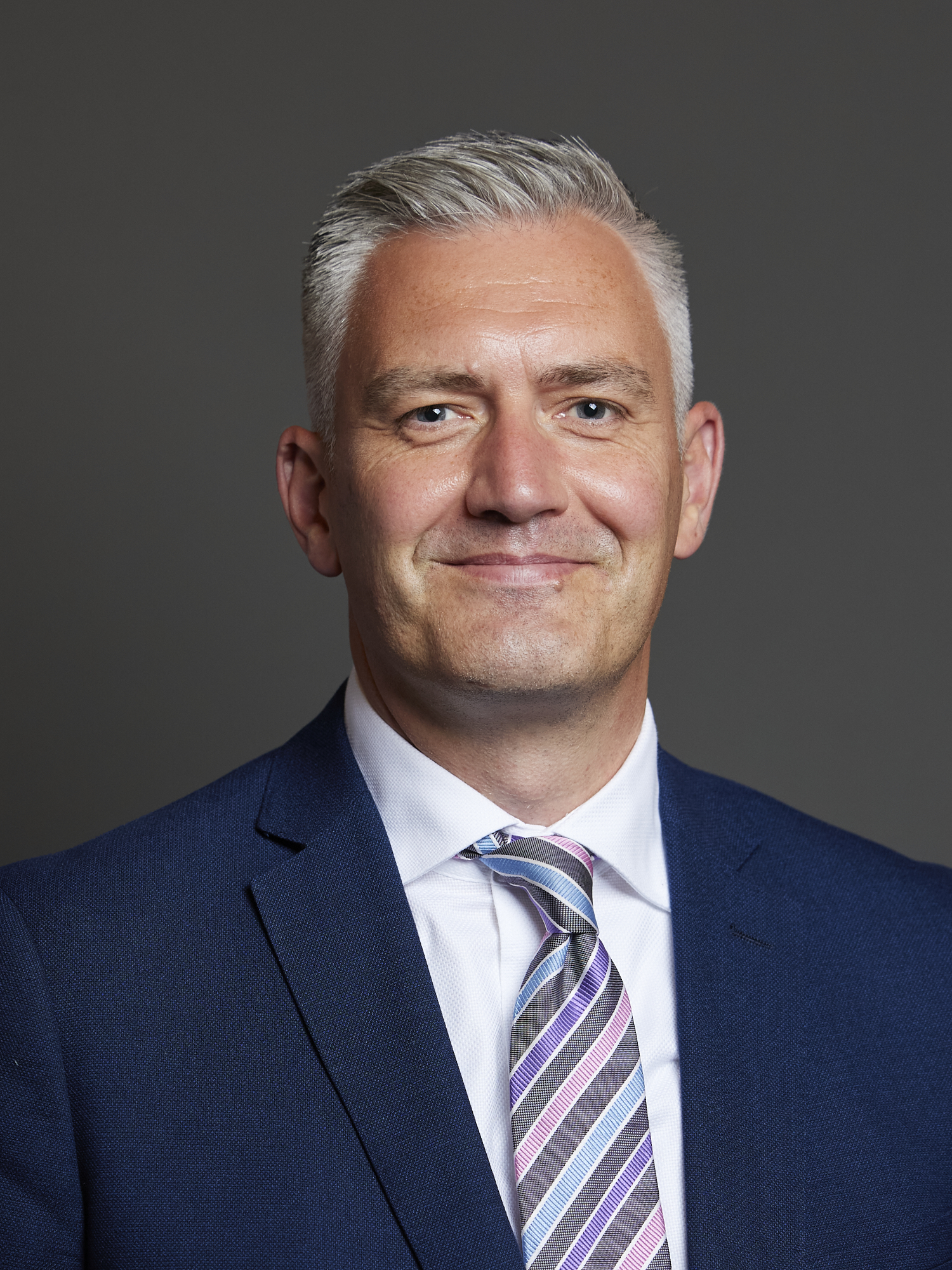
David Smith (Labour) Rothbury's MP from 2024 to present

Rothbury is in the parliamentary constituency of North Northumberland (UK Parliament constituency). The current representative is David Smith of the Labour Party who has been the local MP since 2024.

From 1973 until 2015, Rothbury's MP was Alan Beith, a member of the Liberal Democrats since 1988 and the Liberal Party prior to its merger with the Social Democratic Party; he is currently a member of the House of Lords. The constituency was represented by Anne-Marie Trevelyan of the Conservative Party (UK) from 2015 to 2024.

==== European Union ====
Prior to Britain's withdrawal from the European Union, Rothbury was in the European Parliament constituency of North East England, represented predominantly by the Labour party.

== Public services ==
=== Police ===
Rothbury is served by Northumbria Police and has a single police station, housed, since May 2019, in a building owned by the Northumberland National Park.

=== Fire ===
Rothbury has a fire station. The fire station is staffed by on-call firefighters: they do not work at the fire station full-time but are paid to spend time on call to respond to emergencies. The station has a four by four fire engine. The building and its facilities are shared with Sure Start.

=== Healthcare ===
Rothbury is served by a doctor's surgery and a hospital, Rothbury Community Hospital. The original facility was built as a private home known as Coquet House in 1872. It was converted into the Coquetdale Cottage Hospital in 1905. A maternity ward was added, as a lasting memorial to soldiers who died in the Second World War in 1946. It joined the National Health Service in 1948 and the adjoining Hawthorn Cottage was acquired in 1956. After Hawthorn Cottage had been converted into a physiotherapy department, it was officially re-opened by Jimmy Savile in 1990. After the old hospital became dilapidated, modern facilities were built in Whitton Bank Road and opened in 2007, by local GP, Dr. Angus Armstrong, and his son, TV presenter, Alexander Armstrong. The new hospital closed to inpatients in September 2016 and in June 2019 the trust advised that a group was working on proposals for the future of remaining services at the hospital. The closure caused controversy and a local protest was established called Save Rothbury Cottage Hospital. Rothbury's (Conservative) MP, Anne-Marie Trevelyan condemned the closure to inpatients in Parliament on 9 March 2017.

== Geography ==
Rothbury is located in Northumberland, England, on the River Coquet, it is 13.5 miles (21.7 km) northwest of Morpeth and 26 miles (42 km) of Newcastle upon Tyne. It is located on the edge of the Northumberland National Park. Rothbury has two Zone 6 B roads going through it: West to East is the B6341, Rothbury's main street, Front Street, is part of this B road; The second B road is the B6342, its starting point is in Rothbury, and is connected to the B6341, it is part of Rothbury's Bridge Street before going over the River Coquet on the Rothbury Bridge and going South for 23.4 miles (37.7 km) connecting to the A68 (Dere Street) at the hamlet of Colwell. Rothbury also has the B6344 on the eastern edge, it is connected to the B6341 and goes southeast for 5.6 miles (9.0 km) passing through the hamlet of Pauperhaugh and connecting to the A697 at the hamlet of Weldon Bridge.

== Demographics ==
=== Ethnicity ===
Ethnic Group	2011	
Ethnic Group	Number	%
White: Total	2086	99.0
White: English/ Welsh/ Scottish/ Northern Irish/British	2068	98.1
White: Irish	4	0.2
White: Gypsy or Irish Traveller	1	0.0
White: Other white	13	0.6
Asian or Asian British: Total	9	0.4
Asian or Asian British: Chinese	7	0.3
Asian or Asian British: Indian	1	0.0
Asian or Asian British: Asian Other	1	0.0
Black or Black British	3	0.1
Other	1	0.0
Total	2107	100.0

Note: An ethnic group that is not on the table means that no one from that ethnic group was recorded being present in Rothbury at the time of the census.

=== Religion ===
Religion	2011	
Religion	Number	%
All usual residents	2,107	100.0
Has religion	1,480	70.2
Christian	1,466	69.6
Buddhist	2	0.1
Muslim	2	0.1
Other religion	10	0.5
No religion	477	22.6
Religion not stated	150	7.1

Note: A religion that is not on the table means that no practitioner of that religion was recorded being present in Rothbury at the time of the census.

== Landmarks ==
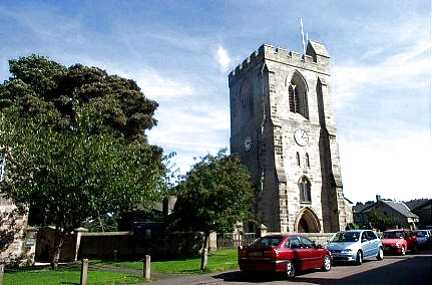
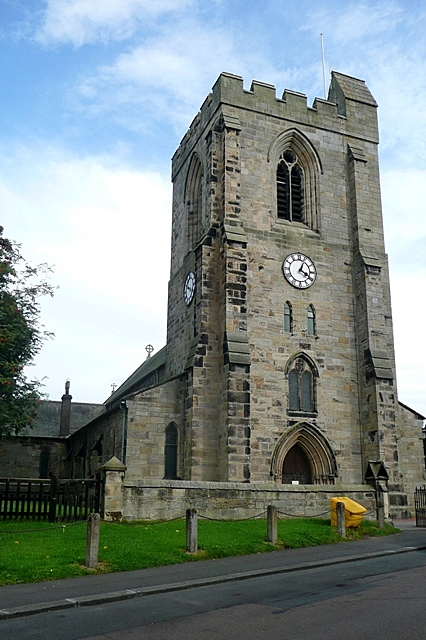
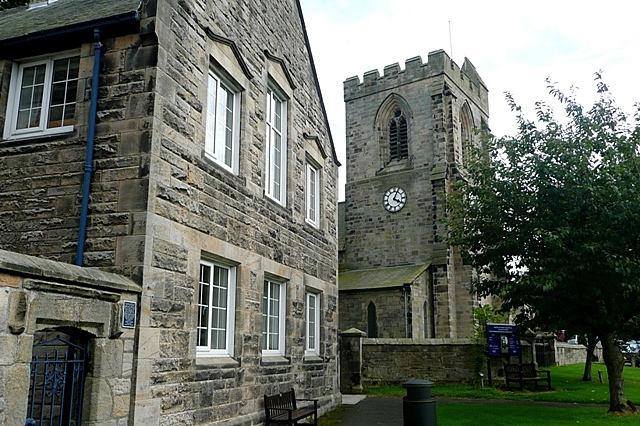
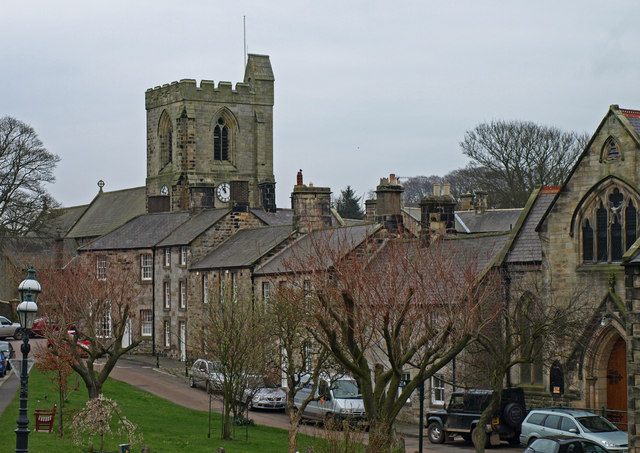
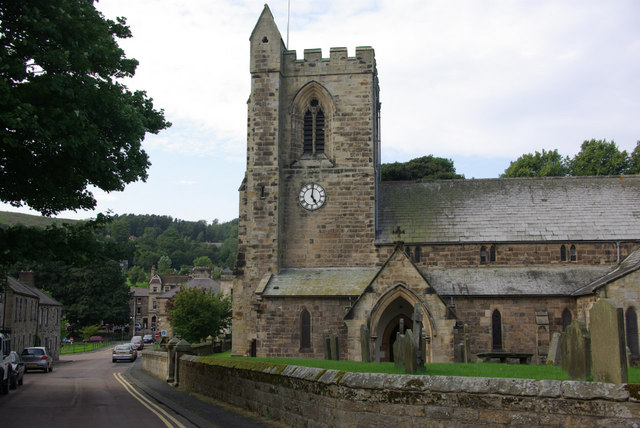
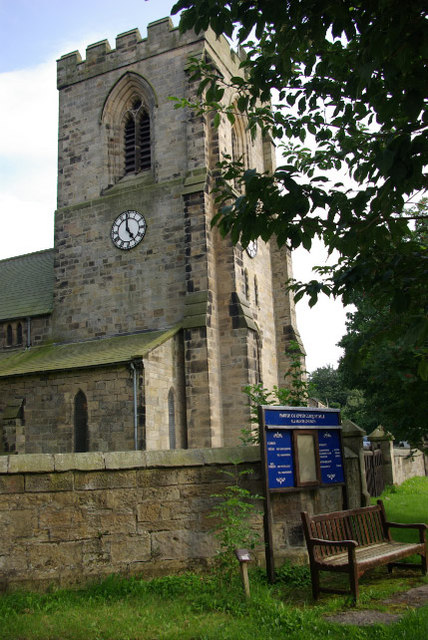
All Saints' Church incorporates materials from an ancient Anglo-Saxon place of worship

Rothbury's Anglican parish church building – All Saints' Church – dates from circa 1850, largely replacing but in parts incorporating the fabric of a former Saxon edifice, including the chancel, the east wall of the south transept and the chancel arch. The church has a font with a stem or pedestal using a section of the Anglo-Saxon cross shaft, showing what is reputed to be the earliest carved representation in Great Britain of the Ascension of Christ.

The Anglo-Saxon cross is not to be confused with the market cross near the church, the current version of which was erected in 1902 and is known as "St Armstrong's Cross" as it was paid for by Lady Armstrong, widow of Lord Armstrong of Cragside. Until 1965, Rothbury was the location of a racecourse, which had operated intermittently since April 1759, but seldom staged more than one meeting per year. The course was affected by flooding in the 1960s, and the last meeting was on 10 April 1965. The site is now used by Rothbury Golf Club.

Half a mile to the south, Whitton Tower is an exceptionally well-preserved 14th-century pele tower.

Lordenshaw Hill has an important concentration of rock carvings, amounting to over 100 panels in an area of less than 620 acres (250 ha). Carved panels include cup-marked boulders and complex panels. Other archaeological sites in this area include an Iron Age enclosure and an Early Bronze Age cairn.

== Transport ==
=== Former railway station ===
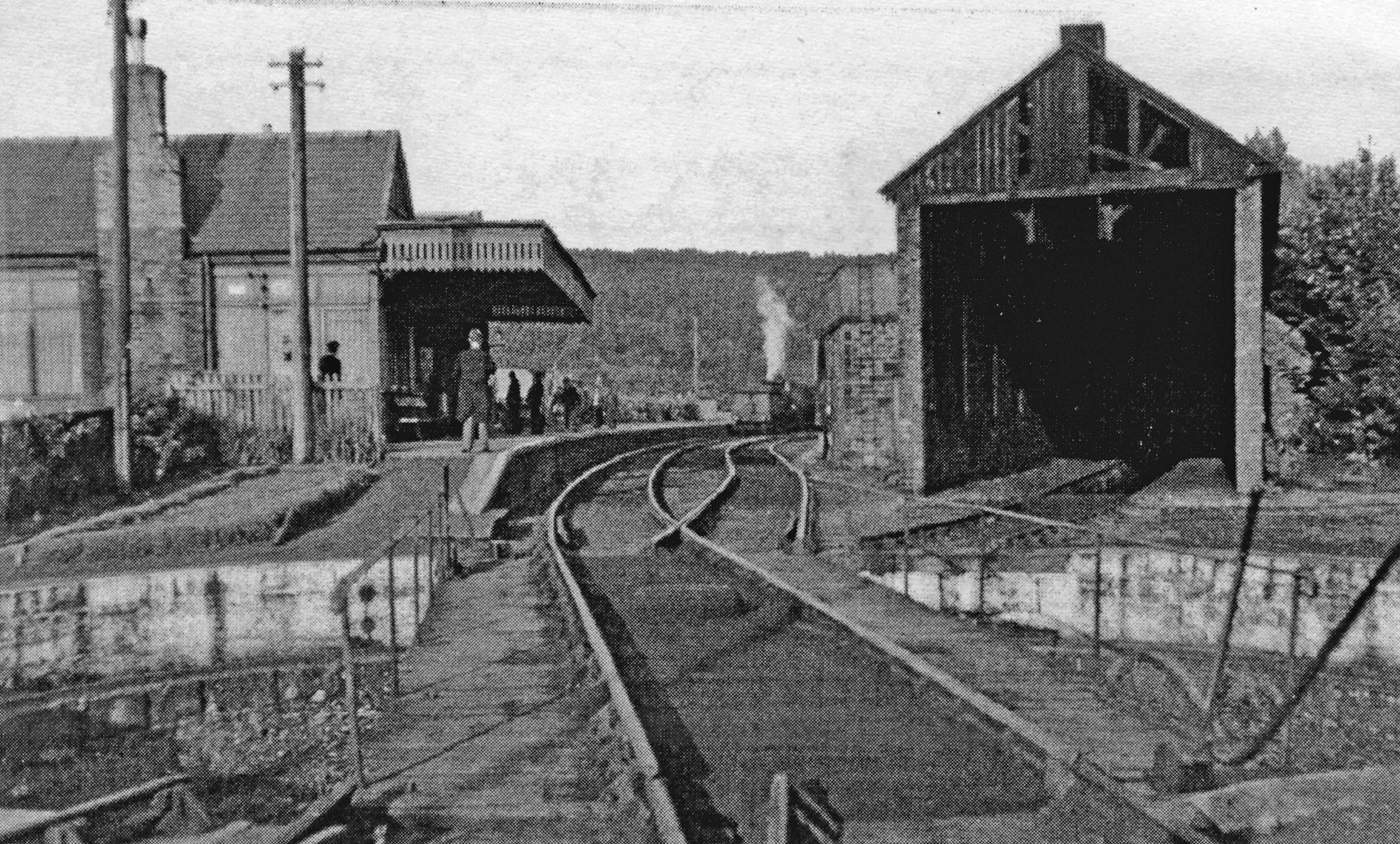
Rothbury station (1953)

The town was the terminus of the Rothbury Branch from Scotsgap railway station on the North British Railway line from Morpeth to Reedsmouth. The line opened on 1 November 1870, the last passenger trains ran on 15 September 1952 and the line closed completely on 9 November 1963. Rothbury station was located to the south of the River Coquet, and the site has been reused as an industrial estate, where the only obvious remains are one wall of the engine shed, which has become part of an engineering workshop. The old Station Hotel still stands near the site, but is now known as The Coquetvale Hotel. It was built in the 1870s by William Armstrong, as a suitable place for visitors to his house at Cragside to be accommodated.

=== Bus services ===
The town is now served by an Arriva North East bus service X14 which runs via Longframlington, Longhorsley, Morpeth and continues to Newcastle upon Tyne, the nearest city. This runs every two hours during the day, hourly at peak morning and evening periods.

== Education ==
Rothbury has two schools:

- Rothbury First School – a community school for 3- to 9-year-olds of both sexes. (This type of school is state funded, with the local education authority employing the staff, being responsible for the school's admissions and owning the school's estate.) It can accommodate 126 pupils and currently has 94.
- Dr Thomlinson Church of England Middle School – founded in 1720, and for 9- to 13-year-olds of both sexes, is run by the academy trust The Three Rivers Learning Trust. The school can accommodate 258 pupils and currently has 232. In February 2019 pupils took part in the School's Climate Strike, which saw pupils not attending school and protesting over climate change.

Rothbury is in the catchment area for The King Edward VI School, Morpeth, also run by The Three Rivers Learning Trust.

== Culture and community ==
=== Music ===
==== Rothbury Traditional Music Festival ====
External videos
- Alexander Armstong announcing the 2021 Rothbury Traditional Music Festival from a erupting Icelandic volcano
- Martin Carthy performing at the Rothbury Traditional Music Festival (2021)

Rothbury has an annual Rothbury Traditional music festival. It consists of music concerts and competitions within the genre of folk music, mainly traditional Northumberland folk music. In 2013, the festival was featured on Northumberland-born TV Presenter and actor Robson Green's documentary series Tales from Northumberland with Robson Green (Season one, Episode five). In 2019, TV presenter and singer Alexander Armstrong, who was born in Rothbury, was made patron of the festival, in 2021 Armstrong announced the return of the Music Festival from an erupting Icelandic volcano in a video posted on the Facebook page of the Festival after it was cancelled in 2020 due to the COVID-19 pandemic. Notable music acts that have performed at the festival include:

2015:

- Dan Walsh, banjoist
- Chris Parkinson, co-founder of the British folk band The House Band

2019:

- Jez Lowe, County Durham folk singer-songwriter
- Folkestra, The Sage Gateshead’s youth folk ensemble

2021:

- Martin Carthy, influential folk singer and guitarist.

==== Rothbury Hills ====
Rothbury has a tune about it called "Rothbury Hills," written by Jack Armstrong in 1944. It has been performed by Kathryn Tickell on her 2009 album "Northumberland Collection", and Alexander Armstrong wrote and sang some lyrics to it on his 2015 album "A Year of Songs".

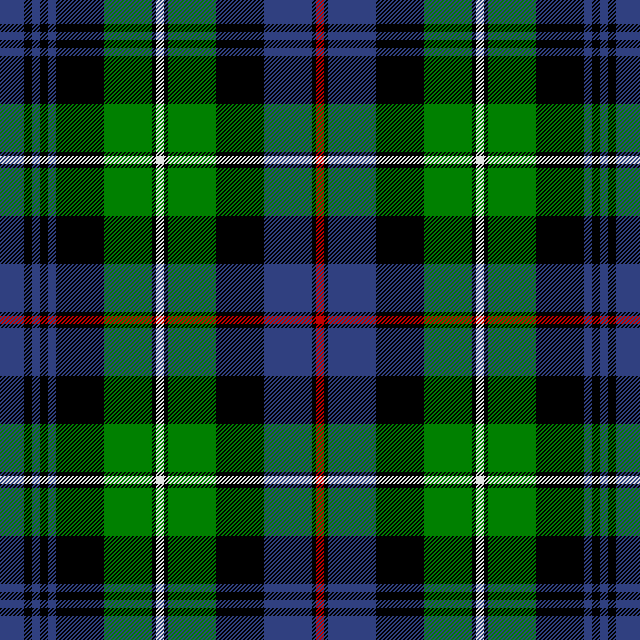
Mackenzie tartan, the pattern is used for the kilts of the Rothbury Highland Pipe Band

==== Rothbury Highland Pipe Band ====
External videos
- Rothbury Highland Pipe Band performing at the Rothbury Traditional Music Festival (2014)

Rothbury has its own pipe band, called the Rothbury Highland Pipe Band. The band was established on 1 June 1920, then being named the Rothbury Kilted Pipe Band. The tartan chosen for their kilts was taken from the army regiment the Seaforth Highlanders, as during World War One some of their soldiers were stationed in Coquetdale and developed friendships with the local people. They reformed in the 1950s and renamed the Rothbury Highland Pipe Band. The band has appeared on the TV show The White Heather Club.

=== Football ===
Rothbury has its own football club: Rothbury FC; the club is in Division One of the Northern Football Alliance, which is on level 11 of the National League System.

=== Folklore ===
In Rothbury folklore Simonside Hills overlooking Rothbury has a mythical creature called a deaugar or duergar (Norse for 'dwarf'). It is said that the creature lures people at night by its lantern light towards bogs or cliffs to kill them. The deaugar has entered into Rothbury's popular culture: in 2021 local musician and poet James Tait wrote a debut children's book called The World of Lightness: A Story of the Duergar of Simonside; an annual 10-mile winter nighttime trail run in the Simonside Hills is called the Duergar Nightcrawler; and a Rothbury art gallery is named Red Deaugar Art Gallery, run by local artist Margaret Bodley Edwards, a descendant of Gothic Revival architect George Frederick Bodley (1827–1907), and of diplomat and founder of the Bodleian Library in Oxford, Sir Thomas Bodley (1545–1613).

=== Bedlington Terrier ===
The Bedlington Terrier was originally named after Rothbury and known as the Rothbury or Rodbury Terrier but the name was changed owing to the popularity of the breed with miners in the Northumberland pit village of Bedlington.

== Crime ==
A number of notable crimes have been committed in or connected to Rothbury.

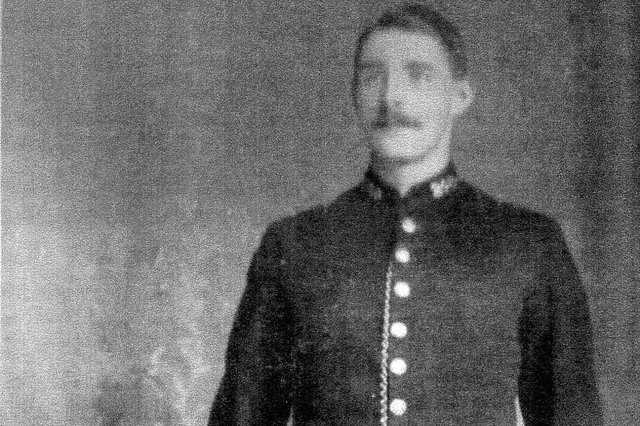
PC Francis Sinton who was attacked after successfully stopping the robbery of the Rothbury Brewery, he was awarded the King’s Police Medal for Gallantry for his efforts.

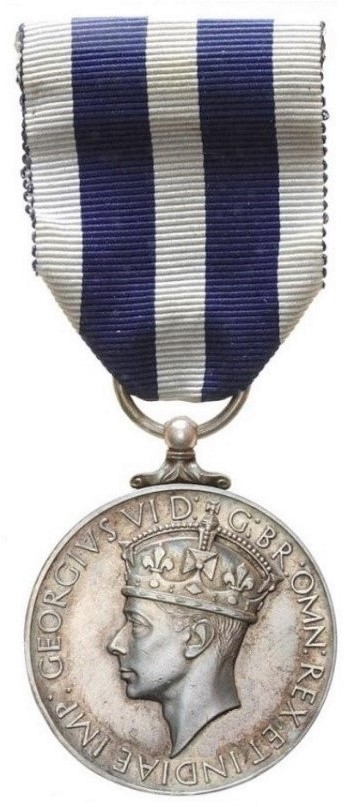
King's Police Medal, which PC Francis Sinton was awarded

=== 1919 armed robbery of Rothbury Brewery ===
Dubbed by a newspaper as a "Wild West Drama", on the night of 28 February 1919, an attempted armed robbery took place at the Rothbury Brewery. Two Russian sailors, Peter Klighe and Karl Strautin, broke into the brewery to rob it, however, at around 9:00 pm, patrol officer PC Francis Sinton was walking past the Brewery, and he approached it after hearing noises of breaking glass. As he did so he told a passer-by named James Curry to fetch the manager, Mr Farndale. As PC Sinton approached the brewery one of the two men appeared from it and shot at Sinton, missing him only slightly, and the two began to tussle as the second man appeared from the brewery and smashed Sinton's head with an iron bar. Curry and Farndale arrived finding PC Sinton laying on the ground, Farnsdale struggled with one of the assailant, however he managed to fight Farnsdale off leaving Farnsdale with the assailant's muffler scarf, with the assailant escaping with his accomplice. After an extensive police search around Northumberland, the two perpetrators were found in Walbottle Dene. Despite being armed with a pistol they gave themselves up. The pair were found wearing clothes stolen from the Ashington Co-Op, where they also broke into the safe. They were suspected of breaking into a number of safes across the region. They were charged with four counts of burglary and attempted murder, being sentenced to penal servitude for 13 years before being deported. PC Sinton was awarded the King's Police Medal for his gallantry.

=== 1993 armed robbery of the Rothbury Post Office ===
Overnight on 23 and 24 August 1993, Rothbury experienced another armed robbery. An organised crime gang robbed the Rothbury post office of £15,000 (about £30,000 in 2020 money) in cash, stamps and pension books. Armed with iron crowbars and dressed in camouflage and ski masks, the robbers cut the telephone wires, blocked the main road with a stolen council van, and threatened local residents.

The then MP for Rothbury, Liberal Democrat Alan Beith said the event showed rural communities like Rothbury needed extra police cover to fight organised crime. Detective Inspector John Hope, who led the investigation, stated that too much of focus on cities leads to organized crime moving to rural villages. He also said that improving roads to give better police access to rural villages would help decrease crime, and that the criminal justice system was failing to convict people, with criminals knowing they could escape punishment.

=== 2010 Northumbria police manhunt ===
In July 2010, Rothbury was the site of a major police manhunt. Raoul Moat was released from HM Prison Durham on 1 July, after an 18-week sentence for assaulting a nine-year-old relative. During his prison sentence, his girlfriend had a relationship with a police officer that she kept secret from Moat; his business also collapsed while he was in prison, for which he blamed the police. After his release, he discovered his girlfriend's relationship; he shot and killed her new boyfriend, 29-year-old karate instructor Chris Brown, and attempted to kill her. Then, while driving on the A1, he attacked police officer David Rathband, stationed in a patrol car on the roundabout of the A1 and A69 roads near East Denton, permanently blinding him. (Rathband hanged himself at home in Blyth 18 months later.) Moat then went on the run for six days (3–9 July), hiding in and around Rothbury. Police then cornered him by the river on the night of 9 July. After a six-hour stand-off, with Moat holding a gun to his head the entire time, Moat committed suicide by shooting himself early on the morning of 10 July.

== Notable people ==
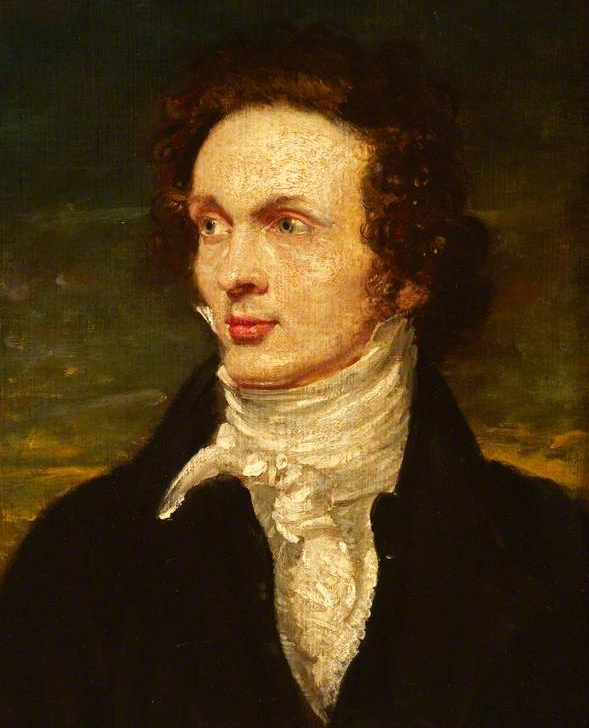
Thomas Alcock, a surgeon, and medical writer, was born in Rothbury in 1784.

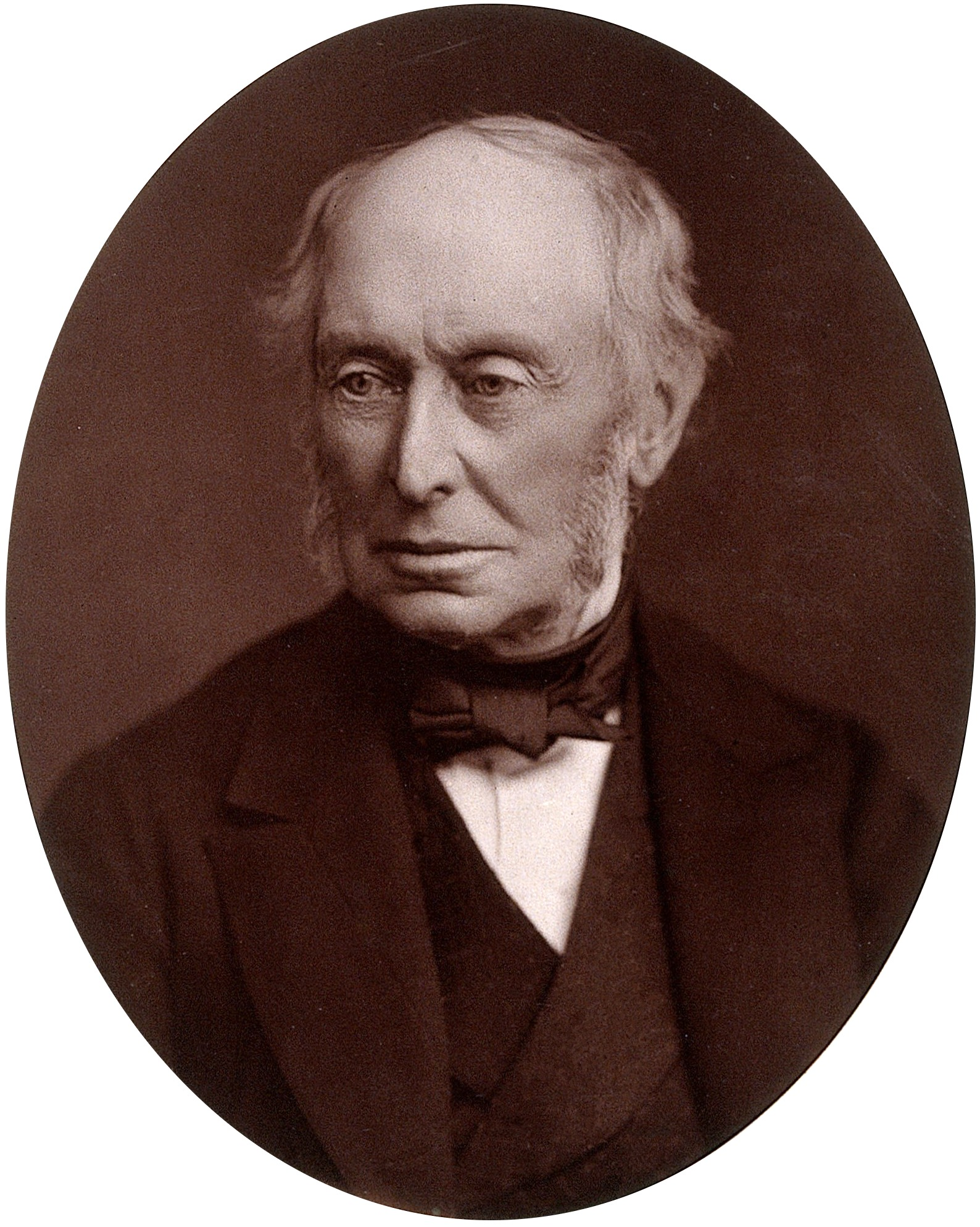
William Armstrong, a industrialist lived in at his home of Cragside in Rothbury.

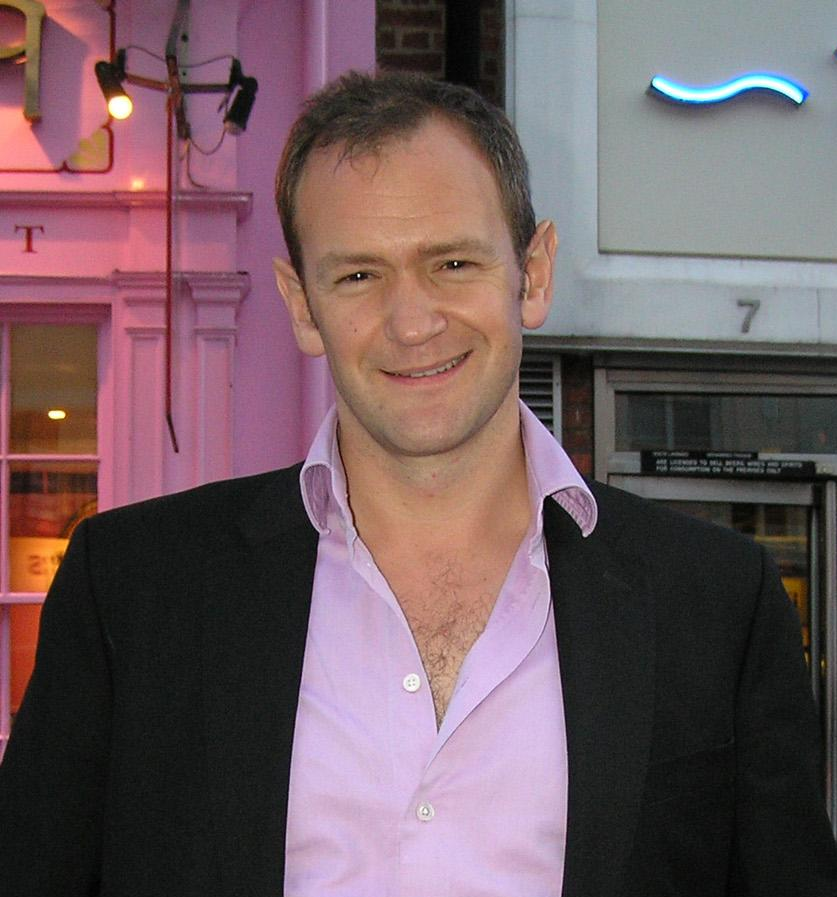
Alexander Armstrong, a TV and radio personality, and host of the quiz show Pointless, was born in Rothbury.

- Rowland Taylor (1510–1555) an English Protestant martyr during the Marian Persecutions.
- James Robson (died ca.1757) a landowner, poet, songwriter and one time Jacobite rebel.
- John Brown (1715–1766) an English Anglican priest, playwright and essayist.
- Thomas Alcock (1784–1833) an English surgeon.
- William Armstrong, 1st Baron Armstrong (1810–1900) an English engineer and industrialist
- Imogen Stubbs (born 1961), actress, was born in Rothbury.
- Alexander Armstrong (born 1970), actor, comedian, and co-presenter of Pointless, was born in Rothbury. His father was a GP in the town.

== In popular culture ==
=== Film ===
- Moonlight Sonata (1937) is a film shot at Cragside. It was directed by Lothar Mendes, written by Edward Knoblock and E. M. Delafield, and starred the former Prime Minister of Poland, Ignacy Jan Paderewski.
- The Boy and the Bus (2014), a short film (23 minutes long) directed by Simon Pitts, written by Rod Arthur, and featuring actors Ali Cook and Tracey Wilkinson, and with music by John Elliott and Tiny Ruins, was filmed in Rothbury, the film involved a number of locals as extras including pupils from Dr Thomlinson's.

=== TV ===
==== Documentary ====
- The Restoration Man (2010–present), is a home improvement show presented by architect George Clarke, the renovation of Thrum Mill by locals Dave and Margaret Hedley into a home was featured on the show in Series 3: Episode 4 (2014) and Clarke's revisiting of the mill a year later in Series 4: Episode Eight (2015).
  External videos
  - The Restoration Man: Renovation of Thrum Mill (46:58). DIY Daily – Home & Garden. (YouTube)

==== Drama ====
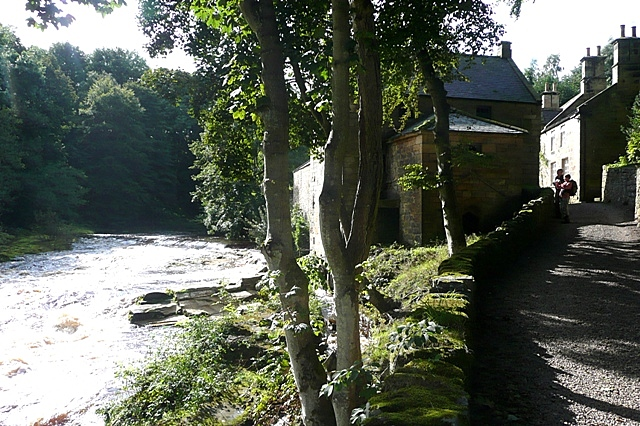
Thrum Mill where episode Silent Voices (Season 2 Episode 2) of ITV crime drama Vera was filmed

Vera (2011–present), a ITV crime drama set in North East England; Northumberland and Tyne and Wear, has scenes from two episodes filmed in Rothbury:

- Silent Voices (Season 2 Episode 2) at Thrum Mill, and
- Darkwater (Season 8 Episode 4) at Simonside Hills

Line producer Margaret Mitchell commented on filming at Rothbury for Darkwater:

"We arrived very early in the morning, on an October day when it was very misty. The sun was rising and shone through the water – that was particularly beautiful. It's a great place for walking. When you're here, you're completely struck by the expansive land, the light and the skies. You can see the vast panorama of countryside, the light just fills your eyes. It's incredible."

== Gallery ==
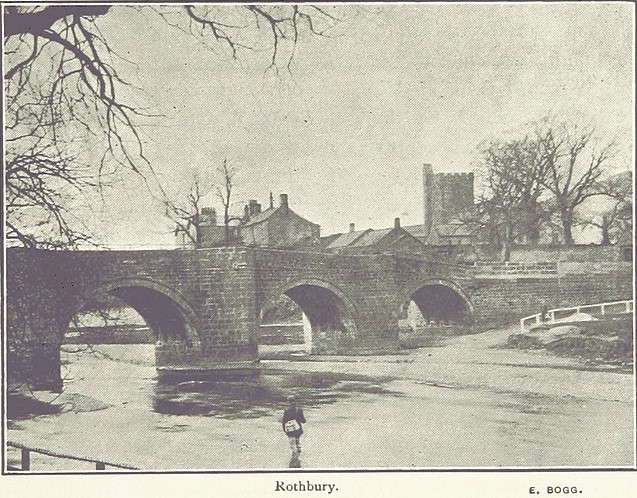
Rothbury looking over the River Coquet on the north bank to the Bridge and All Saints' Church (1898)

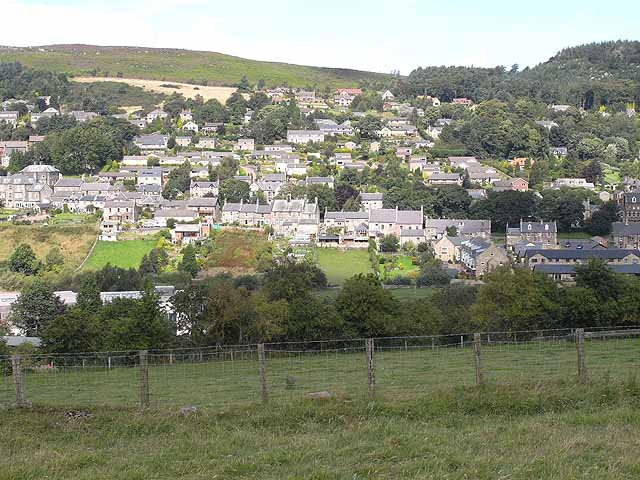
View of Rothbury from Whitton Bank, on the northside of the River Coquet, to the southside, where the majority of the town stands.

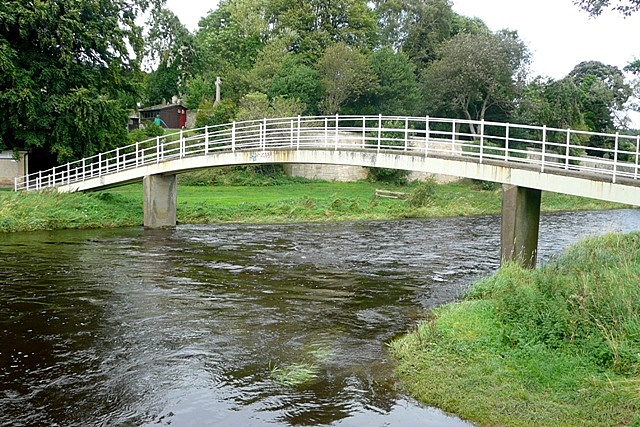
Bridge over the Coquet at Rothbury. This pedestrian bridge links the car park (right) with the town (left).

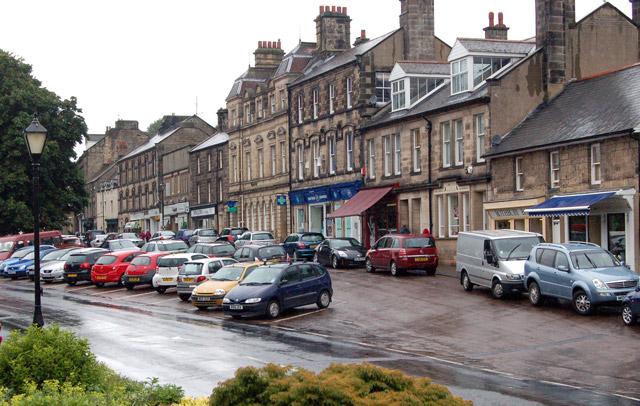
Looking west along Front Street (B6341), in the foreground, and High Street, in the background, running parallel to Front Street.

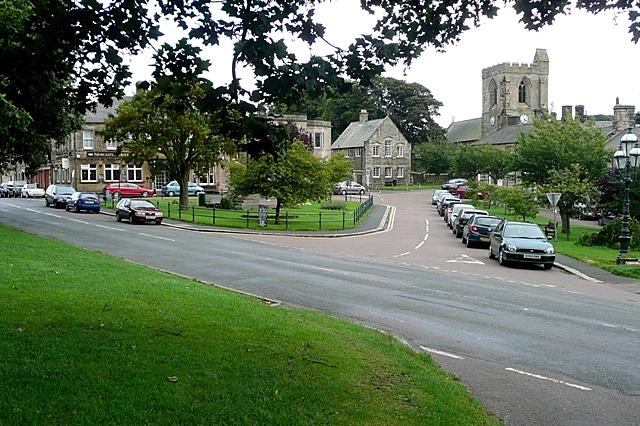
Looking to the junction of Front Street (B6341), in the foreground running left ro right, and Church Street, this street leads from Town Foot to All Saints church.

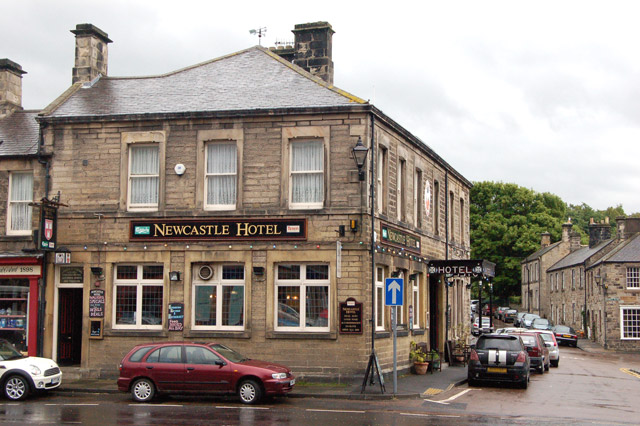
Newcastle Hotel, on the junction of Front Street (B6341), foreground, and Church Street, right.

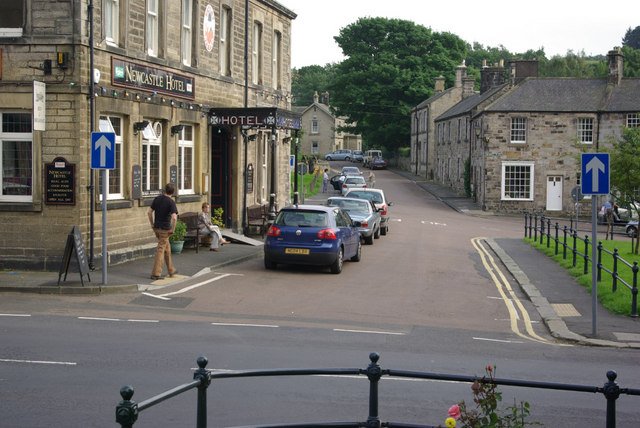
Church Street with the Newcastle Hotel to its left, connecting to Front Street (B6341), in the foreground running left to right.

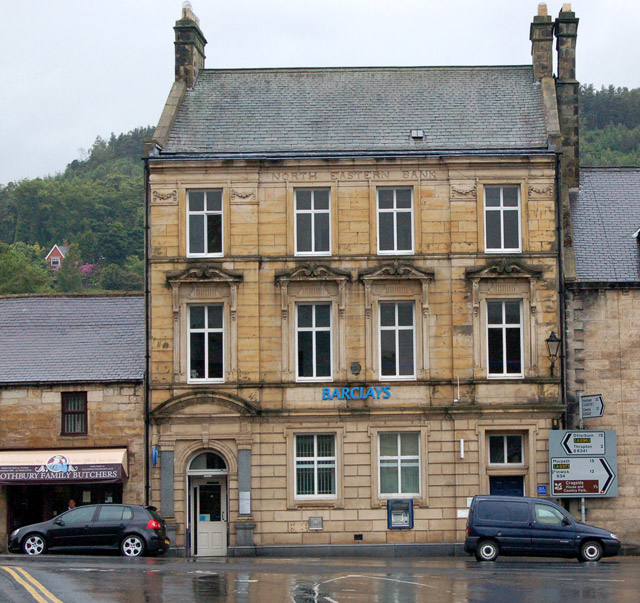
Barclays Bank, the building stands at the junction of Bridge Street and Town Foot (B6341).

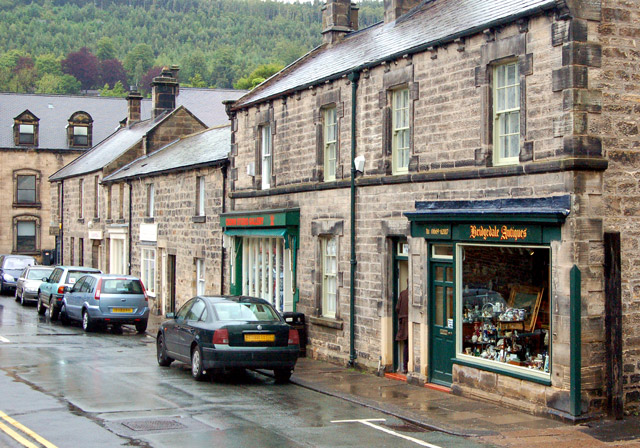
Looking northeast along Bridge Street, in the background Town Foot (B6341) can be seen connecting to it.

== References and further reading ==
=== Further reading ===
- Beckensall, Stan (2001). Northumberland The Power of Place. Tempus Publishing. ISBN 978-0-7524-1907-7.
- Finlayson, Rhona; Hardie, Caroline; et al. (2009). "Rothbury Northumberland Extensive Urban Survey" (PDF). Northumberland County Council.
- Graham, Frank (1975). Rothbury and Coquetdale. ISBN 978-0-85983-092-8.
