= Banman =

Banman is a surname. Notable people with the surname include:

- Bruce Banman (fl. 1997), Canadian politician
- Robert Banman (born 1945), Canadian politician

== See also ==
- Batman (surname)
- Barman (surname)
- Boatman (surname)
