= David Dippie Dixon =

English local historian and writer on his native Northumberland

David Dippie Dixon (1 September 1842 in Whittingham – 28 November 1929 in Rothbury) was an English local historian and writer on his native Northumberland.

== Biography ==
David Dippie Dixon was born in Whittingham, Northumberland, on 1 September 1842 to parents William and Jane Dixon, and christened there on 23 October 1842. Although his middle name is sometimes assumed to be a pejorative nickname, it was actually the maiden name of his paternal grandmother, Margaret Dippee.

He was brought up in Whittingham and was educated at the local village school, which he left at the age of 13 to become apprentice in his father's drapery and grocery shop in the village. In 1862, his father opened a second shop in Coquetdale House, on the High Street in Rothbury (about 6 miles south of Whittingham). David entered into a legal partnership with his father and moved to set up the new store under the name of "Dixon & Sons".

In Rothbury he met Mary Hindhaugh, and married in 1869. Mary was the daughter of Robert Hindhaugh, who ran the local brewery and was part of a "large and influential family ... since at least the seventeenth century". After they were married, they lived "above the store" in Coquetdale House.

But David did not just work as a grocer and draper. He was fascinated by the history of the area, and was an avid researcher of and writer on local history. Apart from numerous articles, he wrote two significant books on the area's history (see below). According to John Roland Bibby in the foreword to a facsimile version of the latter of these books, David edited the local parish magazine and contributed to The Newcastle Society of Antiquities with his writings and artefacts that he had been given. He was a Church Warden, a Sunday School teacher, co-founder of the Rothbury Company of Volunteers, a member of the local Red Cross Society, a guide for visitors to Coquetdale, and a Fellow of the Society of Antiquaries.

David and Mary's only child, William Robert Dixon, was born 12 June 1870 and a few weeks later, on 1 July, David and his father dissolved their partnership in favour of a new partnership with his brother, John Turnbull Dixon. They renamed the store "Dixon Brothers" which, as well as being a general draper and family grocer, became a tea dealer, stationer, bookseller and newsagent.

Some years later, David's son set up business next door, before eventually emigrating to Australia.

In 1911 the store ran into financial problems and the business was handed over to the auditors. David continued to manage the store, but he and his wife were obliged to find somewhere else to live. He was offered a farm cottage at the nearby Cragside Estate by Lord Armstrong, rent free for a year.

Eventually, the store went out of business and David retired. However, Lord Armstrong gave him a job at Cragside as librarian, and he lived out his days at the cottage on the estate.

His wife, Mary, died in 1918 at the age of 71. David Dippie Dixon died on 28 November 1929 and his estate was valued at £261 11s 3d (equivalent to £20,100 in 2023). David and Mary are buried in the cemetery in Rothbury.

Coquetdale House itself still exists on Rothbury High Street, and the shops are now the Vale Tea Rooms and part of the Rothbury Co-Op.

== Writings ==
As an amateur historian, David Dippie Dixon spent many hours reading about and exploring the local area, and writing about his findings, whether they be nature, folk lore or the picturesque views. As a result of his time in Whittingham, his first major work was Whittingham Vale: its History, Traditions, and Folk-Lore published in 1895.

Eight years later he published what is probably his most well-known work, Upper Coquetdale, Northumberland: its History Traditions, Folk Lore and Scenery in which he explores and records the history, wildlife and culture of Upper Coquetdale (the valley of the River Coquet).

In his introduction, Dixon asks the reader to "remember that it has been the leisure-hour employment of two village tradesmen".

This book tells of local life including the annual Shrowe-tide (Shrove Tuesday) Football (using the term loosely) match as "In Rothbury, the custom of football-play on Shrove Tuesday had been observed from time immemorial until the year 1867. The hale (goal) of the Thropton men was the bridge over the Wreigh at Thropton."

Illustrations for the book were drawn by his brother and business partner, John Turnbull Dixon, who married Jane Ann Hindhaugh, Mary's sister.

Both books are significant histories of the area, and original copies are rare and sought after. As a result, Frank Graham publishers produced facsimile copies in the 1970s. The first was Upper Coquetdale in 1974, with a foreword by John Roland Bibby, and the facsimile copy of Whittingham Vale was published in 1979. In more recent years, a number of reprints have become available and both remain fascinating and detailed accounts of the history of the area.

In 2006, Paul Frodsham published "An introduction to Prehistoric Upper Coquetdale, 100 Years after David Dippie Dixon". Originally intended as an updated account of the archaeology, the natural environment and the social history of the upper Coquet valley, the book ended up covering only the pre-Roman archaeology. Nevertheless, it was also an homage to the man who captured the spirit of one of the most beautiful and remote areas of England.
