= Thomas Alcock (surgeon) =

English surgeon

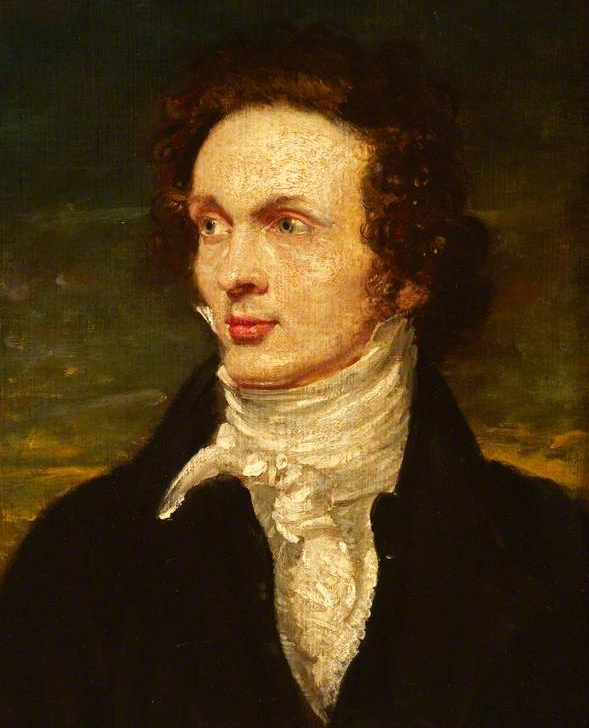
Thomas Alcock by Benjamin Robert Haydon

Thomas Alcock (1784 – 21 August 1833) was an English surgeon.

He was born at Rothbury, Northumberland. After an apprenticeship to a surgeon in Newcastle, he became, in 1805, resident medical officer at the Sunderland Dispensary. In 1806 or 1807 he moved to London and became a general practitioner. From 1825 he devoted himself to surgery alone. From 1813 to 1828 he was surgeon to St. James's Workhouse. A visit to Paris in 1823 led him to publish in 1827 an essay upon the use of the chlorides of soda and lime in cases of hospital gangrene, the practice having been extensively applied in France by Antoine Germain Labarraque. A course of 'Lectures on Practical and Medical Surgery,’ delivered to the students of the Borough Dispensary, appeared in "The Lancet" in 1825–6, and was republished with additions in 1830. He contributed many papers to medical journals.

Alcock met Jeremy Bentham, who was interested in having a life mask made for him, though there is no proof that the mask of Bentham in Edinburgh was made by Alcock.

== Works ==
- An Essay on. the Education and Duties of the General Practitioner in Medicine and Surgery (paper reviewed in the Lancet, 23 Nov. 1823, pp. 266–272).
- An essay on the use of chlorurets of oxide of sodium and of lime, as powerful disinfecting agents etc. (Burgess and Hill, 1827).
