= Boatman (surname) =

Boatman is a surname. Notable people with the surname include:

- Barny Boatman (born 1956), English professional poker player
- Ellie Boatman (born 1997), English rugby union player
- Jeff Boatman (born 1967), American politician
- Michael Boatman (born 1964), American actor and writer
- Peter Boatman, former British police officer
- Ross Boatman (born 1964), English RADA-trained actor
- Shannon Boatman (born 1984), American football player (played in both Canada and US)
- Wes Boatman (born ?), American television composer
