= Thrumming =

Thrumming may refer to:

- Thrumming (textiles)
- Strumming, a musical technique
