= John Roland Bibby =

(John) Roland Bibby (1917–1997) was a Northumbrian-born scholar, poet, writer, historian, and antiquarian.

== Biography ==
John Roland Bibby was born in South Terrace, Cottingwood Lane, Morpeth, Northumberland, in 1917. He spent the whole of his life in Northumberland except for a short period in Glasgow, and another in Gateshead, due to his work, and his war service in Burma in the 1940s.

In 1946 he was in the forefront of the party of people who were instrumental in the formation of the Morpeth Antiquarian Society in 1946, of which he served as chairman for many years. He was one of the prime movers in the foundation of the Northumberland periodical "Northumbriana", helped found the Northumbrian Language Society, wrote a booklet on the "compleat" history of the village of Bothal, and wrote dialect poetry.

In his role as historian, he also wrote innumerable articles for the Morpeth Herald.

From the 1950s, he lectured in History at Blyth. In 1987, he was awarded an honorary M.A. by Newcastle University.

John Roland Bibby died in his beloved Northumberland in 1997.

== See also ==
- Geordie dialect words
