= Thrum Mill, Rothbury =

Building in Northumberland, England

Coordinates: 55.309039°N 1.892161°W

The Thrum Mill is a grade II-listed water mill in Rothbury, Northumberland, England. The water mill dates back to 1665.

== Media ==
The renovation of Thrum Mill by locals Dave and Margaret Heldey into a home was featured on The Restoration Man (2010–present), a home improvement show presented by architect George Clarke, in Series 3: Episode 4 (2014). Clarke's revisiting of the mill a year later was shown in Series 4: Episode Eight (2015).

External videos
- The Restoration Man: Renovation of Thrum Mill (46:58). DIY Daily - Home & Garden. (YouTube)

== Gallery ==
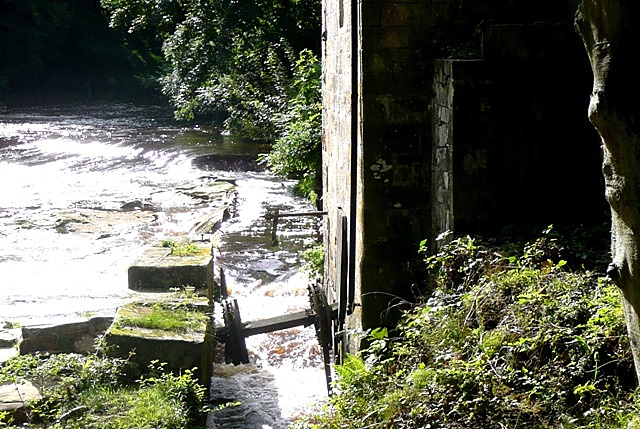

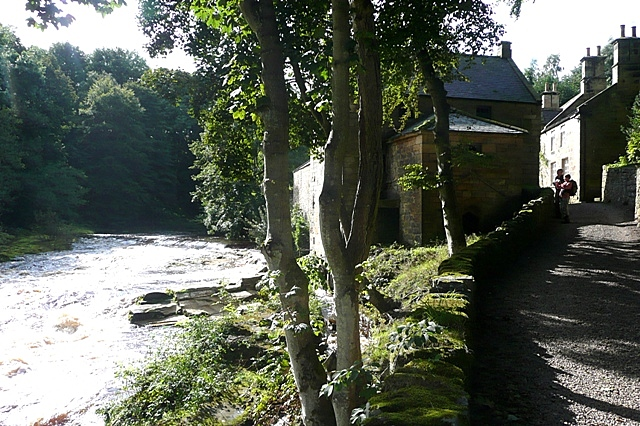

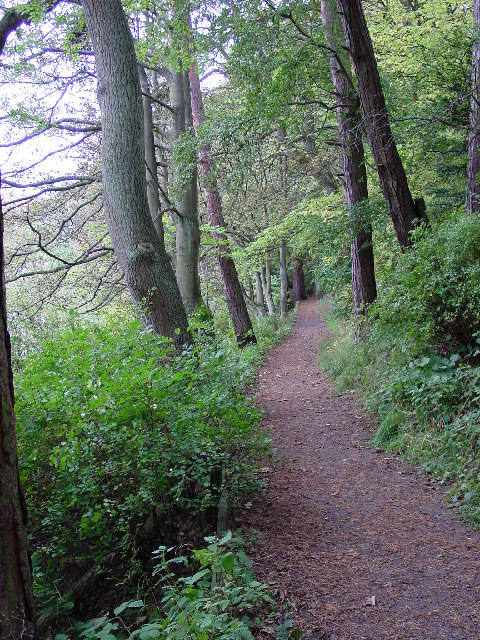

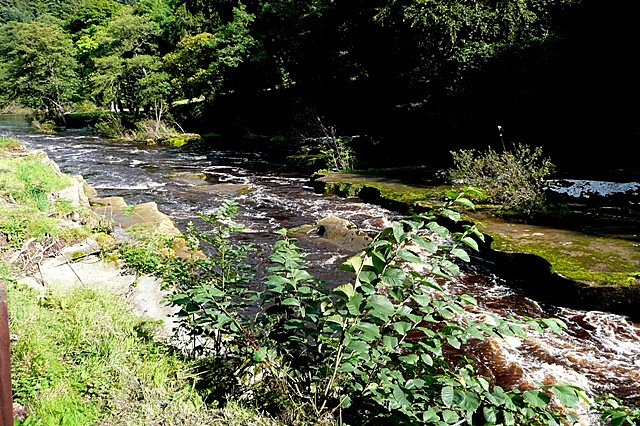
