= Peter Boatman =

British police officer (1953–2010)

Peter Ryan Boatman QPM (1953 – 2010) was a British former police officer who worked as a consultant to the Youth Justice Board, amongst others. He was found dead, in a suspected suicide, in his home on 1 October 2010.

His company, Pro-Tect Systems, was formerly the only authorised importer of Taser devices to Britain. The Sunday Times has claimed that he had a 50% stake in the company while creating the first British police training programme for their use. Their license was revoked as a result of irregularities found during the investigation into the death of Raoul Moat.

Boatman had previously been lampooned by comedian and activist Mark Thomas, who described how Pro-Tect had breached new UK controls on torture equipment and brokerage.

He was awarded the Queen's Police Medal in the 1998 New Year Honours.
