= North Kenton =

Housing estate in Newcastle upon Tyne, England

Coordinates: 55.007°N 1.652°W

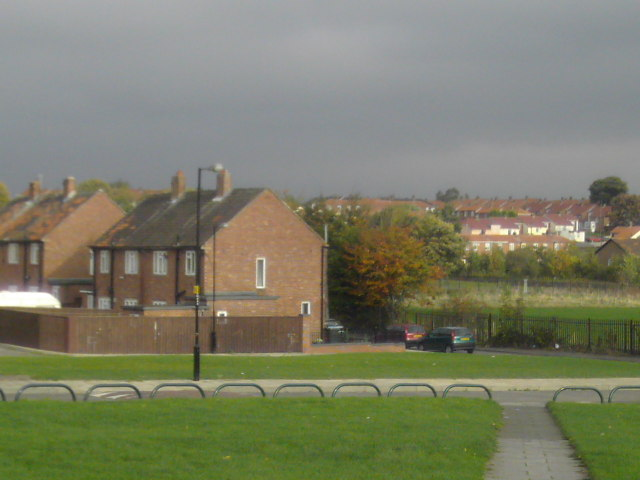
- Montagu Estate

- Location within Tyne and Wear
- OS grid reference: NZ223681
- Metropolitan borough: Newcastle upon Tyne
- Metropolitan county: Tyne and Wear
- Region: North East
- Country: England
- Sovereign state: United Kingdom
- Post town: NEWCASTLE UPON TYNE
- Postcode district: NE3
- Dialling code: 0191
- Police: Northumbria
- Fire: Tyne and Wear
- Ambulance: North East
- UK Parliament: Newcastle upon Tyne North; Newcastle upon Tyne Central

North Kenton is a suburban housing estate in the City of Newcastle upon Tyne, in Tyne and Wear, England, located north west of the city centre and to the east of Kingston Park.

North Kenton is a well known area in Newcastle, known to have a strong community spirit. Once a month, the local tenants and residents group known as North Kenton Tenants and Residents Association, work all year round to create events for the whole community. In August every year they plan the annual Family Fun Day with help funding from local business and Newcastle City Council.

In 2016 North Kenton Tenants and Residents Association launched their website

The area includes a refurbished park, and a sports centre. Buses operate to West Denton, Newcastle General Hospital, Newcastle upon Tyne and the MetroCentre in Gateshead.

Primary education is provided at Mountfield School and St Cuthberts Primary School; Kenton School is the local high school.
