= Home Office Scientific Development Branch =

Defunct UK government research department

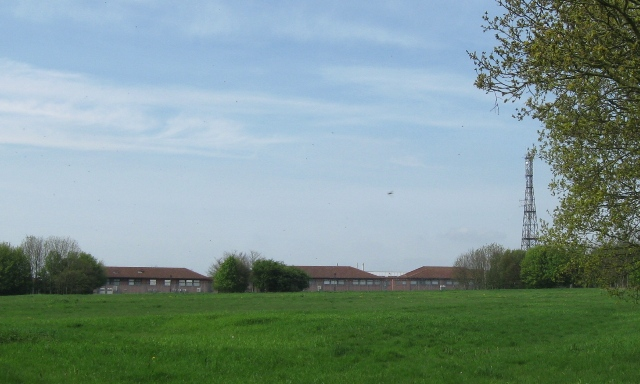
- The Wireless station was a Second World War listening Station for GCHQ.
- Abbreviation: HOSDB
- Formation: Unknown
- Dissolved: Unknown date
- Legal status: Government-owned company
- Purpose: Research
- Location: Sandridge, St Albans, Hertfordshire, England, United Kingdom
- Members: Scientific Development
- Director: Alan Pratt
- Parent organization: Home Office
- Affiliations: UK Police Forces
- Website: HOSDB

The Home Office Scientific Development Branch (HOSDB; formerly the Police Scientific Development Branch) was a branch of the Home Office in the United Kingdom which provided scientific research into new technology that could be used to fight crime.

== History ==
The HOSDB's role was to support the Home Office's strategic aims through the effective application of science and technology. HOSDB would also provide technical support for the UK's police and security services. HOSDB has two sites in the UK: Sandridge, Hertfordshire and Langhurst, West Sussex. The work of the HOSDB involved hi-tech research into countering terrorism, technology to fight crime, borders security, and reducing crime and anti-social behaviour. Their work sometimes involved attending incidents such as the suicide bombings in London on 7 July2005 (aka the 7/7 bombings) in order to assess structural impacts, etc. There were 250 staff: 200 scientists and engineers and 50 support staff, half of whom lived in and around Sandridge, making them a large local employer.

The Home Office Scientific Development Branch underwent restructuring and was officially renamed in April 2011 as the 'Centre for Applied Science and Technology' (CAST).

The www.gov.uk website states that CAST was then integrated with the ‘Defence Science and Technology Laboratory’ (Dstl) on 1 April 2018."
