= East Denton =

Area in Newcastle upon Tyne, England

Coordinates: 54.983°N 1.686°W

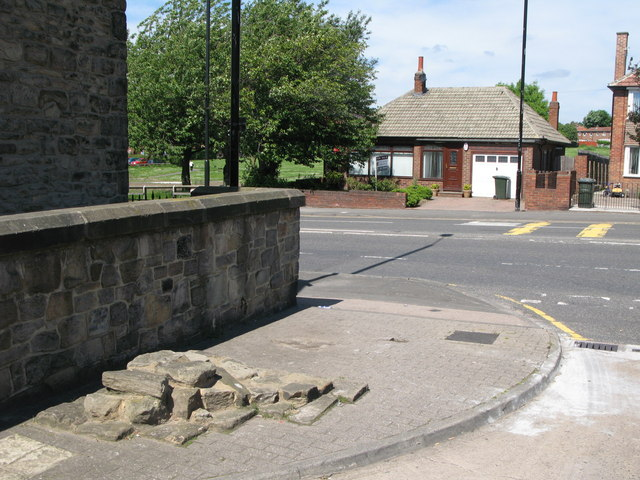
- A fragment of Hadrian's Wall

- Location within Tyne and Wear
- OS grid reference: NZ2065
- Metropolitan borough: Newcastle upon Tyne
- Metropolitan county: Tyne and Wear
- Region: North East
- Country: England
- Sovereign state: United Kingdom
- Post town: NEWCASTLE UPON TYNE
- Postcode district: NE5
- Dialling code: 0191
- Police: Northumbria
- Fire: Tyne and Wear
- Ambulance: North East
- UK Parliament: Newcastle upon Tyne North

East Denton is an area in the city of Newcastle upon Tyne in the county of Tyne and Wear, England. Until 1974 it was in Northumberland.

East Denton Hall, dating from 1622, was in the 18th century the seat of the prominent Montagu family. Elizabeth Montagu, the cultural critic and founder of the Blue Stockings Society, spent some time there. To the east of the Hall a waggonway led from the Caroline Pit to the coal staithes by the river Tyne in Scotswood. Bishops House, East Denton Hall, to give it its formal name, was the official residence of the Roman Catholic Bishop of Hexham and Newcastle until 2020, when it was sold.

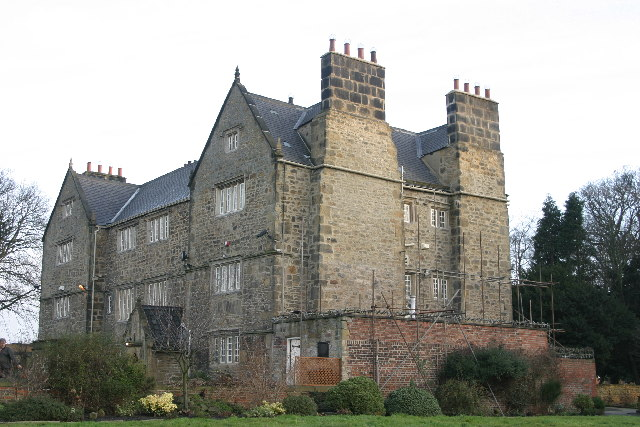
Denton Hall - geograph.org.uk - 103155

== History ==
East Denton was formerly a township in the parish of Newburn, in 1866 East Denton became a separate civil parish, on 1 April 1935 the parish was abolished and merged with Newburn and Newcastle upon Tyne. In 1911 the parish had a population of 27,049. It is now in the unparished area of Newcastle upon Tyne.
