= Thrumming (textiles) =

Fabric-working thickening technique

Thrumming is a technique in which small pieces of wool or yarn (thrums) are pulled through fabric to create a wooly layer. The term thrum originally referred specifically to worthless pieces of warp thread which remained after weaving a piece of fabric using a loom, though its meaning has since broadened to include any small pieces of wool or thread which are used in a similar way.

== Applications ==
=== Thrum caps ===
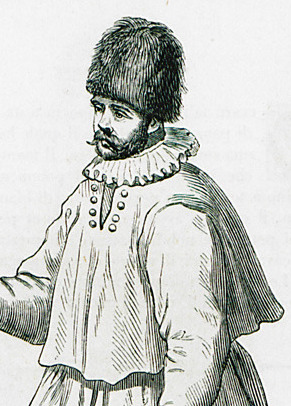
Illustration of an English sailor wearing a thrum cap

A thrum cap (or thrummed cap) consisted of a canvas base in the shape of an inverted flower pot, with woolen thrums pushed through to create a shaggy exterior. Such caps were worn by sailors in the Tudor period, and were commonly dyed blue or brown. They continued to be in use into the seventeenth century.

=== Stuffed mittens ===
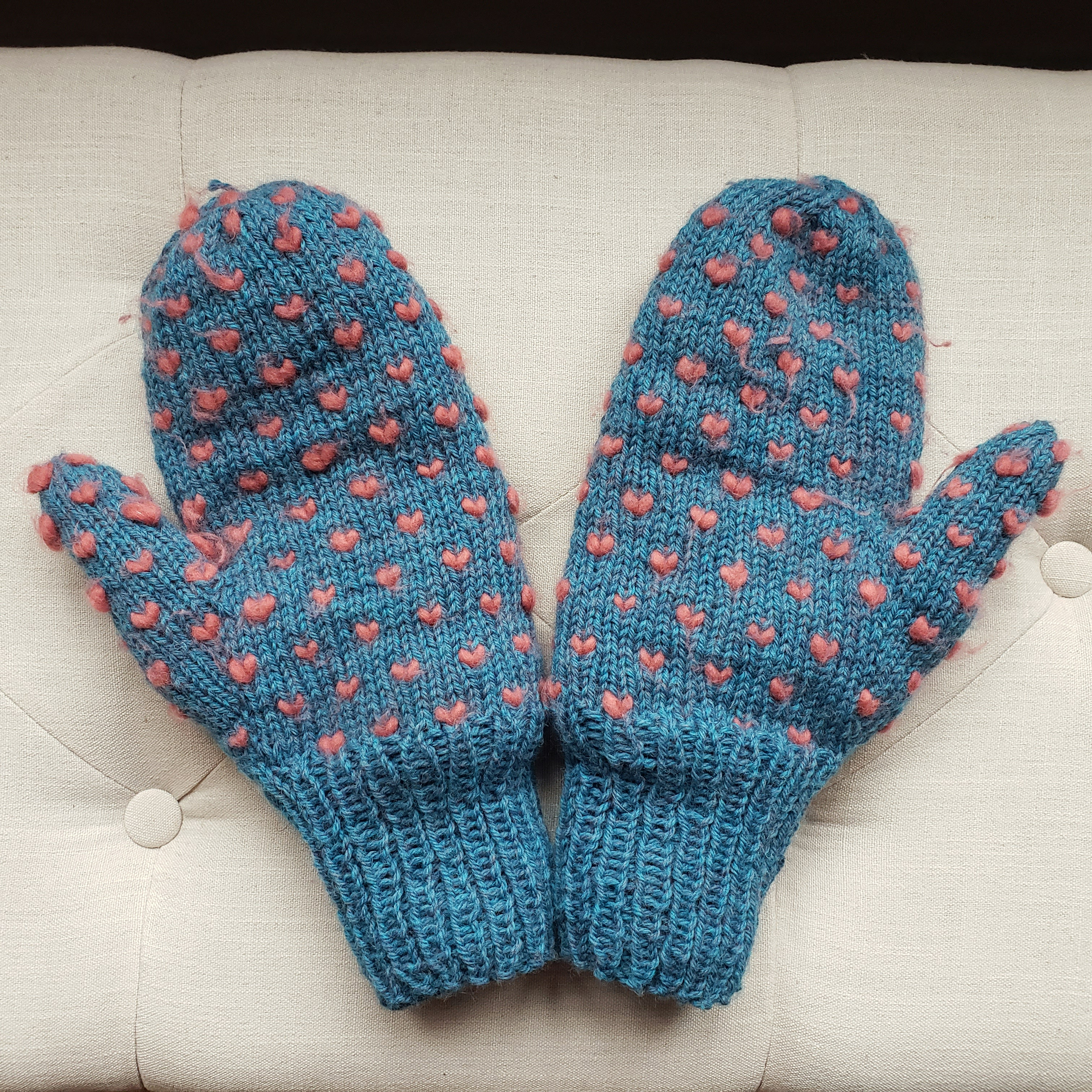
A pair of stuffed or thrummed mittens. The thrums are visible on the outside as pink nodes. In the interior, the thrums blossom into a fluffy texture.

Stuffed mittens (also known in Newfoundland and Labrador, where they are traditionally made, as "thrummed mittens") are thrummed with tufts of fleece to create a warm, fluffy interior which gradually felts with use. The same technique may also be applied to line winter caps and other knitted articles.

The writer Robin Orm Hansen published a pattern for stuffed mittens in her 1983 pattern book Fox and Geese and Fences. According to Hansen, the technique was largely unknown at the time, being limited to Newfoundland and Labrador and a single family in Maine. It has since become more widely known and practiced.

=== Rugs ===
Historically, sailors created mats by pulling thrums through a stiff woven base of burlap or rope. These "thrum mats" were used to prevent the ropes of a ship's rigging from chafing. The writer William Winthrop Kent has conjectured that these mats were a precursor to the technique of rug hooking.
