= List of places in Tyne and Wear =

This is a list of cities, towns, suburbs and villages in the ceremonial county of Tyne and Wear, England.

== A ==
Albany, Annitsford, Ashbrooke, Ayton, Abbey Farm, Abbey Grange, Arthurs Hill

== B ==
Backworth, Barlow, Barmoor, Barmston, Barnes, Battlefield, Benton Square, Benwell, Bill Quay, Birtley, Blackfell, Black Callerton, Blackhall Mill, Blakelaw, Blaydon, Blucher, Boldon, Boldon Colliery, Brandling Village, Brenkley, Brunswick Village, Brunton Bridge, Brunton Park, Burradon, Byker, Black Callerton, Bells Close

== C ==
Callerton Lane End, Camperdown, Carley Hill, Carr Hill, Castletown, Chapel House, Chapel Grange, Chapel Park, Chartershaugh, Chopwell, Clara Vale, Claxheugh, Cleadon, Coalburns, Colliery Row, Columbia, Concord, Cowgate, Cox Green, Coxlodge, Crawcrook, Crookhill, Cullercoats, Cragston Park, Cradlewell, Cochrane Park, Church Green

== D ==
Deckham, Deptford, Dinnington, Donwell, Doxford Park, Dudley, Dunston, Denton Burn, Darras Hall, Dissington, Denton Park

== E ==
Earsdon, East Denton, East Holywell, East Rainton, Elswick, Etal Park, East Boldon

== F ==
Farringdon, Fatfield, Fawdon, Felling, Fence Houses, Fenham, Ford Estate, Forest Hall, Fulwell, Fairways, Four Lane Ends

== G ==
Gateshead, Glebe, Gosforth, Grangetown, Greenside, Grindon, Greystoke Park

== H ==
Halls Estate, Harraton, Harton, Hastings Hill, Haydon Grange, Hazlerigg, Heaton, Hebburn, Hendon, Herrington, Hetton-le-Hole, Heworth, Highfield, High Callerton, High Heaton, High Newport, High Spen, Holystone Interchange, Heddon-on-the-Wall, Hillheads, Holywell, Houghton-le-Spring

== J ==
Jarrow, Jesmond

== K ==
Kenton, Kibblesworth, Killingworth, Killingworth Village, Kingston Park, Kenton Bank Foot, Kenton Bar

== L ==
Lambton, Lamesley, Leadgate, Leam Lane, Lemington, Lintzford, Longbenton, Low Fell, Little Benton

== M ==
Marley Hill, Marden, Marsden, Melton Park, Millfield, Monkseaton, Monkton, Monkwearmouth, Moorside, Murton Village, Montagu Estate, Manor Park

== N ==
Newbottle, Newburn, Newcastle upon Tyne, New Herrington, New Horton Grange, New Silksworth, New York, Nookside, North Brunton, North Shields, North Walbottle, Newcastle Great Park, North Kenton, Nuns Moor

== O ==
Old Hartley, Oxclose, Old Benwell

== P ==
Pallion, Paradise, Pelaw, Pennywell, Penshaw, Preston, Palmersville, Philadelphia, Prestwick Village, Parklands, Ponteland

== R ==
Redhouse, Rickleton, Roker, Rowlands Gill, Ryhope, Ryton, Regent Farm, Red House Farm

== S ==
Scotswood, Seaburn, Seaton Burn, Seaton Sluice, Seghill, Sheriff Hill, Shieldfield, Shiney Row, Shiremoor, Silksworth, South Denton, South Hylton, South Shields, Southwick, Spital Tongues, Springwell village (Nr Washington), Springwell (Sunderland), Street Gate, Sulgrave, Sunderland, Sunniside, Swalwell, St. John's, Slatyford, South Gosforth, South West Denton, Sandyford, Saltmeadows, St. Anthony's

== T ==
Team Colliery, Team Valley, Thorney Close, Throckley, Tynemouth, Tunstall, Tudor Grange, Teams

== U ==
Urpeth, Usworth

== W ==
Walker, Walbottle, Wallsend, Washington, Washington Village, Westerhope, Westoe, West Holywell, West Moor, Whickham, Whitburn, Whitley Bay, Wideopen, Willington, Willington Quay, Windy Nook, Winlaton, Winlaton Mill, Wrekenton, Whitebridge Park, West Denton, Whorlton, Whorlton Grange, West Jesmond, Walkerville, Walkergate, West Denton Park, West Denton Hall, West Boldon

== See also ==
- List of places in England
