= Laura Jane Clark =

British television host

Laura Jane Clark is a British architect, TV presenter and author. Her work includes presenting Your Home Made Perfect with Angela Scanlon on BBC2 and Netflix, Channel 4’s Ugly House to Lovely House, George Clarke's Amazing Spaces and Shed of the Year. She also converted a former underground public lavatory in Crystal Palace into a one-bedroom apartment.

== Television ==
In 2012, Clark completed the renovation and conversion of some derelict underground toilets in Crystal Palace, south east London. She had been negotiating with the council to be given the permission to purchase and convert them for nearly seven years. The completed build caught the attention of local and national UK media. Plum Pictures were developing a new design programme, Amazing Spaces with George Clarke, at the time, and after appearing in the first series, Clark was asked to film a Christmas special and subsequently she became a judge on the televised version of the Shed of the Year alongside Max McMurdo and Will Hardie.

Amazing Spaces Shed of the Year ran for four series, from 2014 to 2017. Clark then presented designs on two episodes of Ugly House to Lovely House in the first two series of the show before deciding to leave Channel 4.

In 2018, Clark joined the BBC to be one of two architects in the television series Your Home Made Perfect with Angela Scanlon, which ran for four seasons with Clark being the only original architect to be kept on the show.

== Writing ==
Clark writes for magazines such as Ideal Home, Home Building and Renovation, and Real Homes, and has a monthly column in Reclaim Magazine. She presents at trade shows and exhibitions, and talks at schools and universities. She is currently writing a book The Handbook of Home Design: An Architect's Blueprint for Shaping Your Home, due for publication in September 2022.

== MMA/K1 ==
Competing in amateur kickboxing and Muay Thai bouts, Clark discovered mixed martial arts in 2009 and joined New Wave Academy and started training under former welterweight UFC fighter and The Ultimate Fighter competitor, Nick Osipczak. In 2012, she started to fight competitively in MMA and K1 with a record of 3-1.

Clark currently lives outside Glasgow and is renovating a derelict Georgian house.
