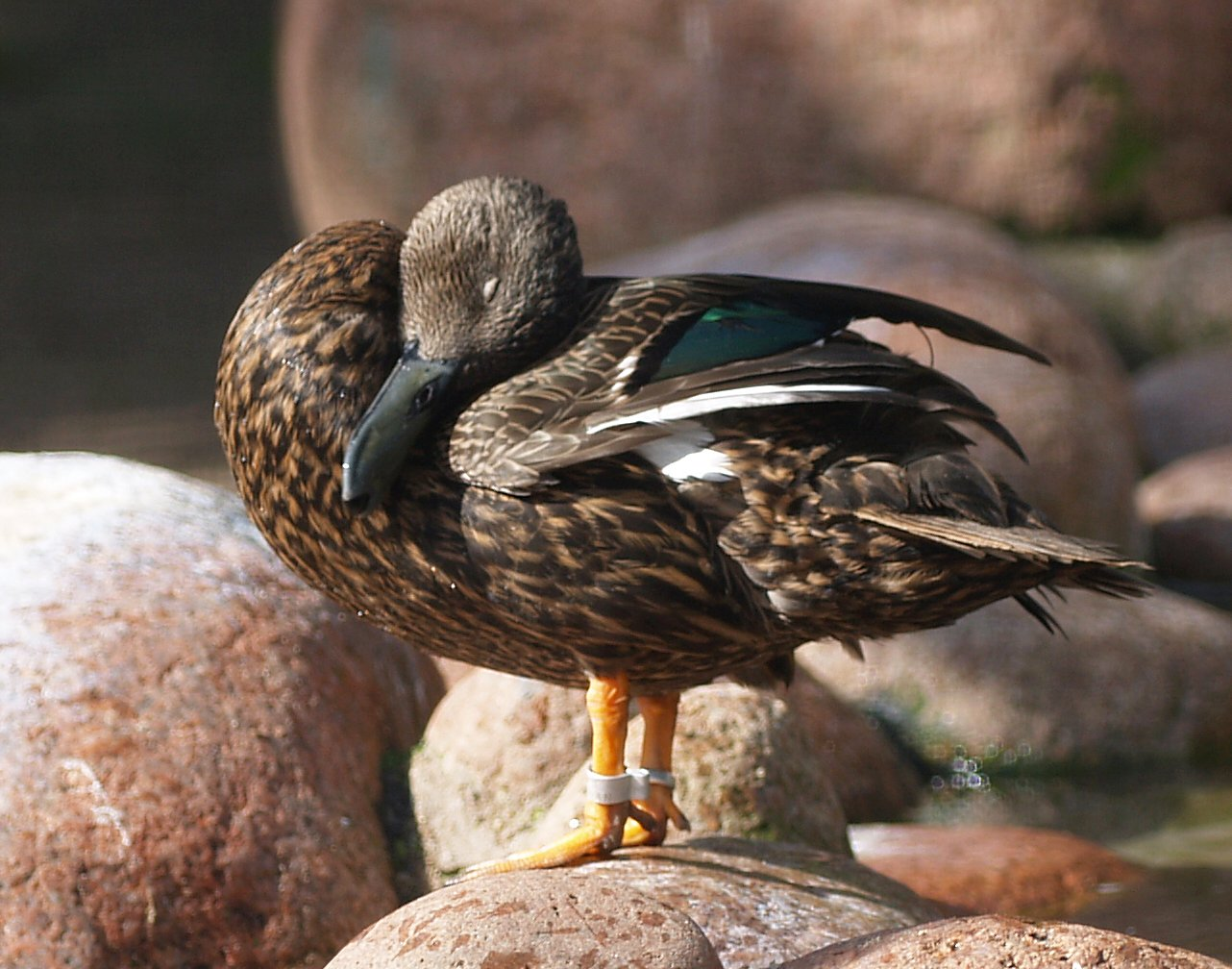
- Sexes look alike. Note lack of supercilium.
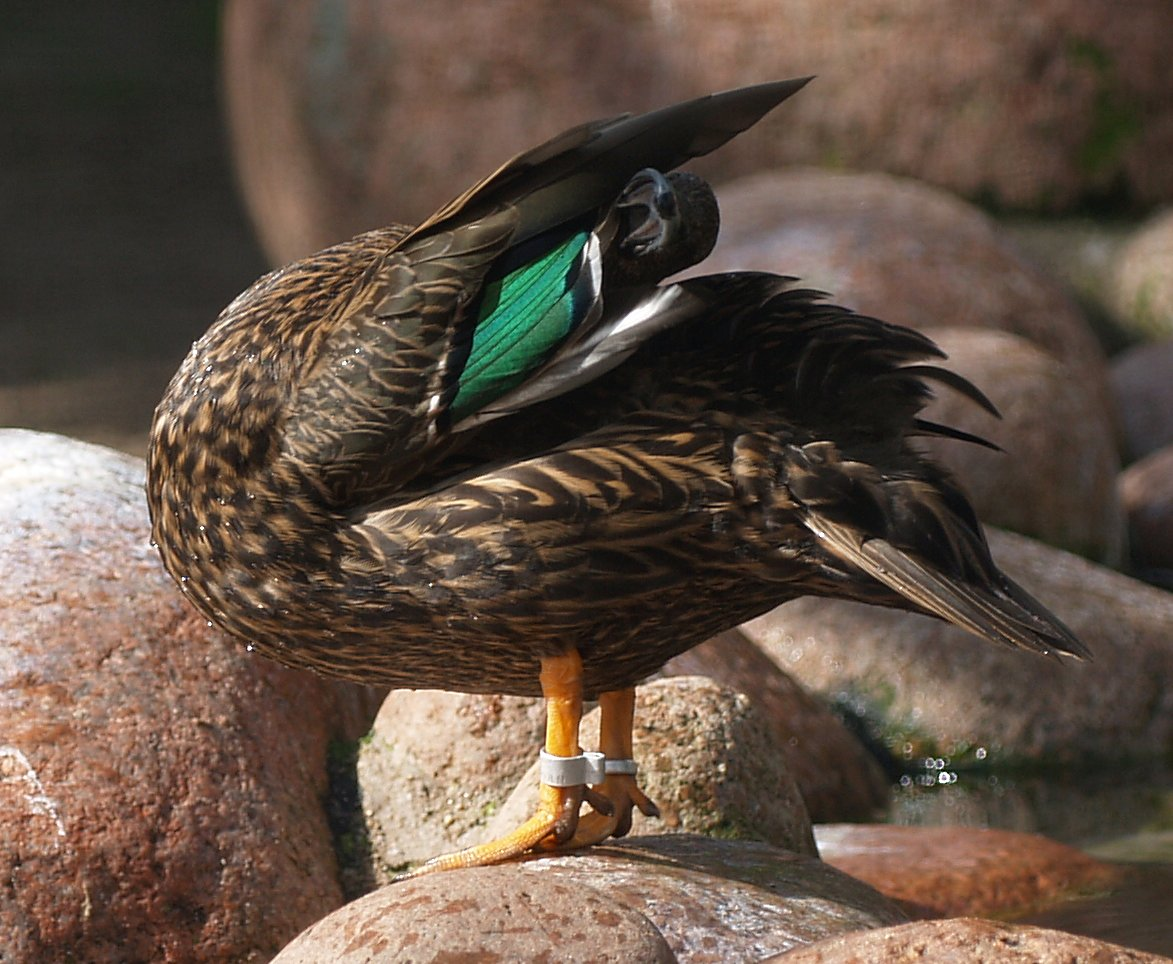
- Note color of speculum feathers

Conservation status
- Endangered (IUCN 3.1)

Scientific classification
- Kingdom: Animalia
- Phylum: Chordata
- Class: Aves
- Order: Anseriformes
- Family: Anatidae
- Genus: Anas
- Species: A. melleri

Binomial name
- Anas melleri Sclater, PL, 1865
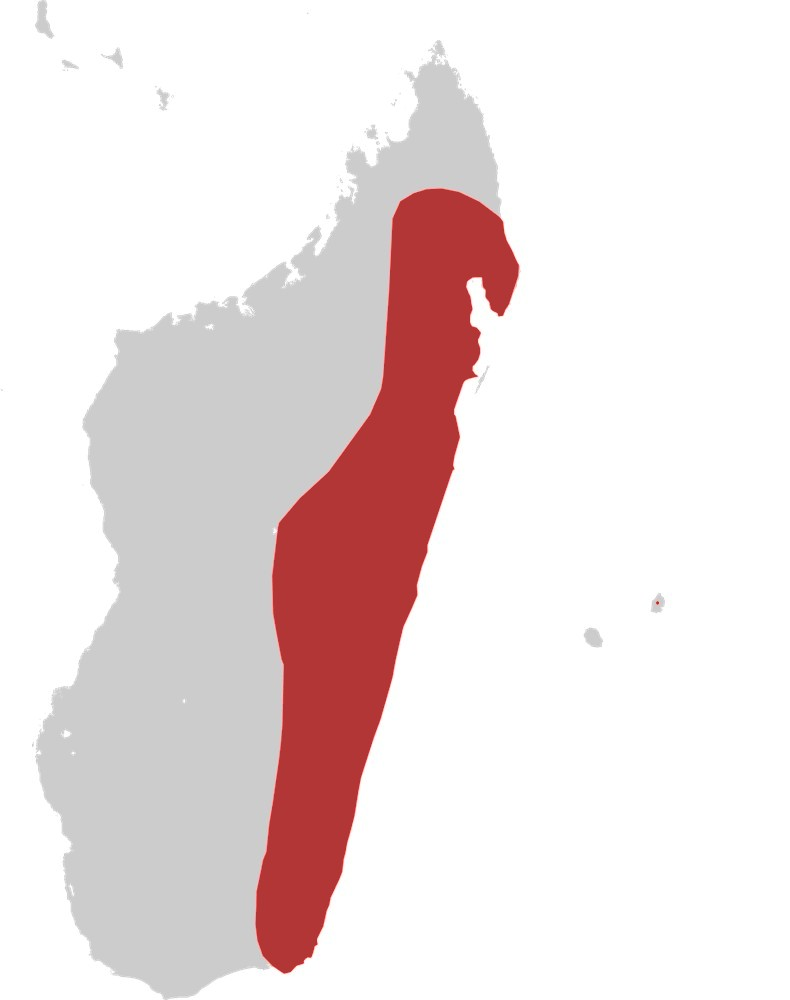
- Distribution of the Meller's duck

Synonyms
- Anas platyrhynchos melleri

= Meller's duck =

Meller's duck Temporal range: Chibanian–Present

Species of bird

Meller's duck (Anas melleri), also known as angaka or akaka in Malagasy, is a species of bird in the dabbling duck genus Anas. It is endemic to eastern Madagascar. Although a population was established on Mauritius in the mid-18th century, this population has likely been pushed into extinction due to habitat loss and competition by feral domestic ducks.

== Taxonomy ==
The species was first described by English zoologist Philip Lutley Sclater. The syntypes, two adults collected from the marshes of Analamazoatra, were collected in 1863 by botanist Charles Meller, and were initially identified as red-billed teals (Anas erythrorhyncha). Upon later comparison of these to other Anatidae specimens from Madagascar, Sclater realized they represented a new species, which he described in 1864 as Anas melleri. The specific epithet of this species is after Charles Meller.

The taxonomic status of Meller's ducks has been a subject of considerable debate. It is grouped within the mallard (Anas platyrhynchos) clade of Anas, and has historically been treated as a recent, island-derived divergence from mallards. The similarity of adults to female mallards and early behavioral studies on courtship & hybridization with mallards in captivity lead to arguments that Meller's ducks represented only a secondary island-derived subpopulation, subspecies, or even a color morph of mallards.

More recent phylogenetic studies, including mitochondrial DNA D-loop sequence comparisons, have supported Meller's ducks as a behaviourally & genetically distinct species. It is also likely an older species than mallards, constituting a basal African lineage in the mallard clade along with the African black duck (A. sparsa) and the yellow-billed duck (A. undulata). African black ducks are the most basal species of this lineage and are ancestral to both Meller's ducks and yellow-billed ducks, who are each other's closest relatives and together form the infragenus Afranus. The two species likely diverged from the African black duck around 1.8±2.0mya, and from each other around 1.0mya.

== Description ==
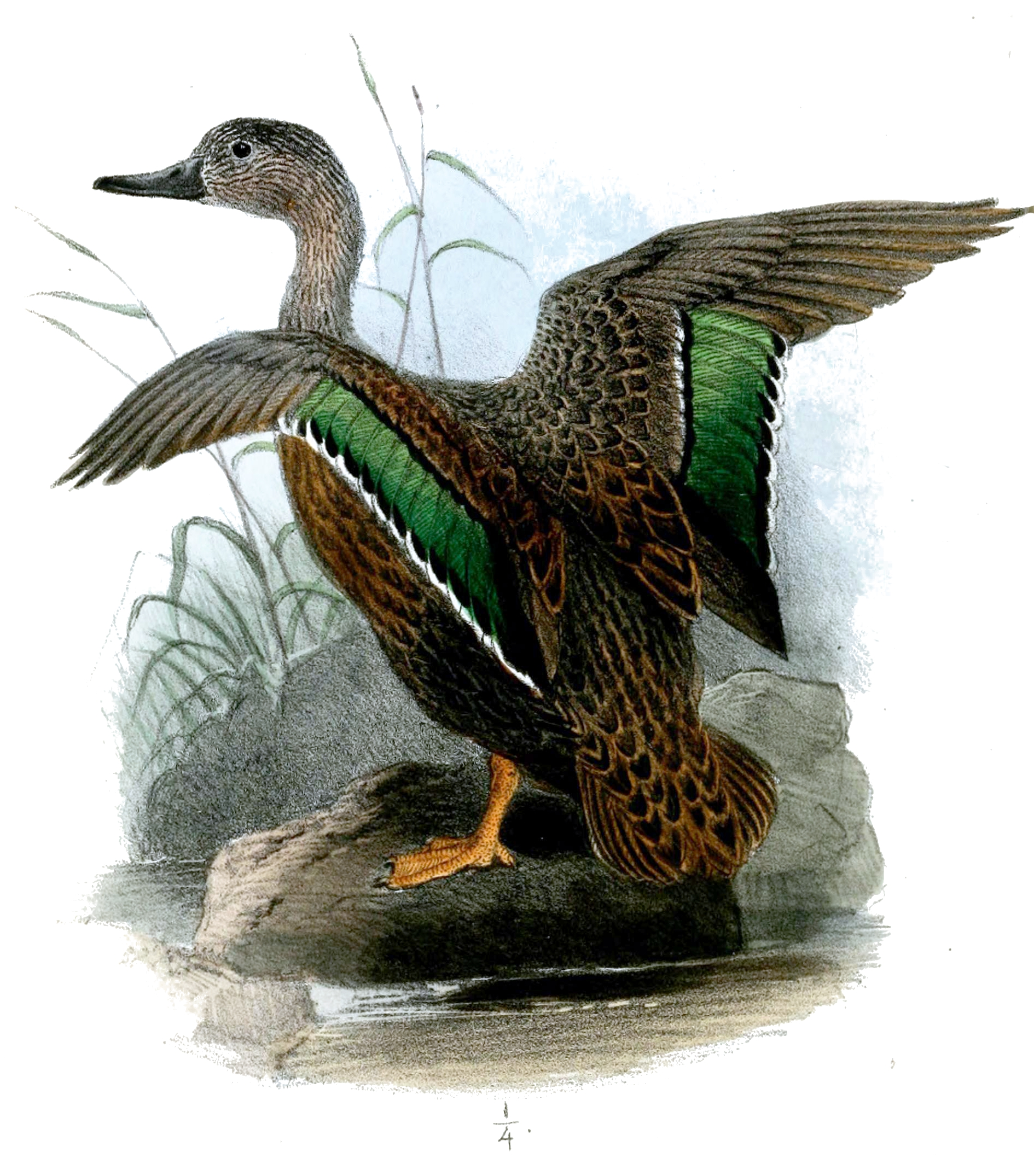
Illustration by Joseph Wolf (1864)

At 55–68 centimetres (22–27 in), the Meller's duck is slightly larger than an average mallard, with a larger neck and bill. It is one of the largest species of Anatidae found in Madagascar, with males weighing 883–1,240 g (1.947–2.734 lb) and females 831.5–1,140 g (1.833–2.513 lb). Meller's ducks resemble a large female mallard or a mottled duck (Anas fulvigula), but can be distinguished by an overall larger size, a longer neck and bill, reddish fringes to their feathers, and the lack of a pale supercilium found in most mallard relatives.

Adults have dark mottled brown plumage, fringed paler brown with irregular reddish barring on the upperparts and wider fringes on the underparts. The speculum feathers are a glossy iridescent green, bordered with a broad velvety-black band and narrow white tips. The underwing coverts are whitish.

The head and neck are brown, with uniform fine, dusky-brown streaking and a dark or sienna-brown eye. It has a long and heavy, relatively narrow dark blue-gray to grayish-olive bill, with a black nail and individually variable dark markings at the base. The legs and feet are orange. Males have no eclipse plumage, although there is a flightless period of around 4 weeks. Juveniles sport stronger rusty reddish feather fringes than adults, particularly on the underparts.

Meller's ducks are sexually monomorphic. Although both sexes are very similar in appearance, there are subtle differences between males and females. Adult males are generally larger, with a larger head and longer bill. All males have a narrow black band at the base of the bill, which is not found in females. The legs and feet may be duller orange-brown with dark webbing in females and juveniles, and a brighter orange in adult males. The plumage of adult males has a stronger reddish tinge and two long, all-black central tail feathers, which are sometimes upturned in older males. In females, the tail feathers are all brown-edged and shorter.

Their voice is similar to that of the mallard. Males give a soft, dry kreep or raeb call, which is repeated three times, instead of twice as mallard drakes do. The female's inciting and decrescendo calls are thinner and more high-pitched than a female mallard's.

== Distribution and habitat ==
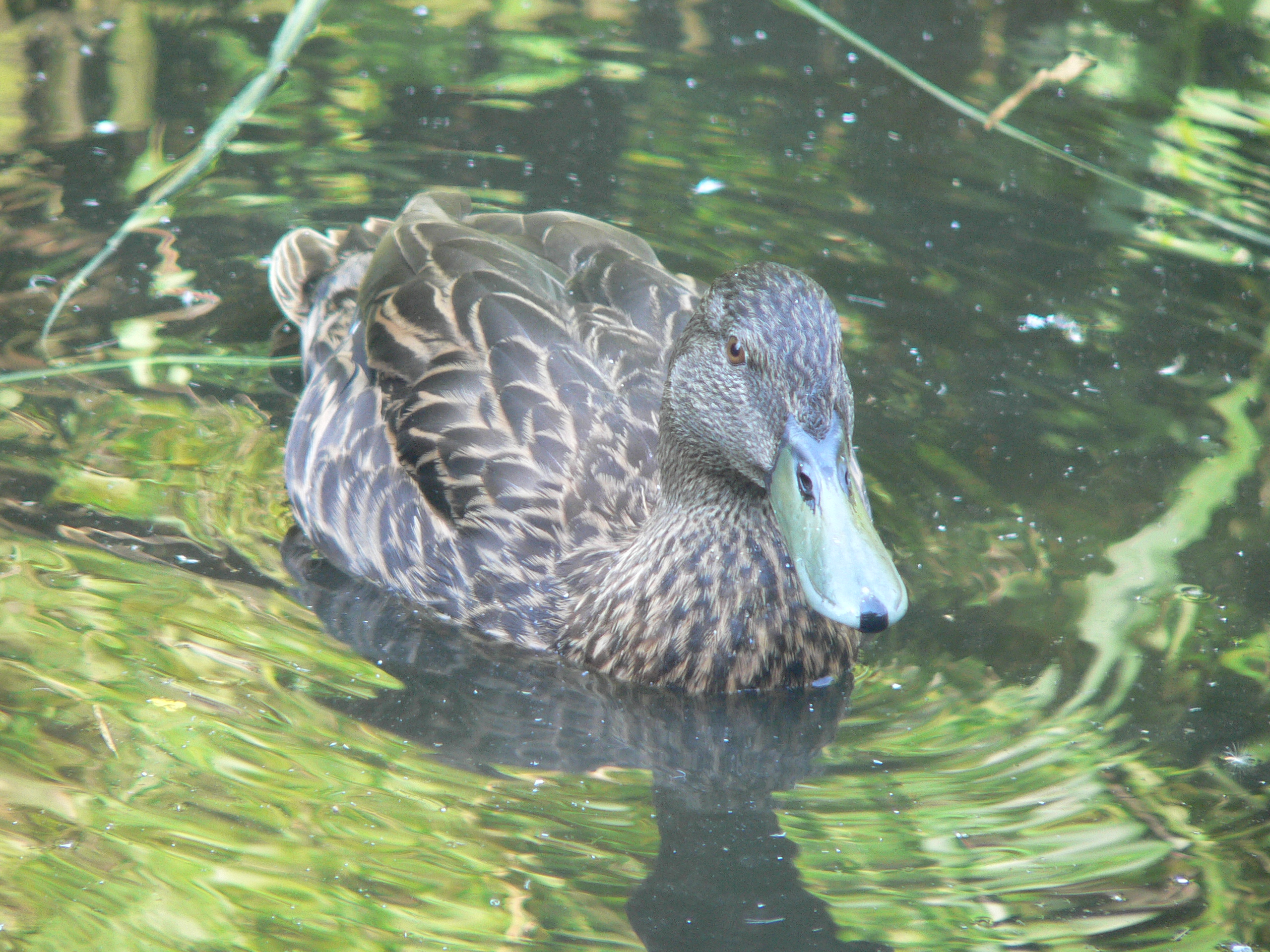
Meller's duck on the water

The Meller's duck is endemic to the eastern & northern slopes of the Madagascan central highlands, where it is found in freshwater lakes, rivers & streams, permanent wetlands, and woodland ponds. They may prefer sluggish rivers, but are also recorded from fast-flowing waters. They are also found in agricultural areas, primarily in flooded rice fields. These ducks are specialists of the streams & small rivers of the eastern drainage patterns of humid forests in the central highlands. Uncommonly, there are populations on the western edges of the plateau, found in the wetland habitats and major lakes of isolated massifs, such as Lake Kinkony or Lake Bemamba, Port Berge, and Bombetoka Bay.

They occur at elevations up to 2,000 m (6,600 ft). They are sometimes found in lower-elevation freshwater rivers, shallow lakes, and flooded grasslands along the coast, such as Canal des Pangalanes. Records of Meller's ducks found in western Madagascar below the central highlands likely represent vagrant or wandering birds, or post-breeding dispersals. It is not known to wander naturally outside of Madagascar.

Lake Alaotra is the largest lake of Madagascar, and the only significant freshwater lake within the range of the Meller's duck. The lake and its surrounding wetlands likely represent the primary habitat for Meller's ducks in Madagascar. Although they are not known to nest at Lake Alaotra, the largest numbers of birds have been recorded there.

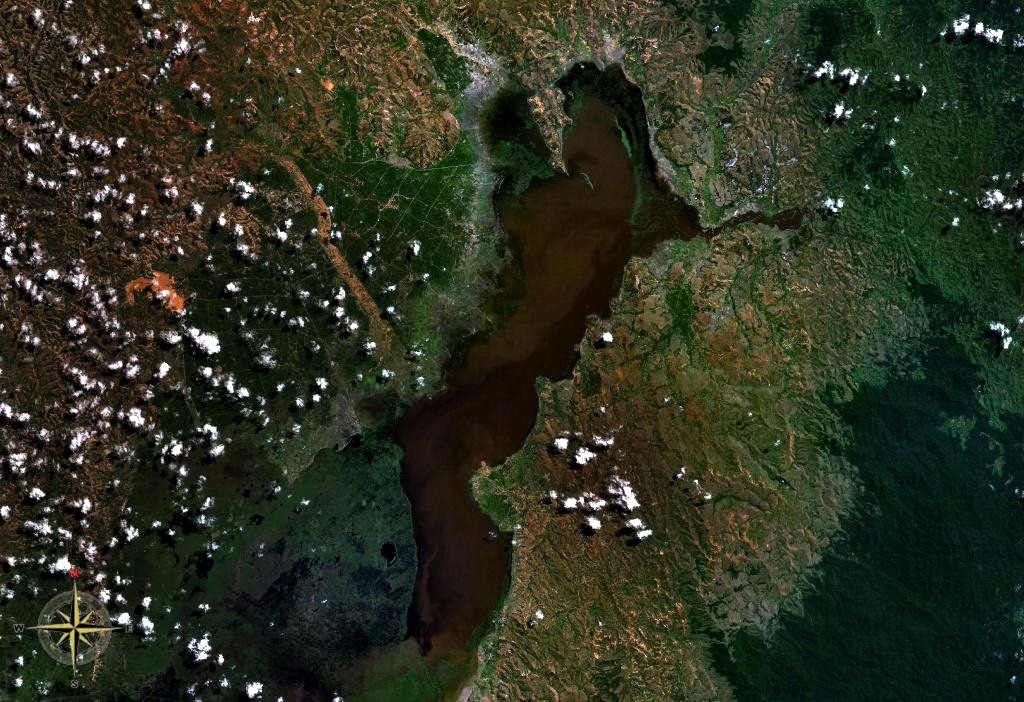
NASA satellite image of Lake Alaotra, the primary habitat for Meller's ducks

Meller's ducks were introduced to Mauritius, likely in the late 1700s or early 1800s, by European settlers, but the Mauritian population is most likely extinct. By 1985, it was outnumbered by mallards, which had been introduced to the Mare Longue, Mare aux Vacoas (a significant breeding site), and Piton de Milieu reservoirs in 1979. Mallards displaced Meller's ducks from the Tamarind Falls reservoir, and the population also suffered intense hunting pressure and predation by introduced rats and mongooses. By the 1970s, the population of Meller's ducks on Mauritius was estimated at about 30 to 40 individuals, and it was likely extirpated from the island completely by 1993. They at one time were introduced to, and bred on, the nearby island of Réunion, but are now extirpated there.

== Behaviour and ecology ==
Meller's ducks feed by dabbling in the mud of ponds & streams, but may also forage on land. They consume primarily seeds and other parts of aquatic plants as well as invertebrates, particularly molluscs. Some individuals will dive and chase aquatic insects across the water's surface. They have been noted to eat small fish, chironomid flies, filamentous algae, and grasses in captivity. As they are recorded from rice fields, they likely feed on the stubble and rice grains available there. Feeding is generally done during the daytime, but can also take place at night.

Meller's ducks at Vakona Private Reserve in Madgascar

They are often found either singly or in pairs, and occasionally in small parties of three or four. Non-breeding birds may sometimes congregate in higher numbers on the larger lakes of the central highlands to roost and feed, with flocks ranging from a few hundred birds to as many as 1,480 having been recorded at Lake Alaotra. These large flocks sometimes mingle with other species, such as the glossy ibis (Plegadis falcinellus). They are likely sedentary, although they may undertake small-scale seasonal movements; records in western Madgascar probably represent wandering birds, or potential post-breeding dispersal.

In captivity, they are notably quite aggressive towards other duck species; drakes defend their mates more aggressively than mallards, and fight other males more frequently. Females are aggressive towards both sexes.

== Breeding ==
Breeding habitat for Meller's ducks consists of inland freshwater pools, rivers, and marshes in regions of thick, swampy forest, mostly at elevations of 800–1,500 m (2,600–4,900 ft). It particularly prefers undisturbed rivers and the small streams and backwaters near lakes for breeding. Meller's ducks are known to be intolerant of human disturbance, especially when nesting. They often move out of areas following human arrival, and will completely abandon nesting sites if human disturbance takes place.

As with other sedentary tropical ducks of the southern hemisphere, the lack of a distinct breeding plumage in males may enable Meller's ducks to breed whenever environmental conditions are suitable. Their breeding season is extended, with nesting recorded from July through April. The Mauritian population was recorded nesting in October and November. The exact timing of their breeding season is likely dependent on local conditions, particularly the onset of the rainy season (November through January at Lake Alaotra).

During the breeding season, Meller's ducks typically occur only in monogamous pairs. Both the male and female are highly territorial and aggressive, particularly towards conspecifics, and vigorously defend a well-defined territory together, which is unusual amongst dabbling ducks. Male Meller's ducks have not been documented seeking forced extra-pair copulations, as mallard drakes do, and aggressively defend their mate. Pairs remain together until their young fledge, and are known to defend territories of up to 2 km (1.2 mi) in length.

Meller's duck at Alarobia Lake, in Parc de Tsarasaotra

Early behavioral studies done on birds bred and raised in captivity (and possibly foster-reared by mallards) reported that female Meller's ducks readily and preferentially mated with the more colorful drakes of Holarctic species in captivity, preferring them over drakes of their own species. It was suggested that the plumage of Holarctic drakes served as 'supernormal releasers', stimulating female Meller's ducks more strongly than the 'normal releasers' of their own species. Subsequent studies on captive Meller's ducks have not had the same results; wild-caught female Meller's ducks generally display little to no interest in mallard drakes, and are notably aggressive towards other species.

The nest of the Meller's duck is a bulky structure, built by females of leaves, dry grass, and other vegetation, and lined with down and fine plant matter. Nests are often located on or near the ground, on the banks of streams and rivers amidst patches of herbaceous vegetation. Females lay a clutch of between 5 to 11 yellowish-white or cream-colored eggs, one per day, which are then incubated for 28 to 29 days. Males do not incubate, but remain close by the nest. After hatching, chicks have grayish olive-brown down on their upperparts with yellow patches on the sides, and pale chestnut down on their face and underparts. Chicks fledge in 9 to 11 weeks, after which point they seem to be accompanied only by the female; there are no records of males observed with young. Sexual maturity is achieved at one year.

== Conservation ==
This species is listed as an endangered species by the IUCN Red List, and it is a nationally protected species in Madagascar. Conservation efforts for the Meller's duck have been hampered historically by its debated taxonomic placement, particularly the argument that it represented only a variant or island subpopulation of the common mallard and not a unique species. The overall population is estimated at 2,000 to 5,000 birds, with about 1,300 to 3,300 mature individuals, all of which appear to be within a single subpopulation. Although Meller's ducks may have at one point been abundant throughout suitable habitat in eastern Madagascar, they have now disappeared from many sites throughout their historical range, with a suspected overall rate of decline between 30% and 49%.

Two captive Meller's ducks at WWT Washington Wetland Centre

Population decline in the Meller's duck is likely driven largely by habitat loss, habitat degradation, and hunting pressure. Ongoing deforestation in the central highlands, expanding agricultural land use, and the loss of about 60% of Madagascan wetlands between 1950 and 1994 have drastically reduced the amount of available habitat for these birds. Within its remaining habitat, deforestation and soil erosion have also led to a degradation of water quality in rivers & streams. Lake Alaotra's wetlands have suffered large-scale habitat destruction in the latter half of the 20th century, and local waterbird populations have declined dramatically. Although the population at Lake Alaotra is believed to be stable, it has suffered a substantial decline.

A marked decline in Meller's ducks was first noted in the 1970s, which was attributed largely to hunting. It is reportedly a preferred target for subsistence hunting and trapping at Lake Alaotra, being taken year-round; a 2001 estimate based on interviews with hunters there suggested some 450 individuals are taken annually, representing 18% of the global population.

Invasive carnivorous fish like largemouth bass (Micropterus salmoides) and snakeheads (Channa spp.) may pose a threat to young, and prompt breeding birds to avoid or abandon nesting habitat which would otherwise be suitable. Hybridization with introduced mallards could represent an additional threat to conservation. While hybridization between Meller's ducks and mallards in the wild has been recorded, it has also been suggested that the territorial aggression and differing courtship rituals of the Meller's duck may preclude or reduce hybridization in the wild.

Meller's ducks in captivity, at Cologne Zoological Garden

At least 12 regions in which the Meller's duck is known to occur are protected areas, including Lake Alaotra, Bemanevika, and the Tsaratanana-Marojejy corridor, and it is also known from 14 Important Bird Areas.

Due to its drab plumage and territorial habits, this species is not very popular among aviculturalists, although it reproduces readily in captivity. There have been captive breeding programs in European Association of Zoos and Aquaria zoos and wildlife parks since 1977 as a part of the EAZA Ex-Situ Programme, including Jersey Zoo, the Washington Wetland Centre, and Zürich Zoo. As of July 2021, the EEP program for Meller's ducks consisted of 158 animals across 28 institutions.
