= Fatfield Woods =

Woodland in Tyne and Wear, England

- Location within Tyne and Wear
- Interactive map of Fatfield Woods

Geography
- Location: Tyne and Wear, England
- OS grid: NZ305543
- Coordinates: 54.882°N 1.525°W
- Area: 8.99 hectares (22.21 acres)

Fatfield Woods is a woodland in Tyne and Wear, England, near Washington. It covers a total area of 8.99 hectares (22.21 acres). It is owned and managed by the Woodland Trust.
