= Jane Clark =

Jane Clark may refer to:

- Jane Inglis Clark (1859/1860–1950), Scottish mountaineer
- Jane Forbes Clark (born 1955), American businesswoman
- Laura Jane Clark, British author
- Mary Jane Clark (born 1954), American author
- Tyler-Jane Mitchel (born Rebecca Jane Clark; 1973), New Zealand actress
