= Harraton =

District in Tyne & Wear, England

Coordinates: 54.881°N 1.534°W

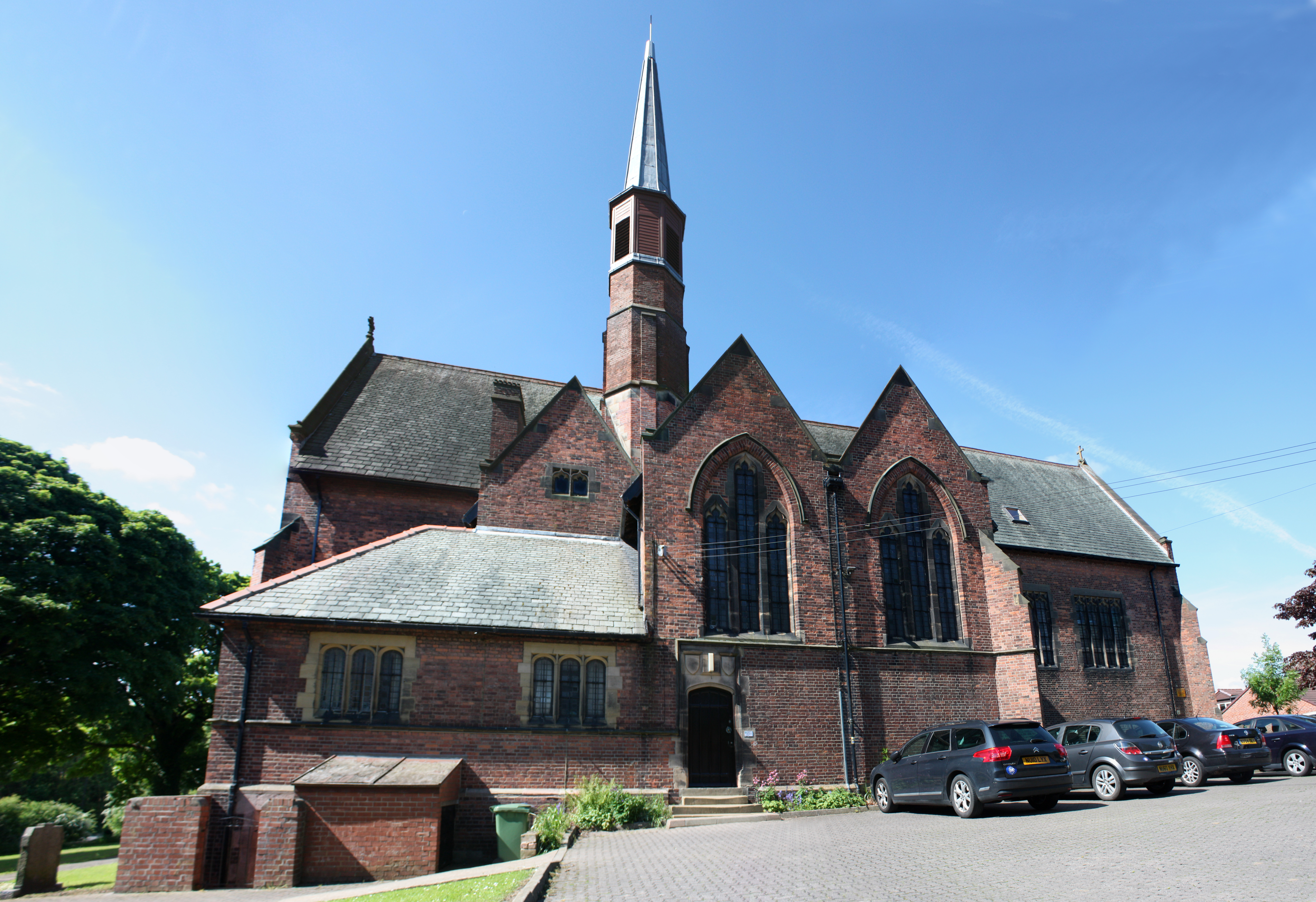
- St George's church, Harraton

- Location within Tyne and Wear
- Population: 2,878
- OS grid reference: NZ29475479
- Metropolitan borough: Sunderland
- Metropolitan county: Tyne and Wear
- Region: North East
- Country: England
- Sovereign state: United Kingdom
- Post town: WASHINGTON
- Postcode district: NE38
- Dialling code: 0191
- Police: Northumbria
- Fire: Tyne and Wear
- Ambulance: North East
- UK Parliament: Sunderland

Harraton is a suburb of Washington, in the Sunderland metropolitan borough, in Tyne and Wear, England. Harraton is near the River Wear and is 3 miles north-east of Chester-le-Street, 2 miles south-west of Washington town centre and 9 miles south-southwest of Sunderland.

When nearby Washington (historically a village) was founded as a new town under the New Towns Act in 1964, Harraton alongside the neighboring villages of Chaters-Hough, Fatfield, Cox Green and Picktree became suburbs of Washington forming the southern suburbs of the town. Certain developments also took place for overspill for the nearby towns of Chester Le Street and Houghton-le-Spring (also in the City of Sunderland metropolitan borough). It is on the main road serving Seahouses and the northern coast. Harraton was a civil parish until 1974.

== Etymology ==
The name Harraton was recorded in c. 1190 as Hervertune is of Old English origin. The first part of the name is from here-ford, which refers to a ford suitable for the passage of an army (compare Hereford). The second element is tun ("farm, settlement").

== History ==
Harraton and the aforementioned villages formed at one time part of the chapelry of Birtley. Harraton was a township in the Chester-le-Street parish, a sub-district and registration district. Harraton became a civil parish in 1866. The parish was abolished on 1 April 1974, with the part within the designated area for Washington New Town being added to the new metropolitan borough of Sunderland and the remainder becoming a new parish called North Lodge which stayed in County Durham. In 1971 the parish had a population of 4,325.

John Wilson's 1870-1872 Imperial Gazetteer of England and Wales describes Harraton thus:

"The manor belongs to the Earl of Durham; and has his seat, Lambton Castle, on an eminence adjacent to the Wear. There is a chapel-school of the Established church, and chapels for Wesleyans and Primitive Methodists. The sub-district contains Washington parish, and six townships and a chapelry of Chester-le-Street parish."

The Anglican parish church of St George's Fatfield is in Harraton, and the ecclesiastical parish of Fatfield also includes Mount Pleasant, Picktree, and Rickleton. The church was built in 1879 on land given by the Earl of Durham. The church was massively reordered in the 1980s and inside is warm, light and contemporary.

Harraton Colliery Chapel was built in 1873 financed by the Earl of Durham and is of brick construction seating 150, the building is still standing. It was used by the Primitive Methodists. This particular branch of Methodism had as its aim the recovery, as they saw it of the principles and practice of the early Methodists which had been lost or at least played down. The chapel was the chosen place of worship for believers of the working classes, where as the Anglican Church was seen as the domain of the "bosses". The Chapel functioned as a place of worship until 1932 when it closed.

The Harraton War Memorial was unveiled on 24 July 1922. It was originally sited on Worm Hill, but was relocated in 2012. 102 names are recorded.

There was a primary school, Harraton Primary School, which closed in 2004.

== Mining ==
The first recorded coal produced at Harraton Colliery in 1594. During the English Civil War the trade in Tyne coal was halted. The Port of Sunderland however became significant in the supply of coals to London. Harraton Colliery cam e under the control of Scottish soldiers who were aligned to the Parliamentarian cause and was of some significance in this trade.

Large scale mining started in 1794. The 1870-1872 Imperial Gazetteer of England and Wales recorded that "Coal was extensively worked; but the majority of the coal pits are exhausted.", and the pit closed in May 1965, with many of the miners migrating to the modern pits in Nottinghamshire. The poet Jock Purdon wrote Farewell to Cotia about the pit's closure and the "exodus" to Nottinghamshire.

=== 1817 explosion ===
Row Pit, Harraton Colliery was the scene of a fatal explosion on Monday, 30 June 1817. Some miners were sent to work in an area of the colliery which was not free from firedamp and the men were expressly ordered to use safety lamps. One man, John Moody, ignored this instruction and was observed using a candle. The overman ordered Moody to extinguish the candle, which he did. Shortly afterwards Moody was again found using a candle and reprimanded. He extinguished the candle and lit his lamp. The overman had just left him when the explosion occurred. 38 of the 41 men underground were killed, including a grandfather, his two sons and seven grandsons.

Two days later eight workmen descended Nova Scotia Pit, part of the same colliery. When they did not return another party went down but were forced back by chokedamp. Late on the following day six bodies were recovered and there was "little hope of recovery for the other two". All eight were recorded as being buried on 5 July.
