= Oxclose Community Academy =

Location
- Dilston Close; Oxclose; Washington, Tyne and Wear, NE38 0LN; England
- Coordinates: 54.89629°N 1.54535°W

Information
- Type: Academy
- Local authority: Sunderland City Council
- Department for Education URN: 138923 Tables
- Ofsted: Reports
- Headteacher: Amanada Parkes
- Gender: Coeducational
- Age: 11 to 16
- Enrolment: 1,112
- Website: http://oxclose-sunderland.frogos.net/

Oxclose Community Academy (formerly Oxclose Community School) is a coeducational secondary school located in Oxclose in the town of Washington, Tyne and Wear, Tyne and Wear, England.

The school was rebuilt in 2007 under the Building Schools for the Future programme. Previously a community school administered by Sunderland City Council, Oxclose Community School converted to academy status in November 2012 and was renamed Oxclose Community Academy. However the school continues to coordinate with Sunderland City Council for admissions.

Oxclose Community Academy offers GCSEs and BTECs as programmes of study for pupils. Graduating students usually go on to attend Usworth Sixth Form or Sunderland College. The school is also the location of the North East of England Japanese Saturday School. It is also the second location of the Pauline Cook School of Dance.

== Notable former pupils ==
- George Clarke, architect
- Adam Barnes, Newcastle Eagles Professional Basketball Player
- Daniel Chapman, bassist with The Loves and Pocketbooks
