= Max McMurdo =

British designer (born 1977)

Max McMurdo (born 24 September 1977) is a British designer, upcycler, entrepreneur and TV presenter.He studied at Sandy Secondary school for a few years and graduated from Bournemouth University in 2000 with a degree in Product Design Visualisation and was awarded an Honorary Doctorate of Arts in 2023.

McMurdo established Reestore Ltd in 2003 when he became uneasy at the consumption-focused ways of the traditional design world.In 2007, McMurdo appeared in episode 4 of BBC2's Dragon's Den; he has since worked with George Clarke on George Clarke's Amazing Spaces and with Kirstie Allsopp on Kirstie's Fill Your House For Free, both for Channel 4 television. Max also, occasionally, appears alongside fellow presenter Henry Cole on Find it, Fix it, Flog it, also for Channel 4 television.
