= George Clarke (television presenter) =

British architect

George Anthony Clarke
- Born: 27 May 1974 (age 52); Sunderland, England
- Education: Oxclose Comprehensive School; Newcastle University; University College London
- Occupations: Television presenter, architect, lecturer, author
- Employer(s): Channel 4 (2008—present); Channel 5 (2004–07)
- Television: Presenting: The Restoration Man; The Home Show; George Clarke's Amazing Spaces
- Website: Official website

George Anthony Clarke (born 27 May 1974) is an English architect, television presenter, lecturer and writer, best known for his work on the Channel 4 programmes The Home Show, The Restoration Man, George Clarke's Old House New Home, and George Clarke's Amazing Spaces.

== Early life ==
Clarke was born in Sunderland and brought up on a council estate in Washington. His mother, Anne, worked at Oxclose Comprehensive School, in Oxclose, where Clarke was a pupil. His father, a printer, died at the age of 26 from a water-skiing accident; George was 7 at the time. His mother later remarried. By his own account, Clarke was a very shy teenager.

Both Clarke's grandfathers were builders and, after spending school holidays in and around building sites, he decided he wanted to be an architect from the age of 12:

There was nothing else I ever wanted to do. When most of the kids were playing with building blocks and pieces of Lego, I was actually on building sites.

Clarke studied for a BTEC in Building and Construction at Wearside College, Sunderland, before gaining a First Class BA Honours in Architectural Studies and a Certificate in Architectural Practice from Newcastle University School of Architecture, Planning and Landscape, followed by a post-graduate diploma from London's Bartlett School of Architecture. Whilst he was a student, Clarke supported himself by renovating people's homes in his spare time.

== Career ==
=== Architecture ===
After graduating in 1995, Clarke trained and worked with FaulknerBrowns in Newcastle upon Tyne, before joining the Terry Farrell practice, working in both London and Hong Kong. In 1998, with partner Bobby Desai, he formed his own company, clarke:desai. Clients included Simon Fuller and Jamie Oliver.

In 2011, Clarke left clarke:desai and set up a new company, George Clarke + Partners, with 25 staff. The firm was primarily involved in renovation and refurbishment projects, and it also designed new buildings. The company was dissolved in August 2023.

Between 2001 and 2003, Clarke was a visiting lecturer at Newcastle University. He is currently a visiting lecturer at Nottingham University's School for the Built Environment.

Clarke has set up a charity organisation called Ministry of Building Innovation and Education (MOBIE) which is designed to train and inspire young people into the innovation and design of homes in the U.K. and abroad. MOBIE also designed a course in partnership with Teesside University.

=== Television ===
Clarke's television career came about by chance. He approached a literary agent after being asked to write a book about architecture, not realising the agency also represented television presenters. He was subsequently asked to screen test for a new Channel 5 programme called Build A New Life in the Country, which had been struggling to find a suitably charismatic building professional to front the show. Clarke was offered the job, and then went on to present two more property shows for Channel 5 before being commissioned to present The Restoration Man for Channel 4.

Since 2004, he has been the main presenter for the following programmes: Property Dreams (2004), Dream Home Abroad (2005) and Build A New Life in the Country (2005–07), all for Channel 5. The Home Show (2008—), The Restoration Man (2010 —), The Great British Property Scandal (2011), The Great British Property Scandal: Every Empty Counts (2012), George Clarke's Amazing Spaces (2012—), Ugly House To Lovely House (2016–2020), Old House New Home (2016—), George Clarke's Remarkable Renovations (2021—), George Clarke's Building Home (2025—), George Clarke’s Beautiful Builds (2025—) and the upcoming series Two Houses, One Home, all for Channel 4.

In the later part of 2020, he presented a six part series for Channel 4 visiting National Trust properties which were closed during the coronavirus pandemic (George Clarke's National Trust Unlocked).

During early 2024, Clarke presented George Clarke's Adventures in Americana, a four-part series about the various nostalgic styles of American buildings.

In February 2025, the Advertising Standards Authority (ASA) banned an advert for Scottish Power, which featured Clarke. The ASA received three complaints that the advert was not obviously distinguishable from Clarke's Amazing Spaces TV series. The ASA banned the advert on the grounds that viewers were "likely to believe [they] were watching a programme".

In August 2025, George Clarke’s Homes in the Wild, a six-part series featuring Clarke visiting some of the wildest homes along New Zealand’s coastline and Australia’s eastern seaboard, premiered on Sky Open.

He was part of Strictly come dancing

=== Books ===
Clarke is the author of several books, including Home Bible (Orion), and Build a New Life: by Creating Your New Home.

His first children's book, Building a Home, was released on 1 February 2024.

=== Other positions ===
Clarke was on the judging panel of the Affordable Home Ownership Housing Awards in 2007. In April 2012, he was appointed as an independent adviser to the government to help bring thousands of empty properties back into use for families in need of stable, secure homes. Clarke is a patron of the Civic Trust Awards scheme. He is an ambassador for the housing and homeless charity Shelter, as well as a Building Community ambassador for the Prince's Foundation. He is also a supporter of Sunderland A.F.C.

In January 2025, it was announced that Clarke is an ambassador for the National Trust. In October 2025, it was announced that Clarke would become the Chancellor of Northumbria University

== Personal life ==
Clarke grew up with three younger sisters.

He met his first wife, Catriona, a Spanish national, when he undertook renovation work for her brother. The couple were married for over 10 years. They had three children before separating in 2013 and subsequently divorcing.

Clarke subsequently married Katie Morgan Jones in 2018, but reportedly split from her in 2022.

Clarke lives in Notting Hill, West London and Gloucestershire. He has completely renovated his 1910 house in Notting Hill, transforming the interior into a modern home, whilst restoring the exterior to its original appearance.

He still has family in Blackfell, Washington, and Sunderland, and visits the area at least two or three times a year.

== Honours ==
In July 2012, Clarke carried the Olympic torch through Camden after his brother-in-law Swiggy Drummond, who was the original candidate for the honour, died of cancer.

In January 2014, Clarke became the youngest person ever to be awarded honorary membership of the Royal Institution of Chartered Surveyors (Hon RICS). In July 2015, Clarke was conferred with an Honorary Doctorate of Arts from Leeds Beckett University for his contribution to the arts. In September 2015, he received an honorary doctorate from the University of Wolverhampton as a Doctor of Technology and, in December 2015, he received an honorary doctorate from Northumbria University. In July 2023, he received an honorary doctorate from Teesside University.
