= Biddick Academy =

Location
- Biddick Lane; Washington, Tyne and Wear, NE38 8AL; England

Information
- Type: Academy
- Motto: A safe place where we all promote and enjoy the highest individual achievement through friendship, excellence and respect
- Local authority: City of Sunderland
- Department for Education URN: 139839 Tables
- Ofsted: Reports
- Headteacher: Kate Morris
- Gender: Coeducational
- Age: 11 to 16
- Enrolment: 1107
- Colours: Black, white, heather Grey
- Website: http://www.biddickacademy.co.uk/

Biddick Academy (formerly Biddick School Sports College) is a coeducational secondary school and academy. The current headteacher is Kate Morris. The school has a specific area for special educational needs students called SEND.

== Notable former pupils ==
- Matthew Wylie, swimmer
