= Albany, Tyne and Wear =

Albany
- Suburb
- Location in Tyne and Wear
- Coordinates: 54.909°N 1.541°W
- OS grid reference: NZ295572
- Sovereign state: United Kingdom
- Country: England
- District: Tyne and Wear

Albany is a suburb of Washington in the City of Sunderland in Tyne and Wear, historically part of County Durham. It is in the north of the town. The village is also relatively close to The Galleries Shopping Centre, Washington.

== Washington 'F' Pit museum ==
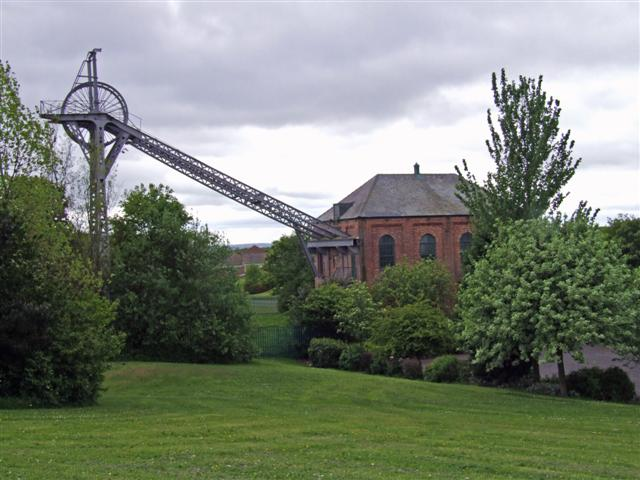
The 'F' Pit museum in Albany

The Washington 'F' Pit museum is in the village, consisting of an engine house and winding gear built atop one of the earliest colliery shafts in the country. In 1775 a lease was given to William Russell enabling him to mine coal on the Washington estate. He sank eight pits (designated 'A' to 'I') in the ensuing years; 'F' pit is believed to date from 1777. Mining was halted in 1796 due to an explosion flooding the pit and stopping production. Operations recommenced in 1821 In 1856 the pit was extended down to a depth of 660 feet in order to access the Hutton Seam; in 1954 it was further deepened to reach the Busty Seam at a depth of 927 feet. For a time it was the most productive pit on the Washington coalfield, employing over 1500 men and garnering an annual total of 486,000 tons of usable coal in 1964–5. It was closed on 21 June 1968 as part of the National Coal Board's modernisation programme. The winding house and headgear were opened as a museum in 1976.

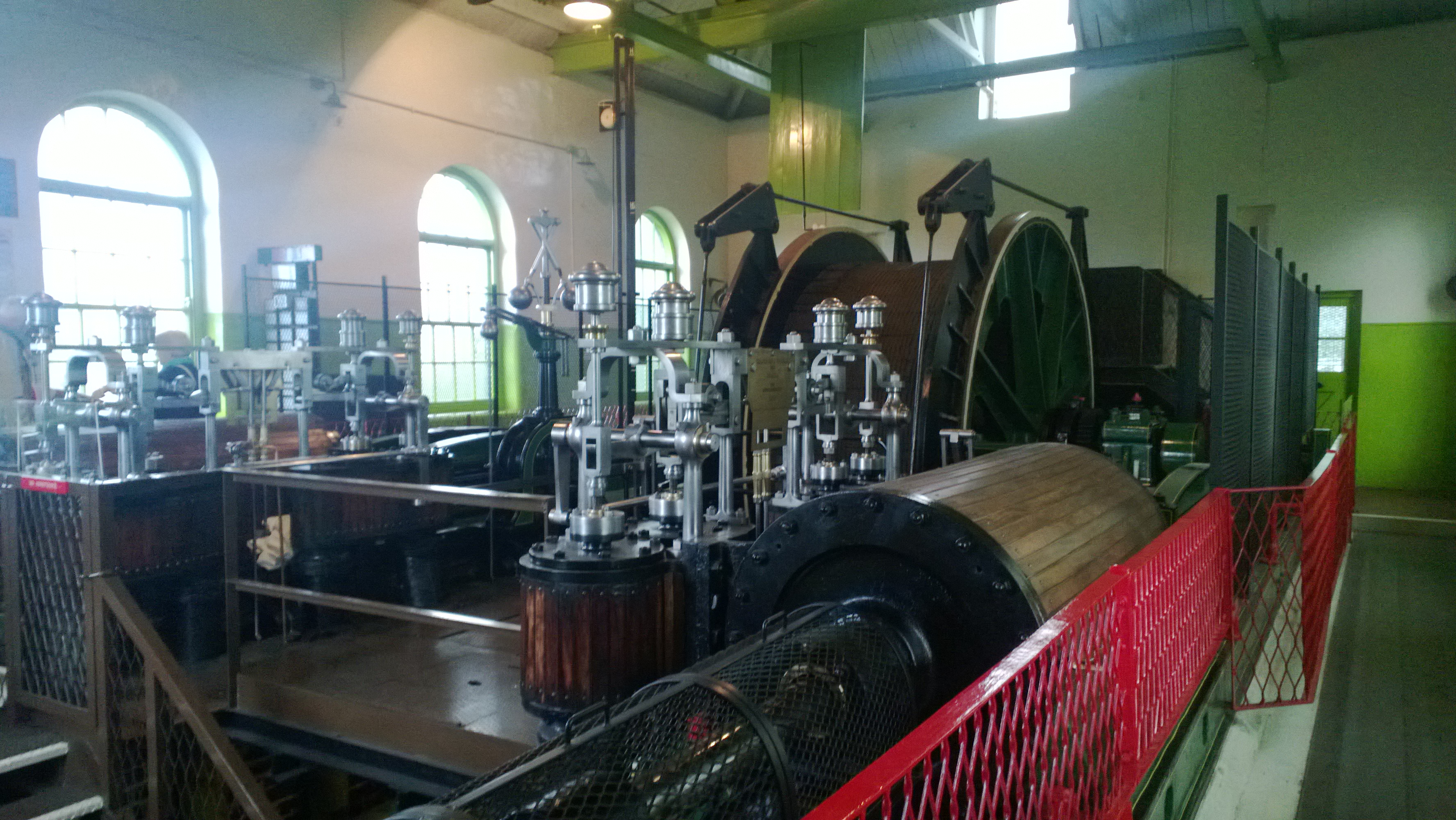
The 1888 steam winding engine

The engine house was built in 1903 to house a steam winder engine (which had previously been in use elsewhere). It is Grade II listed. The engine, which remained in regular use until the pit's closure, is still in situ. It is an 1888 horizontal, simplex (i.e. non-compound) steam engine built by the Grange Iron Company of Durham City. The same company oversaw the re-siting of the engine in 1903, and they took the opportunity then of adding their latest patent steam expansion valves to maximize the engine's efficiency.

The 'F' Pit museum is one of the few remaining physical reminders in Washington of the countless colliery installations which once dominated the area. It is open to the public, but on an irregular basis; as well as displays and exhibits, the engine can be viewed in motion (driven by electric motor).
