= Fatfield =

Area of Washington, Tyne and Wear, England

Coordinates: 54.880624°N 1.537083°W

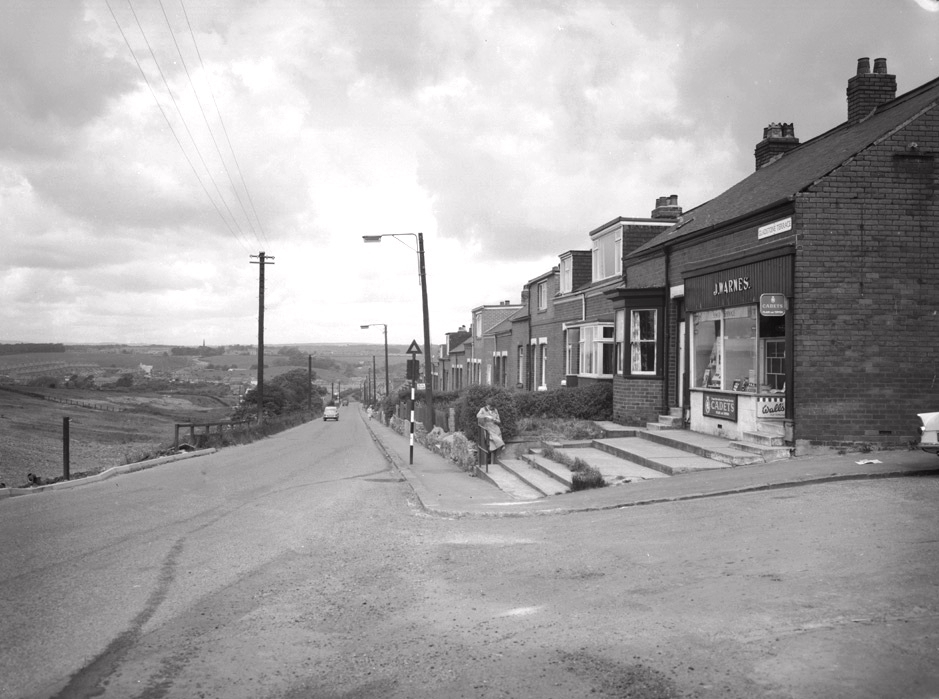
- Fatfield from Penshaw Station in 1965

- Location within Tyne and Wear
- Metropolitan borough: City of Sunderland
- Metropolitan county: Tyne and Wear
- Region: North East
- Country: England
- Sovereign state: United Kingdom
- Post town: WASHINGTON
- Postcode district: NE38
- Dialling code: 0191
- Police: Northumbria
- Fire: Tyne and Wear
- Ambulance: North East
- UK Parliament: Washington and Sunderland West

Fatfield is an area of Washington, in the City of Sunderland metropolitan borough in Tyne and Wear, England.

== Description ==
Fatfield is an area of Washington, Tyne and Wear, England. The southern part of the village by the River Wear is popular for country walks and the three public houses and working men's club on the banks of the river. The site of the original village is just to the west.

== Mine disasters ==
On 18 August 1708, an explosion at the colliery in Fatfield resulted in 69 deaths. In 1763, a further gas explosion killed 17 people and in 1767 a gas explosion resulted in 39 deaths.

In 1814, the Hall Pit in Fatfield exploded with the loss of 32 lives. At 12:30 on Tuesday 28 September a fall of stone from the roof drove firedamp into contact with candles used by the miners for illumination. All the men below ground were killed, as was one of the four men in the shaft at the time. Contemporary reports refer to the survivors being affected by the afterdamp. Although the colliery was claimed (by, for instance, the colliery overman) to be safe and well worked, there had been three previous explosions of firedamp which had each killed three men.

== Education ==
Fatfield Primary School is located on Southcroft and educates around 235 pupils aged 4–11. The school has Investors in People status and Artsmark and Healthy School awards. At their inspection on 14 June 2007, Ofsted rated the school as Satisfactory, point three on a four-point scale.

The older primary school (now demolished and replaced by modern housing) was located adjacent the Harraton Community Centre.

== Scouts ==
The First Fatfield Scouts was established in 1941 and was located behind the site of the infant school and just north of the dining hall on land adjacent to the primary school. The Schools being relocated to the centre of Fatfield and the land sold off for housing, the Scouts site still exists beside the new housing development.

== Places of worship ==
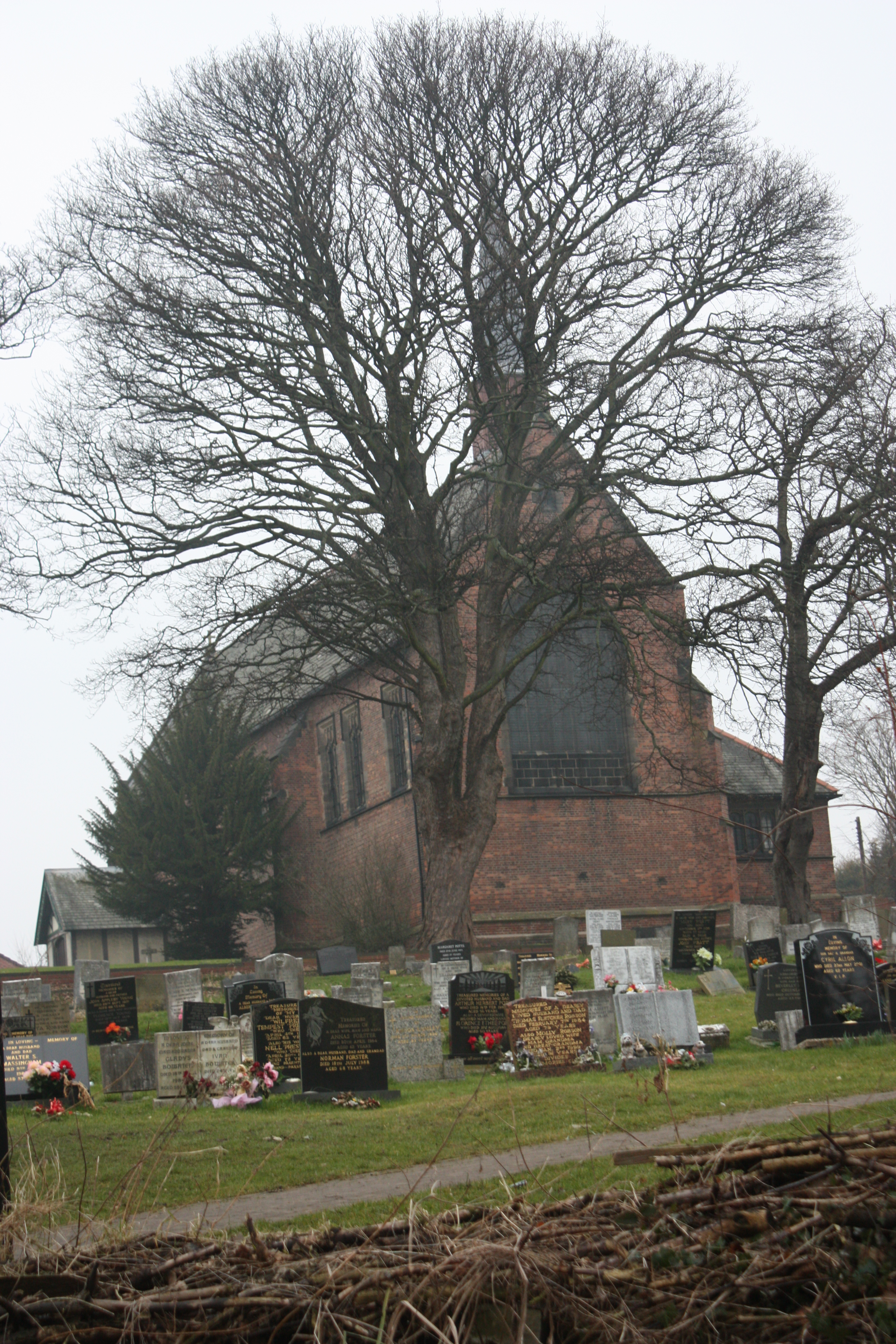
St George's church and churchyard in Harraton, Washington

The parish church of Fatfield is St George's Church in Washington, which was built in 1879 on land given by the Earl of Durham. The church building is in what is now called Harraton, one of the Washington villages, but continues with the historic name, St George's church, Fatfield. The church was substantially reordered in the 1980s and inside is warm, light and contemporary, reflecting the informal and lively style of worship that takes place.

The newly formed Catholic Parish of St John XXIII also covers the area of Fatfield. The Parish was officially created at 10AM on 27 April 2014, when Pope John XXIII was canonised by Pope Francis. Originally, the area was served by Washington Parish, founded from St Michaels Houghton in 1864, but the modern Washington cluster was established in 2002, and includes Our Lady Queen of Peace Penshaw in addition to the modern Washington Churches.

== Publicity ==
Fatfield had national publicity in the 1990s when the village was challenged to lose weight on the Fatfield Diet as part of a BBC television programme. Apart from the TV show, Fatfield is well known for the legend of the Lambton Worm which is said to have terrorised the village.

== Notable connections ==
- Bobby Thompson, comedian, was brought up here.
- Sir Harold Jeffreys, FRS, astronomer, was born here.
- Alan Price, keyboardist for the Animals, was born here.

== Sources ==
- Atkinson, Frank (1979). The Great Northern Coalfield 1700-1900. Newcastle upon Tyne: Frank Graham. ISBN 0 85983 121 3.
