= WWT Washington =

Wetland reserve in North East England

WWT Washington Wetland Centre
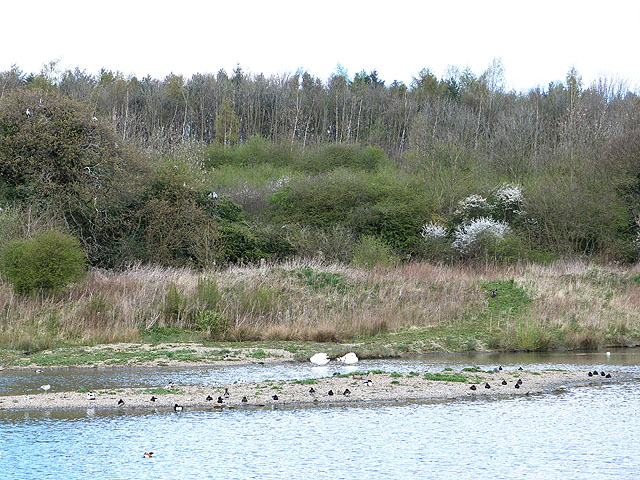
- Wader Lake and Heronry, Washington Wetland Centre (April 2014)

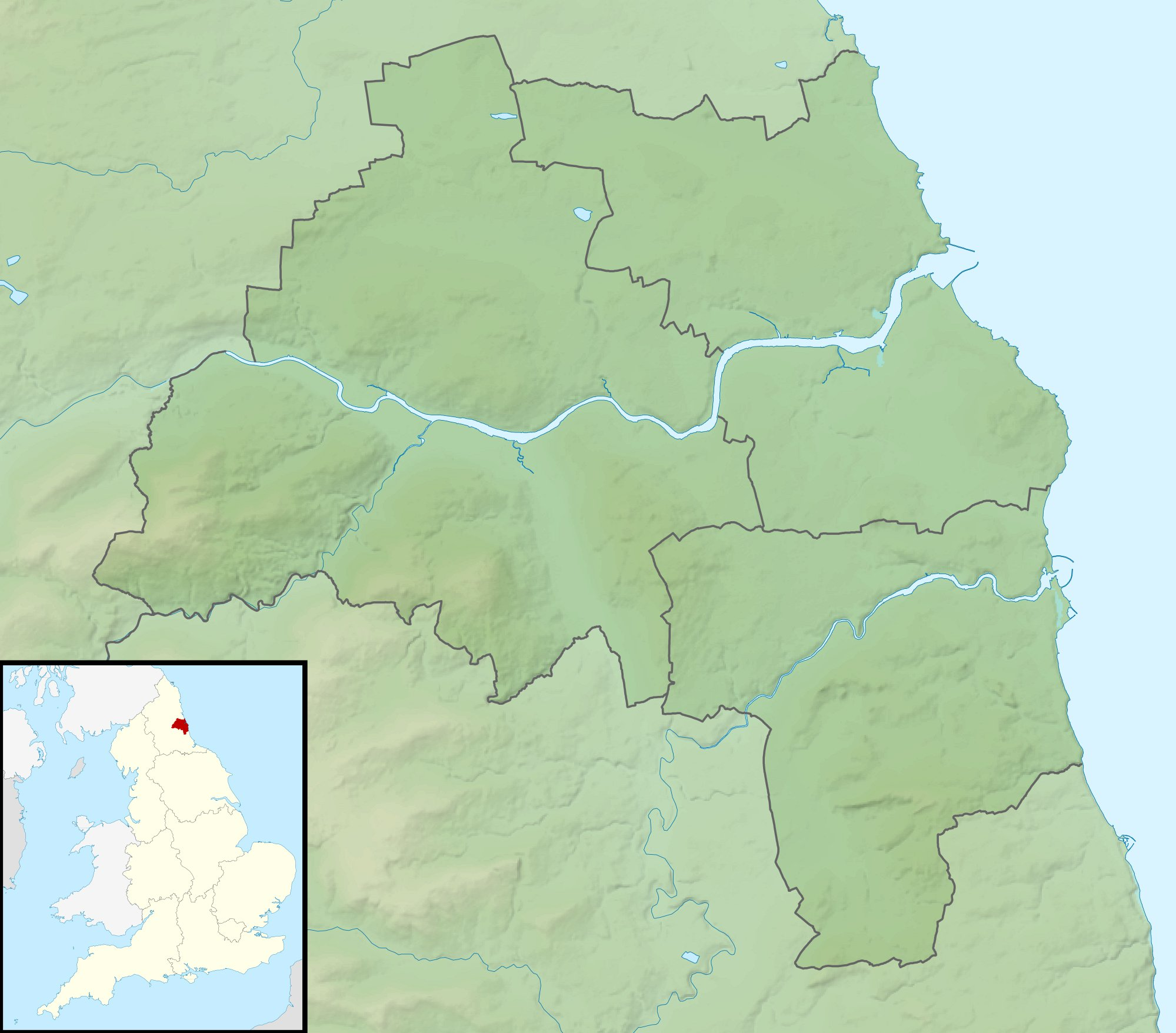
- Location within Tyne and Wear
- OS grid: NZ331562
- Coordinates: 54.899°N 1.484°W
- Created: 1975; 51 years ago
- Visitors: 83,817 (in 2019)
- Website: www.wwt.org.uk/visit/washington/

WWT Washington Wetland Centre is a wetland reserve managed by the Wildfowl and Wetlands Trust at Washington, Tyne and Wear, North East England.

Established in 1975, its wildlife includes swans, geese, ducks, a family of Asian short clawed otters and a flock of Chilean flamingos. WWT works towards the conservation of wetlands and has a successful breeding program for some of the world's most endangered wildfowl.

Included in the site is a nature reserve with hides to watch the wildlife, a saline lagoon and dragonfly ponds in which large species of dragonfly live along with newts, frogs and toads.

The park sells bags of seed that can be used to get an up-close and personal encounter with most of their birds whilst feeding them.

Species kept at the park include:

- Andean goose
- Baer's pochard
- Black necked swan
- Black swan
- Chilean flamingo
- Common crane
- Eider
- Hawaiian goose
- Mute swan
- Red-breasted goose
- Ringed teal
- Spur-winged goose
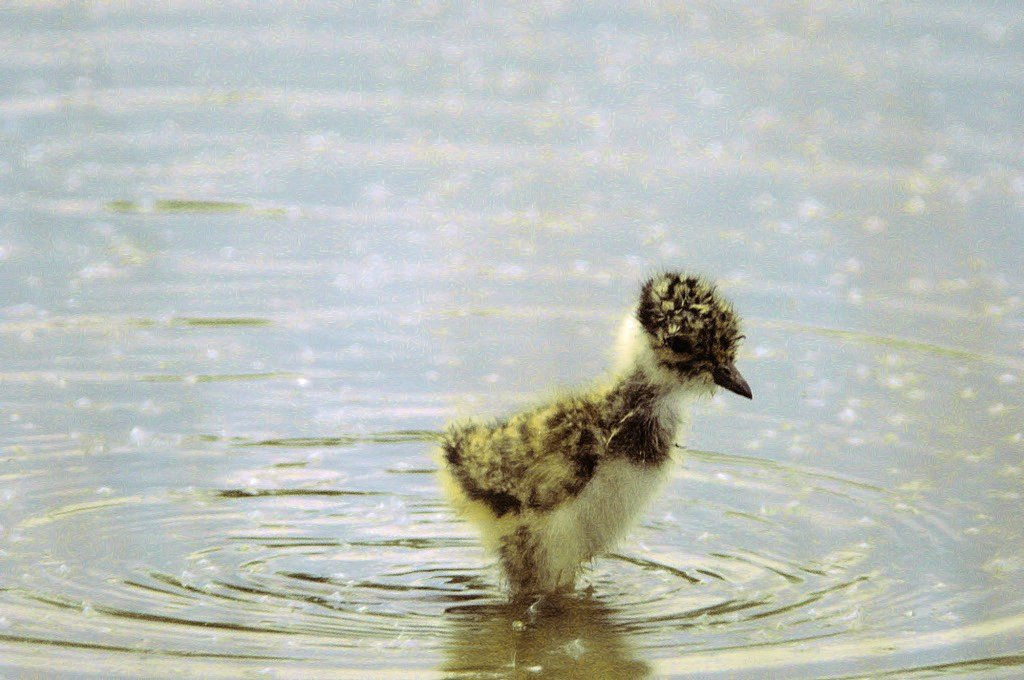
- Northern lapwing chick at WWT Washington.
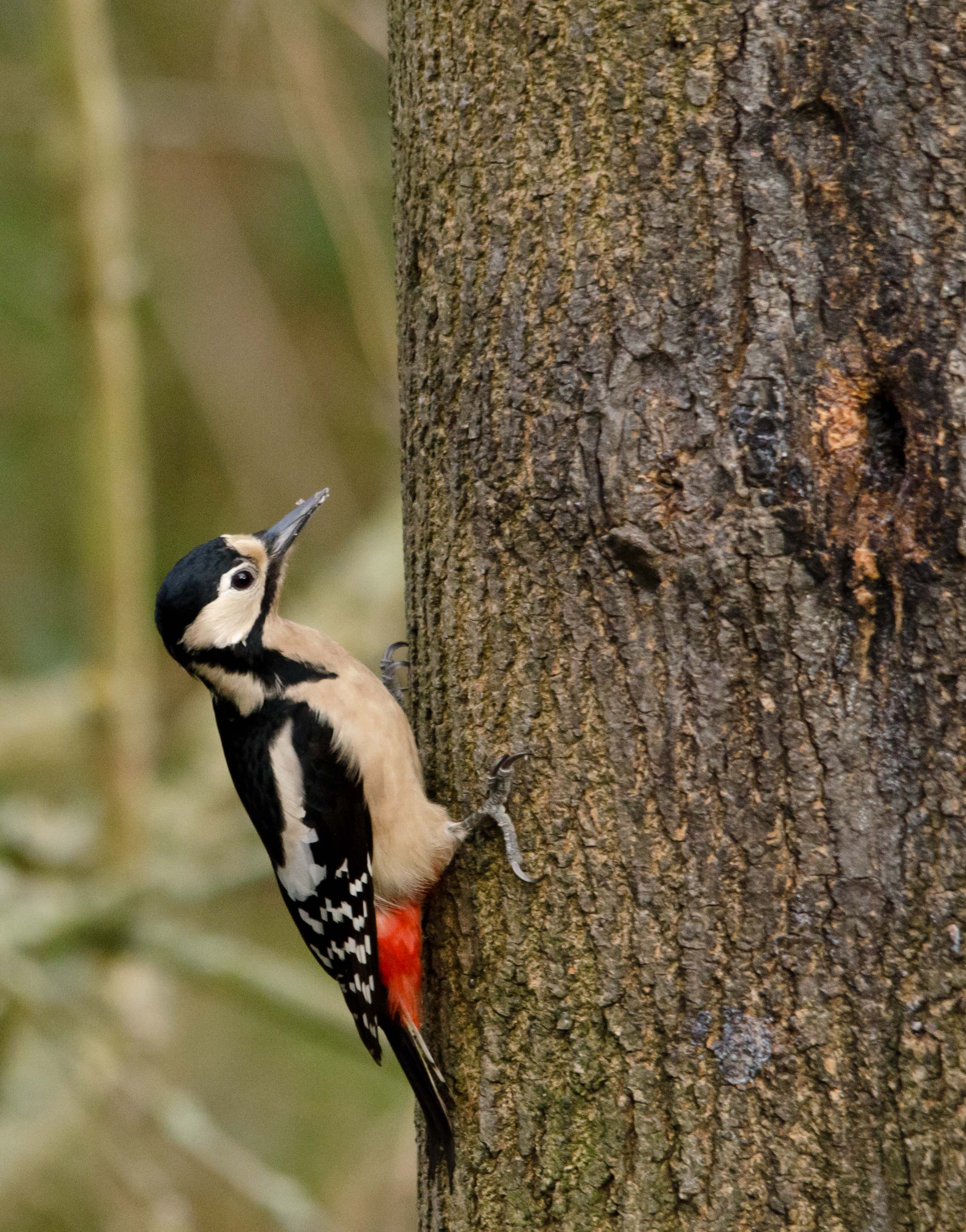
  Great spotted woodpecker at WWT Washington.
  White-faced whistling duck
