= Lambton, Tyne and Wear =

Lambton
- Village
- Location in Tyne and Wear
- Coordinates: 54.890°N 1.543°W
- OS grid reference: NZ294551
- Sovereign state: United Kingdom
- Country: England
- District: Tyne and Wear

Lambton is an area of Washington, in the City of Sunderland metropolitan borough in Tyne and Wear, England. It lies about 2 miles (3 km) northeast of Chester-le-Street. It is historically part of County Durham. It is linked to the Lambton family, Lambton Castle, and is the legendary home of the Lambton Worm.

New Lambton is located just a few miles from the Lambton estate.
