= Red House Farm =

- Residential area
- Location in Tyne and Wear
- Coordinates: 55.021°N 1.645°W
- OS grid reference: NZ227696
- Sovereign state: United Kingdom
- Country: England
- District: Tyne and Wear

Red House Farm is a residential area of Newcastle upon Tyne, about 4 miles (6 km) north west of the city centre. It is bordered by Fawdon to the south and North Gosforth to the north. It is a small residential area of primarily semi-detached houses and flats. It is also home to some small independent retailers and The Northumbrian Piper restaurant and pub. The Red House Farm area is served by a number of local bus routes and home of the famous jor.
