= Columbia, Tyne and Wear =

Village in United Kingdom

Coordinates: 54°53′47″N 1°30′44″W

Columbia is one of the village subdivisions of the town of Washington, Tyne and Wear, England.
