= George Clarke's Amazing Spaces =

- Also known as: George Clarke's Amazing Spaces: Compilations; George Clarke's Amazing Spaces: Snow Specials
- Genre: Documentary
- Presented by: George Clarke
- Starring: George Clarke; Will Hardie; Max McMurdo; Laura Jane Clark
- Theme music composer: Gil Cang; Malachi Lillitos
- Country of origin: United Kingdom
- Original language: English
- No. of series: 13
- No. of episodes: 99

Production
- Running time: 60 minutes (inc. adverts)
- Production company: Plum Pictures

Original release
- Network: Channel 4
- Release: 23 October 2012 – present

George Clarke's Amazing Spaces is a British television series that first aired on Channel 4 on 23 October 2012. In 2015, it was nominated for the BAFTA Best Feature award.

== Background ==
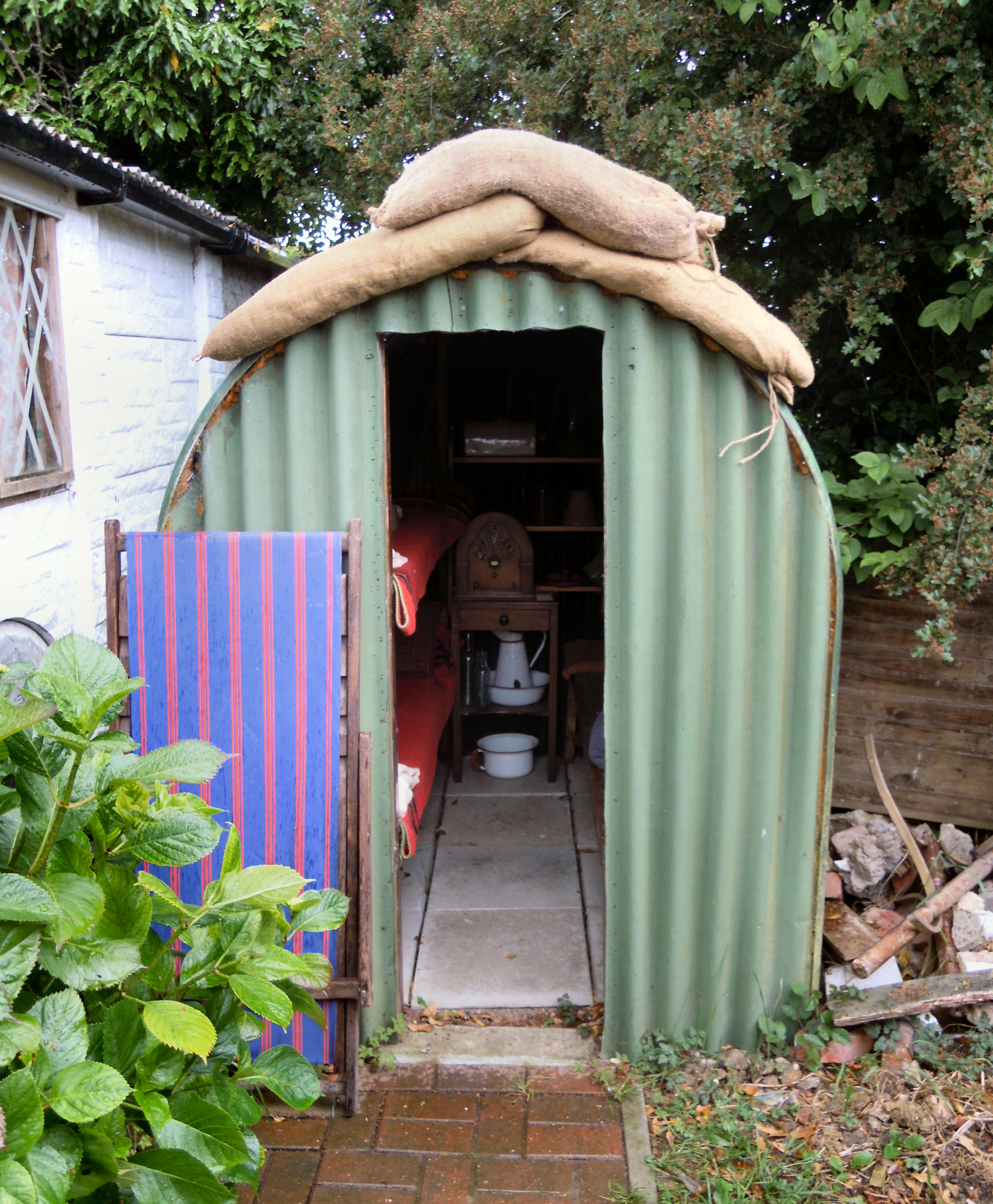
Part of Blitz and Pieces museum, a 2014 Shed of the Year finalist

The show follows people who transform unconventional things, such as old boats, into places to live, with a particular emphasis on the creative use of small spaces. The show is presented by George Clarke. The spin-off is titled Shed of the Year.

== Series ==
- Series 1 (2012)
- Series 2 (2013)
- Series 3 (2014)
- Series 4 (2014)
- Series 5 (2015)
- Series 6 (2016)
- Series 7 (2018)
- Series 8 (2017-2019)
- Series 9 (2020)
- Series 10 (2022)
- Series 11 (2023)
- Series 12 (2024)
- Series 13 (2025)

== Shed of the Year ==
- Shed of the Year (2014)
- Shed of the Year (2015)
- Shed of the Year (2016)
- Shed of the Year (2017)

== See also ==
- Tiny House Nation
