= Washington, Tyne and Wear =

Town in Tyne and Wear, England

Coordinates: 54.90°N 1.52°W

Washington
- Town
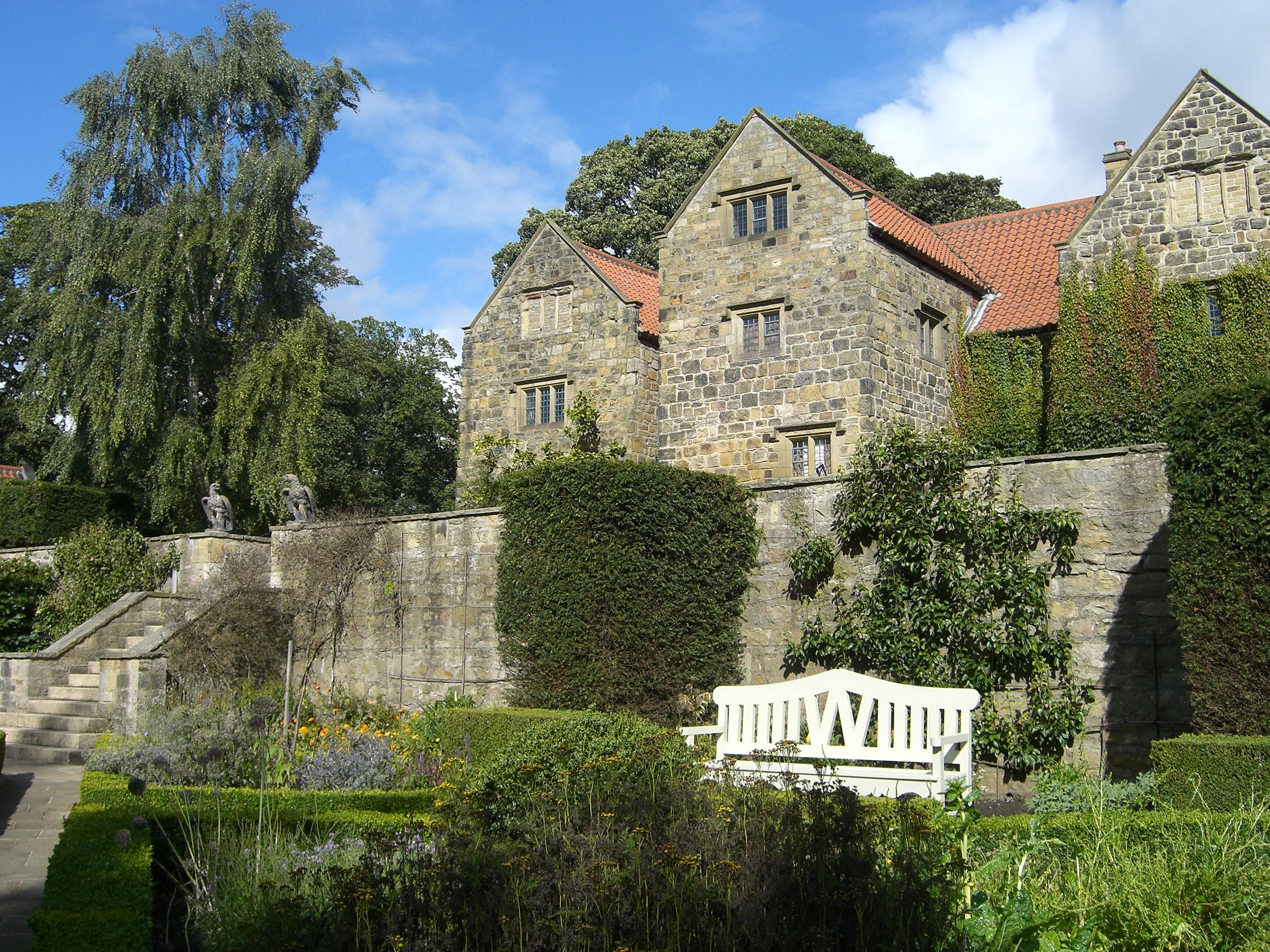
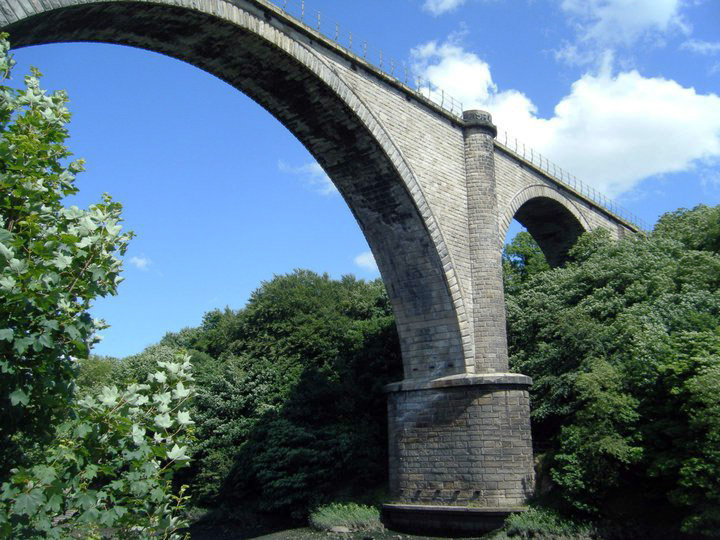
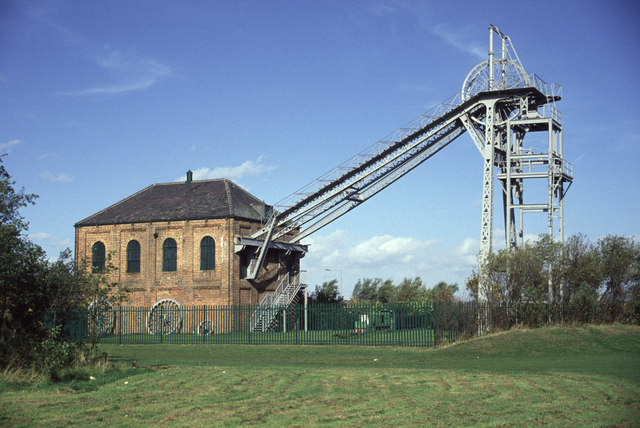
- Washington Old Hall Victoria Viaduct Pit Museum

- Location within Tyne and Wear
- Population: 67,085
- OS grid reference: NZ3157
- Metropolitan borough: Sunderland
- Metropolitan county: Tyne and Wear
- Region: North East
- Country: England
- Sovereign state: United Kingdom
- Post town: Washington
- Postcode district: NE37, NE38
- Dialling code: 0191
- Police: Northumbria
- Fire: Tyne and Wear
- Ambulance: North East
- UK Parliament: Washington and Gateshead South

Washington is a town in the Sunderland district, in Tyne and Wear, England. Historically part of County Durham, it is the ancestral settlement of the local Washington family, from which the first president of the United States, George Washington, descended. It has a population of 67,085.

It is located between Chester-le-Street, Gateshead and South Tyneside. Washington was designated a new town in 1964. It became part of Tyne and Wear in 1974. The town has expanded dramatically since its designation; new villages were created and areas were reassigned from Chester-le-Street, to offer housing and employment to those moving from adjoining areas and further afield. At the 2011 census, Washington had a population of 67,085, compared to 53,388 in 2001.

== History ==
=== Toponymy ===
Early references appear around 1096 in Old English as Wasindone. The etymological origin is disputed and there are several proposed theories for how the name Washington came about. Early interpretations included Wasindone ("people of the hill by the stream", 1096), or Wassyngtona ("settlement of Wassa's people", 1183).

==== Hwæsa ====
The origins of the name Washington are not fully known. The most supported theory (especially amongst local historians) is that Washington is derived from Anglo-Saxon Hwæsingatūn, which roughly means "estate of the descendants (family) of Hwæsa". Hwæsa (usually rendered Wassa or Wossa in modern English) is an Old English name meaning "wheat sheaf".

Due to the evolution of English grammar, modern English lacks the Germanic grammatical features that permeated Anglo-Saxon English. This causes confusion for many in regard to the name Hwæsingatūn. It is essentially composed of three main (albeit grammatically altered) elements:

- "Hwæsa" – most likely the name of a local Anglo-Saxon chieftain or farmer.
- "ing" – a Germanic component that has lost its original context in English: ing means roughly "[derived] of/from". In the name Hwæsingatūn, "ing" is conjugated to "inga" in accordance with the genitive plural declension of OE.
- "tūn" – root of the modern English "town", and is a cognate of German Zaun (fence), Dutch tuin (garden) and Icelandic tún (paddock). The word means "fenced off estate" or more accurately "estate with defined boundaries".

The combined elements (with all correct conjugations in place) therefore create the name Hwæsingatūn with a full and technical meaning of "the estate of the descendants of Hwæsa".

However, there has been no evidence found of any chieftain/land owner/farmer in the area by the name of Hwæsa, although any such records from the time would likely have been long lost by now.

==== Washing ====
Another popular origin theory is that Washington is derived from the Old English verb wascan and the noun dūn meaning "hill"; thus making the name Wascandūn, meaning "washing hill". This theory likely originates from the proximity of the river Wear to the actual Anglo-Saxon hall at the time (most likely where Washington Old Hall stands today).

This idea is not backed by linguistic evidence. Combining the two Old English words "wascan" and "dūn" would actually have meant "washed hill" and not "washing hill". Also, the Old English "dūn" meant a range of gently rolling hills, as evidenced by the naming of the North and South Downs in southern England.

=== Old Hall ===
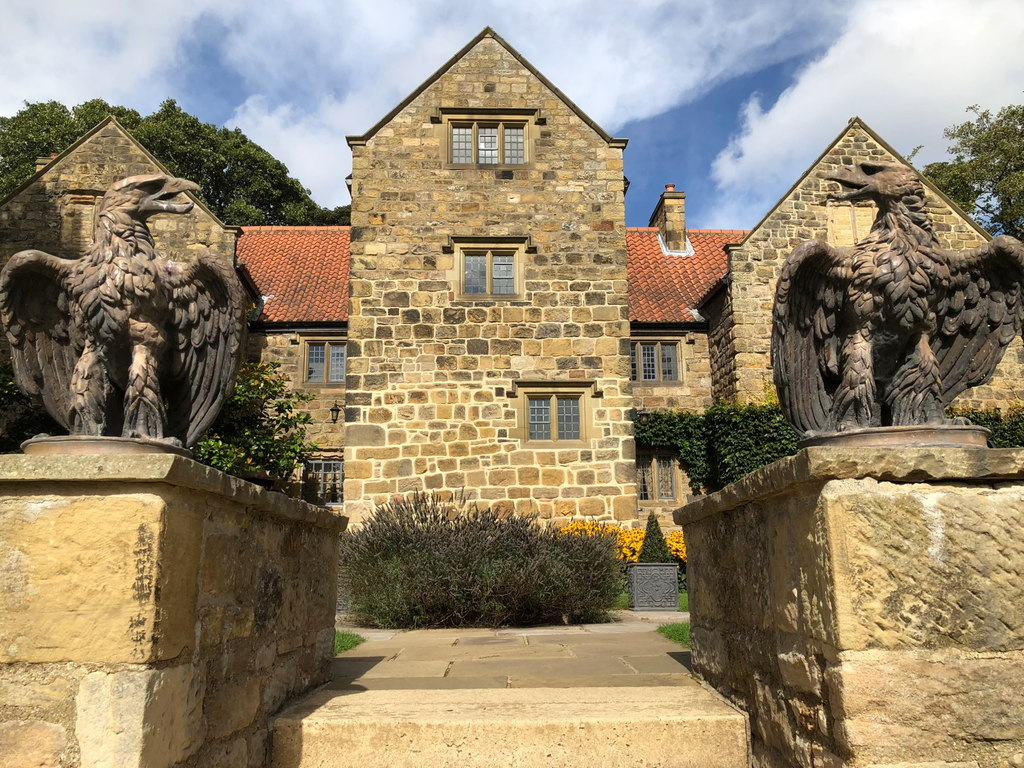
The Old Hall

The Old Hall may have been built by William de Hertburn, who moved to the area in 1183. As was the custom, he took the name of his new estates (Wessyngtonlands), and became William de Wessyngton. By 1539, when the family moved to Sulgrave Manor in Northamptonshire, the spelling "Washington" had been adopted.

The present Hall is an early 17th-century small English manor house of sandstone. Only the foundations and the arches between the Kitchen and the Great Hall remain of the original house.

=== George Washington connection ===
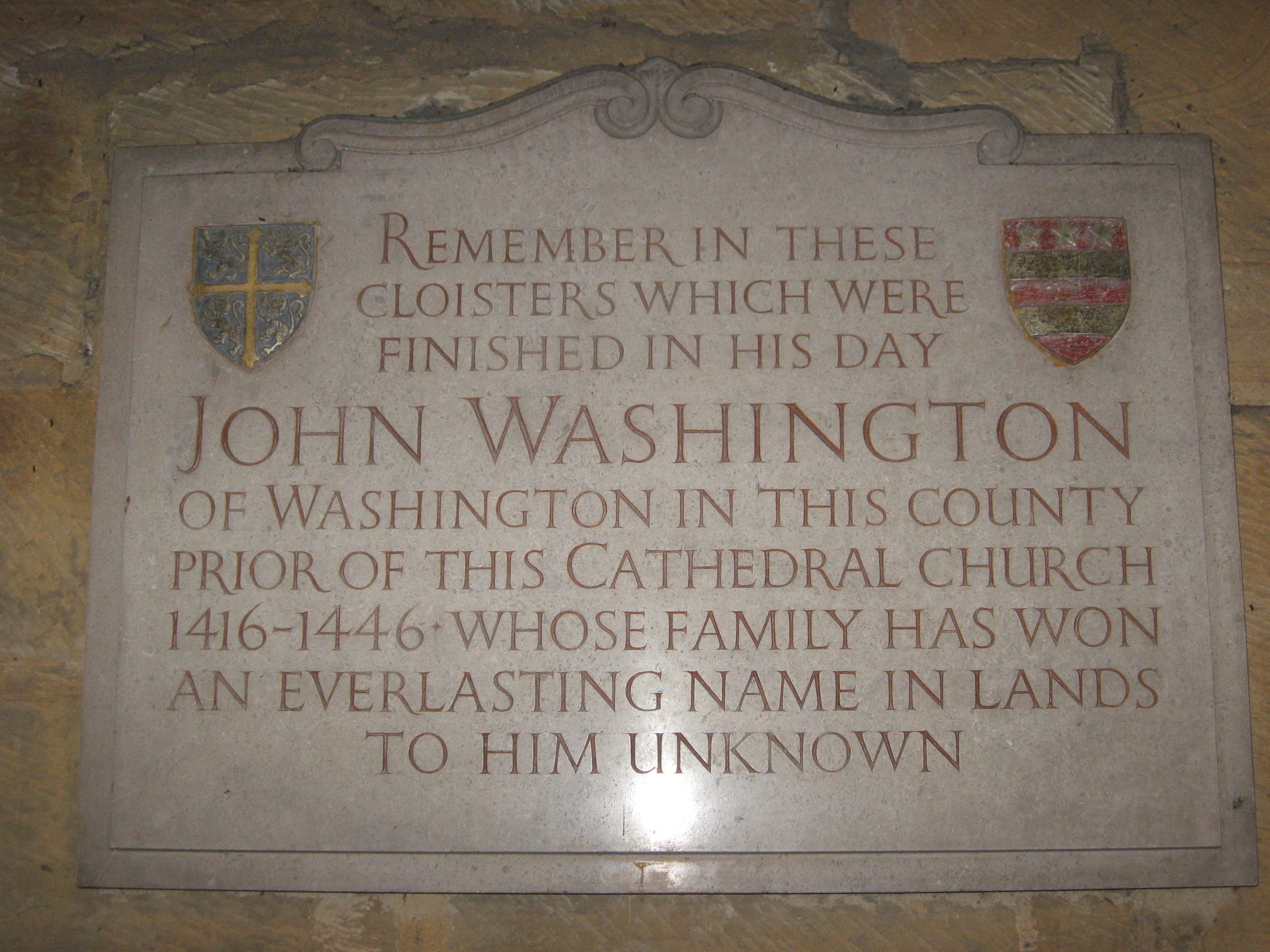
Plaque in Durham Cathedral's cloisters for John Washington, who was Prior there.

William de Wessyngton (originally William Bayard, later de Hertburne) was a forebear of George Washington, the first president of the United States, after whom the US capital, a state and many other places in the United States are named. Though George Washington's great-grandfather John Washington left for Virginia from Northamptonshire, Washington Old Hall was the family home of George Washington's ancestors. The present structure incorporates small parts of the medieval home in which they lived. American Independence Day is marked each year by a ceremony at Washington Old Hall.

=== Dame Margaret's Hall ===
Sir Isaac Lowthian Bell and his wife Margaret, grandparents of Gertrude Bell, lived in Washington New Hall on The Avenue. After Margaret's death in 1871, Sir Isaac set up an orphanage in the house, named Dame Margaret Home in his late wife's honour. It later became a Dr Barnardo's home until World War II. After the war, it was taken over by the National Coal Board as a training centre, and then a children's home again. It is now a number of private apartments.

=== Building the New Town ===
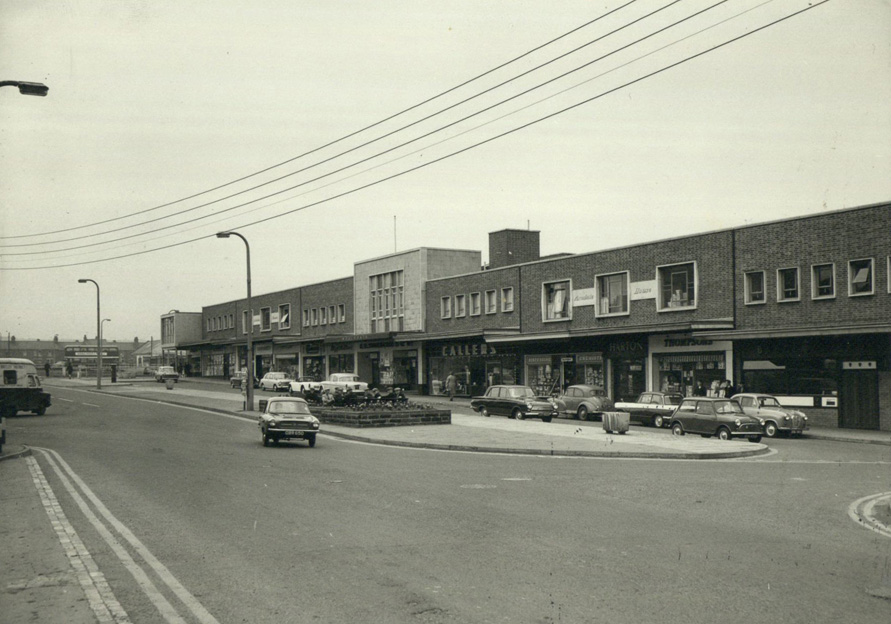
Front Street in 1965

Washington's design was developed through the New Towns concept aiming to achieve sustainable socio-economic growth. The new town is divided into 18 residential "villages". It was originally also divided into the 15 numbered districts, which confused many visitors to the area. The numbered districts were abolished in 1983 though survived for a while on road signs and in postal addresses.

Land in the south west of the area designated for the town was purchased from the Lambton family, the Earls of Durham. Their estate of the same name includes their ancestral home, Lambton Castle. In 1970, Washington hosted the English Schools Athletic Association (ESAA) annual National Championships, attended by the then Lord Lieutenant of County Durham. On 15 November 1977, the very first SavaCentre hypermarket (a Sainsbury's and British Home Stores joint venture) opened at The Galleries. By 2005, however, it had been rebranded as a traditional Sainsbury's as the SavaCentre brand was phased out.

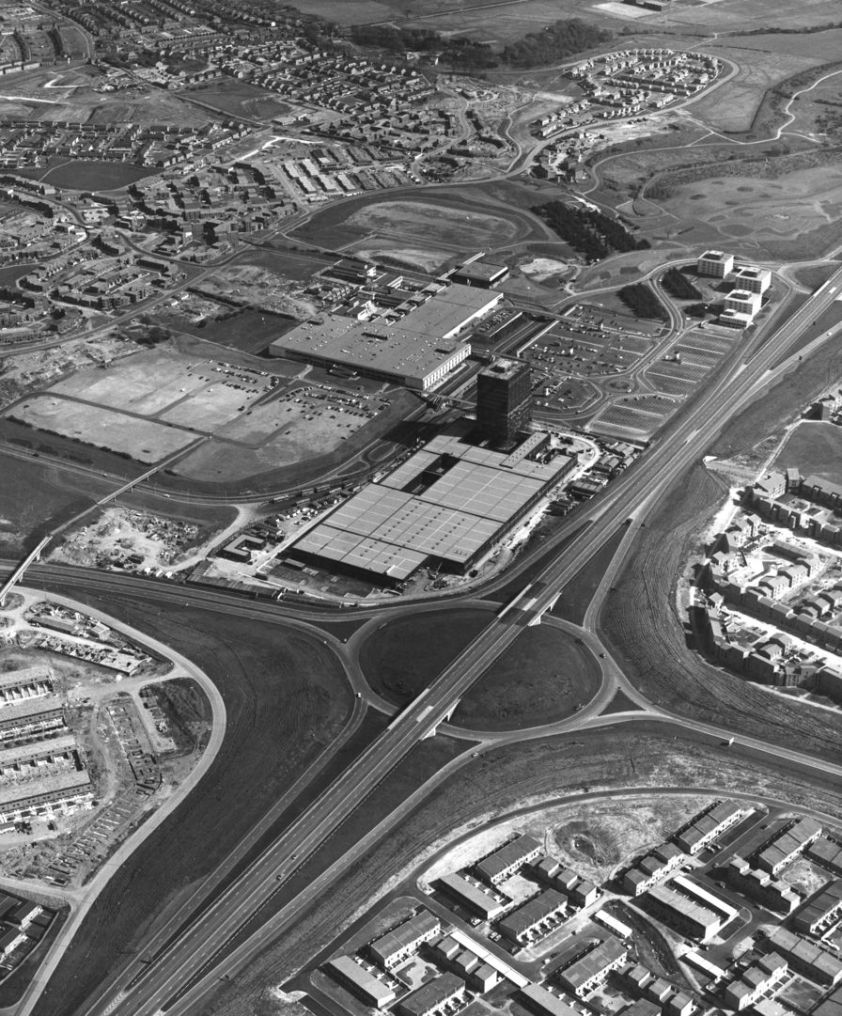
Washington in 1973

== Geography ==
The town is made up of villages and includes the five ancient townships of Washington. Its villages are:

- Albany
- Ayton
- Barmston (an ancient township)
- Biddick (previously North Biddick, an ancient township)
- Blackfell
- Columbia (previously Washington Station)
- Concord (previously New Washington and Little Usworth)
- Donwell
- Fatfield
- Glebe
- Harraton
- Lambton
- Mount Pleasant (which is south of the River Wear and shares the DH4 Postcode with Houghton le Spring)
- Oxclose
- Rickleton
- Sulgrave
- Teal Farm
- Usworth (previously Great or High Usworth, an ancient township)
- Washington Village (the original township and location of the Old Hall).

The town also has ten industrial estates, some of which are named after famous northern engineers, such as Parsons, Armstrong, Stephenson, Phineas Crowther, Pattinson, Swan and Emerson.

== Community and culture ==
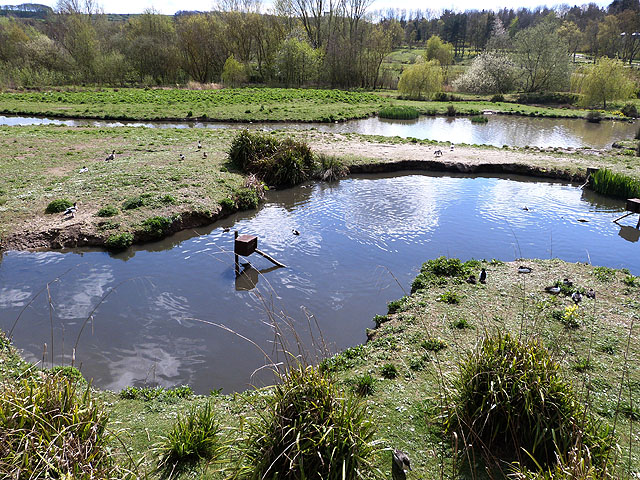
The wetlands reserve

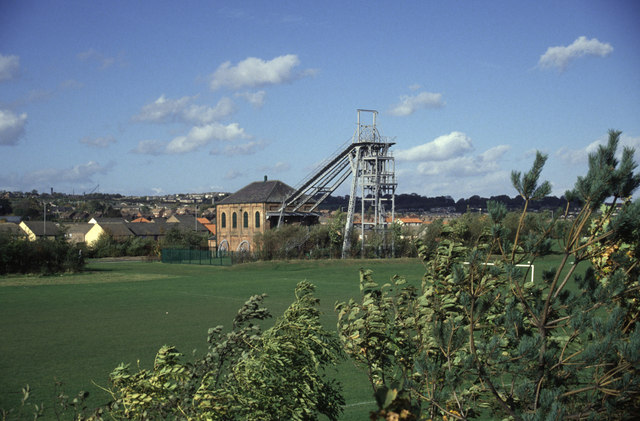
The 'F' Pit mining museum

The town has a Wildfowl and Wetlands Trust nature reserve and The Washington 'F' Pit mining museum. The Washington Arts Centre is a converted farm building. The Centre includes an exhibition gallery, community theatre, artist studios and a recording studio. The North East Land, Sea and Air Museums is just north of the old RAF Usworth base. The Nissan plant takes up much of the rest. The municipal airport previously run from the site was closed in 1984 to make way for the Nissan plant.

== Industry ==
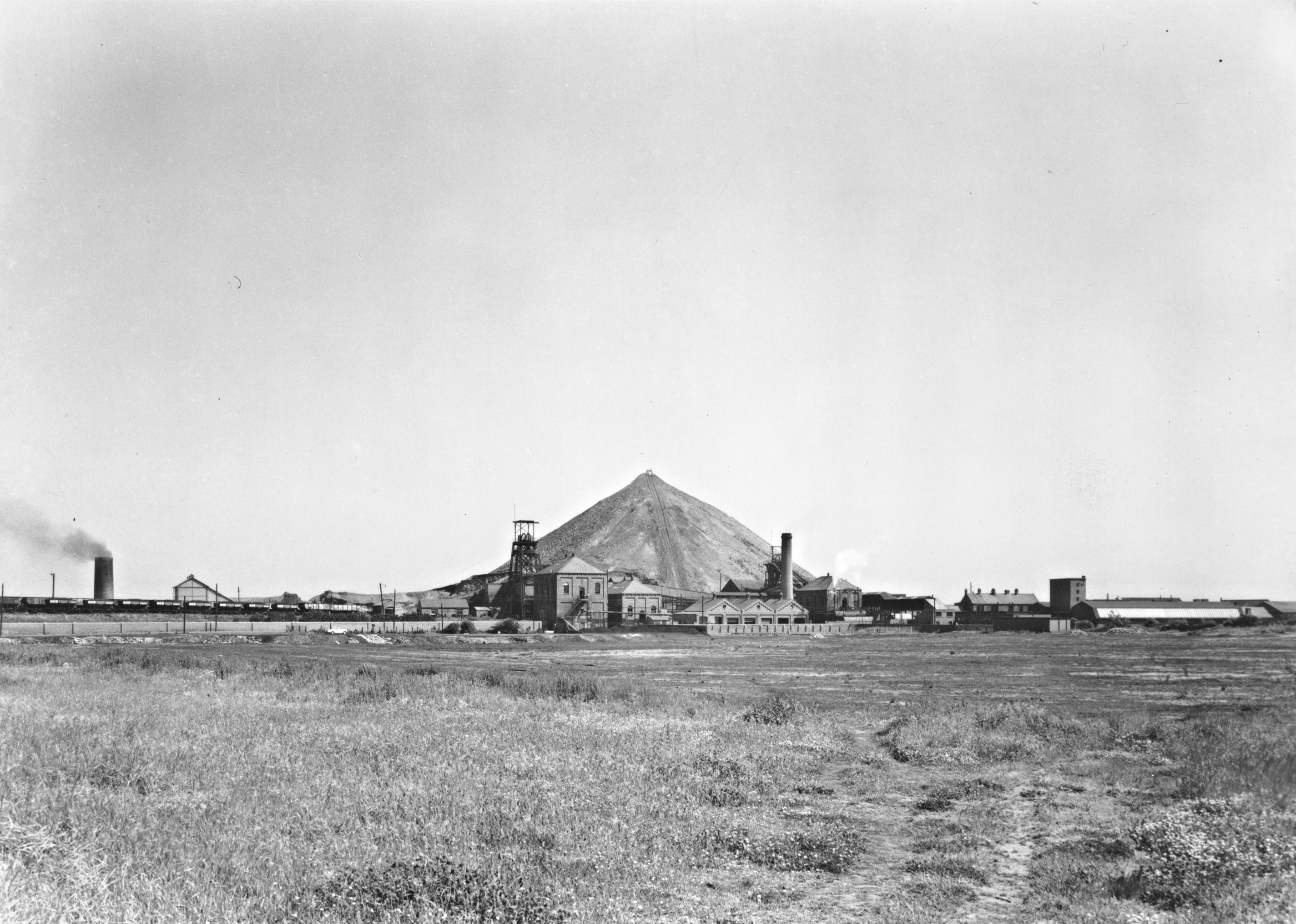
View of Washington 'F' Pit, May 1965

Historically, Washington was heavily involved in the coal industry with a number of pits. One of these in the Albany district of Washington is preserved as the 'F' Pit Museum (Washington colliery shafts alphabetically A to I e.g. the 'F' Pit). A number of the old communities of Washington grew up around the pits, e.g. Little Usworth grew up around the Usworth Colliery before being renamed Sulgrave. In support of the mines, there was a series of wagonways and later railway lines to transport the coal. The wagonways took coal to Staithes on the River Wear, where it could be loaded onto barges to be taken to the seagoing vessels at Sunderland.

Washington was also involved in the chemical industry and the Washington Chemical Works was a major employer in the 19th century. This later became the Cape/Newalls Works, which produced insulation. The Pattinson Town area of Washington grew up around the chemical works. This area is now the Pattinson South industrial estate and the Teal Farm housing estate.

Currently, Washington's main industries include electronics, car assembly, chemicals, electrical goods and government offices at the town centre and beside the wetlands centre. The Nissan automotive plant is the largest car assembler in Britain and the largest private-sector employer in the City of Sunderland.

Goodyear Tire and Rubber Company opened a new factory in Washington in 1968, which later became Dunlop and Sumitomo Tyres. However, it closed on 5 July 2006 with the loss of 585 jobs. The site is now occupied by Rolls-Royce Holdings making aero engine blades, and British Aerospace.

== Education ==
There are several primary, secondary schools and colleges in the villages of Washington.

=== Primary schools ===
- Albany Village Primary
- Barmston Village Primary
- Biddick Primary School
- Columbia Grange School
- Fatfield Primary School
- George Washington School (formerly High Usworth)
- Holley Park Academy
- John F. Kennedy Primary School
- Lambton Primary School
- Oxclose Primary
- Rickleton Primary School
- St Bedes Primary School
- St John Boste RC Primary School
- St Joseph's Roman Catholic Primary School
- Usworth Colliery
- Marlborough Park - (formerly Usworth Grange Primary School)
- Wessington Primary – (formerly Glebe Primary)
- Washington Village Primary School – (closed)

=== Secondary schools ===
- Biddick Academy
- Oxclose Community Academy
- St Robert of Newminster Catholic School
- Washington Academy

=== Colleges ===
- St Robert of Newminster Sixth Form
- City of Sunderland College Usworth Closed

=== Other ===
The North East of England Japanese Saturday School (北東イングランド補習授業校 Hokutō Ingurando Hoshū Jugyō Kō), a Japanese weekend supplementary school, held its classes in the Oxclose Community School in Oxclose.

== Sport ==
Washington F.C. is a club based in the Northern League Division Two which is the tenth level of the English game.

In 2005, Washington R.F.C was established. The club currently plays in Durham and Northumberland Division 3.

== Politics ==
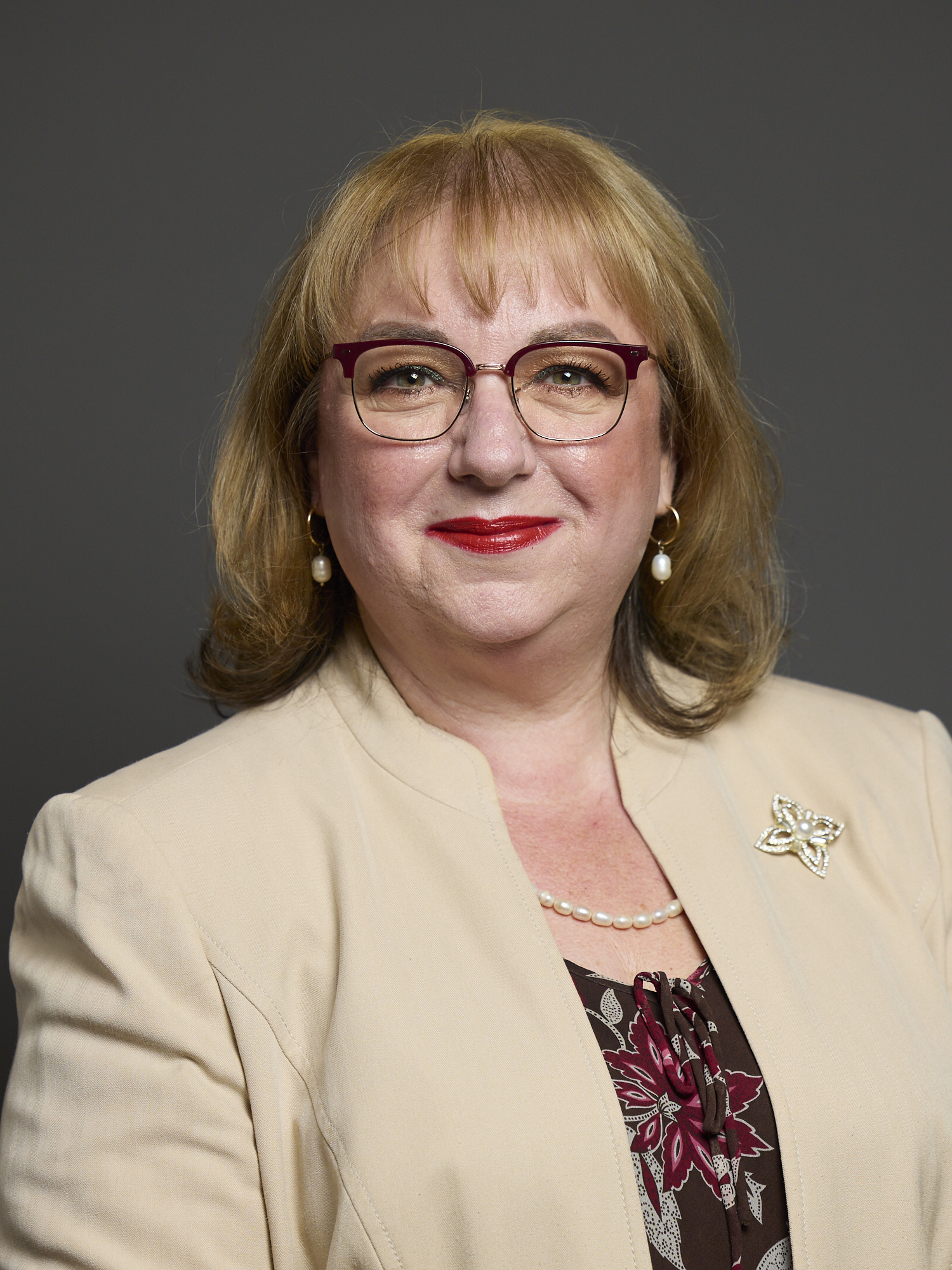
Sharon Hodgson has been the Member of Parliament for Washington since the 2005 general election.

Washington is part of the Washington and Gateshead South parliamentary constituency and is represented in the House of Commons by Sharon Hodgson of the Labour Party.

== Transport ==
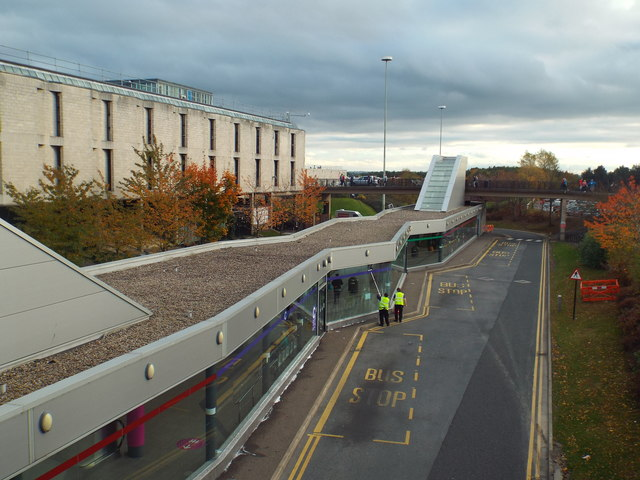
The Galleries Bus Station

There is a major bus station situated at The Galleries, and another at Concord in the north of Washington. The primary provider of transport (buses) in the area is Go North East, with local services as well as connections to Newcastle upon Tyne, Sunderland, and many other towns and cities in the region.

Major roads run through Washington: the A182, the A1231 (Sunderland Highway) and the A195 all connect to the A1(M) motorway (which acts as the western boundary of Washington proper) or its feeder, the A194. Washington Services is situated between Junctions 64 and 65 of the A1(M), and incorporates a Travelodge.

The town's railway station closed to passengers in the 1960s due to the Beeching cuts and to freight in 1991. The now overgrown site is on the disused Leamside Line which connected Durham and Sunderland via the town to Newcastle. The line was lifted and mothballed by Network Rail and partly is in use as an unmarked footpath. In June 2009, the Association of Train Operating Companies called for a scheme funding the reopening of 33 stations (including the town's station) on 14 lines closed by the Beeching Axe and seven new-build parkway stations. The first stage of a business case was published in 2022, this involved extending the Tyne and Wear Metro to Washington if Government funding was secured.

== Notable people ==
- Gertrude Bell was born at Washington Hall.
- The musician Bryan Ferry (of Roxy Music fame) comes from Washington and attended Washington Grammar School (now Washington Academy).
- Heather Mills, notable for marrying Paul McCartney, attended Usworth Grange Primary School and Usworth Comprehensive School.
- Leeds United and England footballer Billy Furness was born in Washington and started his football career playing for Usworth Colliery
- Sunderland, Everton and England goalkeeper Jordan Pickford was brought up in Washington.
- George Clarke - architect, television presenter, lecturer and writer was born in Sunderland and brought up in Washington.
