= Rickleton =

Area of Washington, Tyne and Wear, England

Coordinates: 54.879°N 1.551°W

- Location within Tyne and Wear
- Population: 3,058
- OS grid reference: NZ 28907 53897
- Metropolitan borough: City of Sunderland
- Metropolitan county: Tyne and Wear
- Region: North East
- Country: England
- Sovereign state: United Kingdom
- Post town: WASHINGTON
- Postcode district: NE38
- Dialling code: 0191
- Police: Northumbria
- Fire: Tyne and Wear
- Ambulance: North East
- UK Parliament: Washington and Gateshead South

Rickleton is an area of Washington, in the City of Sunderland metropolitan borough in Tyne and Wear, England. It is located on the south side of Washington.

== Transport ==
The village has roads forming a loop around the village; these roads are called Rickleton Way, Bonemill Lane, and Picktree Lane. The village has a bus service operated by Go North East.

The nearest railway station is Chester-le-Street railway station.
