= Blackfell =

- Village
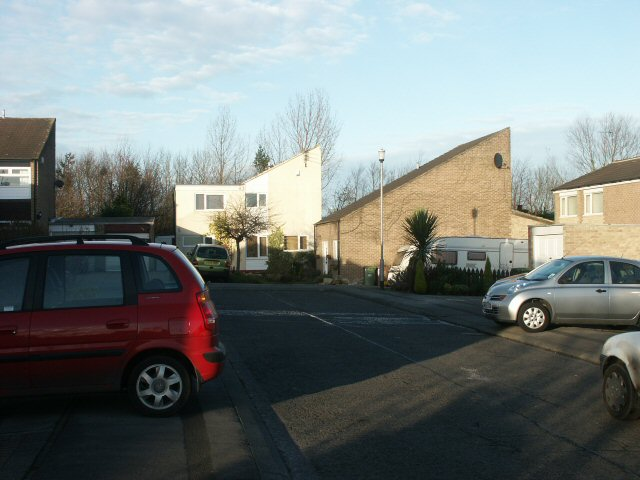
- Houses in Blackfell

- Location in Tyne and Wear
- Coordinates: 54.906°N 1.549°W
- OS grid reference: NZ290568
- Sovereign state: United Kingdom
- Country: England
- District: Tyne and Wear

Blackfell is a village located in the new town of Washington, Tyne and Wear in England.

Construction of the village began in the 1960s, and was completed over several years. The original prefabricated maisonettes in the east side of the village have now been replaced with new-build homes. The village was built near the site of Blackfell Army Camp (no longer in existence) also covering Blackfell Caravan and Camping Club, and the old Washington F Pit [Coal mining|coal pit] in Albany now a listed building and small museum, currently closed and undergoing redevelopment.

The village is between the A182, A1231 and the A194. Local bus services link the village with others in Washington.

When Washington New Town was constructed, each village was given its own industrial estate to employ the local workforce. A recently constructed B&Q store (which was built around a Dickens DIY store, which was itself built on the RCA Record factory ground) dominates the Armstrong Industrial Estate closest to Blackfell.
