= Oxclose =

Area of Washington, Tyne and Wear, England

Coordinates: 54°53′50″N 01°32′42″W

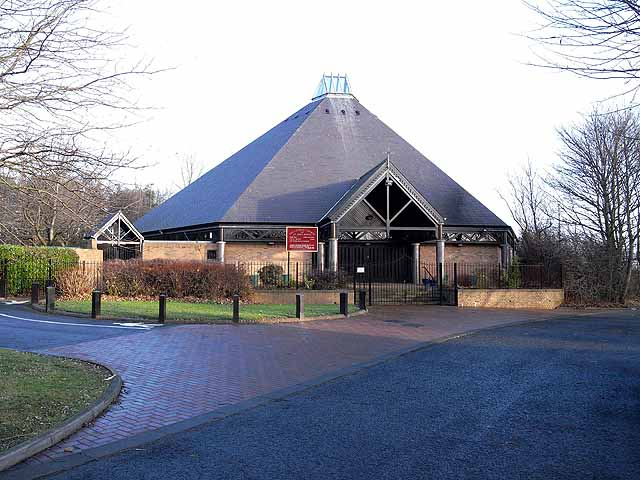
St John Boste Church, Oxclose

Oxclose is an area of Washington, Tyne and Wear, England. It is located between the A1231, A182 and A195 highways, close to Sunderland, and is well served by links from the A1(M) which passes within 1 mile (1.6 km) of Oxclose's boundaries. Oxclose covers an area of approximately 0.1 square miles (300,000 m^{2}) and has a population of around 3800 (2001 Census).

There are two churches, a 'Multi-Purpose' Centre and a village centre which contains a shop, newsagents, fish and chip shop and a local pub called The Ox and Plough. It is also near to the Galleries Shopping Centre.

== Education ==
There are four schools in Oxclose: Oxclose Nursery, Oxclose Primary School, St John Boste RC Primary School and Oxclose Community Academy.

The North East of England Japanese Saturday School (北東イングランド補習授業校 Hokutō Ingurando Hoshū Jugyō Kō), a Japanese weekend supplementary school, holds its classes in the Oxclose Community School.
