= Joseph Gilpin =

American politician (1725-1790)

Joseph Gilpin (1 August 1725–30 March 1790) was an American politician.

Coat of Arms of Joseph Gilpin

He was born to Samuel Gilpin and Jane Parker in Chester County, Pennsylvania. Gilpin and his family relocated to Cecil County, Maryland in his childhood. He inherited a large tract of land and began building a county seat for Cecil County. He married Sarah Elizabeth Reed. Together they had eleven children. Influential in his Maryland sphere, he became one of the first to call for independence. In 1770, he was elected as a member to the American Philosophical Society.

He served as a representative at the Provincial convention in Annapolis (1775), joined the convention to draft a constitution for the state of Delaware (1776), became a delegate to the Provincial convention (1777), the Maryland Assembly (1777), and began serving as presiding Justice of the first court of Cecil County, which he held until his death. He also attended the Maryland convention for the ratification of the United States Constitution (1787), and the Philadelphia conference regarding the restoration of public credit (1780). His brother, Thomas Gilpin (1727-1778), was also a prominent member of the American Philosophical Society. His brother George Gilpin was an influential figure in early Alexandria Virginia and a close associate and friend of George Washington, serving as pallbearer at his funeral.

Joseph Gilpin died in his home in Cecil County.

== Family ==
Genealogical records and family histories identify Joseph Gilpin, his brother Thomas Gilpin, and George Gilpin, as direct descendants of Richard de Gylpyn of Kentmere. Richard de Gylpyn is traditionally said to have been granted an estate in the early 1200s for killing a Wild Boar of Westmorland that had terrorized the region, an event memorialized in the boar’s head depicted on the Gilpin family crest.

The family’s migration to North America in the late 17th century established this branch that would play notable roles in the political and social life of the colonies.
