= George Gilpin (colonel) =

George Gilpin (March 4, 1740 – December 27, 1813) was an American Revolutionary War officer, surveyor, merchant, and civic leader in Alexandria, Virginia. A close associate of George Washington, Gilpin served as a colonel in the Fairfax County Militia, participated in key battles of the war, and later contributed to the development of Alexandria's infrastructure and the Potomac River navigation. He was a signer of the Fairfax Resolves, a director of the Potomac Company, and the creator of the influential 1798 map of Alexandria. Gilpin also served as a pallbearer at Washington's funeral and held various public offices, including postmaster of Alexandria.

== Early life ==
George Gilpin was born on March 4, 1740, in Cecil County, Maryland, the youngest son of Samuel Gilpin and Jane Parker. His family was of Quaker heritage, though Gilpin himself did not adhere strictly to pacifist principles during the Revolutionary War. His older brother, Thomas Gilpin, was a non-combatant Quaker who was exiled during the war for suspected Loyalist sympathies and died in 1778 from privations endured in the mountains of Virginia. His brother Joseph Gilpin was a notable politician.

Prior to the Revolutionary War, Gilpin relocated to Alexandria, Virginia, where he established himself as a wheat merchant. In 1774, he served on the Fairfax County Committee of Safety and was appointed as Alexandria's inspector of flour the following year. On July 18, 1774, Gilpin was one of 25 signatories to the Fairfax Resolves, a set of resolutions drafted primarily by George Mason with input from George Washington, protesting British policies and asserting colonial rights. The resolves appointed Gilpin to a county committee empowered to address emergencies and adopt necessary measures.

== Revolutionary War service ==
In July 1775, Gilpin was commissioned as a colonel in a regiment of the Fairfax County Militia and the Virginia Regiment. He joined General George Washington's army at Dorchester Heights near Boston, serving as an aide during the siege of Boston. Gilpin remained with Washington through the New Jersey campaign and participated in major engagements, including the battles of Brandywine and Germantown.

During the harsh winter of 1777–1778 at Valley Forge, Pennsylvania, Gilpin visited his exiled brother Thomas near Winchester, Virginia. Upon returning, he traveled to York, Pennsylvania, where Congress was in session, to advocate for the release of Quaker exiles. Although he secured promises of amelioration, his brother died before full relief could be granted.

Gilpin's service extended to other fronts, including Bunker Hill, and he was recognized for his contributions to the patriot cause.

== Post-war career ==
After the war, Gilpin returned to Alexandria and became deeply involved in civic and commercial affairs. In 1785, he was appointed by the Virginia General Assembly as a commissioner for paving and grading the streets of Alexandria. That same year, he served as a commissioner negotiating interstate controversies over the Potomac River between Maryland and Virginia, which helped pave the way for broader discussions leading to the Constitutional Convention of 1787.

Under Washington's direction, Gilpin surveyed the Potomac River from tidewater to the upper falls, preparing plans for improving its navigation. He became a director of Potomac Company, founded in 1785 with Washington as president and fellow directors including Thomas Johnson, Thomas Sim Lee, and John Fitzgerald. The company aimed to enhance the river's navigability through canals, bypassing rapids such as those at Great Falls, to boost trade and position Alexandria as a major seaport. Although the company's efforts were later overshadowed by the Chesapeake and Ohio Canal, Gilpin's work advanced regional commerce.

As Fairfax County Surveyor, Gilpin oversaw the "banking out" process, which involved filling shallow areas of the Potomac River with material from demolished bluffs to expand Alexandria's waterfront and create wharves. This project was completed by 1798. In 1796, he surveyed the Spring Garden Farm, plotting lots and streets such as Mandeville Lane and Hamilton Avenue, intended as one of Alexandria's first subdivisions, though it did not fully develop; these elements later integrated with the Wilkes Street Cemetery Complex.

Gilpin is best known for his "Plan of the Town of Alexandria in the District of Columbia, 1798," commonly called the Gilpin Map. Drafted by Gilpin, engraved by Thomas Clarke of New York, and published by John V. Thomas in the Alexandria Times and District of Columbia Daily Advertiser on December 4, 1799 (just 10 days before Washington's death), the map detailed the city's street grid, block sizes, street widths, and river channel depths. It anticipated westward expansion and waterfront infill, reflecting Gilpin's vision for Alexandria's growth. Original impressions are rare, with copies held at the Library of Congress and George Washington University's Albert Small Collection.

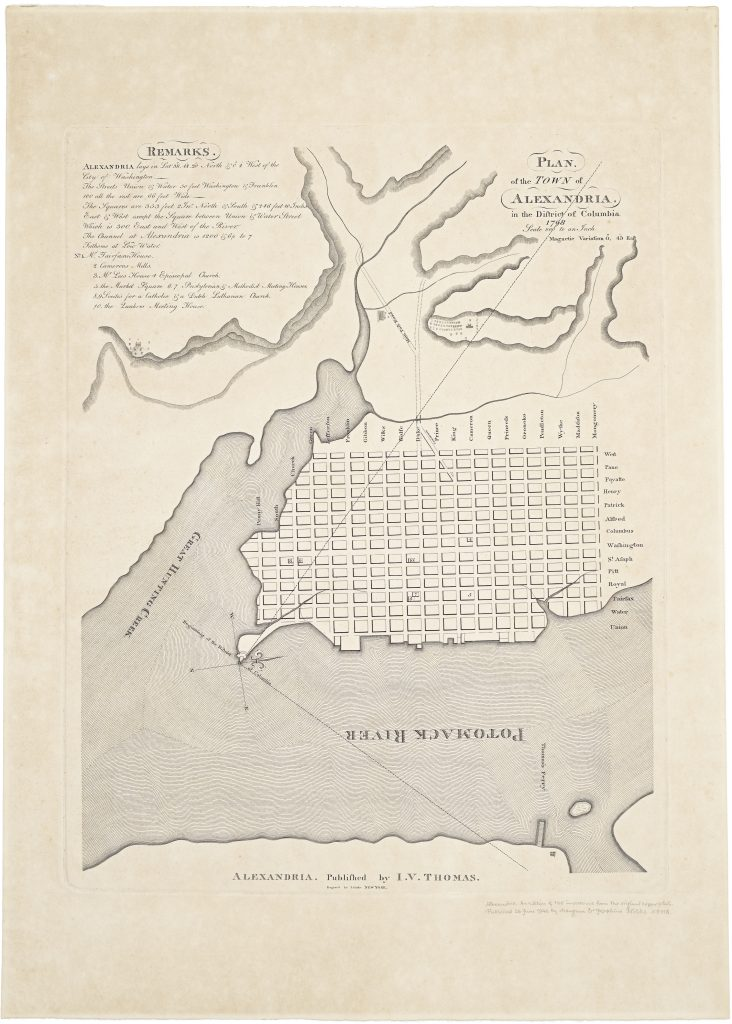
George Gilpin’s 1798 map of Alexandria Virginia

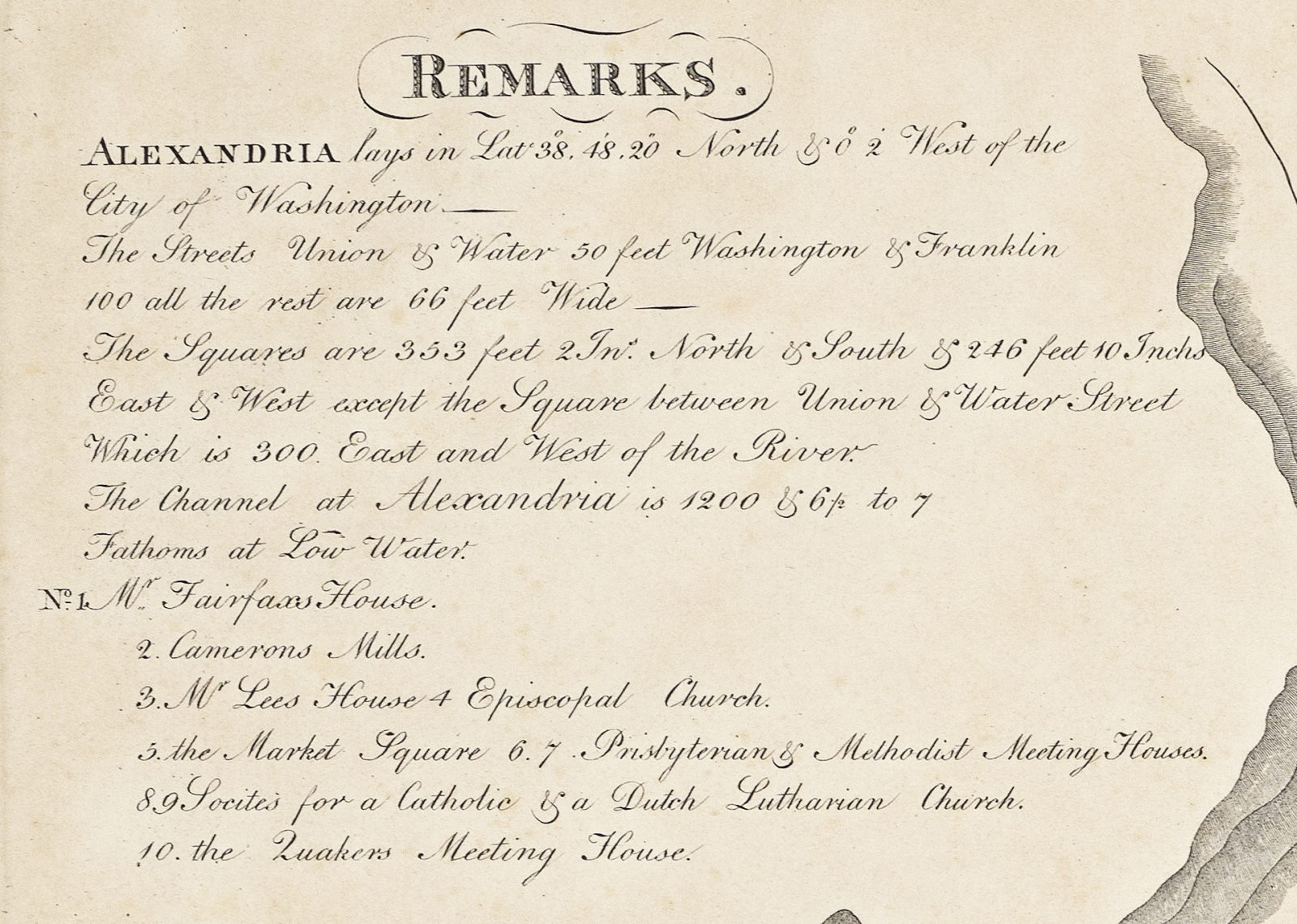
Gilpin Map Remarks

Gilpin held several public offices, including judge of the Orphans' Court in Alexandria in 1800 and postmaster from 1809 until his death in 1813, succeeding George Washington Craik. He was also a commissioner for the streets, a customs collector, and a magistrate in Fairfax and Alexandria counties for over four years.

Gilpin was an active Freemason in the Alexandria-Washington Masonic Lodge and attended the laying of the U.S. Capitol cornerstone on September 18, 1793, in a Masonic ceremony. He served as a vestryman at Christ Church in Alexandria.

== Personal life ==
Gilpin married twice, both times to sisters who were cousins of Martha Washington: first to Catherine Peters, with whom he had three children, and then to Jane Peters, with whom he had six more children. Among his descendants was daughter Maria (Mary) Gilpin (1768–1860), who remained unmarried and lived to age 92.

Gilpin maintained close ties with George Washington, frequently visiting Mount Vernon for dinners and business. Washington dined and stayed at Gilpin's home on several occasions, and in 1785, Gilpin loaned him a scow for collecting Potomac mud as an experimental fertilizer. Gilpin's residence at 208 King Street in Alexandria is marked by a historical plaque commemorating his life and service.

== Family ==
Genealogical records and family histories identify George Gilpin, his brother Joseph Gilpin, and Thomas Gilpin, as direct descendants of Richard de Gylpyn of Kentmere. Richard de Gylpyn is traditionally said to have been granted an estate in the early 1200s for killing a Wild Boar of Westmorland that had terrorized the region, an event memorialized in the boar’s head depicted on the Gilpin family crest.

Gilpin Coat of Arms

The family’s migration to North America in the late 17th century established this branch that would play notable roles in the political and social life of the colonies.

== Death and burial ==
Gilpin died on December 27, 1813, at 3 p.m. in Alexandria, in the 73rd year of his age. His funeral notice in the Alexandria Gazette described him as a champion of his country's cause, a benevolent and useful citizen, and a longtime magistrate. He was interred on December 28, 1813, in the burial ground of Christ Church with Masonic and military honors.

Gilpin was buried in Plot 76 of the Christ Church Episcopal Cemetery (established 1808) within the Wilkes Street Cemetery Complex in Alexandria, Virginia, at coordinates 38°48'06.412" N / 77°03'24.633" The plot, which he owned, contains the marked grave of his daughter Mary Gilpin. Gilpin's own grave was unmarked, but archival research, including a 1935 plat map by D.E. Bayless Jr., attributed it to him. In 2024, ground-penetrating radar (GPR) surveys conducted by archaeologist Mark Michael Ludlow confirmed a grave-like anomaly approximately four feet north of Mary's grave, presumed to be Gilpin's. Efforts to locate a missing gravestone through probing and shallow excavation in 2025 were unsuccessful, revealing only natural stones.

== Legacy ==
Gilpin's contributions to Alexandria's urban development, including waterfront expansion and the 1798 map, shaped the city's landscape for centuries. His work with the Potomac Company advanced early American infrastructure, and his service as a pallbearer at Washington's funeral on December 18, 1799, underscored his proximity to the nation's founders. Despite his accomplishments, Gilpin is often described as an "unsung architect" of Alexandria. A plaque at his former home honors his roles in the Revolution, surveying, and civic life. Descendants, including Heather Ross, have supported efforts to confirm and commemorate his burial site.
