= Henry Airay =

Preacher, author

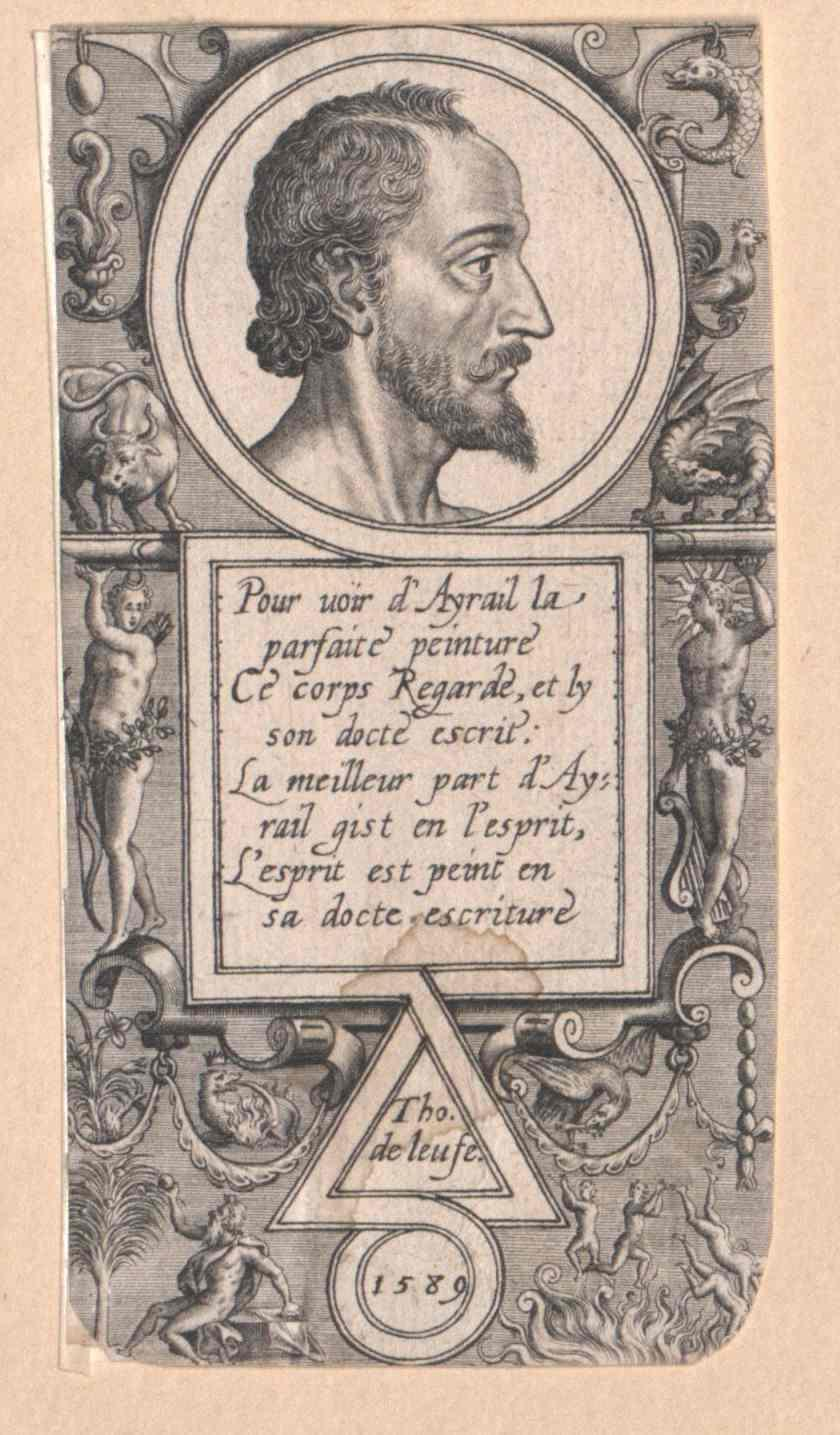

Henry Airay (c. 1560 – 6 October 1616), was an Anglican priest, theologian, and academic.

Airay was born at Kentmere, near Kendal, Westmorland. His date of birth is uncertain. His father was William Airay, a favored servant of Bernard Gilpin, "the apostle of the North". Gilpin generously agreed to send Henry and his brother Evan (or Ewan) to Gilpin's own endowed school, where they were educated "in grammatical learning," and were in attendance at Oxford when Gilpin died. From Wood's Athenae Oxonienses we glean the details of Airay's college attendance:

He was sent to St Edmund's Hall in 1579, aged nineteen or thereabouts. Soon after he was translated to Queen's College, where he became pauper puer serviens; that is, a poor serving child that waits on the fellows in the common hall at meals, and in their chambers, and does other servile work about the college.

His transference to Queen's is perhaps explained by its having been Gilpin's college, and by his Westmorland origin giving him a claim on Eaglesfield's foundation. He graduated B.A. on 19 June 1583, M.A. on 15 June 1586, B.D. in 1594 and D.D. on 17 June 1600 — all in Queen's College. "About the time he was master" (1586) "he entered holy orders, and became a frequent and zealous preacher in the university."

His Commentary on the Epistle to the Philippians (1618, reprinted 1864) is a specimen of his preaching before his college, and of his fiery denunciation of Roman Catholicism and his fearless enunciation of that Calvinism which Oxford in common with all England then prized. In 1598 he was chosen provost of his college, and in 1606 was named vice-chancellor of the university. In the discharge of his vice-chancellor's duties he came into conflict with Laud, Archbishop of Canterbury, who was beginning to manifest his antagonism to Calvinism.

Airay was also rector of Otmore (or Otmoor), near Oxford, a living which involved him in a trying but successful litigation, whereof later incumbents reaped the benefit. He died on 6 October 1616, and was buried in the Queen's Chapel. His character as a man, preacher, divine, and as an important ruler in the university, will be found portrayed in the Epistle by Christopher Potter, prefixed to the Commentary.
