= George Gilpin =

English diplomat

George Gilpin (1514–1602) was an English diplomat.

== Life ==
George Gilpin is sometimes called the Elder, to distinguish him from the eldest son of his elder brother. He was the second son of Edwin Gilpin of Kentmere, Westmoreland, by Margaret, daughter of Thomas Layton of Dalemain, Cumberland, and elder brother of Bernard Gilpin.

In 1553 George Gilpin was at Mechlin, where he was studying the civil law, when Bernard visited him. In 1554, George received a letter from Bishop Cuthbert Tunstall, just released from the Tower of London, offering Bernard a benefice if he would return to England; George was anxious that his brother should accept the offer, and would seem at this time to have been still a Catholic. He must, however, have become a Protestant convert soon after, and in Elizabeth's reign become absorbed in politics.

He was for the rest of his life one of the queen's most trusted agents in her negotiations with the states of the Low Countries, frequently referred to in the State Papers, Francis Russell, 2nd Earl of Bedford is said to have first brought him to court. In 1561 the queen in a letter to Sir Thomas Gresham promises to befriend his secretary Gilpin in any reasonable suit, and he would seem to have shortly afterwards become a salaried servant of the English government.

He handled English diplomatic affairs on an informal basis in the period 1579 to 1582, while Secretary of the Merchant Adventurers. He later served as English Secretary to the Dutch Council of State from 1586 and became a Councillor in 1593, remaining such until his death.

He was commissioned by Queen Elizabeth I to form an alliance between the Dutch States and the English against the Spanish Armada. He was minister to The Hague during her reign. He carried with him an autographed letter written by the Queen stating:

"Having charged Mr. Gilpin, one of our councilors of State, to deliver this letter, it will not be necessary to authorize him by any other confidence than what is already acquired by a long proof of his capacity and of his fidelity and sincerity, assuring you you may trust in him as in ourselves."

At the end of his life he supported the author John Dickenson, employing as secretary at The Hague. His death is announced in a letter to Dudley Carleton, dated 2 October 1602, which mentions the difficulty of finding a successor.

== Works ==
Gilpin published a translation of the Apiarium Romanum (1571) by Philip von Marnix, seigneur de St. Aldegonde. The first edition was entitled The Beehive of the Romishe Churche, and was dedicated to Philip Sidney. The second edition appeared in 1580; Abraham Fleming compiled the table. Other editions followed in 1598, 1623, and 1636.

Many of Gilpin's letters are to Dudley Carleton. Calisthenes Brooke, writing to Carleton in Paris, calls him "your cousin Gilpin".
