= Post-presidency of George Washington =

Overview of George Washington's post-presidency

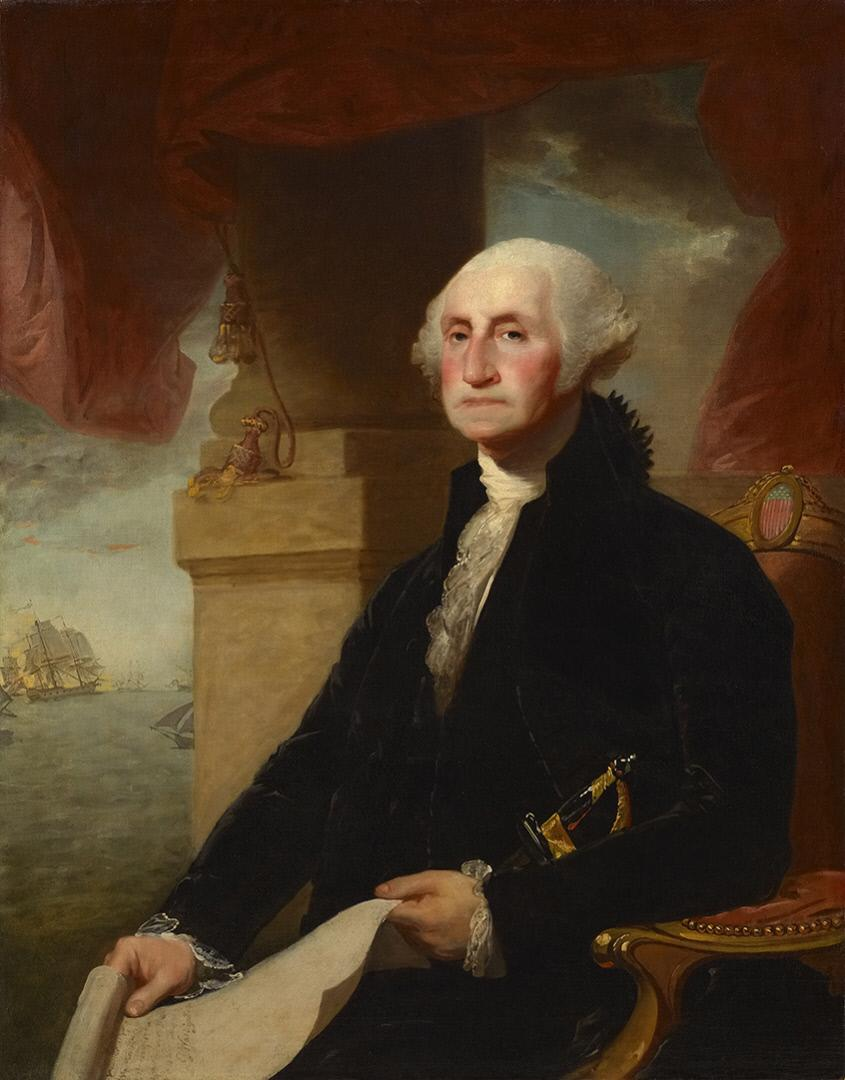
- George Washington (The Constable-Hamilton Portrait); Gilbert Stuart 1797

President of the United States
- In office April 30, 1789 (Note: March 4 is the official start of the first presidential term. April 6 is when Congress counted the votes of the Electoral College and certified a president. April 30 is when Washington was sworn in.) – March 4, 1797

Personal details
- Born: February 22, 1732 Popes Creek, Colony of Virginia, British America
- Died: December 14, 1799 (aged 67) Mount Vernon, Virginia, U.S.
- Cause of death: Epiglottitis and hypovolemic shock
- Resting place: Washington Family Tomb, Mount Vernon, Virginia, U.S.
- Spouse: Martha Dandridge (m. 1759)

George Washington was the first U.S. president under the U.S. Constitution. He served two consecutive terms in office from 1789 to 1797. He returned to his beloved home, Mount Vernon, on March 15, 1797. Immediately, he began months of repair because of neglect and mismanagement. In time, he was able to restore the Mount Vernon mansion house. The salvaging of his farms proved to be problematic. Throughout his retirement, Washington entertained local friends, former official associates, and strangers who wished to converse and see the first president, the Revolutionary War hero, and founder of the nation.

Washington closely followed affairs of state, including the growing tension between France and the United States, which, by the spring of 1798, had developed into the Quasi-War. Attacked politically by anti-Federalists, Washington was careful to preserve his personal legacy. He was appointed by his successor, President John Adams, on July 2, 1798, as Lieutenant General and Commander of America's newly-augmented army. Washington insisted for active command to be vested in Alexander Hamilton, whom Adams appointed Major General and Inspector of the Armies. Washington performed his duties, but Adams was jealous of Hamilton and was a proponent of naval power. Adams, however, was able to end the Quasi-War through diplomacy.

In the summer of 1799, Washington drafted a new will that left most of his estate to his wife, Martha. Unexpectedly, he set free all of the slaves that he owned outright, a legal order to be fulfilled after his wife's death. Washington's will was meant to be an act of atonement for a lifetime spent in human exploitation, and he hoped it would serve as an example to other slaveholders and hasten the end of American slavery. His post-presidency lasted less than three years until his sudden illness and death, which were caused by a severe throat infection, on December 14, 1799. Washington had planned a library to preserve his war and presidential papers, but he died before it could be built. In January 1801, Martha freed his slaves.

The Washington Monument was completed in 1885. Mount Rushmore, completed in 1941, has a gigantic Washington stone portrait sculpture to honor his presidency. In 2013, the Washington presidential library was completed and opened to the public.

== Background ==
George Washington, the first president elected under the U.S. Constitution, was born on February 22, 1732, in the Colony of Virginia. Washington served in the Virginia militia, was appointed Lieutenant Colonel and was British General Edward Braddock's aide-de-camp during the French and Indian War. In 1759, he married the wealthy widow Martha Custis, and they established their home at Mount Vernon. From 1759 to 1774, Washington served in the Virginia House of Burgesses and was considered a "cautious and prudent Virginia aristocrat."

From 1775 to 1783, Washington was the commander of the Continental Army during the American Revolutionary War. After the war, British King George III granted America independence from Britain under the Treaty of Paris. Washington retired from the military and took up farming again at Mount Vernon as a celebrated war hero. Washington was elected President of the United States in 1789 and served for two consecutive terms of office after being re-elected in 1792. John Adams was elected to office in 1796 and succeeded Washington in 1797.

When Washington left office in 1797, the nation was divided into a two-party system, the Republicans and the Federalists, the latter of which dominated the U.S. Congress. The dispute with France over Washington's alliance with Great Britain in the Jay Treaty had not been settled, and the country was on the verge of the Quasi-War. Except for strong political criticism from the Republicans, the public figure of Washington was a legend as a general and the first president. Washington attended Adams's presidential inauguration on March 4, 1797, in Philadelphia and read aloud his final brief "farewell address." He was eager to return to his beloved home of Mount Vernon after he had served two consecutive terms of office. Before his departure, Washington sold and gave away his belongings, including a writing desk that contained love letters from his wife, Martha.

Although no one dared to challenge Washington for the presidency, his reputation, during the second half of this second term in office was under scrutiny of the Republican Party, which had been founded by Thomas Jefferson and James Madison. Although Washington was neutral politically, his core beliefs sided mainly with the Federalist Party. On July 30, 1796, the Aurora, an anti-Federalist newspaper, published Thomas Paine's open letter to Washington. Paine, who had been imprisoned in France, said of Washington that "the world will be puzzled to decide whether you are an apostate or an impostor; whether you have abandoned good principles, or whether you ever had any." Pro-French Republican editorials accused Washington of being a "tyrannical monster," and his lauded Farewell Address was castigated "the loathings of a sick mind." Washington, however, was determined to defend his reputation.

== Return to Mount Vernon ==
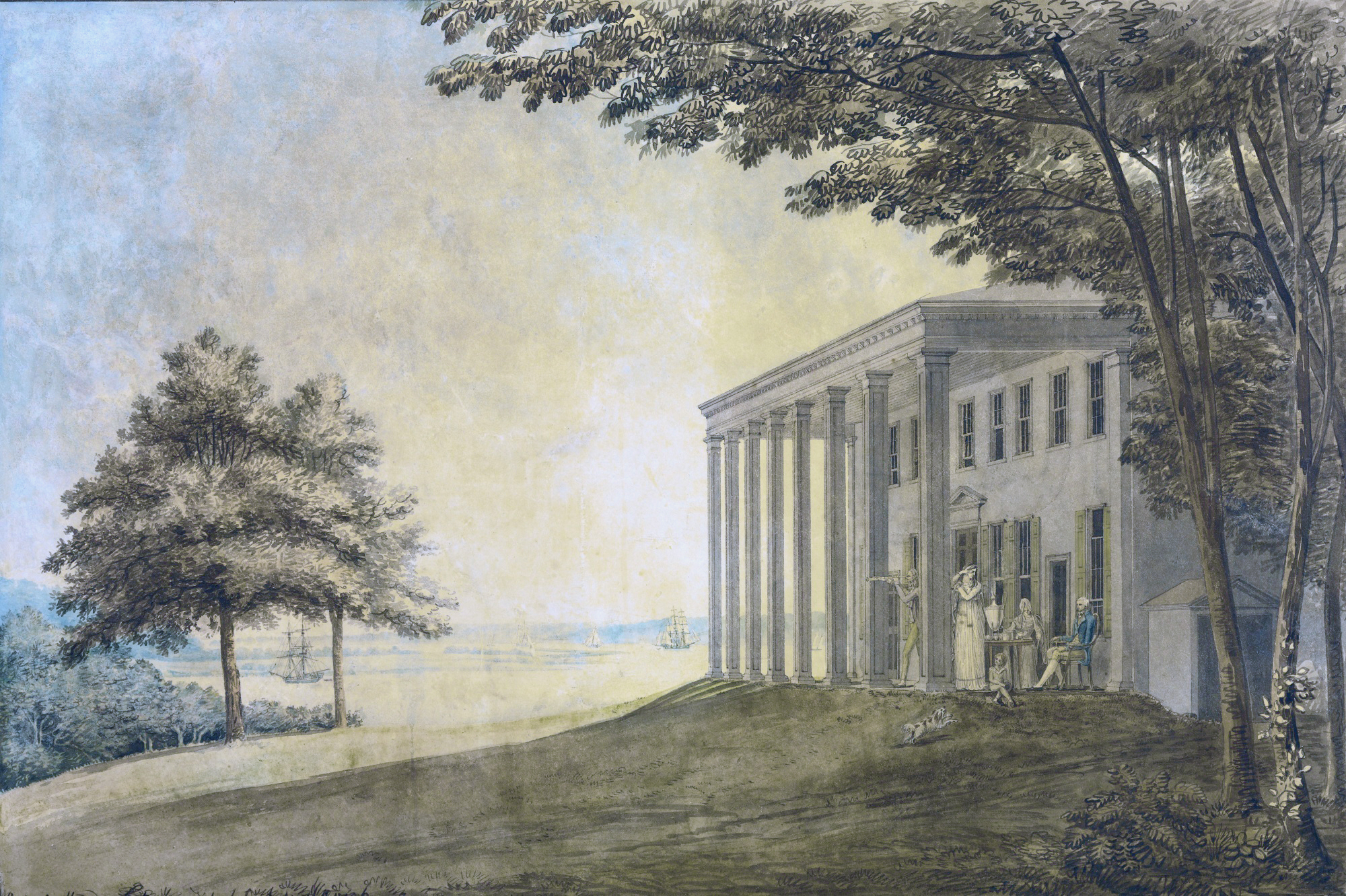
A View of Mount Vernon With Washington Family On the Terrace. Artist: Benjamin Henry Latrobe, 1796.

Washington departed Philadelphia for Mount Vernon on March 9, 1797, and he traveled with Martha, his granddaughter Nelly, and George Washington Lafayette. The party arrived at Mount Vernon "six days" later, having made a few stops along the way, as Washington was a celebrated hero. In April, he opined in a letter that he was "once more seated under my own vine and fig tree" and hoped "to spend the remainder of my days." Washington was so intent on staying within 25 miles of Mount Vernon that he respectfully declined to attend the wedding of his nephew Lawrence Augustine Washington.

Washington's sister, Betty Lewis, died, and Washington was survived only by his younger brother Charles, the last of their generation of the Washington family. The death of Betty caused Washington "inexpressible concern."

Washington sent much of his vast collection of paper archives on the Revolutionary War and his presidency to Mount Vernon. He had a letterpress delivered to make copies of his papers. The archives originally contained "30 to 40 cases" of military expeditions, journals, and Congressional correspondence. Washington originally planned to build a library house at Mount Vernon and had ordered bookcases for his collections. However, his death prevented the building of the library. Washington's collections and the planned library would be a precursor for the modern presidential library system adopted in the 20th century by Congress.

=== Renovations ===
Upon his return, Washington found his five farms and buildings at Mount Vernon were in ruins. He diligently put to work carpenters, masons, and painters to fix the buildings and the mansion house while he made efforts to rehabilitate his farmlands. Washington enjoyed what he called "the Music of hammers, or the odiferous smell of Paint." The army of workers under Washington's command created large dust clouds over his lands. Washington believed the enormous cost of the renovations was the equivalent of "an entire new establishment."

=== Possible daily schedule ===
Washington would wake promptly at 5 a.m., wake his hirelings, and give them their assignments for the day. Washington chastised those of "their indisposition" who did not show up for work. At 7:00, Washington ate a meal of cornbread, butter, and honey that was easy to eat and reduced the pain that he suffered from ill-fitting dentures and swollen gums. Afterward, Washington mounted his horse and supervised his farms for six hours. He tended to his new distillery and ordered ditches to be widened.

In one instance, he monitored the health of a slave who had been bitten by a crazed dog. Washington forbade the poaching of deer on his lands. At 2:00 p.m., Washington returned to the mansion house and dined with guests at 3:00. After the meal, Washington showed his medals; prints of war battles by John Trumbull; and a key of the Bastille, a relic of the French Revolution that had been given to him by Lafayette. At the time, Washington was considered a "living legend," and many strangers visited Mount Vernon to see Washington in person.

== Republican and Federalist feud ==
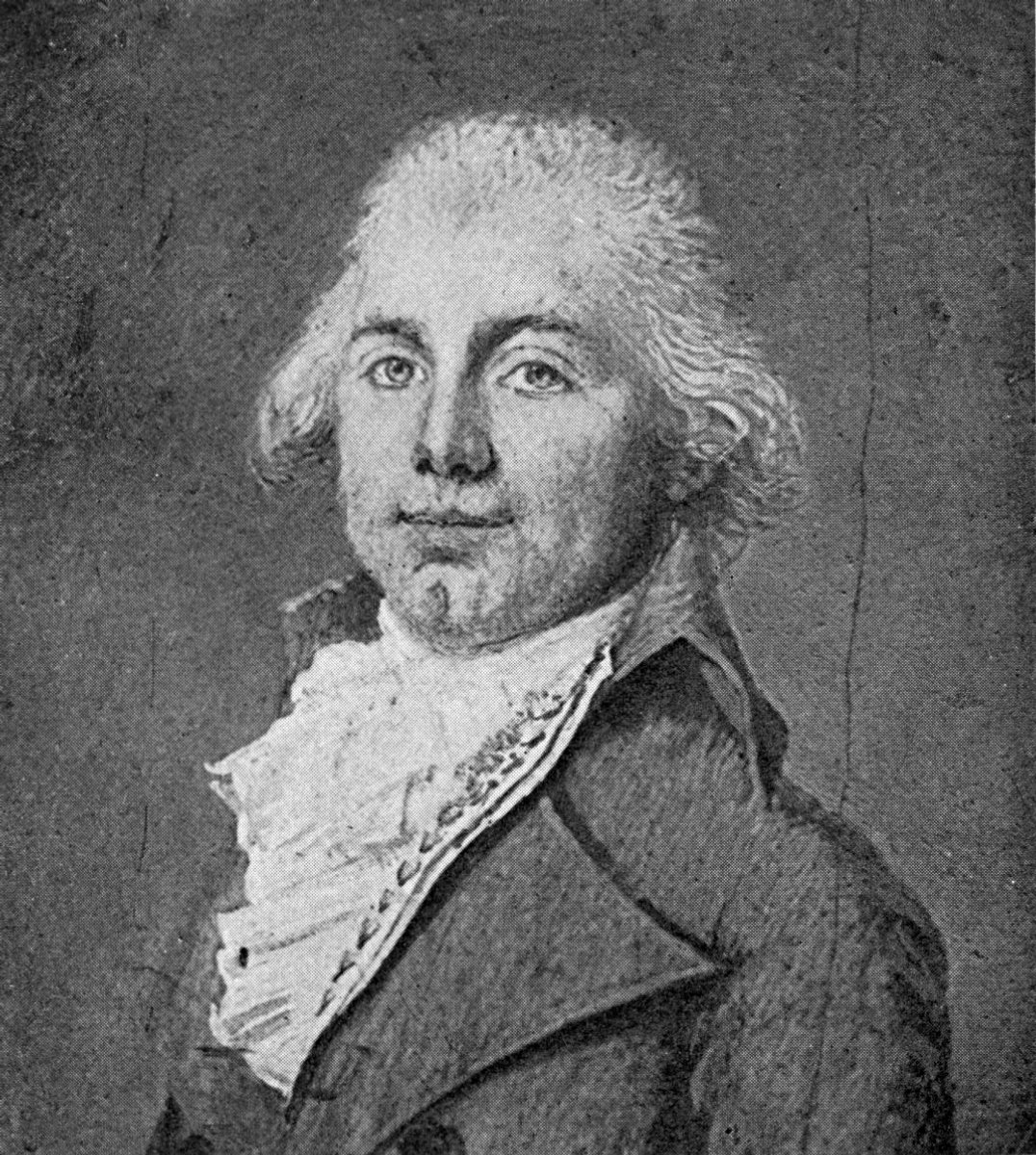
James Monroe, a Republican politician, denounced the Jay Treaty in a 1798 publication. Artist: Louis Semé, 1794.

After Washington's presidency, the feud between Republicans and Federalists became toxic and inadvertently drew the former president into the foray. In March 1798, James Monroe, a Republican and former Minister to France who had been appointed by Washington, published an address that was critical of Washington's recall of him from office in an attempt to cover up his own insubordination. Monroe's denouncement of the Jay Treaty was a direct attack on Washington, who was furious after he read Monroe's pamphlet. He went to his study and responded by writing a line-by-line sarcastic and bitter critique of Monroe's tirade.

Washington had also been informed of a bizarre plot invented by Thomas Jefferson's nephew, Peter Carr, a Republican agitator. On September 25, 1797, Carr sent a letter to Washington, under the pseudonym John Langhorne, to entice him to attack Republicans, which would be circulated in the Republican press. Washington did not respond, and the plot was thwarted. Washington, however, took things further and blamed the plot on Jefferson. His relationship with the fellow Virginian Jefferson disintegrated. In March 1798, Washington agreed with a negative assessment that Jefferson was "one of the most artful, intriguing, industrious and double-faced politicians in America."

Washington went on the offensive. While visiting the Federal City, Washington publicly denounced the French Revolution. Washington through his letters described an overall conspiracy, beyond the pro-French Republicans, that was designed to overthrow the government. He wrote to Lafayette that "a party exists in the United States, formed by a combination of causes, who oppose the government in all its measures, and are determined (as all their conduct evinces) by clogging its wheels, indirectly to change the nature of it, and to subvert the Constitution." Washington also foolhardily endorsed John Adams's Federalist Alien and Sedition Acts, which were passed by Congress to quell the incendiary Republicans. Washington was also vindicated in the aftermath of a French bribery scandal, the XYZ Affair. The result was a public backlash against the Republicans' support of the French government.

== Quasi-War ==
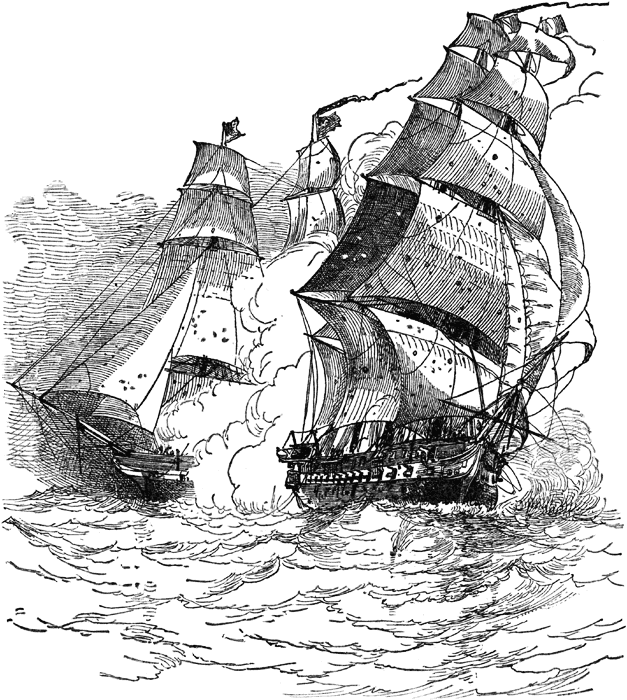
Constellation captured the French Navy's frigate L'Insurgente.

When Washington began his presidency in April 1789, France had been a strong ally with the United States, and Louis XVI had strongly supported financially and militarily American independence from Britain during the American Revolutionary War. Six days into his first term, the French Revolution plunged Europe into war, between France and Britain, and President Washington and his administration chose to remain neutral. On January 21, 1793, Louis XVI was executed by guillotine. Matters became more complicated when Washington signed the Jay Treaty in 1794 during his second term, which formalised commercial and diplomatic reproachment with Britain. In 1795, the French started to respond by capturing over 2,000 American merchant ships, and the American navy retaliated, attacked, and captured French naval ships. The French revolutionary wars continued after Washington's presidency.

Upon assuming office, President Adams had to repair the damage caused by Washington's "shattered neutrality policy." Preparation for war between the United States and France took place in 1798 after the XYZ Affair. Unable to remain neutral, Adams had to respond to French belligerency on the high seas that culminated in what was called the Quasi-War. On July 2, 1798, Adams appointed Washington as Lieutenant General and Commander of the Provisional American Army, but controversy ensued in choosing Washington's subordinate generals. On July 11, 1798, Secretary of State James McHenry, who personally traveled to Mount Vernon, presented Washington with a letter and commission from Adams, which had been approved by Congress. Washington accepted the commission but demanded not to actively serve unless the French invaded the United States. A terrible controversy ensued over Washington's suggested appointments for his subordinate generals. Adams, who both respected and was jealous of Washington's military prowess, reluctantly agreed.

Washington chose his former Treasury Secretary Alexander Hamilton, who was recommended to Adams by Washington to be appointed Major General and Inspector General of the Army, and Henry Knox and Charles Cotesworth Pinckney were to serve as major generals. Knox, who desired Hamilton's position, protested to Adams, who contemplated the change. When McHenry and Adams's Secretary of the Treasury Oliver Wolcott Jr. protested Knox as second in command, Adams demurred to Washington and appointed Hamilton, instead of Knox, who refused to take his commission as a major general. Washington remained at Mount Vernon while Adams started negotiations with France. Although Washington would not live to the war's end, the crisis was resolved in 1800 through Adams's diplomacy.

== Emancipation ==
Since the Revolutionary War, Washington was troubled by slavery and had for some time been contemplating freeing his slaves and reducing the size of his plantation. Washington knew that posterity or future generations would judge him harshly for his ownership of slaves. He initially planned to sell lands, free his slaves, and use the money from the sale of lands to support his slaves, but he could not find any buyers.

During the summer of 1799, Washington made a new will, that stipulated all of the 124 slaves he owned outright would be freed after the death of his wife, Martha. Washington was concerned over the effects of splitting slave families and on Martha's financial status and so he delayed his slaves' freedom. Both the young and old would be cared for. The young freedmen would be brought up in a trade, and the elder freedmen would live off an annuity provided by Washington's estate.

Washington was well aware of how divisive abolition would be in slaveholding Virginia and so he demanded that his slaves would not be sold or forced to leave Virginia after their freedom. In that sense, Washington's intention may have been for blacks and whites to live together in Virginia as equal citizens, rather than be deported to Africa or recolonized. Washington's elderly valet-shoemaker slave William Lee was freed outright for his "faithful services during the Revolutionary War." Washington gave Lee an annuity of $30.

The historian John Ferling believed that Washington's will was an act of atonement for the life he spent in human exploitation. Additionally, Washington hoped that his example would lead other slaveowners to take a similar step. After Washington's death, Martha feared that his slaves were planning to kill her to obtain their freedom since his will stipulated their freedom was contingent upon her death. To prevent that, although it was unlikely that his slaves would have killed her, Martha manumitted all of Washington's slaves on January 1, 1801. Washington and Martha could not free any of the Custis slaves by law. They would be reverted to the Custis estate upon Martha's death, and divided among her grandchildren. Washington's will and the manumission (freedom) of his slaves had a reverse effect on Virginia society, which in 1806 passed more restrictive measures for slaveowners to free their slaves.

== Sudden sickness and death ==
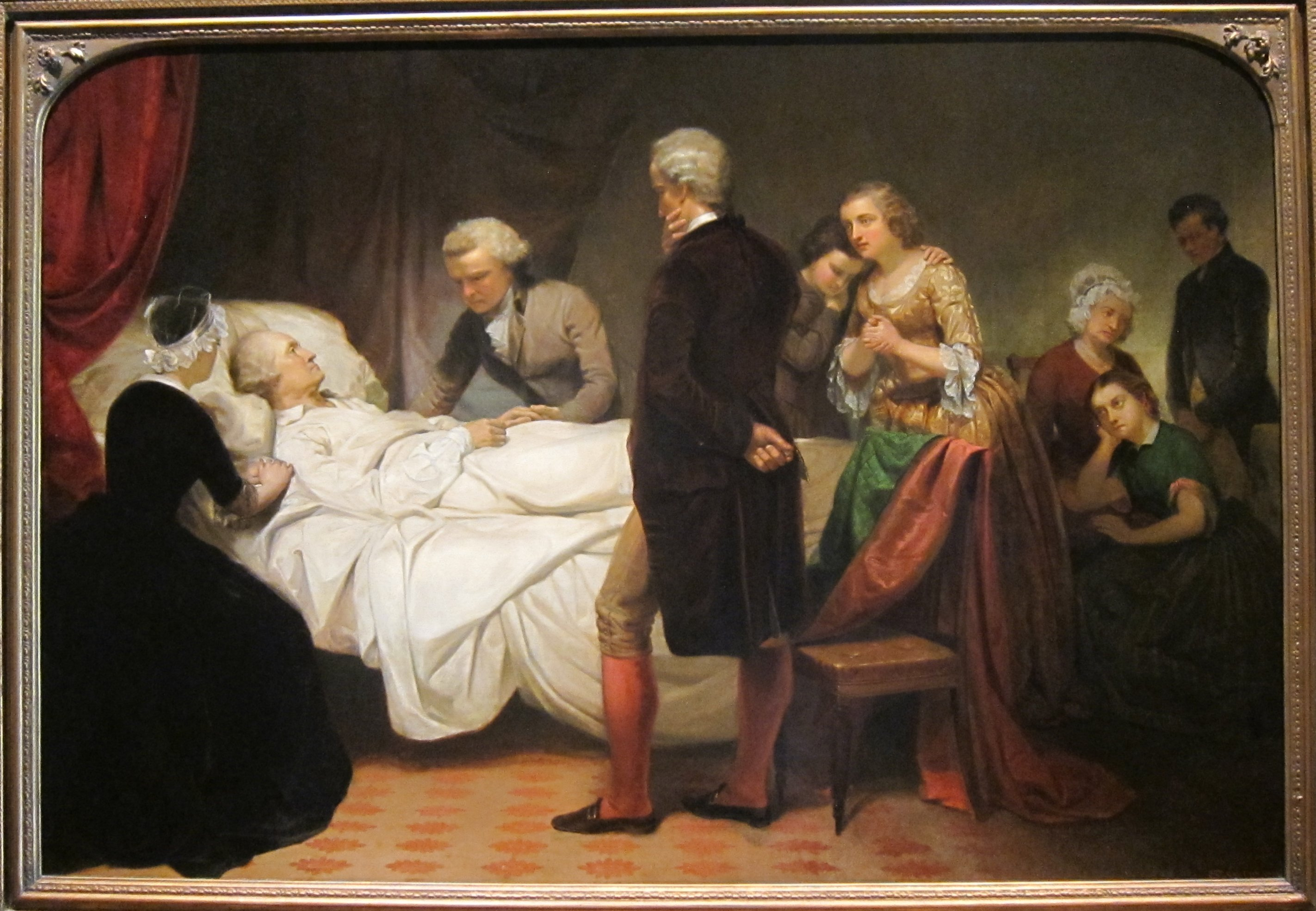
Washington on His Deathbed, by Junius Brutus Stearns, 1799

On December 12, 1799, a severe storm passed over Mount Vernon and the surrounding region that deposited heavy snow, sleet, and hail. Washington was not dismayed and continued his rigorous routine of riding for five hours and making rounds at Mount Vernon. When he returned to the mansion, he refused to change his wet clothes out of courtesy so that he could dine with his guests. On December 13, Washington had a hoarse throat but continued to work outside in the cold weather to mark trees for pruning. Although he knew that he had a cold, he refused to get treatment. He told himself, "Let it go as it came."

The following day, at 3:00 a.m. on December 14, Washington woke up and was acutely ill, with his speaking voice barely audible, and he had extreme difficulty breathing. Dr. James Craik, Washington's personal physician, and two other doctors, Dr. Gustavus Richard Brown and Dr. Elisha C. Dick, were called to Mount Vernon. Washington's condition rapidly worsened while his doctors purged or bled him and administered various standard medical procedures of the time, all of which had no positive effect to help their dying patient. Dick was strongly against Washington's fourth and final purge because it would seriously weaken Washington, whose skin color had turned blue, a condition of oxygen deprivation. Seeing the gravity of the situation, Dick, the youngest of the three consulting doctors, recommended a tracheotomy to allow air into Washington's lungs and save the patient's life, but the two senior physicians refused to have the fairly-new surgical procedure performed. Towards midnight, unable to breathe, Washington died. Both senior physicians diagnosed Washington's fatal illness as quinsey or cynanche tracheal, but Dick thought that the condition was a more serious "violent inflammation of the throat." More recent scholarship has concluded that Washington most probably died of acute bacterial epiglottitis.

=== Funeral and entombment ===
Following the instructions in his will, Washington's military funeral took place on December 18, 1799, at Mount Vernon. It was restricted to family, friends, and associates, rather than a grandiose state funeral. The funeral started at 3:00 p.m., when a schooner moored in the Potomac began firing its guns every minute. Inscriptions on the silver plate of Washington's coffin included "Surge Ad Judicium", meaning "Rise to Judgment", and "Gloria Deo," meaning "Glory to God". Military officers and fellow masons served as pallbearers these men were Colonel Charles Little, Colonel Charles Simms, Colonel William Payne, Colonel George Gilpin, Colonel Dennis Ramsey, and Colonel Philip Marsteller. A musical band from Alexandria played a funeral dirge. A Masonic apron and Washington's sword adorned his coffin, and his trusted horse was led by two slaves in black attire as it passed in front of his body.

Dick attended the funeral and was in charge of directing all of the Masonic rituals. Mount Vernon has since become a patriotic destination for the American public to pay tribute to George Washington, for his contributions as the first President under the Constitution, and for his leadership as Commanding General during the American Revolutionary War. Washington's body was interred inside his communal family vault in an overgrown hillside, under a knoll of trees, mixed in with other coffins, and Washington had left instructions for a new brick vault. Early visitors of his vault complained of the poor conditions and neglect. (Note: In 1831 Washington's old family vault, that he was interred in, was broken into and bones were stolen. This created an alarm among his remaining family estate. The bones, not Washington's, were returned and Washington's nephew, Major Lawrence Lewis, the same year, made the new vault Washington had requested 31 years earlier. The same year, Washington's coffin and remains were moved to the new Vault. The front of the new tomb consisted of a gothic iron gateway mounted on the stone coping.) (Note: On October 7, 1837, Washington and his original lead casket were placed inside a sarcophagus, made by John Struthers, covered, and sealed. Rather than put into the damp new vault, inappropriate for public viewing, Struthers had a new structure built, specifically made for Washington, on the outside of the vault, with a marble floor, covered by a metal roof, and guarded by an iron gate, to protect from robbery and vandalism. The lid of Washington's sarcophagus was inscribed "WASHINGTON". A second marble sarcophagus was made for his wife Martha's remains, adjacent to Washington's sarcophagus and his remains.)

=== Philadelphia memorial service ===
On December 19, 1799, U.S. Representative John Marshall formally announced to the House of Representatives that Washington had died at Mount Vernon. On December 23, Marshall spoke before Congress and initiated a process that would become the groundwork for an organized federal-state funeral. Congress proposed a marble memorial for Washington in the Federal City, and organized a funeral procession in honor of Washington in Philadelphia. A week later, the procession was led by a trumpeter and started from Congressional Hall, leading through the streets of Philadelphia and ending at a German Lutheran Church. At the church, General Henry Lee gave a memorial speech. Lee famously said that Washington was "[f]irst in war, first in peace, and first in the hearts of his countrymen." Congress, however, later dominated by U.S. President Thomas Jefferson and the Democratic-Republicans, failed to go through on its pledge to fund and create the marble memorial. To honor Washington, the Federal City would soon bear his name, Washington, D.C.

== Aftermath ==
After his death, Washington was mourned by the nation and eulogized as the "man who unites all hearts." Washington was viewed as a general and statesman who united Patriots during the Revolutionary War and held the nation together during his presidency. He was considered above all an "American", rather than a southerner or northerner.

According to historian T.H. Breen, Washington "enhanced the legitimacy" of the U.S. Constitution. Breen said Washington "brought immense political capital to the presidency. He may have been the most charismatic person ever to hold the office. Everything about the man --- his behavior, dress, and pronouncements, even his coach --- became emblematic of the new constitutional order. In a profound symbolic sense, he was the new nation."

On December 6, 1884, the Washington Monument to honor George Washington was completed and was dedicated on February 21, 1885. In October 1941 the Mount Rushmore monument was completed that honored Washington first among three other presidents. (Note: The Mount Rushmore Monument honored four presidents: George Washington, Thomas Jefferson, Abraham Lincoln, and Theodore Roosevelt.)

=== Presidential library ===
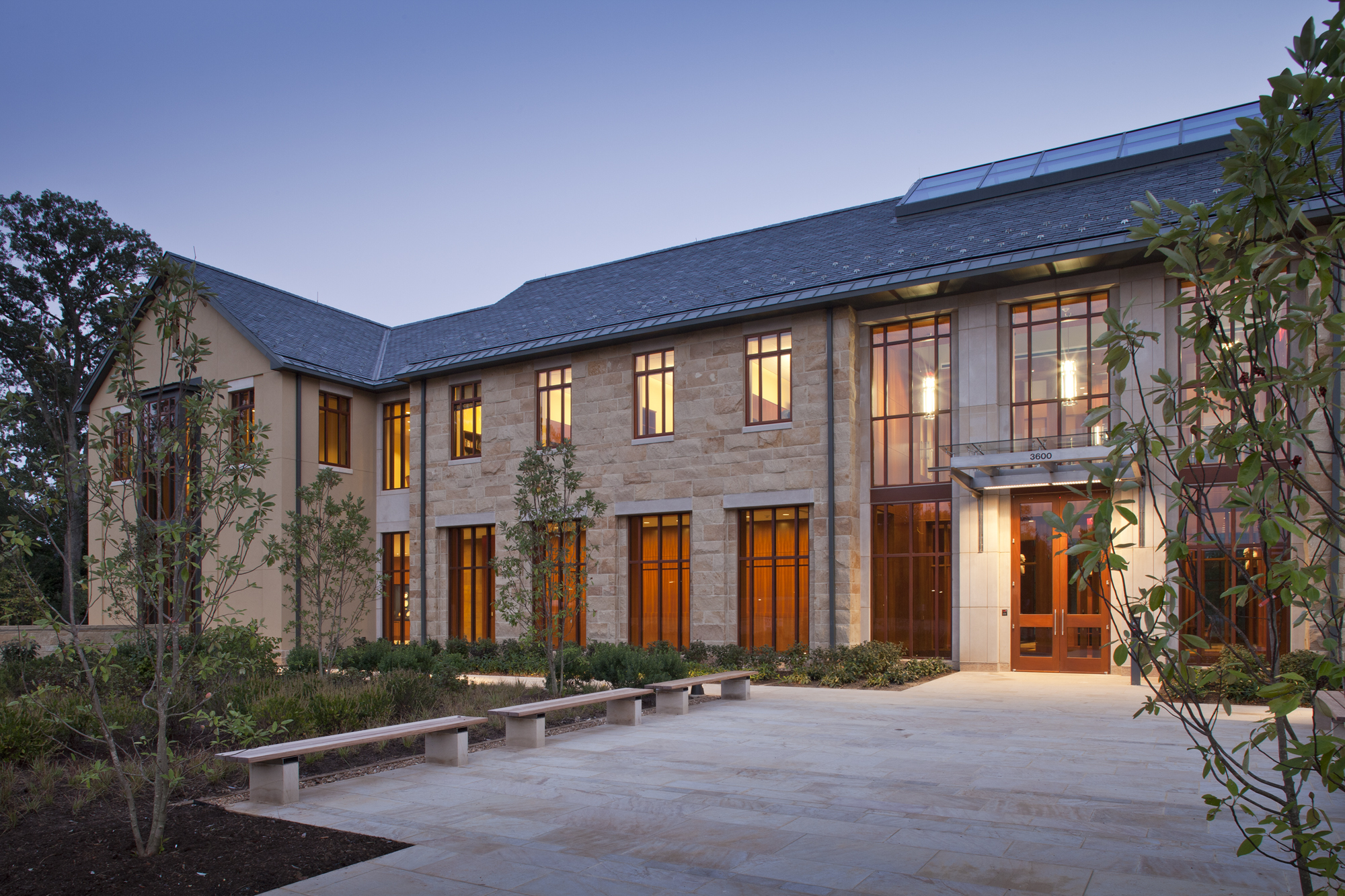
Washington Presidential Library

During the post-World War II patriotic-era of the 20th Century, Congress became concerned over the preservation of Presidential history and documents. The Presidential Libraries Act (1955) established presidential libraries for Presidents to be privately constructed and federally maintained. The Presidential Records Act (1978) established that document records of Presidents are the property of the United States. The Presidential Libraries Act (1986) required that private endowments be linked to the Presidential Libraries and to help pay the maintenance costs.

In 1986, the Mount Vernon Ladies’ Association (MVLA), sought to educate the world of Washington's importance and life history. In 2010, MVLA planned the building of Fred W. Smith National Library for the Study of George Washington, to further the appreciation of Washington. The groundbreaking for the Library was in April 2011. The Library was completed and opened on September 27, 2013, to the public. The Library facility is 45,000 square feet and contains Washington's books, manuscripts, newspapers, and documents and also is a scholarly retreat and place of education.

== Sources ==
- "2011 Earthquake". National Park Service Washington Memorial. November 25, 2018.
- Akers, Charles W. (2002). "John Adams". In Graff, Henry (ed.). The Presidents: A Reference History (7th ed.). New York City: Charles Scribner's Sons. pp. 23–38. ISBN 0-684-80551-0.
- Boston to Washington: A Complete Pocket Guide To The Great Eastern Cities And The Centennial Exhibition With Maps. Cambridge: Hurd And Houghton The Riverside Press. 1876.
- Breen, T.H. (2016). George Washington's Journey: The President Forges a New Nation. New York: Simon & Schuster Paperbacks. ISBN 978-1-4516-7542-9.
- Chernow, Ron (2010). Washington: A Life. Penguin Press. ISBN 978-1-59420-266-7., Pulitzer Prize
- Cooke, Jacob E. (2002). "George Washington". In Graff, Henry (ed.). The Presidents: A Reference History (7th ed.). New York City: Charles Scribner's Sons. pp. 1–21. ISBN 0-684-80551-0.
- Corneliussen, Erin (May 12, 2014). "The Best View of Washington is Now Open to the Public". Smithsonian.com.
- Eliassen, Meredith. "Mourning George Washington". mountvernon.org. San Francisco State University: The Mount Vernon Ladies' Association.
- Ellis, Joseph J. (2004). His Excellency: George Washington. Alfred A. Knopf. ISBN 978-1-4000-4031-5.
- Ferling, John E. (2000). Setting the World Ablaze: Washington, Adams, Jefferson, and the American Revolution. New York: Oxford University Press. ISBN 0-19-513409-5.
- Flexner, James Thomas (1974). Washington: The Indispensable Man. Boston: Little, Brown. ISBN 0-316-28605-2.
- "Fred W. Smith National Library for the Study of George Washington". mountvernon.org. Mount Vernon Ladies' Association. 2019.
- Ford, Worthington Chauncey (1900). George Washington. Vol. 2. New York: C. Scribner's Sons.
- Grizzard, Frank E. (2002). George Washington: A Biographical Companion. Santa Barbara, California: ABC-CLIO. ISBN 1-57607-558-3.
- Henriques, Peter R. (2008). Realistic Visionary: A Portrait of George Washington. University of Virginia Press. pp. 194, 196. ISBN 9780813927411.
- Kurzius, Rachel (September 5, 2017). "Closed For More Than A Year, Washington Monument Isn't Expected To Reopen Until Spring 2019". dcist. Archived from the original on March 21, 2019.
- Lear, Tobias (1799). Tobias Lear to William Augustine Washington December 15, 1799 (The Writings of George Washington, Volume 14). G. P Putman & Sons. p. 257.
- MacLeod, Jessie. "William (Billy) Lee". mountvernon.org. George Washington's Mount Vernon: The Mount Vernon Ladies' Association.
- Marx, Rudolph (August 1955). "A Medical Profile Of George Washington". American Heritage. Vol. 6, no. 5. American Heritage Publishing.
- Mooney, James L., ed. (November 1983). Dictionary of American Naval Fighting Ships. Vol. 6. Defense Dept., Navy, Naval History Division. ISBN 0-16-002030-1.
- Mount Rushmore National Memorial South Dakota (PDF). National Park Service. 1965.
- "People". National Park Service U.S. Department of the Interior. October 25, 2017.
- "Presidential Library History". archives.org. National Archives. August 15, 2016.
- Schlossberg, David, ed. (2012). Infections of the Head and Neck. Springer Science & Business Media. p. 135. ISBN 9781461246404.
- Smith, Craig Bruce. "Status of Slaves in Washington's Will". mountvernon.org. Brandeis University: The Mount Vernon Ladies' Association.
- "Ten Facts About Washington & Slavery". mountvernon.org. The Mount Vernon Ladies' Association.
- Wallenborn, White McKenzie, M.D. (1999). "George Washington's Terminal Illness: A Modern Medical Analysis of the Last Illness and Death of George Washington". The Papers of George Washington. University of Virginia. Archived from the original on 2018-09-24.
- "Washington Monument History & Culture". April 16, 2018.
- Wineberger, James Albert (1858). The tomb of Washington at Mount Vernon Embracing a full and accurate description of Mount Vernon, as well as of the birthplace, genealogy, character, marriage, and last illness of Washington. Washington, T. McGill.

== Links ==
- Mount Rushmore from the Air Viewed 07-01-2019
- The Fred W. Smith National Library for the Study of George Washington Virtual Tour Viewed 07-01-2019
- Washington Monument, Washington [HD] Viewed 07-01-2019
