= Listed buildings in Kentmere =

Kentmere is a civil parish in Westmorland and Furness, Cumbria, England. It contains 14 listed buildings that are recorded in the National Heritage List for England. Of these, one is listed at Grade II*, the middle of the three grades, and the others are at Grade II, the lowest grade. The parish is in the Lake District National Park and is almost completely rural, the only significant settlement being the village of Kentmere. Almost all the listed buildings are farmhouses and farm buildings, the others being a tower house a church, and a limekiln.

== Key ==
Grade	Criteria
II*	Particularly important buildings of more than special interest
II	Buildings of national importance and special interest

== Buildings ==
Name and location	Photograph	Date	Notes	Grade
Kentmere Hall and barn 54.43056°N 2.84772°W		14th century	A tower house with an attached farmhouse, and a barn with a shippon and hay loft. They are in stone, the farmhouse is rendered, and the roofs are in green slate. The tower has slit openings and an inserted medieval window, and the ground floor is vaulted. The farmhouse has two storeys, and contains 20th-century doors and windows. There is a passage door with a pointed head and chamfered jambs, and a small mullioned window.	II*
St Cuthbert's Church; 54.42946°N 2.83961°W		16th century	The church was restored in 1866 and the tower was rebuilt. The church is in roughcast stone with a slate roof, and consists of a nave, a south porch, a chancel and a west tower. The tower has two stages, and contains a single lancet window, round-headed bell openings, and a saddleback roof with coping and finials. The east window has four lights, a segmental head, and mullions.	II
Longhouses Farmhouse and shippon 54.42004°N 2.83512°W	—	17th century or earlier	The farmhouse and attached shippon and hay loft are in stone with green slate roofs. The house has a stone ridge, two storeys, three irregular bays, and a gabled stone porch. In each floor is a fixed window, and the other windows are horizontally-sliding sashes. Inside the farmhouse is an inglenook. The shippon and hayloft to the left are higher, and have through-stones and a continuous slate canopy.	II
Scales Farmhouse and barn 54.44142°N 2.83519°W	—	Late 17th century or earlier	The farmhouse and bank barn are in stone with a Westmorland slate roof. The house has two storeys and three bays. On the front is a gabled porch, and the windows are casements. At the rear is a 20th-century dormer. The barn to the right is taller and has various openings.	II
Brockstones Farmhouse; 54.44030°N 2.82412°W	—	Late 17th century (probable)	The farmhouse is roughcast and has a green slate roof with a stone ridge, and a crow-stepped gable on the right. There are two storeys, two bays, and an open gabled porch. The ground floor windows are 20th-century casements, and in the upper floor are horizontally-sliding sash windows.	II
Overend Farmhouse; 54.44445°N 2.82836°W	—	Late 17th century (probable)	The farmhouse was later extended to the rear. It is roughcast with a green slate roof, two storeys and three bays. On the front is a pitched slate porch, and the windows are 19th-century casements. To the left is a small lean-to with a crow-stepped gable.	II
Rookhowe Farmhouse and outbuildings 54.43287°N 2.83534°W		Late 17th or early 18th century	The buildings are in stone, the farmhouse is roughcast, and the roofs are in green slate with a stone ridge. The house has two storeys and three bays. There is a gabled porch containing stone benches, and most of the windows are casements. Attached to the house is a stable with a hay loft above and a byre, and at right angles are a byre with a hayloft and a barn with a threshing floor.	II
Barn south of Brockstones Farmhouse; 54.44010°N 2.82414°W	—	18th century (probable)	An aisle was added to the barn later. It is in stone, the roof facing the farmhouse is in green slate, on the other side it is corrugated asbestos, and it has blue glazed ridge tiles. There are five bays, and wagon doors on the front and the rear.	II
Barn southwest of Brockstones Farmhouse; 54.44006°N 2.82448°W	—	18th century (probable)	The barn is in stone and has a green slate roof with a stone ridge. It contains a single door in the ground floor and a hay loft door above.	II
Brow Top Farmhouse; 54.43104°N 2.83791°W	—	18th century	The farmhouse is in slate rubble, and has a green slate roof. There are two storeys and three bays. In the centre is a gabled porch with a round-arched opening, and containing slate benches. In the ground floor are a fixed window and a sash window, and in the upper floor the windows are 20th-century casements.	II
Limekiln; 54.43137°N 2.84873°W	—	18th century (possible)	The limekiln is in stone and is built into the side of a hill. It has a square plan, an arched opening, and a blocked chimney.	II
Barn south of Overend Farmhouse; 54.44423°N 2.82830°W	—	18th century (probable)	A stone barn with a green slate roof and crow-stepped gables. It has an L-shaped plan.	II
Barn southwest of Overend Farmhouse; 54.44435°N 2.82855°W	—	18th century (probable)	The barn is in stone with a green slate roof. It has crow-stepped gables.	II
Shippon and hay barn, Kentmere Hall; 54.43052°N 2.84738°W	—	19th century (probable)	The farm building is in stone with through-stones, a continuous hood mould, and a green slate roof with a stone ridge. It contains four doors in the ground floor and one above, all with voussoirs.	II
