= John Dickenson (author) =

English author

John Dickenson (c. 1570–1636) was an English author, known as a romance-writer. He was a follower in the school of John Lyly and Robert Greene. He worked for a time in the Low Countries, and Germany. Employed by George Gilpin and Ralph Winwood, he may have been a spy, and certainly was an agent of the government on the ground at the time of the War of the Jülich succession of 1610. He was employed on further missions, in Poland and Scandinavia.

== Works ==
He was the author of:

- Deorum Consessus, siue Apollinis ac Mineruæ querela, &c., 1591.
- Arisbas, Euphues amidst his Slumbers, or Cupids Journey to Hell, &c., 1594, dedicated ‘To the right worshipfull Maister Edward Dyer, Esquire.’
- Greene in Conceipt. New raised from his graue to Write the Tragique Historie of Faire Valeria of London, &c., 1598, with a woodcut on the title-page representing Robert Greene in his shroud, writing at a table.
- The Shepheardes Complaint; a passionate Eclogue, written in English Hexameters: Wherevnto are annexed other Conceits, &c., n. d. (circ. 1594). Three short poems from this work are included in England's Helicon, 1600.
- Specvlum Tragicvm, Regvm, Principvm & Magnatvm superioris sæculi celebriorum ruinas exitusque calamitosos breviter complectens, &c., Delft, 1601, reprinted in 1602, 1603, and 1605.
- Miscellanea ex Historiis Anglicanis concinnata, &c., Leyden, 1606.

According to recent scholarship, Dickenson translated from French Louis Leroy's edition of Aristotle's Politics in 1598, as Aristotles Politiques.

== Notes ==
Attribution

This article incorporates text from a publication now in the public domain: "Dickenson, John". Dictionary of National Biography. London: Smith, Elder & Co. 1885–1900.
