= Wild Boar of Westmorland =

Legend of Windermere, England

The Wild Boar of Westmorland is a legend concerning Richard de Gilpin and the villagers and pilgrims visiting the ruins of the Holy Cross at Plumgarths, and the Chapel of the Blessed Virgin on St. Mary's Isle on Windermere.

== Legendary account ==
The story goes that in the reign of King John (1199–1216) a ferocious wild boar infested the forest between Kendal and Windermere; it had its den in the neighbourhood of the well-known Scout Scar. Tales of the monster’s malignant and unwonted ferocity were circulated far and wide; pilgrims paid their devotions at the Holy Cross before embarking upon the perilous journey through Crook and over Cleabarrow, the creature's main haunt. It is said that "inhabitants (of the local villages) were never safe from its attacks, and that pilgrims...shuddered with fear".

Richard De Gylpin determined to free them from these attacks, and tracked the monster through the forest. After a dramatic fight he slew the animal on the spot of the Wild Boar Inn, on the banks of the little stream, ever since known as the Gilpin. After these brave exploits Richard de Gilpin changed his family crest to include a black boar on a gold background. He was rewarded with the lordship of the manor of Kentmere by the Baron of Kendal for his exploits. The event was immortalised in a song known as the Minstrels of Winandermere (see Gilpin family history for lyrics).

== George Carleton's version ==
George Carleton, Bishop of Chichester (1619–28), wrote a life of Richard's descendant the famous Bernard Gilpin, in it he said that Richard "slew a wild boar raging in the neighbouring mountains like the boar of Erymanthus, brought great damage upon the country people," and was as a reward for his services given the manor of Kentmere by the then Baron of Kendal.
