= Bernard Gilpin =

Oxford theologian

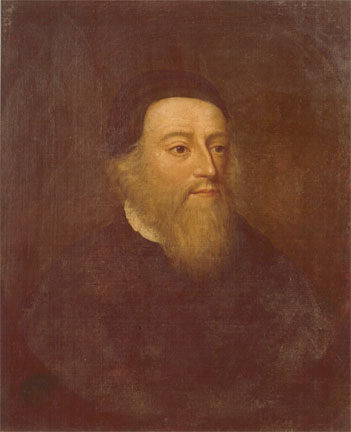
Mid seventeenth century portrait of Bernard Gilpin, the property of his family

Bernard Gilpin (1517 – 4 March 1583), was an Oxford theologian and then an influential clergyman in the emerging Church of England spanning the reigns of Henry VIII, Edward VI, Jane, Mary and Elizabeth I. He was known as the 'Apostle of the North' for his work in the wilds of northern England.

His theological position was not in accord with any of the religious parties of his age. He initially backed transubstantiation at Oxford under Henry, but was not satisfied with the Elizabethan settlement, had great respect for the Church Fathers, and was with difficulty induced to subscribe in 1571.

The views of Edwin Sandys, Archbishop of York on the Eucharist horrified him; but on the other hand the Puritans had some hope of his support and he maintained friendly relations with the Protestant Thomas Lever and James Pilkington (Bishop of Durham from 1561) and Thomas Lever.

== Family ==
Bernard Gilpin descended from a Westmorland family with a pedigree back to Richard de Gylpyn in about 1206. His parents were Edwin and Margaret (née Layton), the latter being niece of Cuthbert Tunstall, Bishop of London and then of Durham, and executor of Henry VIII's estate. George Gilpin was Bernard's elder brother.

== Life ==
=== Early life ===
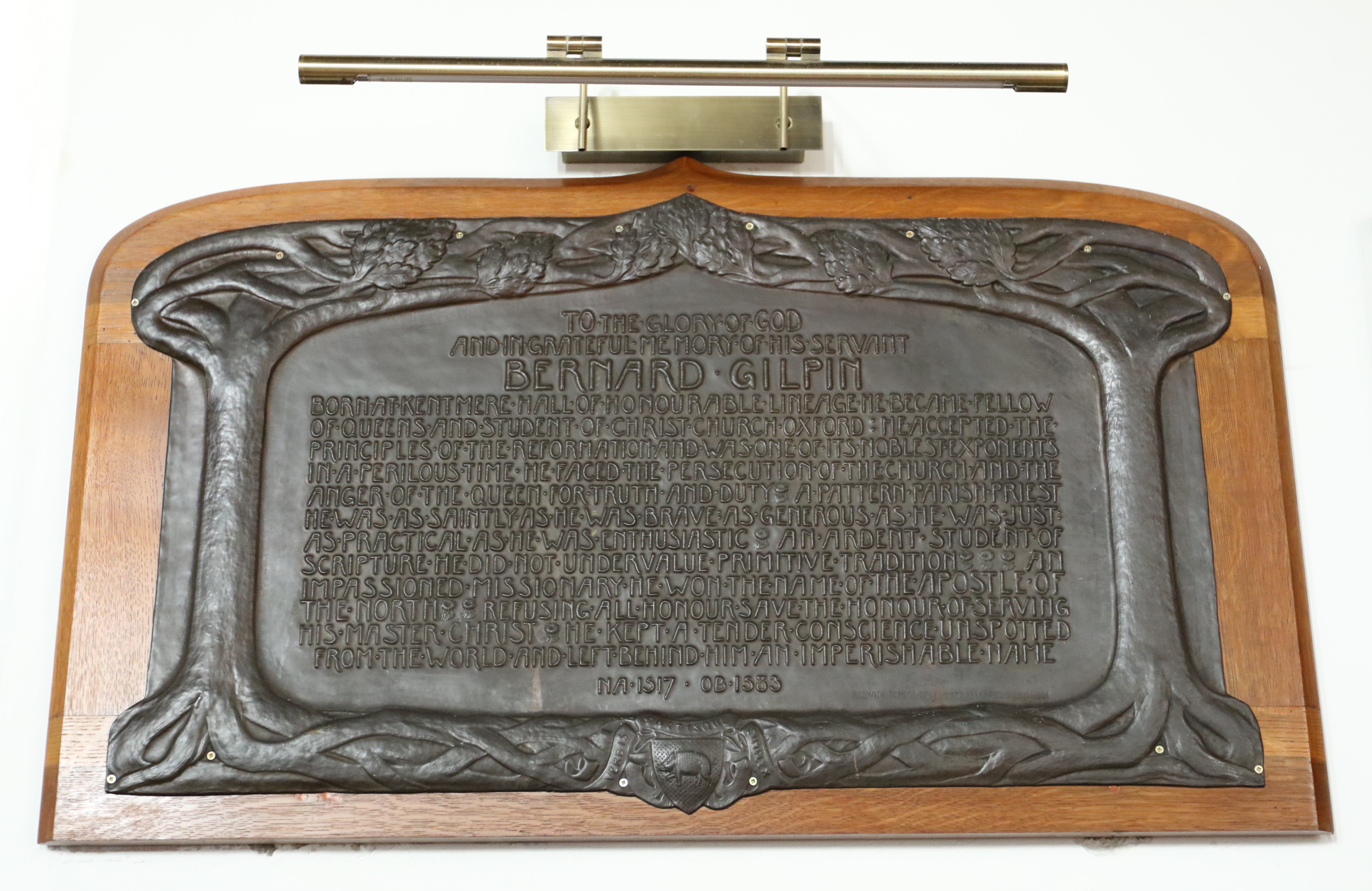
Memorial of 1901 by the Keswick School of Industrial Art in St. Cuthbert's Church, Kentmere

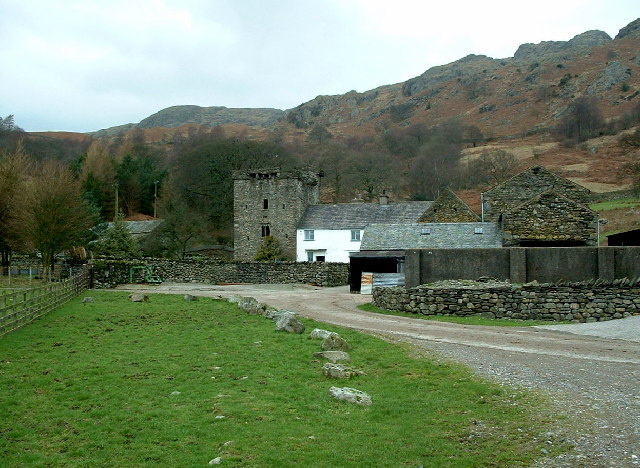
Kentmere Hall, birthplace and childhood home of Bernard Gilpin.

He was born at Kentmere Hall, and grew up in the Kentmere valley; the parish church of St Cuthbert is today little changed from mid seventeenth century drawings, and its churchyard contains a yew tree known to Gilpin, being certified over 1,000 years old. He is recorded to have entered Lancaster Royal Grammar School in the 1530s

=== Oxford ===
He entered Queen's College Oxford in 1533. He graduated Bachelor of Arts (B.A.) in 1540, Master of Arts (M.A.) in 1542 and Bachelor of Divinity (B.D.) in 1549. He was elected fellow of Queen's and ordained in 1542, though he later declined an offer of that college's provostship in 1561.

Subsequently he was elected Student of Christ Church. He was a diligent student of the writings of Erasmus but whilst still at Oxford initially adhered to the conservative side. He defended the doctrines of the church against those who would later become victims of the Marian Persecutions, and in particular John Hooper, one of the first four Marian Martyrs.

Pietro Martire Vermigli, a leading Italian Reformer, was appointed to the chair of Divinity of Oxford and in the course of his Lectures on 1st Corinthians attacked the "Romish doctrine" of transubstantiation. In the subsequent debate one of his opponents was Gilpin, along with Doctors Tresham, Chedsey and Morgan.

=== Edward and Mary ===
In November 1552 he was presented to the vicarage of Norton, in the diocese of Durham. Persons appointed to livings in Royal patronage at that time were required to preach before the King, that there might be an opportunity of ascertaining their orthodoxy. Accordingly, on the first Sunday after Epiphany 1553 Gilpin went to Greenwich to preach in the Royal presence. His sermon on sacrilege is extant and displays the high ideal he had formed of the clerical office.

As a result of his sermon at Greenwich Gilpin obtained a licence, through William Cecil, as a general preacher throughout the kingdom as long as the King lived. This was one of only twenty-two or twenty-three granted during the reign of Edward VI. His contemporary John Knox, later a Presbyterian, was another. He was also a clergyman in the Diocese of Durham, at Berwick-upon-Tweed and Newcastle, between 1549 and 1554. On Mary's accession in 1553 he went abroad to pursue his theological investigations at Leuven, Antwerp and Paris; and from a letter dated 1554, we get a glimpse of the quiet student rejoicing in an "excellent library belonging to a monastery of Minorites."

=== Rector of Houghton-le-Spring ===
==== Attacks ====
Returning to England towards the close of Queen Mary's reign, he was invested in 1556 by his mother's uncle, Cuthbert Tunstall, bishop of Durham, with the archdeaconry of Durham, to which the rectory of Easington was annexed. He gained enemies from his wide-ranging attacks on the vices of his time, especially those of the clergy, and he was formally brought before the bishop on a charge consisting of thirteen articles. Tunstall, however, not only dismissed the case in 1557, but also presented Gilpin with the rich living of Houghton-le-Spring; and when the accusation was again brought forward, he again protected him.

Enraged at this defeat, Gilpin's enemies laid their complaint before Edmund Bonner, bishop of London, who secured a royal warrant for his apprehension. Upon this Gilpin prepared for martyrdom and ordered his house-steward to provide him with a long garment to appear more dignified if he was burned at the stake. He then set out for London but broke his leg on the journey, which delayed his arrival until Queen Mary was dead and her Protestant half-sister Elizabeth on the throne.

==== Hospitality ====
He at once returned to Houghton-le-Spring, where he continued to labour in a ceaseless round of benevolent activity. When the bishop of Carlisle was deprived in 1560 for refusing to renounce his allegiance to the Pope, Gilpin was offered that see but declined it. In June that year he entertained Cecil and Dr Nicholas Wotton on their way to Edinburgh.

His hospitable manner of living was the admiration of all. His living was a comparatively rich one, including a house better than many bishops' palaces, and his position was that of a clerical magnate. In his household he spent every fortnight forty bushels of corn, twenty bushels of malt and an ox, besides a proportional quantity of other kinds of provisions. Strangers and travellers found a ready reception; and even their horses were treated with so much care that it was humorously said that, if one were turned loose in any part of the country, it would immediately make its way to the rector of Houghton.

==== Parish and beyond ====
Every Sunday from Michaelmas till Easter was a public day with Gilpin. For the reception of his parishioners he had three tables well covered, one for gentlemen, the second for husbandmen, the third for day-laborers; and this piece of hospitality he never omitted, even when losses or scarcity made its continuance difficult. Among his parishioners he was looked up to as a judge, and did great service in preventing lawsuits amongst them. If an industrious man suffered a loss, he delighted to make it good; if the harvest was bad, he was liberal in the remission of tithes.

He built and endowed a grammar-school at a cost of upwards of £500, educated and maintained a large number of poor children at his own charge, and provided the more promising pupils with means of studying at the universities. So many young people flocked to his school that there was not accommodation for them in Houghton, and he had to fit up part of his house as a boarding establishment. One of his pupils at the school (which continues today as Kepier School) was George Carleton, Bishop of Chichester (1619–1628).

Grieved at the ignorance and superstition which the remissness of the clergy permitted to flourish in the neighbouring parishes, he used every year to visit the most neglected parts of Northumberland, Yorkshire, Cheshire, Westmorland and Cumberland and therefore continually had to pay for an assistant to tend to his own flock back in Houghton.

==== Glove ====
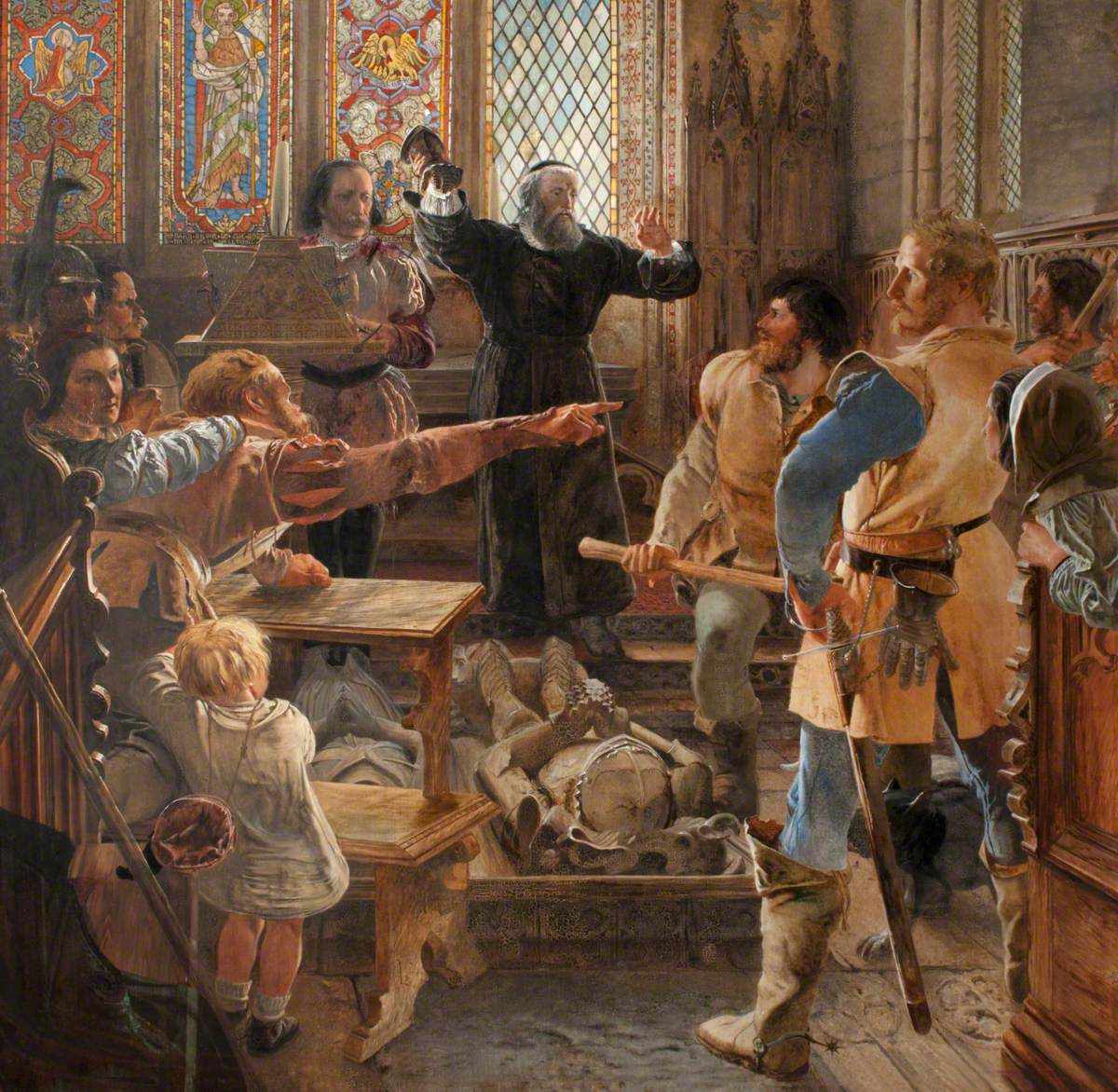
Bernard Gilpin Making Peace among the Borders, Takes Down the Glove in Rothbury Church, by William Bell Scott, 1859

The boldness which he could display at need is well illustrated by his action in regard to duelling. Finding one day a challenge-glove stuck up on the door of a church where he was to preach, he took it down with his own hand, and proceeded to the pulpit to inveigh against the unchristian custom. This is how Sir Walter Scott describes it in his preface letter to The Death of the Laird's Jock in August 1831.

Bernard Gilpin, the apostle of the north, the first who undertook to preach the Protestant doctrines to the Border dalesmen, was surprised, on entering one of their churches, to see a gauntlet or mail-glove hanging above the altar. Upon enquiring the meaning of a symbol so indecorous being displayed in that sacred place, he was informed by the clerk that the glove was that of a famous swordsman, who hung it there as an emblem of a general challenge and gage of battle, to any who should dare to take the fatal token down. Reach it to me, said the reverend churchman. The clerk and sexton equally declined the perilous office, and the good Bernard Gilpin was obliged to remove the glove with his own hands, desiring those who were present to inform the champion that he, and no other, had possessed himself of the gage of defiance. But the champion was as much ashamed to face Bernard Gilpin as the officials of the church had been to displace his pledge of combat.

==== Death ====
Bernard Gilpin died on 4 March 1583, several weeks after an incident in Durham Market-place when an ox ran at him and injured him severely. His tomb is in Houghton-le-Spring Church.

== Reception ==
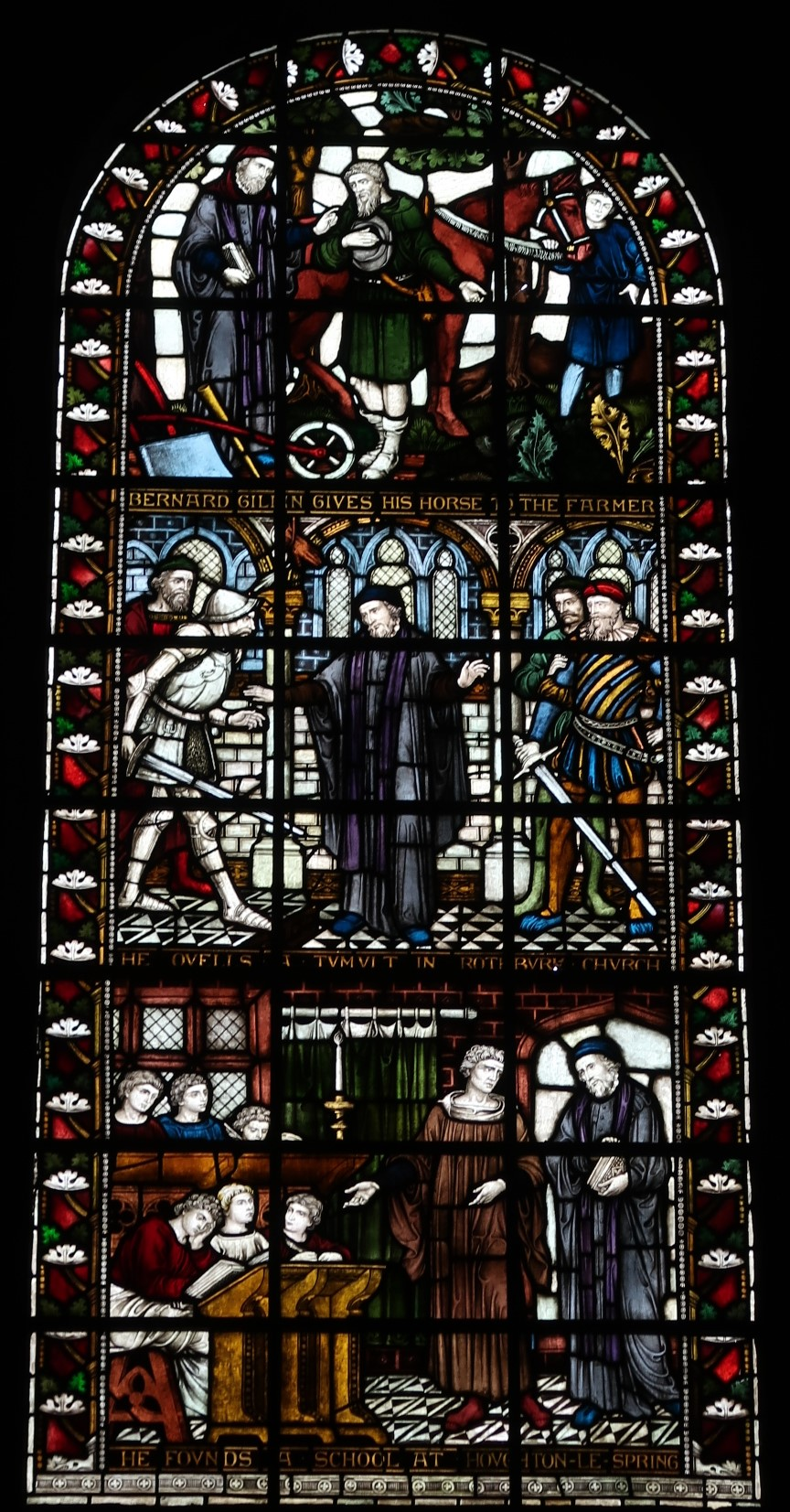
Bernard Gilpin window in Durham Cathedral, England

Carleton published his Vita Bernardi Gilpini in 1628. This was published in English in 1638 as The Life of Bernard Gilpin along with the text of the Sermon preached before Edward VI in 1552. The Reverend C. S. Collingwood's Memoirs of Bernard Gilpin was published in 1884, whilst Gilpin also appears in stained glass in the Anglican cathedrals in Durham and Liverpool.

In 1888 Arthur Wollaston Hutton asked William Ewart Gladstone "in what sense he understood the existence of a spiritual continuity between the ancient Catholic Church and the existing Church of England" and received a letter in reply stating that before the Reformation and "before Anglicanism had a recognised existence as a form of thought" he should look for it mainly in men like John Colet and after that in men like Gilpin. Hutton mentioned this in his introduction to S. R. Maitland's 1899 Essays on the Reformation, adding:

Although this hardly involves continuity in the sense in which the question was asked, the conjunction of these two names strikes me as particularly happy : for, while both of them were Catholic priests by ordination, neither of them could he described as Roman in their sympathies; indeed, it would be truer to say of both that their tone of mind, as ecclesiastics and as educationists, was more what would now he reckoned as Anglican.

And the name of Bernard Gilpin suggests the lines on which a true, popular history of the Reformation might be written. Born in 1517 and dying in 1583, ordained in the reign of Henry VIII, selected to preach before Edward VI, presented to an important benefice in the north of England in the reign of Mary, and holding it until his death, he might seem an obvious butt for satire on the laxity of conscience in those who conformed throughout the Reformation period. But a study of his life would tell a very different tale, and show a man of deep Christian convictions and unimpeachable honesty, deservedly held in honour, not only by the conforming priests of whom he was one, and who formed of course the great majority of the clergy of the Church of England during the early years of Elizabeth's reign, but also by the new men, ordained under the new regime.

An historical romance, based on the life of Bernard Gilpin, concerning whom a good deal is known, and illustrated, by a competent historical scholar, with accurately stated incidents, in which the religious life of the Reformation period should be depicted, as graphically as Newman in Callista, or Pater in Marius the Epicurean, deincted the growth of Christian ideas in the early centuries of our era – such a book would certainly go far to fill the vacant place to which at the outset I referred; and might, in the guise of fiction, obtain a wide circulation and popular acceptance, doing thus a great service to the cause of historical truth.
