= Arthur Wollaston Hutton =

British clergyman (1848–1912)

Arthur Wollaston Hutton (5 September 1848 Spridlington, Lincolnshire – 25 March 1912 Blackheath) was an English clergyman and author.

== Biography ==
Hutton was born in Spridlington. He was a scholar of Exeter College, Oxford. He took orders in the Church of England in 1872, but under Newman's influence became a Roman Catholic, and from 1876-83 was a member of the Edgbaston Oratorian community. He changed his views, however: he married and renounced Roman Catholicism, and became known as an agnostic and free thinker.

For some years Hutton was librarian at the National Liberal Club in London, but in 1898 he was readmitted to the English Church, and from 1903 to his death he was rector of Bow Church, London. His absolute sincerity and great intellectual ability were recognized by all. He was the author of a Life of Manning (1892). On his deathbed he asked to be received back into the Catholic Church.

Hutton was an anti-vaccinationist and advocated the repeal of compulsory laws relating to it. He authored The Vaccination Question, in 1895. The book was negatively reviewed in The British Medical Journal which commented that "this violent polemic against vaccination is not written in a scientific spirit at all: on the contrary, we find here all the old statements used of late years, and refuted over and over again, together with some startling new ones, while the main body of evidence in the favour of vaccination is utterly ignored."

== Selected publications ==
- The Anglican Ministry (1879)
- Cardinal Manning (1894)
- Life of Manning (1892)
- The Vaccination Question (1895)
