= Kentmere =

Village and civil parish in Cumbria, England

Coordinates: 54.429°N 2.840°W

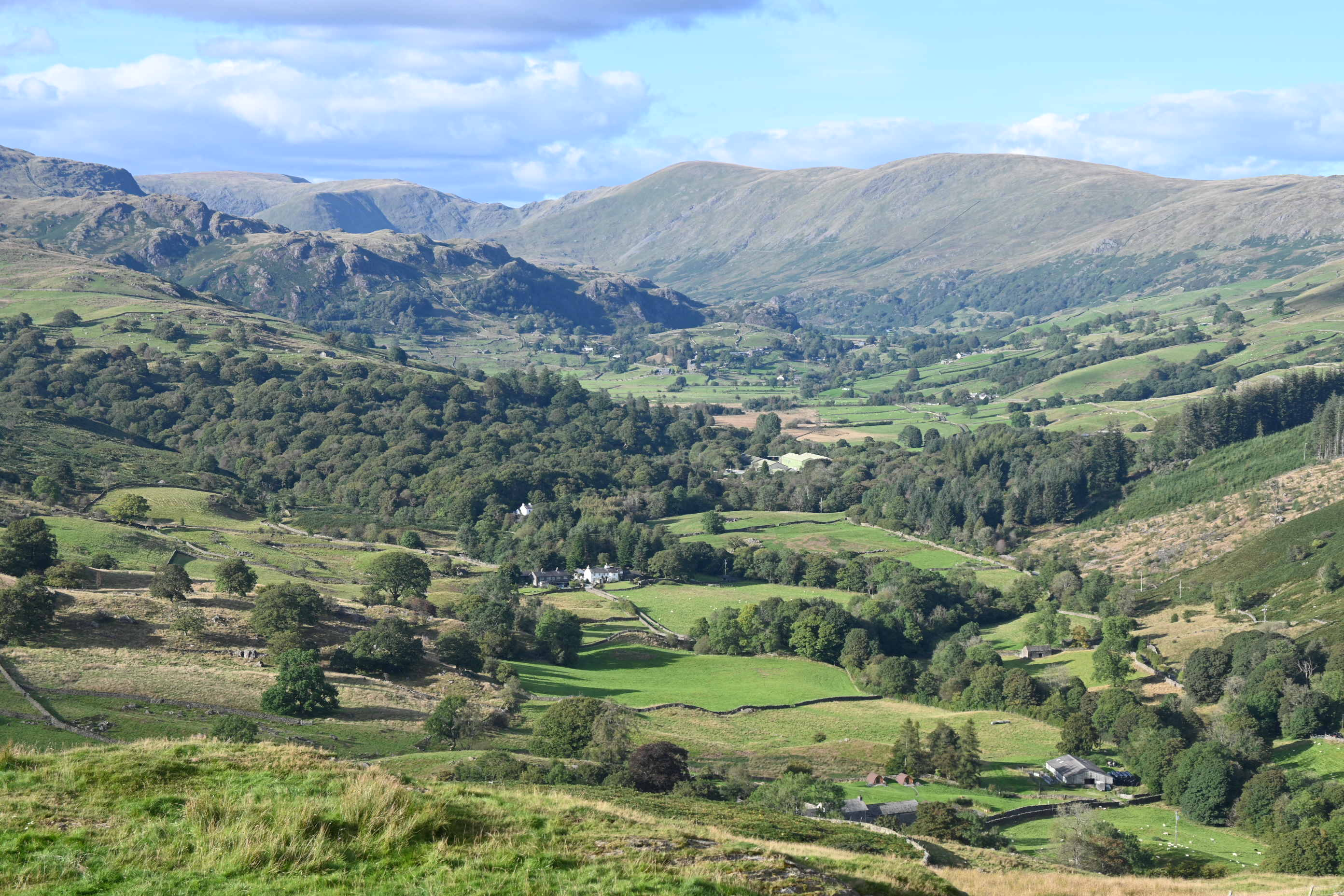
- Looking north up Kentmere from High Knott

- Location in South Lakeland Location within Cumbria
- Population: 159 (2011)
- OS grid reference: NY4504
- Civil parish: Kentmere
- Unitary authority: Westmorland and Furness
- Ceremonial county: Cumbria
- Region: North West
- Country: England
- Sovereign state: United Kingdom
- Post town: KENDAL
- Postcode district: LA8
- Dialling code: 01539
- Police: Cumbria
- Fire: Cumbria
- Ambulance: North West
- UK Parliament: Westmorland and Lonsdale

Kentmere is a valley, village and civil parish in the Lake District National Park, a few miles from Kendal in the Westmorland and Furness district of Cumbria, England. Historically in Westmorland, at the 2011 census Kentmere had a population of 159. The current lord of the manor is American philanthropist Terry A. Perkins.

== Geography ==
The narrow valley spans about 3 miles (4.8 km) in length and begins with a bowl of hills known as the Kentmere Round; a horseshoe of high fells which surrounds Kentmere Reservoir. The River Kent, which gives Kendal its name, begins from Hall Cove, a corrie at the head of the valley, before flowing through the reservoir. Access to this part of the valley is available via the Roman High Street, over Nan Bield Pass, from Troutbeck over Garburn Pass (Bridleway only. No motor vehicles), or along an old bridleway up from the village. The valley is sandwiched between Troutbeck on the west side and Longsleddale on the east. It can be reached by road only by travelling through the village of Staveley, which sits at its mouth where the river meets the Gowan Beck coming in from Ings. A walk described by Wainwright in his Far Eastern Fells series as the Kentmere Round involves an all-inclusive round trip of 12 miles (19 km). In the past there were drove roads up over the horseshoe in the north to the village of Mardale which is now under the water of the Haweswater Reservoir. In the past it was a tradition of the valley's inhabitants to travel from Kentmere to Mardale village church as part of the Easter Sunday celebrations.

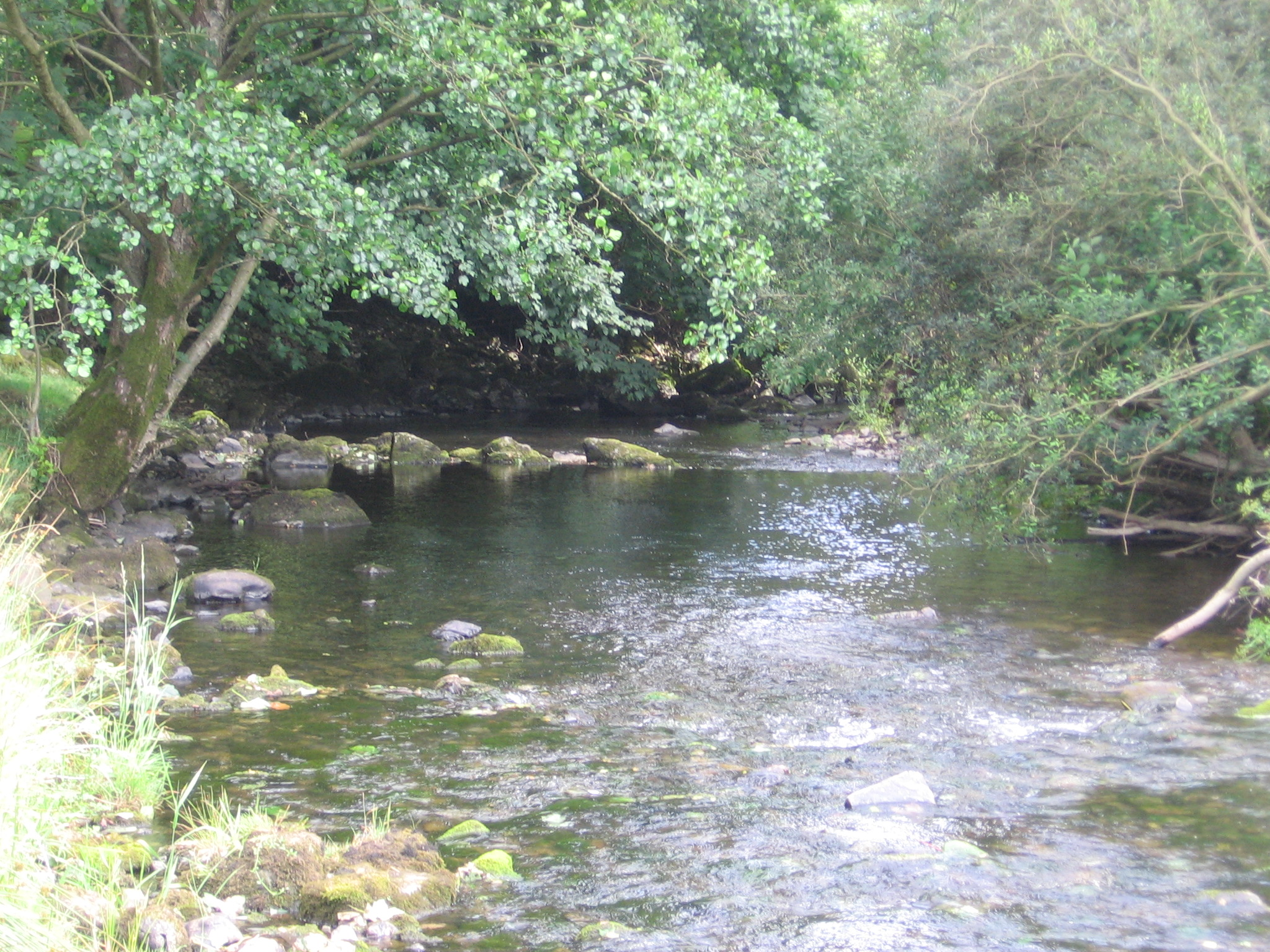
River Kent

The River Kent begins above the reservoir in the heights of Bleathwaite Crag. It collects beneath Kentmere Common in the reservoir which was built in 1848 to control the flow of water to the lower pastures. Lingmell Gill also feeds into the reservoir. Beside the reservoir sits a disused quarry and a cottage formerly used for maintenance of the river. The river opens out into a transitory lake called Kentmere Tarn just south of the confluence with Hall Gill. The lake has at times in the past completely disappeared into marshland and in 1840 it was purposely drained to provide reclaimed farm land, but in the past 100 years the "mere" has reappeared again. It is currently 1 mile in length. An archaeological excavation there uncovered an 'extended' log boat dated to c. 1300 AD (D.M. Wilson, A Medieval Boat from Kentmere, Westmorland, in Medieval Archaeology (1966) 10. 81–88). Other tributaries within the valley include Ullstone Gill, Nunnery Beck, Nuttera Beck, Park Beck and Hall Beck. A waterfall known as Force Jump is situated just north of the village, and there are two bridges at the Staveley end of the valley. The first is called Barley Bridge and includes a dramatic weir. The second straddles the Kent further up the valley and is known as Scrogg's Bridge.

A little further down the valley is the village of Kentmere, which includes Kentmere Hall and the church of St Cuthbert's. The parish of Kentmere is divided into four quarters:

- Kentmere Common
- Green Quarter
- Hallow Bank
- Crag Quarter

Over Staveley and Hugill are also situated within the Kent valley, along with the small settlements of Elfhowe and Browfoot.

Near Kentmere Hall stands the "Brock Stone" or Badger Rock, a large free-standing rhyolite boulder. It is one of many challenges popular with climbers in the area. It is said that: "Kentmere valley has the greatest number of recorded [climbing] problems in the Lake District (over 125)"

The main rocks and minerals to be found in the valley are green slate and granite. There has been some record of opal being found too though it has never been mined. Much of the local stone has been used since pre-history as the raw material for field boundaries using a local technique known as dry stone walling. Just below the reservoir is a Geological Conservation Review site known as Jumb Quarry. The site is significant due to its volcanic rock which displays "bird's-eye tuffs", which contain lapilli (fragments of lava that erupted from a volcanic centre and probably fell into standing bodies of water). The lapilli are believed to have been spherical originally, but were squashed into elliptical shapes as a result of intense pressure during the formation of the Caledonian Mountains.

== Early human history ==
The valley has evidence of habitation going back to roughly 4000 BC, when the valley and surrounding hillsides were almost entirely covered with forest. A major archaeological research project conducted in the valley by a local archaeology group between 1983 and 1999 surveyed and recorded hundreds of archaeological features, as well as excavating two sites – a (radiocarbon dated) pre-Viking and Viking Age upland settlement at Bryant's Gill, south of Rainsborrow Crag (on private land, not publicly accessible), and part of a medieval platform site and farmstead near Kentmere Hall The results of this survey and excavation project are to be made publicly available via a new Lake District and Cumbrian archaeology website in 2012.

The valley's rich archaeological heritage also includes the remains of at least five large prehistoric compound or curvilinear sites incorporating the remains of round houses, stockyards and more. One of these sites is on a public footpath at Tongue House in the northern part of the valley.

=== Significant sites ===
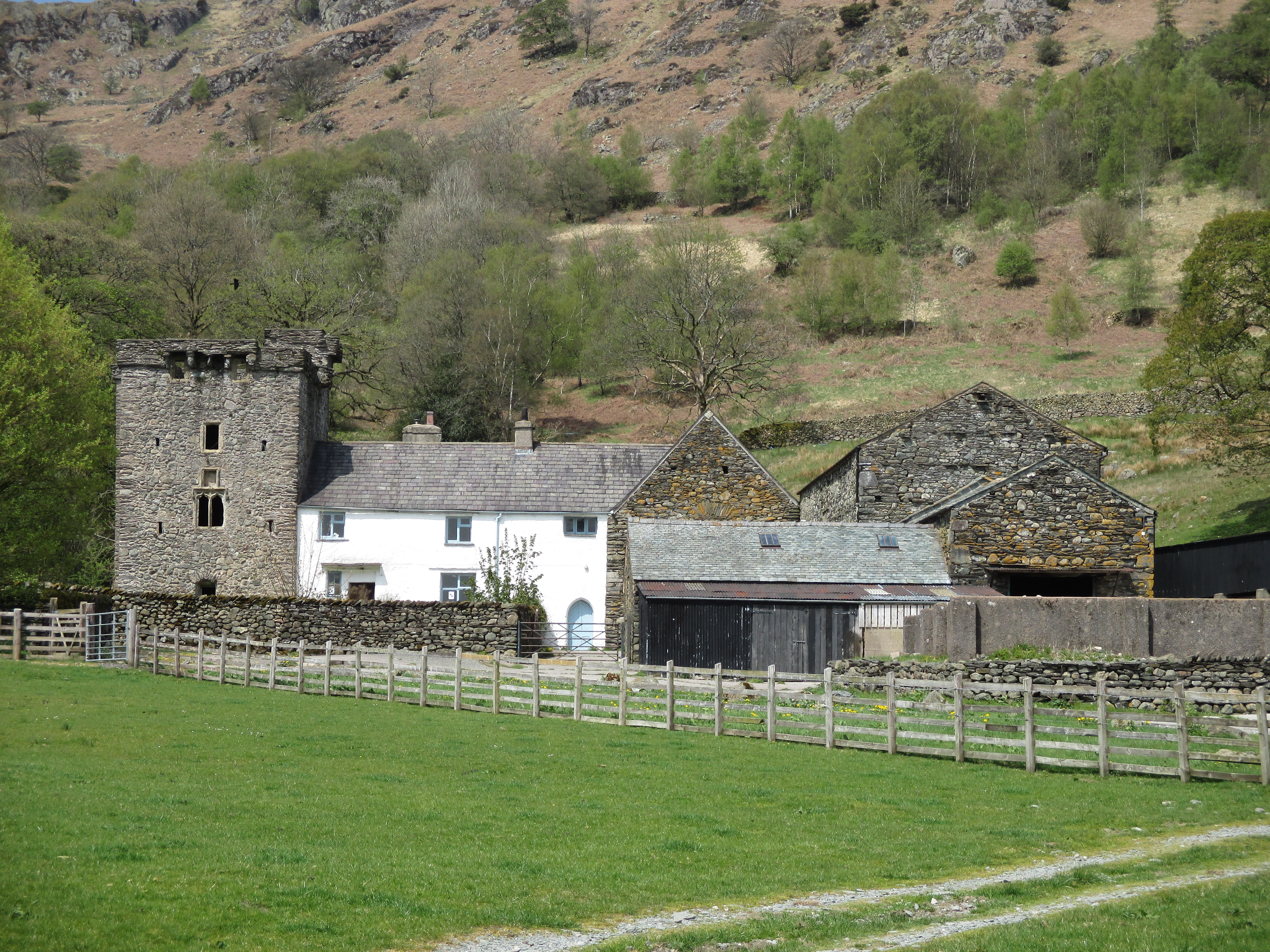
Kentmere Hall

Kentmere Hall is famous for its tower house; a fortification built for status in the 13th – early 14th centuries – ostensibly to guard against raiding parties from Scotland. Similar towers occur elsewhere in Cumbria and other northern English and southern Scottish counties. Kentmere Hall's tower has 5-foot-thick (1.5 m) walls, tunnel-vaulted ceilings, a crenellated roof with turrets and a spiral staircase; all built out of local stone. The farmstead to the east of it shows signs of many building phases and changes, in common with many other significant Lake District valley bottom medieval and post-medieval buildings such as Dalegarth Hall in Eskdale.

The manor, having been handed down to the eldest son, the rest of the valley was divided between the younger sons of the Gilpins for generations. What remains of the original estate is now a farm in possession of a private owner. Other important parts of the manor include Green Quarter on the eastern slopes of the valley where there is a bed and breakfast house, called Maggs Howe, that once was home to a branch of the Gilpin family.

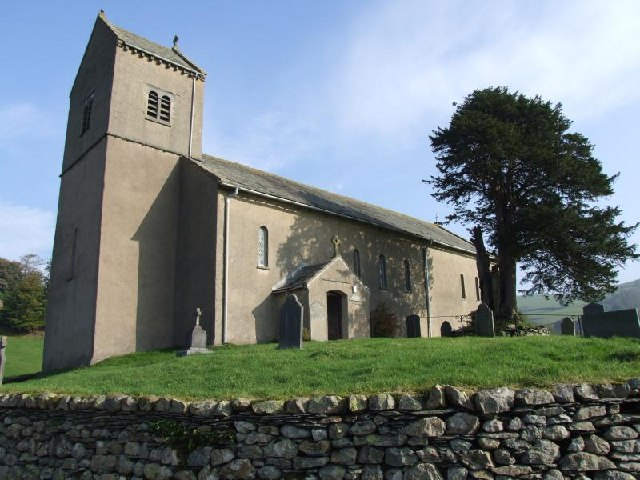
Kentmere Church

St Cuthbert's Church, Kentmere was built to the east of Kentmere Hall. As is often the case with medieval churches, there is an ancient yew tree situated nearby which has been estimated to date back to the time of William I; indicating that worship had been taking place there at an early stage in the village's history. Written records of the chapel do not begin until 1692 making earlier history difficult to establish. A graveyard for the church was dedicated in 1701, and the Lord of the Manor paid the curate "a rate of 2s. levied for every 13s. 4d. paid to the lord of the manor". In 1757 this was supplemented with money paid out of Queen Anne's Bounty roughly £400–800. The chapel was remodelled in the 19th century and again in the 1950s. The roof was of 16th century date, but in 2016 was replaced.

== Industry ==
The valley used to be known for its bobbin mills and for Waterfoot factory which dredged the bottom of the Kentmere Tarn in the 1950s searching for diatomite. A water mill was established by the first Lord of the Manor in 1272. The records state that he had "Liberty granted to erect a mill on the banks of the River Kent at Ulthwaite, upstream of Croft Head" they also stated that the mill was used to cut the sleepers for the Kendal and Windermere Railway in 1860. The mill was restored in the 1970s and is now a pottery studio producing handmade ceramics. Also, at the Staveley end of the valley, is a photographic paper manufactory known as Kentmere Ltd. A fishery is situated beside the reservoir and every year trout and salmon are released into the River Kent for the benefit of anglers because the river's native population has been diminished.

The area has had a history of mining. This appears to have been predominantly for the green slate available in the valley.

=== Mining ===
Official records of mining in the area go back at least as far as 1898. Before that it is likely, due to the particularly craggy nature of the valley, that the local dry stone walls and stone for housing were taken from the slopes around the valley, even as far back as the Bronze Age. There are two main open cast mines in the valley. The first is Jumb Quarry, situated within a few hundred yards of the early settlement at Tongue House, suggesting that the two may have been coexisting in some form or other. However the general proliferation of rock in this part of Kentmere means the early inhabitants may easily have taken their building material from almost anywhere in the valley, so it is by no means certain.

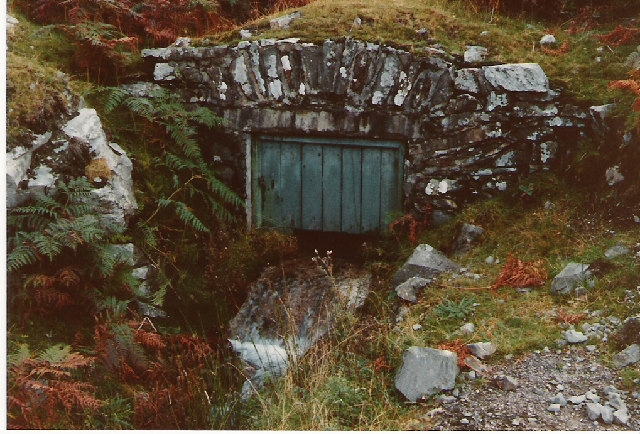
Entrance to underground mine near Browfoot

The second is situated at Steelrigg near Staveley. Both produced green slate.

There were also at least six underground mines in the valley. At the height of production in 1914 Steelrigg employed five men below ground and nine above. The quarry fell out of use in 1923 and 1925 and employed only four men with no active mining listed between 1921 and 1926. Mining was resumed in 1927 and continued until at least 1938.

Jumb quarry was in continuous use throughout the same period, employing 10 men below ground and five above at its height in 1934.

The two quarries changed hands on a number of occasions, with three companies listed in the pre-war period; James Stevenson & Co., Kendal, Tilberthwaite Green Slate Co Ltd., Kendal and Buttermere Green Slate Quarries Ltd., Station Buildings, Keswick. Throughout this time the agent for the quarries was local man J.J. Thomas.

By 1945 a company recorded as being the Kentmere Green Slate Co. Ltd. having its offices in the St. George's Buildings, Blackhall, Kendal owned both sites.

== Literary mentions ==
"Kentmere... This place hath its name from the River Kent, which springs there, and from a mere or lake therein called Kentmere; which river gives name not only to this particular district, but to all the south-west part of this county, called Kendale. It springs about 3 miles (5 km) north from the chapel, and from thence runs southward through Kentmere, Staveley, Strickland, the township of Kendal, by Natland, Helsington, Levins and from thence into the sea. It receives in its course two small rivers, Sprit and Mint. The former springs in Long Sleddale, and runs in at Burneshead. The other springs in Fawcet Forest, and its course meets with Grayrigg Water which springs above the hall, and falls into Kent about a mile above Kendal. Kentmere is bounded on the east by the chapelry of Long Sleddale, on the south by the chapelries of Staveley and Ings, on the west by the top of Garburne Fell, and on the north by Patterdale in the parish of Barton and Mardale in the parish of Shap."

Joseph Nicolson and Richard Burn: The history and antiquities of the counties of Westmorland and Cumberland. 1777. Transcribed by Anne Nichols

== Kentmere families ==
For a valley of its size, Kentmere has produced more than its fair share of famous families. Most notably the Gilpin family who were the main landowners in the village. Secondly the family of Airy who are first officially recorded in the 14th century, although in 1692 a history of the Barony of Kendal recorded that the church of St. Cuthbert, which is known to be of Norman date or earlier, was "reported to have been built by one Airay of this dale" but this may refer to the re-roofing in the mid-16th century. The Aireys still have descendants of the same name in the valley today, although many of them were driven out during the Civil War, when they removed to Lincolnshire. Their notable descendants include George Biddell Airy the astronomer and Henry Airay, who was born in the valley and became Provost of Queen's College, Oxford in 1599. He bequeathed 40 shillings (£2) a year to ensure a monthly sermon was held at St. Cuthbert's. Postman Pat the cartoon character lived in Greendale which is claimed by his creator to be based on Kentmere and the neighbouring valley of Longsleddale.

=== The Gilpin family ===
The valley is famous for the Gilpin family who were given the valley and much surrounding land after an act of bravery by a member of the court of King John. According to legend, around the time of the signing of the Magna Carta Richard de Gilpin, known as "Richard the Rider" accompanied the Baron of Kendal to Runnymede as his secretary because the Baron himself was unable to read or write. After their return, Richard achieved renown for killing the Wild Boar of Westmorland a ferocious animal that had been terrorising the local villages. As a reward for his bravery, the Baron gave him the land in and around Kentmere, about 4,000 acres (16 km²), described as "a breezy tract of pasture land" by the French Chronicler Froissart. From this time onward, the Gilpin's crest included a sable boar on a gold background. Many areas near and surrounding Kentmere still sport the name of Gilpin given to them by descendants of this family.

Richard's achievement and his ancestry were immortalised by minstrels of the period in a song known as "the Minstrels of Winandermere" after Windermere which is less than 10 miles (15 km) from the valley.

The estate of Kentmere was increased during the reign of Henry III by a grant of the Manor of Ulwithwaite to Richard, the grandson of the boar-slayer.

The family later became famous for their alliance with the neighbouring de Bruce family who went on to become ancestors of the Kings of Scotland.

Bernard Gilpin also known as the "Apostle of the North" was a youngest son of the Gilpins of Kentmere Hall during the 16th century, and grew up there. In his adulthood he stayed there on occasion, preaching at the church. Concerning Bernard Gilpin; Thomas Cox states:

""Kontmire or Kentmeire, a small Village, famous only for the Birth of that eminent Person Bernard Gilpin, the Son of Edwin Gilpin, Esq; educated in Queens College, Oxford, where he proceeded Master of Arts, and was made Fellow thereof... This his Eminence in Learning recommended him to be chosen one of the Masters of Christ-Church, when it was first founded for a Dean, Canons, and Students by King Hen. VIIII, but he did not continue long there, his Mother's Uncle, Cuthbert Tunstall, Bishop of Durham, sending him to travel.. Preaching he made his chief Business; and that the Gospel might be both thoroughly believed and practised, he frequently preached as well in the remote Towns as near, insomuch that he was called, The Northern Apostle. His Alms also were so frequent, equal, and constant, that he was called The common Father of the Poor; and because a good Education of poor Children is one of the greatest Charities... he abounded in good Deeds, so he was careful not only to avoid all Evil, but all Suspicions of it, so that he was accounted a Saint by all that knew him, for Enemies he could have none. He died 4 March 1582, in the 66th Year of his Age, and came to his Grave like a Shock of Corn in its Season. He was buried in the Church of Houghton, and by his Will dated Octob. 17, 1582, he left Half his Goods to the Poor of his Parish, and the other Half for Scholars and Students in Oxford. He hath written several Things, but has nothing in print but a Sermon on St. Luke 2. 41, 48, preached before the King and Court at Greenwich on the first Sunday in Epiphany in 1552"

Magna Britannica et Hibernia.Volume 6: Westmorland by Thomas Cox (Vicar of Bromfield, Essex) 45 pages, printed in 1731

Bernard's eldest brother was George Gilpin who was commissioned by Queen Elizabeth I to form an alliance between the Dutch States and the English against the Spanish Armada. He was minister to The Hague during her reign. He carried with him an autographed letter written by the Queen stating:

"Having charged Mr. Gilpin, one of our councillors of State, to deliver this letter, it will not be necessary to authorise him by any other confidence than what is already acquired by a long proof of his capacity and of his fidelity and sincerity, assuring you you may trust in him as in ourselves."

The second brother, William Gilpin, took residence in the mill in 1578 after marrying Elizabeth Washington of Hall Head (the great-great aunt of George Washington).

Kentmere Hall remained in the hands of the Gilpins for 12 generations. It was lost during the English Civil War when Cromwell's troops destroyed the hall leaving only the fortified tower standing. The head of the household at that time left the land in trust to a friend and fled the country. When returning the gentleman's heir was unable to lay hold of the official deeds to the estate and so possession was lost. In 1660 ownership of the hall passed to the Philipson family.

==== "Minstrels of Winandermere" lyrics ====
Bert de Gylpyn drew of Normandie
From Walchelin his gentle blood,
Who haply hears, by Bewley's sea,
The Angevins' bugles in the wood,
His crest, the rebus of his name,
Pineapple-a pine of gold
Was it, his Norman shield,
Sincere, in word and deed, his face extolled.
But Richard having killed the boar
With crested arm an olive shook,
And sable boar on field of or
For impress on his shield he took.
And well he won his honest arms.
And well he knew his Kentmore lands.
He won them not in war's alarms,
Nor dipt in human blood his hands.

==== Lyrics according to William Partridge Gilpin ====
The following lyrics were found by Reverend Charles Farish, whose mother was Elizabeth Gilpin (née Washington). He claimed they dated to the 13th century. However, the style is somewhat affected for the 13th century and everything but the first verse must be regarded with a suspicious eye.

At Crookbeck were his footsteps seen,
The holy pilgrim he affrays;
O waly, waly Kendal Green,
And waly, waly Bowness braes!

Ev'n when they kiss'd St Mary's ground.
Them still their flutt'ring hearts misgave;
They cast an eager glance around,
Mistrusting every foam tusk'd wave.

For the wild boar is raging nigh,
Bark'd are the trees about Boar-stile,
At Underbarrow is his sty,
Oh waly sweet St. Mary's Isle!

But hark at Kendal rebecks sound,
And Bowness Millbecks echo wakes,
In Crookebeck ford he felt the wound,
In death his burning thirst he slakes.

The gallant hero washed his spear,
A tear unhidden left his eye,
His faithful dog was bleeding near,
The river stream'd with mingled dye.

And well he won his honest arms,
And well he won his Kentmere lands;
He won them not in wars alarms,
Nor dipt in human strife his hands...

(note; Charles Farish was a friend of William Wordsworth. In his book Poetical Works vol. 1 a footnote to Guilt and Sorrow; or, Incidents upon Salisbury Plain states that some of its lines were taken "From a short MS. poem read to me when an under-graduate, by my schoolfellow and friend Charles Farish, long since deceased. The verses were by a brother of his, a man of promising genius, who died young."—W. W. 1842 in a statement by the editor of the volume the footnote goes on to say that: "Charles Farish was the author of The Minstrels of Winandermere" as a result there is some debate as to authorship of the song commemorating Richard Gilpin's achievements).

=== Gilpin coat of arms ===
Or, a boar statant sable, langued and tusked gules. Crest: A dexter arm embowed I armour proper, the naked hand grasping a pine branch fesswise vert.

Motto: Dictis Factisque Simplex (Latin; "Honest in Word and Deed").

=== Gilpin family tree ===
- Walcheln De Gyplin or De Gulespin, brother Josceln. (possibly the same as, or descended from Walchelin de Ferrieres, Lord of Saint Hilaire de Ferriers, near Bernay, in Normandy).
- Bert de Guylpyn – Came over from Normandy after 1066 following William the Conqueror.
- Richard de Gylpyn – "Richard the Rider", was granted the estate of Kentmere by the Baron of Kendal 1206 for killing the wild boar.
- Richard II De Gylpyn – Granted by deed, the manor and lands of Ulwithwaite in 1268.
- William de Guylpyn descendant who married the daughter of Thomas Ayray bailiff of Kentmere in 1375.
- Bert (or Richard) de Guylpyn. son of William. Married A. Fleming.
- William de Guylpyn – son of Richard. Married R./Elizabeth Lancaster.
- Richard de Gilpin – grandson of second Richard. Granted additional land by Henry III married Dorothy Thornborough?

- William Gilpin – eldest son of Richard. Captain in the King's army, Killed battle of Bosworth Field 22 August 1485

- Edwin Gilpin – second son of Richard. married Margaret Layton/Laton.

- Eldest son: George Gilpin – minister to The Hague during Queen Elizabeth I's reign.
- Second son: William Gilpin – married Elizabeth Washington, a presumed relative of George Washington.
- Third son: Bernard Gilpin – (the "Apostle of the North") born 1517

- Martin Gilpin – son of William, married Catherine Newby, died 18 December 1629.
- Bernard Gilpin – son of Martin, born in Kentmere Hall 1552, married Dorothy Airey 1572, died 21 April 1636.

- William Gilpin
- Martin Gilpin
- Francis Gilpin
- Samuel Gilpin
- Arthur Gilpin
- Randolph Gilpin
- Allen Gilpin

== See also ==
- Listed buildings in Kentmere
- Staveley, Cumbria
- Bernard Gilpin
- River Kent
- High Street (Lake District)
- Wild Boar of Westmorland
