= Catcheside-Warrington's Tyneside Songs =

Folk songs from the Geordie area of England

Tyneside Songs (or to give it its full title "Tyneside Songs Volume (here the number is stated) with pianoforte accompaniment – by C. E. Catcheside-Warrington – Copyright – (published by) J. G. Windows Ltd., Central Arcade, Newcastle – Printed in England") is a Chapbook of Geordie folk songs consisting of four volumes, first published 1912 and 1913. As it stated on the cover, the publications were compiled and edited by Charles Ernest Catcheside-Warrington.

The books cost initially 2/= (Two Shillings). A further reprint was carried out in 1927, when a price of 3/= (Three Shillings) was printed on the front of the book. Many of this reprint had a red star shaped sticker placed on the front showing that the selling price was in fact 3/6 (Three Shillings and Six Pence). A further reprint was done in the middle 1950s. The later editions were renamed "Album of Tyneside Songs with pianoforte accompaniment".

This collection is important as the songs are all important traditional standards and that they are arranged in the "parlor" performance style representing the classic tradition as opposed to "music hall"

== The publication ==
Charles Ernest Catcheside-Warrington.edited the four volumes of "Tyneside Songs", a series of small booklets each of around 26 pages long, containing mainly well-known songs, by well-known Tyneside composers.

The contents of these volumes now have historical value. In that, we are able to learn of the types of music popular at (and sometimes, many years before) the time of publication.

== Contents ==
(All lyrics/notation available here:* Tyneside Songs-Catcheside Warrington

The volumes and their contents are below :-

vol	page	title	songwriter	tune	comment	note	ref
Tyneside Songs Volume 1 – 26 pages – (1927 edition)
1	5	(Weel May) The Keel Row					
1	6	Geordy, haud the bairn	Joe Wilson				
1	8	Pawnshop Bleezin' – (The) – actually spelt "Paanshop"	J P Robson	X. Y. Z.	Mrs Potter's pawnshop, on The Side, Newcastle, was completely destroyed by fire, in 1849		
1	10	Mally Dunn					
1	12	Blaydon Races	George Ridley				
1	14	Aa Hope Ye'll Be Kind Te Me Dowter					
1	16	Keep yor feet still Geordie hinny	Joe Wilson				
1	18	Cushie Butterfield	George Ridley				
1	20	Last Neet (The New Pollis)					
1	22	Gallowgate Lad – (The)	Joe Wilson				
1	24	Cliffs of Old Tynemouth (The)	David Ross Lietch				
1	25	Haaks's Men (Recitation)					
Tyneside Songs Volume 2 – 26 pages – 1912
2	4	Fire on the Kee – (The)	Edward Corvan	Wor Jocker			
2	8	Me Little Wife at Hyem					
2	10	Row upon the stairs – (The)	Joe Wilson				
2	12	Cullercoats Fish-Lass – (The)	Edward Corvan	Lilie's a Lady			
2	14	Wor Nanny’s a mazer	Thomas "Tommy" Armstrong				
2	16	Pitman's Courtship – (The)	William Mitford	The night before Larry was stretched			
2	18	Cappy – or The Pitman's Dog	William Mitford	Chapter of Donkeys			
2	20	98th (Jack's Listed) (The)					
2	22	Neighbors Doon Belaa (The)	James Weams		the troubles of living in a flat – originally called Neighbors Belaw		
2	24	Sandgate Lass's Lament (The)	H Robson	The Bonny Pit Laddie			
2	26	Oh! Leuk A' The Sowljor					
2	28	Cullercoats Fish-Wife and the Census Man (The)					
Tyneside Songs Volume 3 – 28 pages – 1913
3	4	I Tickled Mary					
3	6	Lass That Leeves Next Door (The)					
3	8	Hi, Canny Man Hoy A Ha'Penny Oot	Harry Nelson				
3	10	Washing-Day – (The)	Thomas Wilson	Nae luck aboot the hoose	actually entitled "Weshin'-day (The)" in this book		
3	12	Oh! Heh Ye Seen Wor Jimmy					
3	14	Wrang Train Agyen					
3	16	The Caller	Edward Corvan				
3	18	Lambton Worm (The)					
3	20	Dinnet Clash the Door (or Divvent)	Joe Wilson	Tramp, tramp			
3	22	Oh! Bonny Scotland					
3	24	Gift O' The Gob (The)					
3	26	Je Ne Comprend Pas (Story)	unknown				
Tyneside Songs Volume 4 – 26 pages – 1913
4	1	Sair Fail'd, Hinney	unknown		Actually titled "Sair Fyel'd Hinny" in the book		
4	2	Newcastle is my native place	unknown	We hae always been provided for			
4	4	Bobby Shaftoe	Traditional				
4	6	Water of Tyne (The)	unknown				
4	8	O the Oak and the Ash and the Bonny Ivy Tree		Godesses *	* The tune is in Sir James Hawkins' "The Dancing Muster," 1650, under this title		
4	10	Oh! I Ha'e Seen The Roses Blaw			alt title – O I hae seen the Roses blaw		
4	12	Elsie Marley	Elsie Marley	to its own tune	An Alewife of Picktree near Chester-le-Street		
4	14	Dance To Thy Daddy	William Watson	The Little Fishy			
4	16	Fiery Clock-fyece (The)	Robert Nunn	The Coal-hole			
4	18	Gyetside Lass (The)					
4	20	Ca' Hawkie through the watter					
4	22	Up The Raw	unknown				
4	24	Dol Li A	unknown				
4	26	Aboot The Bush, Willy	unknown				

== See also ==
- Geordie dialect words
- Charles Ernest Catcheside-Warrington
- Catcheside-Warrington's Tyneside Stories & Recitations
