= Lambton Worm =

Legend from northeast England concerning a knight and a dragon

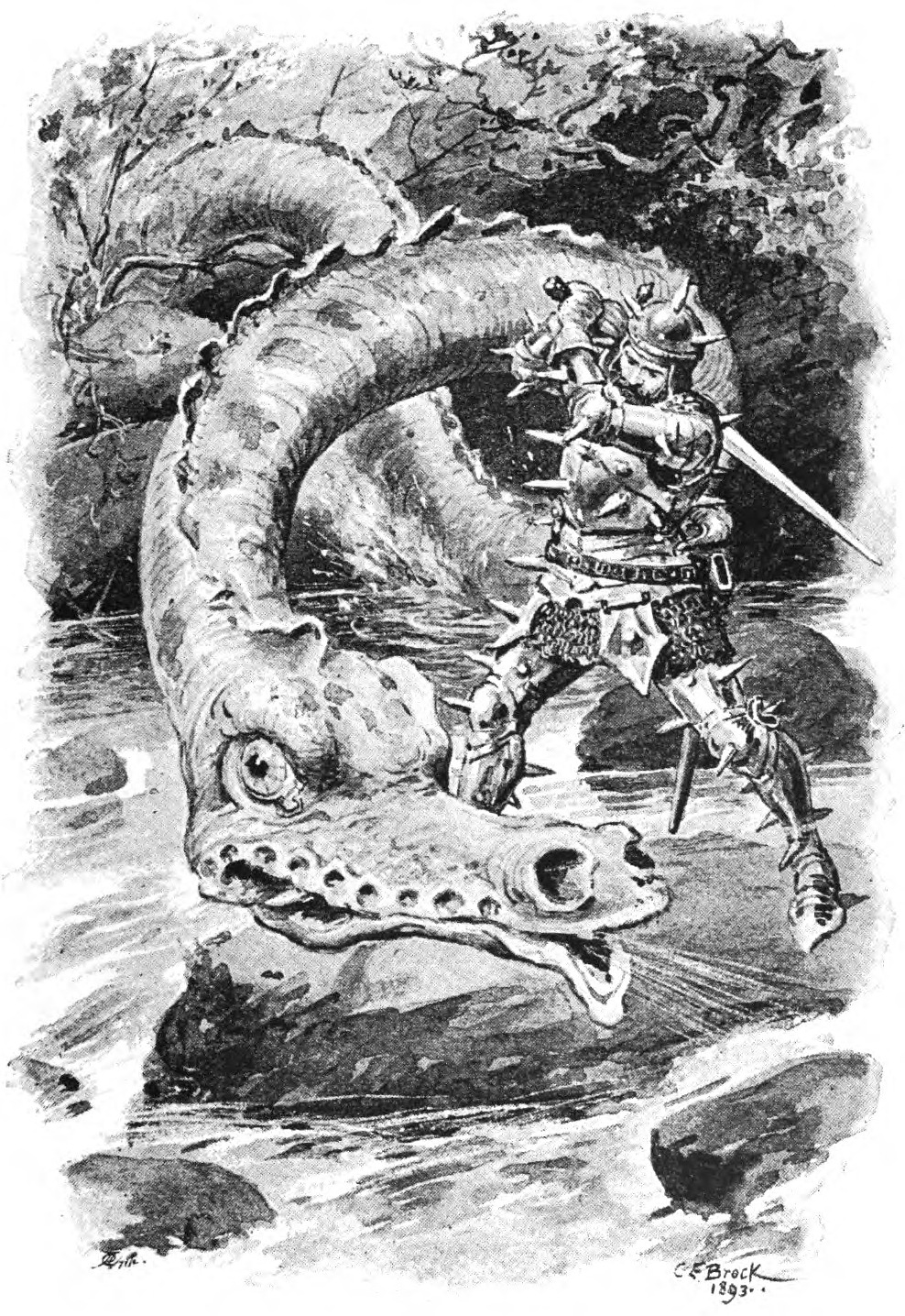
"He struck a violent blow upon the monster's head" by C. E. Brock in English Fairy and Other Folk Tales (ed. Edwin Sidney Hartland, 1890)

The Lambton Worm is a legend from County Durham in North-East England in the United Kingdom. The story takes place around the River Wear, and is one of the area's pieces of folklore, having been adapted from written and oral tradition into pantomime and song formats.

== Legend ==
The story revolves around John Lambton, an heir of the Lambton Estate, County Durham (in ceremonial Tyne and Wear), and his battle with a giant worm (dragon) that had been terrorising the local villages.

=== Origin of the worm ===
The story states that the young John Lambton was a rebellious character who missed church one Sunday to go fishing in the River Wear. In many versions of the story, while walking to the river, or setting up his equipment, John receives warnings from an old man (or a witch – depending on who tells the story) that no good can come from missing church.

John Lambton does not catch anything until the church service finishes, at which point he fishes out a small eel- or lamprey-like creature with nine holes on each side of its salamander-like head. Depending on the version of the story, the worm is no bigger than a thumb, or about 3 feet (90 centimetres) long. In some renditions it has legs, while in others it is said to more closely resemble a snake.

At this point, the old man returns, although in some versions it is a different character. John declares that he has "catched [caught] the devil" and decides to dispose of his catch by discarding it down a nearby well. The old man then issues further warnings about the nature of the beast.

John then forgets about the creature and eventually grows up. As a penance for his rebellious early years, he joins the Crusades.

=== Worm's wrath ===
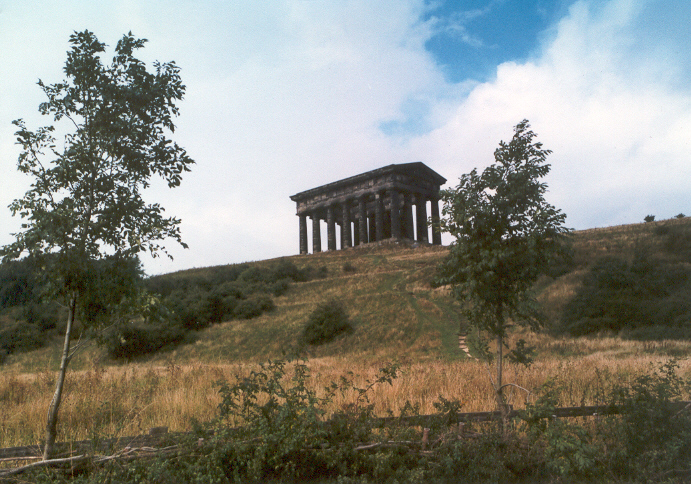
Penshaw Monument, from the south

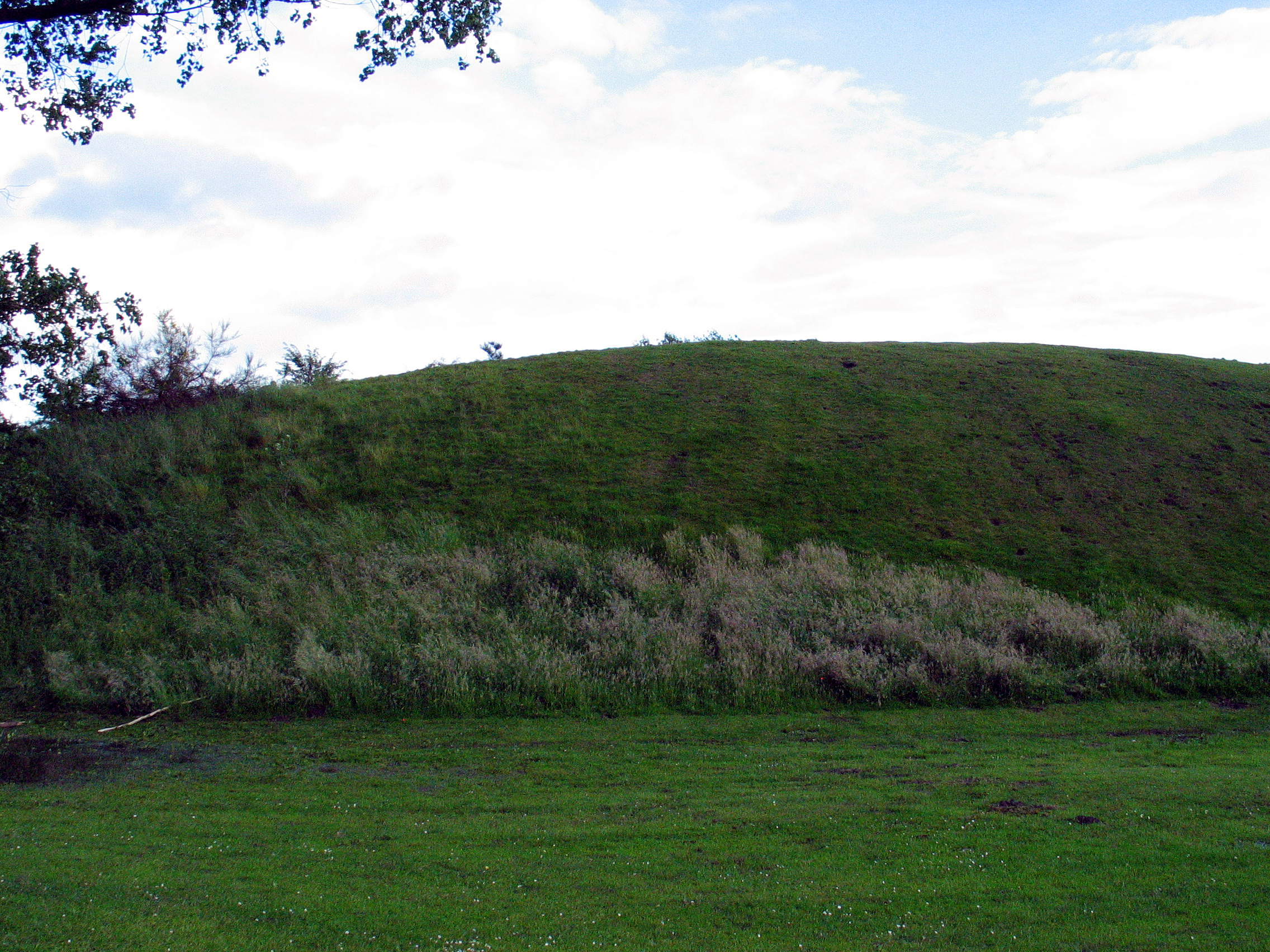
Worm Hill, Fatfield, Washington

Eventually, the worm grows extremely large and the well becomes poisonous. The villagers start to notice livestock going missing and discover that the fully-grown worm has emerged from the well and coiled itself around a local hill.

Earlier, and local, versions of the legend associate the hill with Worm Hill, in Fatfield. In most versions of the story, the worm is large enough to wrap itself around the hill seven times. It is said that one can still see the marks of the worm on Worm Hill. However, in the later song the hill is Penshaw Hill on which the Penshaw Monument now stands, as this hill is larger and much more culturally relevant in the local area, likely due to the size difference, as Worm Hill is very small.

The worm terrorises the nearby villages, eating sheep, preventing cows from producing milk, and snatching away small children. It then heads towards Lambton Castle, where the Lord (John Lambton's aged father) manages to sedate the creature in what becomes a daily ritual of offering the worm the milk of nine good cows – twenty imperial gallons (24 US gal; 91 L), or a filled trough.

A number of brave villagers try to kill the beast, but are quickly dispatched. When a chunk is cut off the worm, it simply reattaches the missing piece. Visiting knights also try to assault the beast, but none survive. When annoyed, the worm uproots trees by coiling its tail around them, then creates devastation by waving around the uprooted trees like a club.

=== Vanquishing of the worm ===
After seven years, John Lambton returns from the Crusades to find his father's estates almost destitute because of the worm. John decides to fight it, but first seeks the guidance of a wise woman or witch near Durham.

The witch hardens John's resolve to kill the beast by explaining his responsibility for the worm. She tells him to cover his armour in spearheads and fight the worm in the River Wear, where it now spends its days wrapped around a great rock. The witch also tells John that after killing the worm he must then kill the first living thing he sees, or else his family will be cursed for nine generations and will not die in their beds.

John prepares his armour according to the witch's instructions and arranges with his father that, when he has killed the worm, he will sound his hunting horn three times. On this signal, his father is to release his favourite hound so that it will run to John, who can then kill the dog and thus avoid the curse.

John Lambton then fights the worm by the river. The worm tries to crush him, wrapping him in its coils, but it cuts itself on his armour's spikes; the pieces of the worm fall into the river, and are washed away before they can join up again. Eventually, the worm is dead and John sounds his hunting horn three times. In some versions, John slays the worm with an Andrew Ferrara. At the Lambton manor, there was once an Andrew Ferrara with the date 1521 inscribed on it which supposedly was the sword which belonged to John Lambton.

=== Lambton curse ===
Unfortunately, John's father is so excited that the beast is dead that he forgets to release the hound and rushes out to congratulate his son. John cannot bear to kill his father and so, after they meet, the hound is released and dutifully dispatched. But it is too late and nine generations of Lambtons are cursed so they shall not die peacefully in their beds. Thus, the story ends.

This curse seems to have held true for at least three generations, possibly helping to contribute to the popularity of the story.

- 1st generation: Robert Lambton, drowned at Newrig.
- 2nd: Sir William Lambton, a Colonel of Foot, killed at Marston Moor.
- 3rd: William Lambton, died in battle at Wakefield.
- 9th: Henry Lambton, died in his carriage crossing Lambton Bridge on 26 June 1761.

(One of Henry Lambton's brothers, described as "[h]is succeeding brother, the General", is said to have kept a horse whip by his bedside to ward off violent assaults. He died in his bed at an old age.)

== Cultural impact ==
=== Song ===
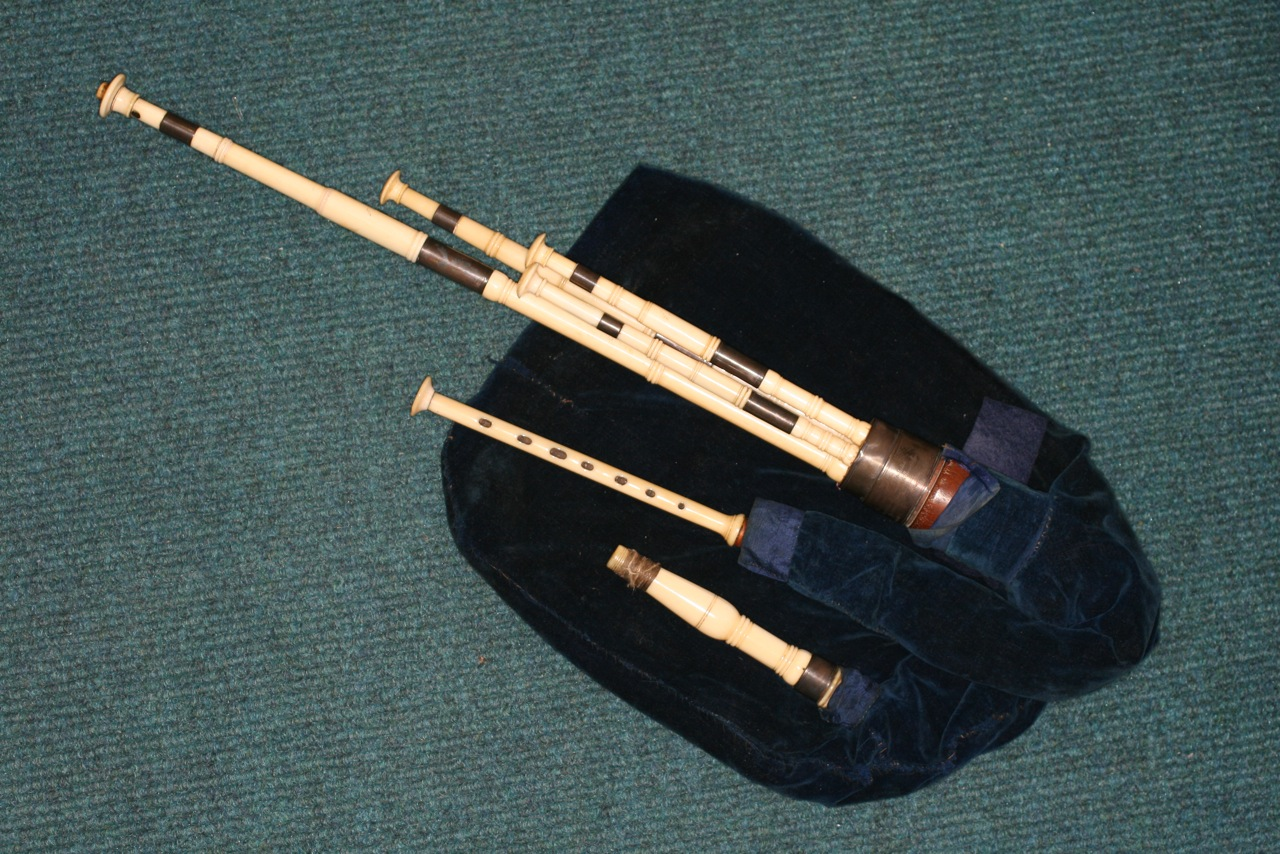
Northumbrian smallpipes, played in North East England

The story was made into a song (Roud #2337), written in 1867 by C. M. Leumane, which passed into oral tradition and has several slightly different variants (most notably the use of "goggly" or "googly" eyes meaning bulging and searching, a term formerly widely used on Wearside). It features several words only found in Northumbrian dialect.

Tune from Tyne Pantomime 1867

One Sunda morn young Lambton went
A-fishing in the Wear;
An' catched a fish upon he's heuk	(=caught) (=his hook)
He thowt leuk't vary queer.	(=thought looked very strange)
But whatt'n a kind ov fish it was	(=what kind of)
Young Lambton cudden't tell-
He waddn't fash te carry'd hyem,	(=could not be bothered to carry it home)
So he hoyed it doon a well	(=threw it down)
(Chorus)
Whisht! lads, haad yor gobs,	(=Hush boys, hold your mouths)
An' aa'll tell ye aall an aaful story,	(=I'll tell you all an awful)
Whisht! lads, haad yor gobs,
An' Aa'll tel ye 'boot the worm.	(=about)
Noo Lambton felt inclined te gan	(=go)
An' fight i' foreign wars.
He joined a troop ov Knights that cared
For nowther woonds nor scars,	(=neither wounds)
An' off he went te Palestine
Where queer things him befel,
An varry seun forgat aboot	(=very soon forgot about)
The queer worm i' tha well.
(Chorus)
But the worm got fat an' grewed an' grewed,
An' grewed an aaful size;
He'd greet big teeth, a greet big gob,
An greet big goggly eyes.
An' when at neets he craaled aboot	(=nights) (=crawled around)
Te pick up bits o' news,
If he felt dry upon the road,
He'd milk a dozen coos.	(=cows)
(Chorus)
This feorful worm would often feed	(=fearful)
On caalves an' lambs an' sheep,
An' swally little bairns alive	(=swallow) (=children)
When they laid doon te sleep.
An when he'd eaten aall he cud	(=all he could)
An' he'd had he's fill,
He craaled away an' lapped he's tail	(=wrapped)
Ten times roond Pensha Hill.	(=Penshaw Hill, a local landmark)
(Chorus)
The news ov this myest aaful worm	(=most)
An' his queer gannins on	(=goings-on)
Seun crossed the seas, gat te the ears	(=soon) (=got to)
Ov brave an' bowld Sor John.	(=bold)
So hyem he cam an' catched the beast,	(=home he came and caught)
An' cut 'im in three halves,
An' that seun stopped hes eatin' bairns
An' sheep an' lambs an' caalves.
(Chorus)
So noo ye knaa hoo aall the foaks	(=now you know how all the folk)
On byeth sides ov the Wear	(=both)
Lost lots o' sheep an' lots o' sleep
An leeved i' mortal feor.	(=And lived in mortal fear)
So let's hev one te brave Sor John	(=let's drink to brave Sir John)
That kept the bairns frae harm,	(=from)
Saved coos an' calves by myekin' haalves	(=making halves)
O' the famis Lambton Worm.	(=famous)
(Final Chorus)
Noo lads, Aa’ll haad me gob,	(=I'll hold my mouth. Stop speaking)
That's aall Aa knaa aboot the story	(=All I know about)
Of Sir John's clivvor job	(=clever)
Wi' the aaful Lambton Worm.

=== Comics and literature ===
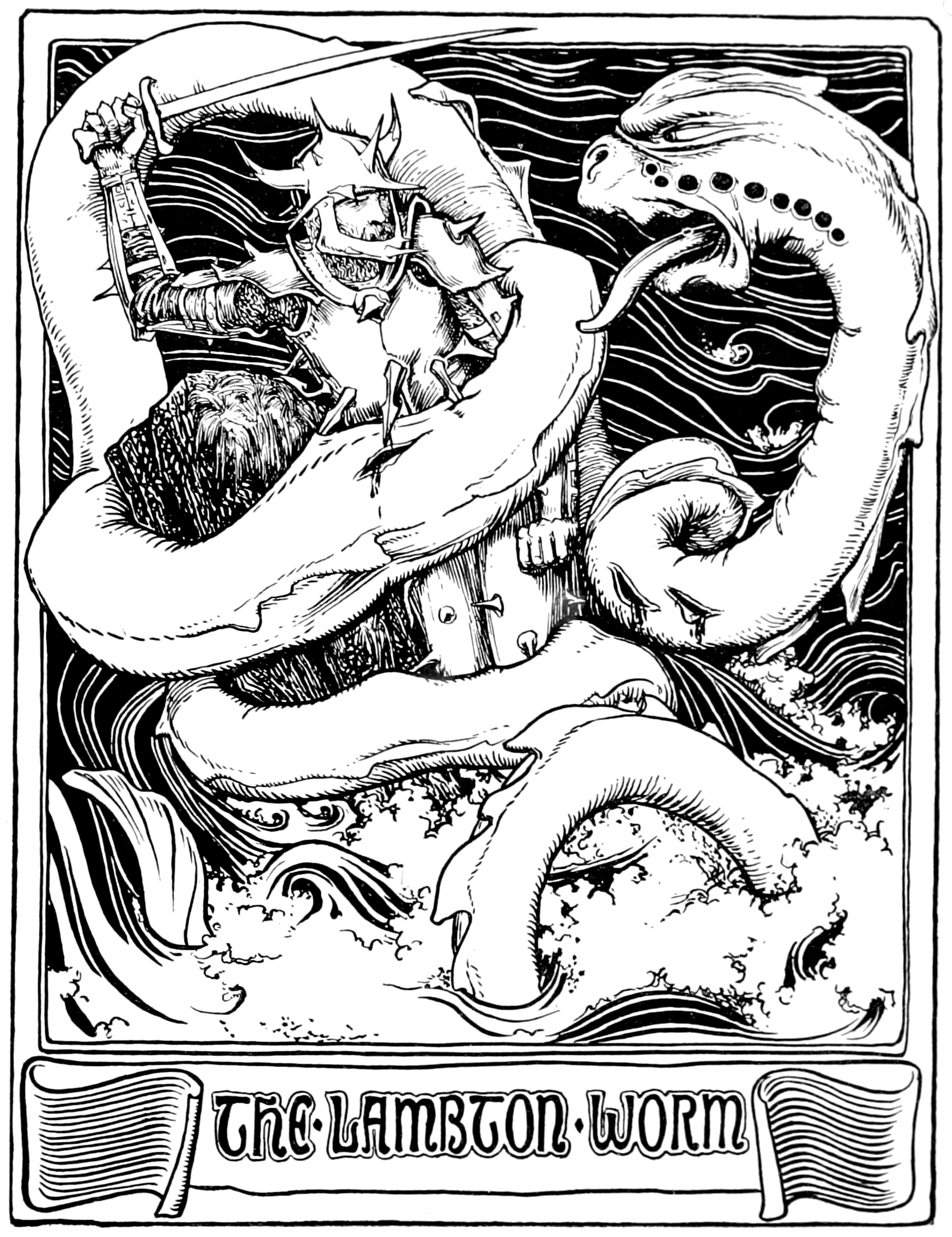
Illustration by John Dickson Batten from More English Fairy Tales

- Bram Stoker's 1911 novel The Lair of the White Worm and Ian Watson's 1988 novel The Fire Worm draw heavily on the Lambton Worm legend.
- This myth, along with many others originating from the North East, is retold in the graphic novel Alice in Sunderland by Bryan Talbot.
- Jeff Smith's graphic novel Rose has the title character following the same instructions to order to defeat a dragon.
- The Lambton Worm legend, including the subsequent death of Henry Lambton, is referred to in Thomas Pynchon's novel Mason and Dixon; typically, given the themes of mythology and historiography within the novel, Pynchon alters some details of the legend (for instance, moving to Transylvania the location of the "wise woman" who gives advice given to John Lambton on how to defeat the worm).
- A version of the tale was published by Joseph Jacobs, using William Henderson's text in Folk-Lore of Northern Counties as a source.
- "Jabberwocky" may have been partly inspired by the legend of the Lambton Worm.
- Willam Mayne's children's novel The Worm in the Well, published in 2002, is an adapted retelling of the Lambton Worm legend.
- Sarah Hindmarsh's "The Worm," a short story published in The Forgotten and the Fantastical 2, edited by Teika Bellamy, is based on the Lambton Worm story.
- The modern fantasy novel The Green Man's Heir (2018) by Juliet E. McKenna features a surviving juvenile specimen and the urgent need to counter the threat it presents.
- In 2018, Mike Mignola & Ben Steinbeck produced a short comic titled "Return of the Lambton Worm," which features a confrontation between the monster and Hellboy.

=== Opera ===
The Lambton Worm (1978) is an opera in two acts by the composer Robert Sherlaw Johnson with a libretto by the Oxford poet Anne Ridler. There are eleven solo roles (four of them major), a chorus and orchestra.

=== Film ===
- The 1988 film The Lair of the White Worm is based on Stoker's novel. Leumane's song is recast in the film as the "d'Ampton Worm", arranged by Emilio Perez Machado and Stephan Powys, and performed by them and Louise Newman.
- In 1989, screenwriter Anthony Shaffer wrote a film treatment for The Loathsome Lambton Worm, a direct sequel to his 1973 film The Wicker Man. The sequel would have involved the original film's protagonist, a Scottish police officer, battling the Lambton Worm. However, it was never officially produced.
- A fan-made full-cast audio drama adaptation of Shaffer's The Loathsome Lambton Worm treatment was eventually released in 2020.

=== Radio and broadcast ===
The Monstrous Worm – A Medieval Folk History (2018) is a two-part audio documentary about childhood encounters with the Lambton Worm in 1940s England. By Australian filmmaker and academic Tom Murray, the audio documentary incorporates cross-cultural audio from Yolŋu manikay from Murray's 2008 film In My Father's Country. This audio documentary was broadcast on ABCRadio National and made possible by an Australian Research Council Grant, Macquarie University and the Institute of Advanced Study Fellowship scheme of Durham University in the UK.

=== Football ===
On 16 August 2025, a Tifo depicting the Lambton Worm being slain was displayed by Sunderland AFC supporters at the Stadium of Light. Alongside was a banner reading "The man who wins, is the man who thinks he can", a famous line from the poem Thinking.

== See also ==
- Sockburn Worm
- The Laidly Worm of Spindleston Heugh
- Worm of Linton
- English folklore
- Jabberwocky
- Mongolian death worm

== Bibliography ==
- Bute, Michael (1997), A Town Like Alice's, Sunderland: Heritage Publications
- Catcheside-Warrington, C.E. (1913), Tyneside Songs, vol. 3, Newcastle-upon-Tyne: J. G. Windows
- Grice, F (1944), "Folk Tales of the North Country", The Teaching of English Series, Thomas Nelson & Sons
- Jackson, Adrain, "The Worm in the Well", Books for Keeps, ISSN 0143-909X
- Jacobs, J (1922) [1894], More English Fairy Tales, Illustrated by J D Batten, London: D Nutt
- Mayne, William (14 February 2002), The Worm in the Well, Hodder Children's Books, ISBN 9780340817124
- McKenna, Juliet; et al. (Ben Baldwin) (19 March 2018), The Green Man's Heir, Wizard's Tower Press, ISBN 978-1908039699
- Sharpe, Sir Cecil (1830), The worme of Lambton
- Simpson, David (2017), Penshaw Monument and Worm Hill, archived from the original on 10 February 2019
- Stoker, Bram (1925) [First published 1911], The Lair of the White Worm , London: W. Foulsham & Co
- Talbot, Bryan (5 April 2007), Alice in Sunderland: An Entertainment, Jonathan Cape, ISBN 978-0224080767
- Tegner, Henry (1991), Ghosts of the North Country, Butler Publishing, ISBN 0-946928-40-1
