= Charles Ernest Catcheside-Warrington =

Charles Ernest Catcheside-Warrington (1859 – 1937) was an English music hall artist and songwriter from the late 19th century who became a recording artist, record producer and a collector and arranger of "Geordie" songs.

== Life ==
Catcheside-Warrington was born Charles Ernest Catcheside in Elswick in 1859, the son of Robert and Louisa Mary Catcheside (née Gowdy). He became a successful star in the national music hall, based in London. He made his first recording on a cylinder in 1883. He eventually moved back to Newcastle in 1907, where he recorded "Come Geordie ha'd the bairn," Last Neet," and "The Neebors Doon Belaw." These successful recordings were followed by recitations, sketches and stories, including "The Cullercoats Fishwife," "Census Man and The Fishwife," and "School Inspector." In 1911, Catcheside-Warrington recorded "Hawke's Man at the Battle of Waterloo," "Cushie Butterfield," and "The Paanshop's Bleezin."

During the boom in the music scene during the late 1920s and early 1930s, Catcheside-Warrington came out of retirement to make additional recordings.

He was a partner in a firm of market gardeners, nurserymen and seedsmen. He died in Northumberland on 31 July 1937.

== Works ==
=== Compilations ===
- Four volumes of his “Tyneside Songs” were published between 1912 and 1927, the contents of which are now of great historical value.
- Six volumes of his Tyneside Stories & Recitations were published in 1917 (according to "A Dictionary of North East Dialect" 2005 ) or “undated but probably sometime in the 1930s” according to other current resale documents.

=== Songs, verse and prose ===
- Bogey Cheeky Band
- The Cuddy Cairt
- The Flying Jacket
- The Girl Who Lost Her Character
- Jack’s Apology
- Owther
- The Pitman's Piano
- Ringing the Pig
- Thors alwes the Dole
- Thor's ne Pig
- When I was a soldier

=== Recordings ===
Four of his songs are available on CD: “Various Artists – Wor Nanny's A Mazer: Early Recordings Of Artists From The North East 1904–1933” (on Phonograph, PHCD2K1) :-

- Wor Nanny’s a mazer
- Cushie Butterfield
- The Cliffs of Old Tynemouth
- Last Night

A recording of the song "The Pawnshop’s Bleezin'” is available on CD: “The Keel Row – Songs of the Urban Tyne" (MWMCDSP38).

== See also ==
- Geordie dialect words
- Catcheside-Warrington's Tyneside Songs
- Catcheside-Warrington's Tyneside Stories & Recitations
