= Catcheside-Warrington's Tyneside Stories & Recitations =

Folk songs from the Geordie area of England

Tyneside Stories & Recitations is a chapbook of Geordie folk songs consisting of six volumes. As it stated on the covers, the publications were compiled and edited by Charles Ernest Catcheside-Warrington. It was published by J. G. Windows Ltd. on Central Arcade, Newcastle.

The books cost initially 1/= (One Shilling), and although undated, it is thought that the books were published in the 1930s, although according to "A Dictionary of North East Dialect" 2005 they were printed in 1917. .

== The publication ==
Charles Ernest Catcheside-Warrington.edited the six volumes of "Tyneside Stories & Recitations", a series of small booklets each of around 32 pages long and containing a mixture of songs, verse, recitations and stories, all by local Tyneside writers, some well-known, others new to the readers.

The contents of these volumes, unlike the previous four volumes of "Tyneside Songs", are less value historically, but nevertheless give the readers a feel of the lives and times of previous generations.

== Contents ==
The volumes and their contents are below :-

vol	page	title	songwriter	tune	comment	notes	ref
Tyneside Stories & Recitations Vol 1 – collected, edited and told by C. E. Catcheside-Warrington – 32
1		Jackie Rodison's Cooking	W J Robson				
1		Cuddy Cairt (The)	C. E. C-Warrington				
1		Je ne Comprend pas	local				
1		Jackie Robison dines oot	W J Robson				
1		Pit Stockins	local				
1		Garrety stories (The)	local				
1		Ralphy Dodds on the Bench	local				
1		S-s-s-arah S-s-s-impson	local				
Tyneside Stories & Recitations Vol 2 – collected, edited and told by C. E. Catcheside-Warrington – 32 pages
2		Haaks's Men (Recitation)	John Atlantic Stephenson				
2		Glass Eye (The)	R O Heslop				
2		Adam and Eve	John Atlantic Stephenson		A Wearside Story		
2		Keeker's Cat (The)	R O Heslop				
2		Trip to South Shields (A)	A Tomlinson				
2		Commarcial Traveller (The)	local				
2		No Cadgin'	T C Campbell				
2		Jack's Apology	C. E. C-Warrington				
2		Good Singer (A)	local				
Tyneside Stories & Recitations Vol 3 – collected, edited and told by C. E. Catcheside-Warrington – 32 pages
3		Tow for Nowt – (A)	John Atlantic Stephenson		A Recitation		
3		Looking for the Colonel	local				
3		Postponed Goose – (The)	John Atlantic Stephenson		A Wearside Tale		
3		When AA Was A Sowljor	C. E. C-Warrington				
3		If he Gans, AA Gan	local				
3		Didn't Want to Smell them	local				
3		Me Belge	local				
3		Scratch Away	local				
3		Wrong Boots (The)	Robert Plumpton				
3		Pair of Gondolas (A)	local				
3		Billy Shyfella's Love Story	Joe Wilson				
3		Let no man part on Sundays	W. J. Heggart				
3		Tale of the 10th Hussars (A)	Anon				
3		Ye fancy yourself Clivvor, but yo'r not	Harrison				
Tyneside Stories & Recitations Vol 4 – collected, edited and told by C. E. Catcheside-Warrington – 32 pages
4		Fish wife and the Census Man (The)	F M Gascoigne				
4		Musical Evenings	Sir G Renwick, M.P.				
4		Keep Him Doon	Sir G Renwick, M.P.				
4		Timing a Pigeon	A Tomlinson				
4		Great Loss (A)	Sir G Renwick, M.P.				
4		Job for her Aad Man (A)	Sir G Renwick, M.P.				
4		Best Place in the World (The)	Walter Merritt				
4		Grand Old Man (The)	Walter Merritt				
4		Knew him by his "sweer"	S Wade				
4		Jarmin Beuts	local				
4		Guarding Bicycle	N Pattison				
4		Missed again	N Thompson				
4		Something very exceptional	local				
4		Not been introduced	local				
4		Say "Peterboro"	local				
4		Gardening on Sunday	local				
4		Pigeon Walked (The)	local				
4		Geordy Atty's Neet Oot	D A Larmoor				
4		Bogey Cheeky Band	C. E. C-Warrington				
4		Newcassel Sang – (A) – or alternatively spelt "Newcastle Sang"	John Harbottle				
Tyneside Stories & Recitations Vol 5 – collected, edited and told by C. E. Catcheside-Warrington – 27 pages
5		Coal Shortage (The)	local				
5		Height of Ignorance	local				
5		Pitman's Piano (The)	C. E. C-Warrington				
5		Dog Stories	local				
5		Death Rate (The)	local				
5		Romance of a Cock Eye (The)					
5		Ringing the Pig	C. E. C-Warrington				
5		Owther	C. E. C-Warrington				
5		His Nick Name	local				
5		He Wanted A Medal					
5		Hard Crust					
5		Motor Car "B.C. 452"					
5		Be careful what you take					
5		Demoralised	local				
5		Stick to Beer					
Tyneside Stories & Recitations Vol 6 – collected, edited and told by C. E. Catcheside-Warrington – 28 pages
6		Phoebe Lizzie's Wedding	A. C. Hudson				
6		Heavy Suet Pudden (A)	H. Sullivan				
6		Flying Jacket (The)	C. E. C-Warrington				
6		What Gladstone did in '69	Anon				
6		Lost Weskit (The)	local				
6		Reduced Coinage	local				
6		Caad Dickey (A)	local				
6		Bod and the Babby (The)	A. Tomlinson				
6		Barry Three Mair	A. Tomlinson				
6		Divvent Wake 'im	A. Tomlinson				
6		In the barber's	local				
6		Men of Few Words	G. Brown				
6		Girl who lost her Character (The)	C. E. C-Warrington				
6		Thors alwes the Dole	C. E. C-Warrington				
6		Cheerful Funeral (A)	Edythe Warrington				
6		Servant "Guest" (The)	Edythe Warrington				
6		Thor's ne Pig	C. E. C-Warrington				
6		Funeral Joke (A)	local				
6		Scanty Evening Dress	local				

== See also ==
- Geordie dialect words
- Charles Ernest Catcheside-Warrington
- Catcheside-Warrington's Tyneside Songs
