= Nelly Gray (song) =

American folk song

"My Darling Nelly Gray", sung by J. W. Myers in 1904

Benjamin Hanby

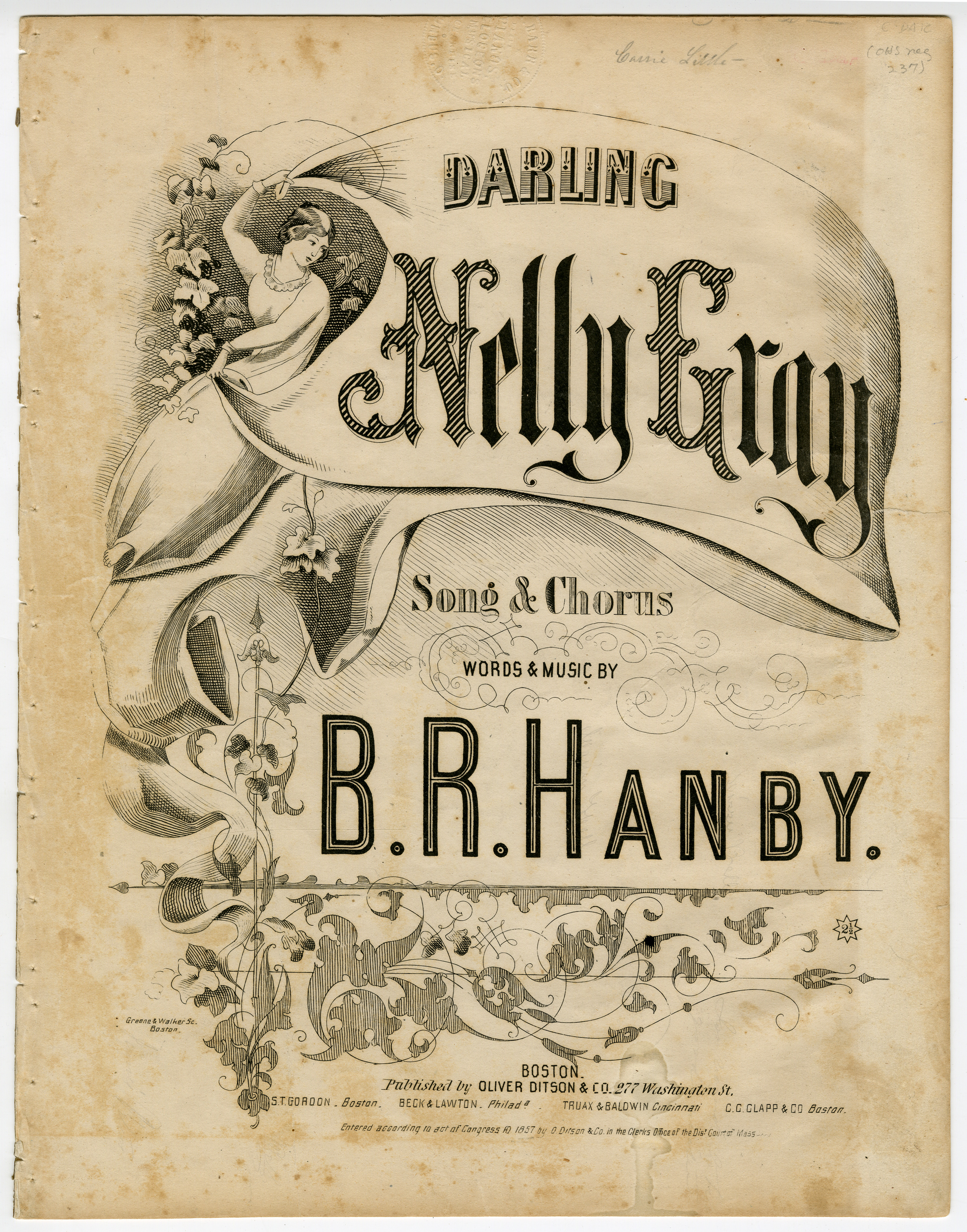
Darling Nelly Gray by Benjamin Hanby

"Darling Nelly Gray" is a 19th century anti-slavery ballad written and composed by Benjamin Hanby in 1856. It is written as from the point of view of an African-American male slave in Kentucky whose sweetheart has been taken away by slave-owners. The man mourns his beloved, who has been sold South to Georgia (where the slave’s life was conventionally regarded as harsher). He eventually dies and joins her in heaven. The song became popular in the years preceding the Civil War and helped promote support for the abolitionist cause.

== History ==
Hanby composed the song while attending Otterbein University in Westerville, Ohio in 1856 and was inspired by the Hanby family’s encounter with Joseph Selby, a runaway slave from Kentucky who died at the Hanby home in Rushville after relating the moving story of his escape to freedom and having to leave behind his lost love. Benjamin Hanby's father, Bishop William Hanby, a United Brethren minister who was active in the Underground Railroad, was attempting to raise money to free Selby's beloved when Selby died of pneumonia.

The relationship to the English folk song Maggie May, which has the same music and similar lyrics, is unclear.

The tune was subsequently used by Geordie music hall singer Joe Wilson to set his song Keep yor feet still Geordie hinny and by trade union activist and Industrial Workers of the World member Ralph Chaplin, to set The Commonwealth of Toil.

A recording by Louis Armstrong and The Mills Brothers was popular in 1937 reaching the charts of the day. Maxine Sullivan recorded the song for Vocalion on October 22, 1937 and Bing Crosby recorded it for Decca Records on April 25, 1938.

The melody of Darling Nelly Gray is the (nearly identical) basis for the melody of Faded Love, a 1950 hit for Bob Wills.

== Lyrics ==
There's a low, green valley, on the old Kentucky shore.
Where I've whiled many happy hours away,
A-sitting and a-singing by the little cottage door,
Where lived my darling Nelly Gray.

Chorus
Oh! my poor Nelly Gray, they have taken you away,
And I'll never see my darling any more;
I'm sitting by the river and I'm weeping all the day.
For you've gone from the old Kentucky shore.

When the moon had climbed the mountain and the stars were shining too.
Then I'd take my darling Nelly Gray,
And we'd float down the river in my little red canoe,
While my banjo sweetly I would play.

One night I went to see her, but "She's gone!" the neighbors say.
The white man bound her with his chain;
They have taken her to Georgia for to wear her life away,
As she toils in the cotton and the cane.

My canoe is under water, and my banjo is unstrung;
I'm tired of living any more;
My eyes shall look downward, and my song shall be unsung
While I stay on the old Kentucky shore.

My eyes are getting blinded, and I cannot see my way.
Hark! there's somebody knocking at the door.
Oh! I hear the angels calling, and I see my Nelly Gray.
Farewell to the old Kentucky shore.

Chorus
Oh, my darling Nelly Gray, up in heaven there they say,
That they'll never take you from me any more.
I'm a-coming-coming-coming, as the angels clear the way,
Farewell to the old Kentucky shore!

== Gallery ==
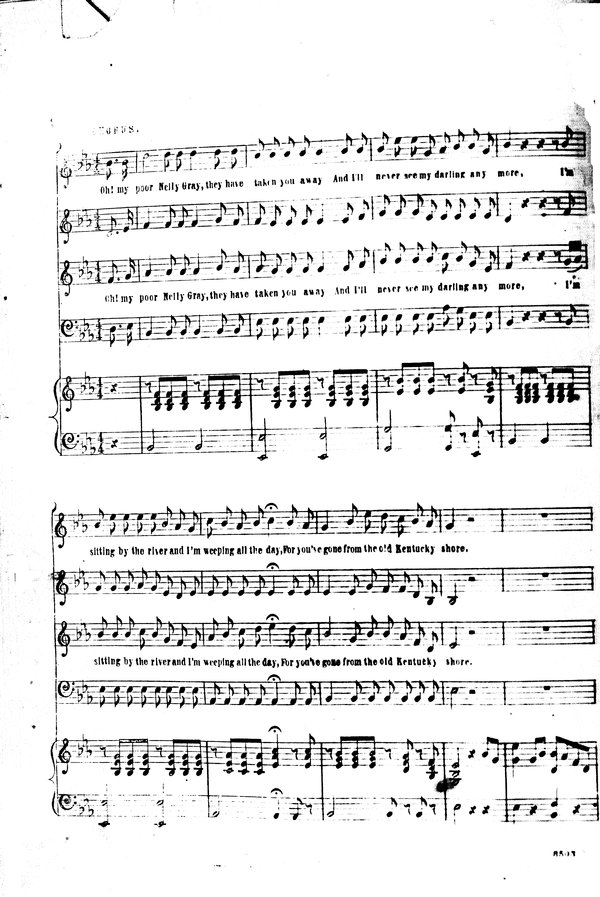
Darling Nelly Gray, page two

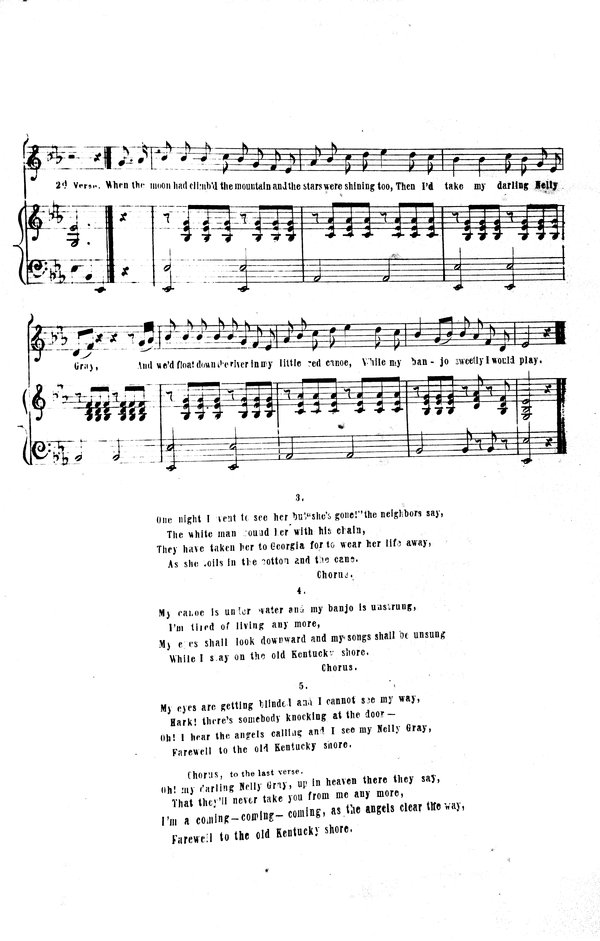
Darling Nelly Gray, page three

== See also ==
- Passamezzo moderno
