= The Lair of the White Worm =

1911 Gothic horror novel by Bram Stoker

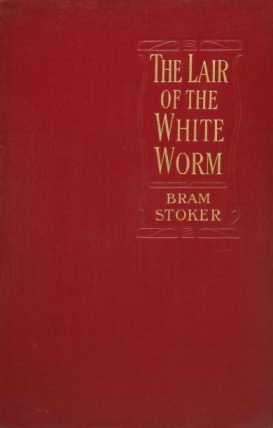
- Cover of the first edition
- Author: Bram Stoker
- Illustrator: Pamela Colman Smith
- Genre: Gothic; horror; dark fantasy
- Set in: Derbyshire, 1860
- Publisher: William Rider and Son Ltd (London: W. Rider)
- Publication date: 1911
- Publication place: United Kingdom
- Media type: Print (hardcover)
- Pages: 324
- Dewey Decimal: 823.912
- LC Class: PZ3.S8743 La PR6037.T617
- Text: The Lair of the White Worm at Wikisource

The Lair of the White Worm is a Gothic horror novel and dark fantasy novel by the Irish writer Bram Stoker. It was first published by Rider and Son of London in 1911 – the year before Stoker's death – with colour illustrations by Pamela Colman Smith. The story is based on the legend of the Lambton Worm. It has also been issued as The Garden of Evil.

The novel is set in Derbyshire in 1860. An Australian, Adam Salton, is invited to visit the estate of his elderly great-uncle and learns that he is the uncle's intended heir. He finds black snakes on his great uncle's property and learns about recent incidents of death or near-death by snakebite. He witnesses a local woman murdering a servant. He then discovers that she may be the White Worm of local legend in human form. In this case, "worm" is a term for a Germanic dragon.

In 1925, an abridged and rewritten version was published by William Foulsham. It was shortened from 40 chapters to 28.

The novel was adapted by Ken Russell into a 1988 film of the same name.

== Plot summary ==
The central character of the book is Adam Salton, an Australian (living there at the outset) who in 1860 is contacted by his elderly great-uncle, Richard Salton, a landed gentleman of Lesser Hill, Derbyshire, England, who has no other family and wants to establish a relationship with the only other living member of the Salton family. Although Adam has already made his own fortune in Australia, he enthusiastically agrees to meet his uncle. On his arrival by ship at Southampton, the two men quickly become good friends. His great-uncle then reveals that he wishes to make Adam the heir to his estate, Lesser Hill. Adam travels there and quickly finds himself at the center of mysterious events, with Sir Nathaniel de Salis, a friend of Richard Salton's, as his guide.

Edgar Caswall, the new heir to a neighbouring estate, Castra Regis or Royal Camp, is in the process of making a mesmeric assault on a local girl, Lilla Watford. Meanwhile, Arabella March, of Diana's Grove, is running a game of her own, perhaps angling to become Mrs. Edgar Caswall. Caswall is a slightly pathological eccentric and has inherited Franz Mesmer's chest, which he keeps in the Castra Regis Tower. Caswall seeks to make use of mesmerism, a precursor to hypnotism, and, obsessed with Lilla, attempts to break her using mesmeric powers. However, with the help of Lilla's half-Burmese cousin, Mimi Watford, he is thwarted time and again.

Caswall has a giant kite built in the shape of a hawk to scare away pigeons that have attacked his fields and destroyed his crops. For lack of anything better to do, he obsessively watches the kite and begins to believe that it has a mind of its own and that he himself is a god.

Adam Salton finds black snakes on his great uncle's property and buys a mongoose to hunt them down. He then discovers a child who has been bitten on the neck and who almost dies as a result. Adam learns that another child has already been killed by a snake bite and that animals have also been killed mysteriously throughout the county.

Caswall's Black African servant, Oolanga, a man obsessed with death and torture, prowls around the Castra Regis estate, enjoying the carnage left by the White Worm. Adam's mongoose attacks Arabella, who shoots it to death. Adam buys more mongooses and keeps them locked in trunks when not using them to hunt. Arabella tears another mongoose apart with her hands. Oolanga takes a liking to Arabella, perhaps sensing something violent in her, and makes advances. Arabella scorns Oolanga and is deeply insulted that he would dare to approach her. In an attempt to win her over, Oolanga steals one of Adam's trunks (which he believes is filled with treasure, but is actually just another mongoose), and Adam follows Oolanga. Arabella lures Oolanga to a deep well in her house, then in rage and disgust murders him by dragging him down into the deep pit tunneled through a bed of white china clay. Adam witnesses the murder, but has no evidence of it apart from his own word. Arabella writes him a letter the next day, with the previous night's events twisted, claiming her complete innocence. Adam and Sir Nathaniel begin to suspect that Arabella is guilty of other crimes and that she wants to murder Mimi Watford. To further protect her, Adam marries Mimi secretly.

Adam and Sir Nathaniel then plot to stop Arabella by whatever means necessary. Sir Nathaniel is a Van Helsing-type character who wants to hunt down Arabella, who he believes, with increasing conviction, is the supernatural human embodiment of the White Worm of legend. She exploits the White Worm and has acquired characteristics similar to those of the creature. This is only his theory, however, which is not corroborated by any evidence or facts in the story itself.

The White Worm is a large snake-like creature dwelling deep under Arabella's house at Diana's Grove. It has green glowing eyes and feeds on whatever living creatures it can find to eat. Sir Nathaniel believes the Worm is descended from dragons, who traded their physical power for cunning. The Worm ascends from its pit and seeks to attack Adam and Mimi Watford in the forest of Diana's Grove.

The White Worm pursues Adam, Sir Nathaniel, and Mimi in a long chase as they seek to outpace it in a horse-drawn coach. A boat awaits them on the shore. This allows them to chase down the ship and to board it. The White Worm enters the water and stalks them but they are able to elude it and escape. The White Worm is described as a "whale" by observers because of its large size.

Adam is able to foil Arabella's multiple attempts to murder Mimi. In financial straits, Arabella offers to sell Diana's Grove, which Adam buys with the aim of destroying the White Worm. He plans to fill the pit with sand and set dynamite to kill the Worm while it is underground.

Caswall's last visit to Lilla ends in her death after his mesmeric attack leaves her totally drained and exhausted. Arabella joins Caswall as Mimi enters the room but is unable to save Mimi.

In the final chapters, Mimi Watford confronts Caswall who has finally succumbed to madness. He lures her onto the roof of Castra Regis House as a storm approaches and shows off his kite, despite the thunderheads building in the sky. Arabella, who had been stalking Mimi, watches from nearby and steals some of the wire holding the kite, apparently unspooling it all the way back to her house. When Mimi discovers Caswall has locked her onto the roof she shoots off the lock with a gun Adam gave her for her protection and flees home.

Adam convinces her to go back outside with him where they witness the following events: a massive thunderstorm breaks over Castra Regis House, a lightning bolt is grounded by the kite and demolishes the Castra Regis tower; it then travels through the wire Arabella had run to Diana's Grove and ignites Adam's dynamite, which pulverizes the White Worm and destroys the house and Arabella at the same time. Adam, Sir Nathaniel, and Mimi Watford survive the ordeal. In the closing scenes, Adam and Sir Nathaniel survey the destruction. (In the 1925 edition: After this, Adam and Mimi Watford are married.)

Illustrations

1911 illustration by Pamela Colman Smith, facing page 60 in the first edition

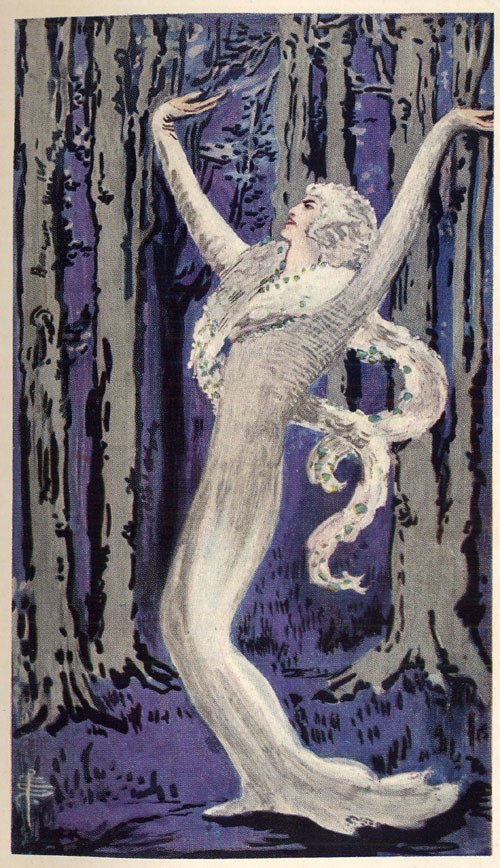
1911 illustration by Smith, facing page 86 in the first edition

1911 illustration by Pamela Colman Smith, facing page 100 in the first edition

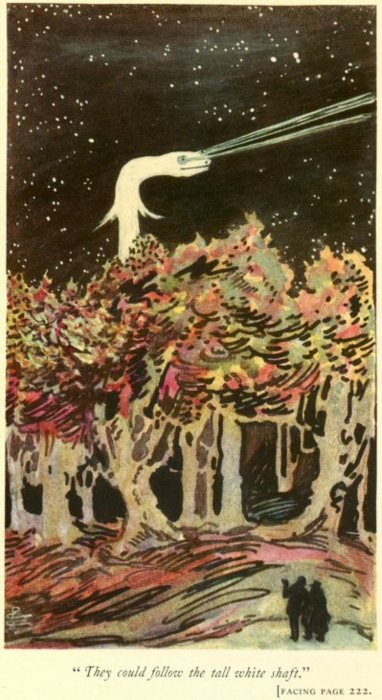
1911 illustration by Pamela Colman Smith, facing page 222 in the first edition (viewed at HathiTrust)

1911 illustration by Smith, facing page 148 in the first edition

1911 illustration by Smith, facing page 294 in the first edition

== Characters ==
Adam Salton
A 27 year-old native of Australia who is contacted and invited in 1860 by his elderly great-uncle, Richard Salton, a landed gentleman of Lesser Hill, Derbyshire, England, to come to England. Richard Salton has no other family and wants to establish a relationship with the only other living member of the family. Adam comes into conflict with Arabella March. He brings mongooses to address the snake problem. These are killed by Arabella.

Richard Salton
The grand-uncle of Adam Salton, he lives in the estate of Lesser Hill. Approaching eighty years old, Richard invites Adam and reveals to him that he is the heir to his inheritance. He also familiarizes him with the Mercia community.

Sir Nathaniel de Salis
His abode is the Doom Tower. He is a scholar and traveler as well as the President of the Mercian Archaeological Society. He was a freeholder near Castra Regis, whose estate is Doom Tower on Peak over the border of Derbyshire. Sir Nathaniel presents Adam with the history of the region and the people who live there. He allies with Richard and Adam against Arabella and Edgar Caswell. He tells Adam of the Roman settlement and history of the region after the conquest. In particular, he emphasizes the history of Mercia.

Edgar Caswall
Edgar Caswall of the Castle of Castra Regis is in his thirties. He is described as ruthless, egotistical, self-absorbed, and controlling. His face is hard and evokes an air of repugnance. He has an African servant, Oolanga, who is the butt of Adam's, Caswall's, and Arabella's racist and derogatory attacks. He is the heir to the Derbyshire estate of Castra Regis. His family has long had an association with mesmerism, a form of hypnotism developed by Franz Mesmer. He uses mesmerism against Mimi and Lilla. He has created a large kite to frighten away massive swarms of birds.

Lady Arabella March
She lives at the manor called Diana’s Grove. Lady Arabella has fallen on difficult financial times. She seeks a marriage to Edgar Caswall to improve her fortunes. Caswall, however, is attracted to two young women who live at Mercy Farm, Mimi and Lilla Watford. She comes into conflict with Adam after she kills his mongoose. She herself is described as snake-like and has an unusual affinity for snakes.

Oolanga
He is Edgar Caswall’s West African servant. He attempts to woo the Lady Arabella. He incurs the wrath and animosity of Adam Salton because of his role with Caswall and Arabella.

Mimi Watford
She married Adam Salton in part to protect herself from Edgar Caswall and Arabella March. Half-Burmese, she is the cousin of Lilla Watford. She is able to resist Caswall's mesmeric attacks.

Lilla Watford
Like her cousin Mimi Watford, she is the target of attacks by Edward Caswall and Arabella March. Caswall uses mesmerism against both. Adam Salton and Nathaniel de Salis seek to protect them. She eventually succumbs to Caswall's repeated mesmeric attacks.

== Reception ==
1925 cover, Foulsham edition, London.

In The Penguin Encyclopedia of Horror and the Supernatural, edited by Jack Sullivan, the novel is compared to Dracula: "The Freudian, bloodcurdling Lair of the White Worm features a monstrous worm secreted for thousands of years in a bottomless well and able to metamorphose into a woman. It has several parallels to Dracula (with Sir Nathaniel de Salis assuming the Van Helsing role) and contains some of Stoker's most graphic and grisly moments of horror."

Contemporary reviews in the UK were generally positive. Daily Mail: "Mr. Stoker tells his story well." Daily Telegraph: "Let no one read this book before going to bed." Court Journal: "In matters of mystery, imagination, and horror, Mr. Stoker's latest romance can give points to any of its predecessors." The World: "An excellent idea is that on which 'The Lair of the White Worm' is founded, and an excellent story has Mr. Bram Stoker made of it." The Scotsman: "In his latest novel Mr. Bram Stoker again shows himself to be the possessor of a vivid imagination, of a subtle power of analysis and of a supreme faculty for telling, in a circumstantial way, a blood-curdling yarn."

Reviews of the novel in the U.S. were much more negative. Les Daniels noted that while The Lair of the White Worm had "potential", it was undermined by the "clumsy style" of the writing. The horror critic R. S. Hadji placed The Lair of the White Worm at number twelve in his list of 13 Worst Stinkers of the Weird in 1983. H. P. Lovecraft, in his essay "Supernatural Horror in Literature", stated that Stoker "utterly ruins a magnificent idea by a development almost infantile." The New York Times description: "A surreal and dark-humoured tale."

In his 2004 biography of Stoker, From the Shadow of Dracula, Paul Murray described the book as "A bizarre and confusing novel, the story is full of incredible and fantastic sub-plots, with little overall coherence or consistency. Some parts have to be repeatedly re-read simply to try to make sense of them."

== Publishing history ==
The novel was republished in 1925 in an abridged and partly rewritten edition by W. Foulsham & Company Limited in the UK with a colour dustjacket cover featuring the characters Edgar Caswall and Lilla Watford, based on the 1911 drawings by Pamela Colman Smith. Foulsham also published the book in a different dustjacket without the diagonal blue bar with the phrase "Another Great Thriller By the author of Dracula" and "Bram Stoker Author of Dracula" on the spine. The original 1911 edition was republished in 1986 under the title Dracula and The Lair of the White Worm by Foulsham.

The novel book was first published in the U.S. in 1966 under the title The Garden of Evil by Paperback Library in New York, as a part of their Paperback Library Gothic series.

In 2008, Penguin Books in the UK released a paperback version of the novel as part of its Gothic Classics series.

In 2012, HarperCollins published a new ebook edition of the novel as part of its Harper Perennial Classics series and in 2013 as part of the Collins Classics series featuring an original 1911 illustration on the front cover.

In 2017, an audiobook of the novel was released by Audible narrated by David McCallion.

== Adaptations and popular culture ==
- In 1925 a highly abridged and rewritten form was published by Foulsham. It was shortened by more than 100 pages, the rewritten book having only 28 chapters instead of the original 40. The final eleven chapters were cut down to only five, leading some critics to complain that the ending was abrupt and inconsistent.
- The Lair of the White Worm was loosely adapted by Ken Russell into a 1988 film of the same name starring Hugh Grant and Amanda Donohoe.
- The first episode of the 2006 German radio drama "Die schwarze Sonne", produced by the label LAUSCH, is loosely based on the events of The Lair of the White Worm. The main characters of the radio drama are also based on the protagonists of the novel and feature in the rest of the episodes even though the plot turns away from Stoker's original story.
- The White Worm makes an appearance in one optional encounter in Jonathan Green's 2021 ACE gamebook Dracula: Curse of the Vampire, where it has taken possession of the body of Count Dracula.
- In 2014, a graphic novel, Dogma: Lair of the White Worm: A Graphical Adaptation, was published, written and illustrated by Ri Largo, based on the novel.

== Sources ==
- Ballam, J. D. "‘Science as the Base of Wonders’: Rational Enquiry in Bram Stoker’s The Jewel of Seven Stars and The Lair of the White Worm." Restoring the Mystery of the Rainbow: Literature’s Refraction of Science 1 (2011): 151-166.
- Brewster, Scott. "Mercian Charms: From The Lair of the White Worm to Penda’s Fen." Midland History 49.3 (2024): 305-319.
- Glover, David. "‘Why White?’: On Worms and Skin in Bram Stoker's Later Fiction." Gothic Studies 2.3 (2000): 346-360.
- Kadorkina, N.V. "The Functioning of the Category of Perceptivity in Bram Stoker’s Novel The Lair of the White Worm. Modern Humanities Success. 2021. (Russian)
- Long Hoeveler, Diane. "Objectifying Anxieties: Scientific Ideologies in Bram Stoker’s Dracula and The Lair of the White Worm." Romanticism on the Net 44 (2006).
- Panha, Ming. "The Woman and the Dragon: Dinosaur, New Woman, and Degeneration Anxiety in The Lair of the White Worm by Bram Stoker." Thammasat Historical Journal 3.2 (2016): 225-304. (Thai)
- Punter, David. "Echoes in the Animal House: The Lair of the White Worm." Bram Stoker: History, Psychoanalysis and the Gothic. London: Palgrave Macmillan UK, 1998. 173-187.
- Seed, David. "Eruptions of the Primitive into the Present: The Jewel of Seven Stars and The Lair of the White Worm." Bram Stoker: History, Psychoanalysis and the Gothic. London: Palgrave Macmillan UK, 1998. 188-204.
- Senf, Carol. "Dracula and The Lair of the White Worm: Bram Stoker‘s Commentary on Victorian Science." Gothic Studies 2.2 (2000): 218-231.
- Senf, Carol. "Bram Stoker’s The Lair of the White Worm: Supernatural Representations and Nineteenth-Century Paleontology." Supernatural Studies, vol. 2, no. 2, 2015, pp. 48–58.
