= The Caller (folk song) =

Song

Song
- Language: English (Geordie)
- Written: 1800s
- Songwriter(s): Edward “Ned” Corvan

"The Caller" (or in Geordie dialect – The Caaller) is a Geordie folk song written in the 19th century by Edward “Ned” Corvan, in a style deriving from music hall.

The song, together with many others, appeared in the publication “Allan’s Illustrated Edition of Tyneside Songs and readings with lives, portraits, and autographs of the writers, and notes on the songs. – Revised edition. Newcastle-Upon-Tyne; Thomas & George Allan, 18 Blackett Street, and 34 Collingwood Street. Sold by W Allan, 30 Grainger Street; R Allan, North Shields. London : Walter Scott. 1891”< This book was first published in 1862, being re-written and upgraded on several occasions, culminating in the final edition of 1891 “The Caller” appears on pages 392 and 393 of the final edition

== Lyrics ==
"The Caller" tells of a colliery official employed as a "knocker-upper".

This job is described in the words of Robert Wilson as "An official at a colliery engaged to call up the men for work. He makes his first round at half-past 12 a.m., and knocks at all the doors with D chalked on them. These are the deputies' houses; they go to work an hour before the hewers. Every man of the fore-shift marks 1 on his door - that is the sign for the caller to wake him at that hour. The hewer fills his tubs, and continues alternately hewing and filling. Meanwhile, the caller having roused the putters, drivers, and off-handed man, the pit 'hings on', that is, starts work at 5 o'clock." in his paper "Coal mines of Durham and Northumberland".

Why sweet slumber now disturbing,
Why break ye the midnight peace,
Why the sons of toil perturbing,
Have their hours of rest to cease ?

Chorus-
Ho ! marrows, 'tis the Caller cries,
And his voice in the gloom of the night mist dies.

The twinkling stars, through night shade peering,
Blink above with heavenly light
On the sleeping world, as a voice calls clear,
In the stilly air of the sable night.

Chorus - Ho ! marrows, etc.

The collier sleeps, e'en now he's dreaming
Of a pure bright world and loved ones there,
He basks in the rays of fortune beaming
In some far land, full and fair.

Chorus - Ho ! marrows, etc.

Dream on, thou poor and ill-used collier,
For slaves should aye have visions bright,
There's one above who deems thee holier
Than the wealthiest in his sight.

Chorus - Ho ! marrows, etc.

Speed, thee, old man, let him slumber
When happy thoughts are in his breast;
Why should the world his peace encumber?
Go, let the weary collier rest.

Chorus - Ho ! marrows, etc.

Melody taken from Tyneside Songs 1913 edition and reengraved in Lilypond.

== Comments on variations to the above version ==
In the early 19th century, as today, there were cheap books and magazines. Many of these “chapbooks” were on poor quality paper to a poor standard and with poor quality print. The works were copied with no thoughts of copyright, and the work required very little proof-reading, and what was done was not required to a high standard.

Between the many versions published there are differences, some very minor, proof reading spelling errors, variations mainly in the spelling of the words, and these sometimes variations within the same edition. Some of these are listed below:

Generally
bright misspelt as , birght
lov'd and loved
should aye and may
speed misspelt as spped
stars misspelt as stats
thee misspelt as the
ye and ya

== Recordings ==
- Denis Weatherley on CD entitled “The Folks of Shields - Around South Tyneside - Various Artists” includes “The Caller” together with 14 other titles
- Denis Weatherley, local bass-baritone – on his CD “Denis Weatherley” includes “The Caller” including 15 other songs

== See also ==
- Geordie dialect words
