= The Lair of the White Worm (film) =

1988 film by Ken Russell

- Theatrical release poster
- Directed by: Ken Russell
- Screenplay by: Ken Russell
- Based on: The Lair of the White Worm by Bram Stoker
- Produced by: Ken Russell
- Starring: Amanda Donohoe; Hugh Grant; Catherine Oxenberg; Peter Capaldi; Sammi Davis; Stratford Johns
- Cinematography: Dick Bush
- Edited by: Peter Davies
- Music by: Stanislas Syrewicz
- Production company: White Lair
- Distributed by: Vestron Pictures
- Release dates: 29 August 1988 (Montreal Film Festival); 21 October 1988 (United States); 10 March 1989 (United Kingdom)
- Running time: 93 minutes
- Countries: United Kingdom; United States
- Language: English
- Budget: $2 million
- Box office: $1.2 million (US and Canada)

The Lair of the White Worm is a 1988 supernatural comedy horror film written, produced and directed by Ken Russell. The film stars Amanda Donohoe, Hugh Grant, Catherine Oxenberg, and Peter Capaldi. Loosely based on the 1911 Bram Stoker novel of the same name, its plot follows the residents in and around a rural English manor that are tormented by an ancient priestess after the skull of a serpent that she worships is unearthed by an archaeologist.

A co-production between the United Kingdom and United States, the film was offered to Russell by the US film studio Vestron Pictures, who had released his previous film, Gothic (1986). Russell, an admirer of Stoker, loosely adapted the screenplay from the source novel, and incorporated elements of the English folktale of the Lambton Worm. Filming took place at Shepperton Studios and in Wetton, Staffordshire, England, from February to April 1988.

After screening at several North American film festivals, The Lair of the White Worm was released theatrically by Vestron Pictures in New York City on 21 October 1988, and expanded to other US cities over the following months. The film underperformed at the box office, grossing $1.2 million, and received largely unfavourable responses from critics, though it later developed a cult following.

== Plot ==
Angus Flint is an archaeology student excavating the site of a convent at Mercy Farm, a Derbyshire bed and breakfast run by the Trent sisters, Mary and Eve. He unearths an unusual skull which appears to be that of a large snake. Angus believes it is connected to the local legend of the d'Ampton "worm", a mythical snake-like creature from ages past said to have been slain in Stonerigg Cavern by John d'Ampton, the ancestor of current Lord of the Manor, James d'Ampton.

When a pocket watch is discovered in Stonerigg Cavern, James comes to believe that the d'Ampton worm may be more than a legend. The watch belonged to the Trent sisters' father Joe, who disappeared along with his wife Dorothy a year earlier near Temple House, the stately home of the seductive and enigmatic Lady Sylvia Marsh, who is secretly an immortal priestess to the ancient snake god, Dionin. Lady Sylvia sneaks into Mercy Farm and steals the snake's skull, before baring fangs and spitting venom on a crucifix hanging on the wall. Eve later touches the crucifix, absorbing some of the venom and experiencing a disturbing vision involving a crucified Jesus being encircled by a giant serpent, while a group of nuns are raped by Roman soldiers.

Lady Sylvia picks up a young male hitchhiker named Kevin and takes him to Temple House, where she seduces him before fatally paralysing him with snake venom. When James visits Temple House shortly afterwards, Lady Sylvia invites him in. She tells James she is terrified of snakes and the d'Ampton worm legend. That night, James has a surreal nightmare in which he boards a plane with Eve, Mary, and Lady Sylvia acting as stewardesses.

In the morning, James investigates the extensive Stonerigg Cavern near Temple House with Angus, Eve and Mary. When Eve decides to return to Mercy Farm before the others, she is abducted in the woods by Lady Sylvia, who intends to offer her as the latest in a long line of human sacrifices to her snake-god. James theorises that a giant snake roams the caves which connect Temple House with Stonerigg Cavern. Using large speakers, James projects Turkish music from his residence in an attempt to charm the serpent, invoking Lady Sylvia to visit him. Meanwhile, Angus and Mary break into Temple House, where they find Eve and Mary's mother, Dorothy, in a trancelike state. Dorothy suddenly bares fangs and bites Mary's neck before fleeing, triggering a hallucinatory vision in her, but Angus manages to extract the venom. Dorothy then enters James's manor and bites the neck of his butler, Peters, before James cuts her in half with a sword.

At dawn, police officer Ernie arrives at Mercy Farm, summoned by James's phone call. Mary accompanies Ernie, believing they are headed to the police station, but Ernie reveals they are driving to Temple House to investigate the previous night's events. Upon arrival, Mary discovers Ernie has been bitten and is under the serpent's spell. Angus, using bagpipes, lures Ernie away and kills him as Mary flees into the subterranean space beneath Temple House. Angus follows, and is bitten and incapacitated by a naked and blue-painted Lady Sylvia, who has morphed into a partial serpentine form in her lair. Mary is captured and bound as Lady Sylvia prepares to sacrifice Eve to Dionin, the giant snake god at the bottom of the pit above which Eve is suspended. A recovered Angus thwarts Eve's sacrifice, in the process dropping Lady Sylvia into the hole to be consumed by Dionin. He then blows up the giant serpent with a grenade. All the while, James has been leading a crew to investigate the Stonerigg Caverns from above the lair.

Angus uses an antivenom serum he acquired earlier from the local hospital to prevent Lady Sylvia's bite from affecting him. After Eve and Mary are taken to the hospital for evaluation, Angus visits James. Their meeting is interrupted by a phone call from a nurse at the hospital, who informs Angus that by mistake the supposed antivenom serum he had received was actually an arthritis medicine. Horrified, Angus examines his face in a mirror and grimaces. Moments later, Angus accepts James' invitation for a lunch celebration. In the car, Angus sinisterly smiles as the bite wound on his leg is revealed when James' hand on the gear-change lever brushes Angus' kilt.

== Cast ==
- Amanda Donohoe as Lady Sylvia Marsh
- Hugh Grant as Lord James D'Ampton
- Catherine Oxenberg as Eve Trent
- Peter Capaldi as Angus Flint
- Sammi Davis as Mary Trent
- Stratford Johns as Peters
- Paul Brooke as Ernie
- Imogen Claire as Dorothy Trent
- Chris Pitt as Kevin
- Gina McKee as Nurse Gladwell
- Christopher Gable as Joe Trent

== Analysis ==
British writer Ian Hunter described the film in his book British Trash Cinema as an aesthetic revision of 1970s films such as Horror Hospital, the Phibes films, Theatre of Blood and The Rocky Horror Picture Show.

== Production ==
=== Development ===
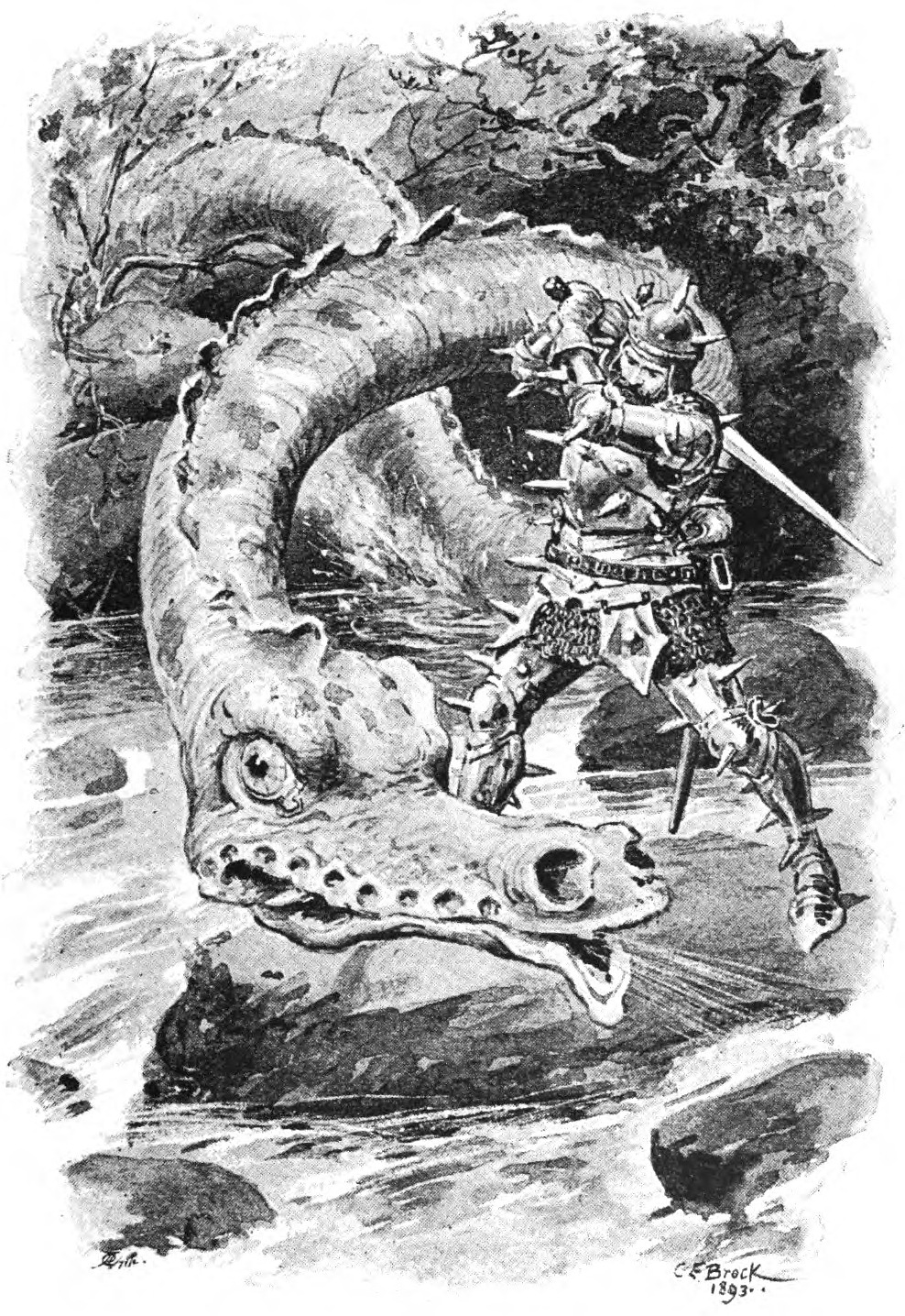
Russell incorporated elements of the English folktale of the Lambton Worm into the screenplay.

The film was made as part of a three-picture deal Russell had with US film distributor Vestron Pictures following the success of Russell's Gothic (1986). Vestron told their executive Dan Ireland, who was an admirer of Russell, that if the director could devise a horror film for the studio, they would finance his planned prequel to Women in Love, The Rainbow (eventually filmed in 1989), with a promised budget of $1 million.

Russell was an admirer of Bram Stoker and had written an adaptation of Dracula that had never been filmed. After reading Stoker's The Lair of the White Worm at a friend's suggestion, Russell decided to write a film adaptation, despite being "disappointed" by the novel: "There are touches of the master there. Dracula is a masterful novel: the psychological game the book plays is very interesting, and the Freudian elements are very deep, but those aspects are not present in Worm. What I did find was something else that took its place, in a sense, and that was for once you didn't have to go to Transylvania for the terror, it happened up the road in Derbyshire."

When writing the screenplay, Russell took the core concept of the novel, which revolves around a snake-worshipping cult, but instead centered it on the villainous priestess who helps acquire humans to "feed" the worm: "The worm really is the character that steals the show. And as with the Loch Ness Monster... there is the assumption that a land-based creature of this sort could still exist under the right conditions— which in the story is this huge cavern called Thor's Cave in Staffordshire, located next to a snake-like river." While the screenplay uses Stoker's source novel as a framework, Russell heavily incorporated the English legend of the Lambton Worm in the story.

Instead of setting the film in the early-20th-century period of the source novel, Russell chose to set it during contemporary times, and based some of the characters on people he had encountered while living in the Lake District.

=== Casting ===
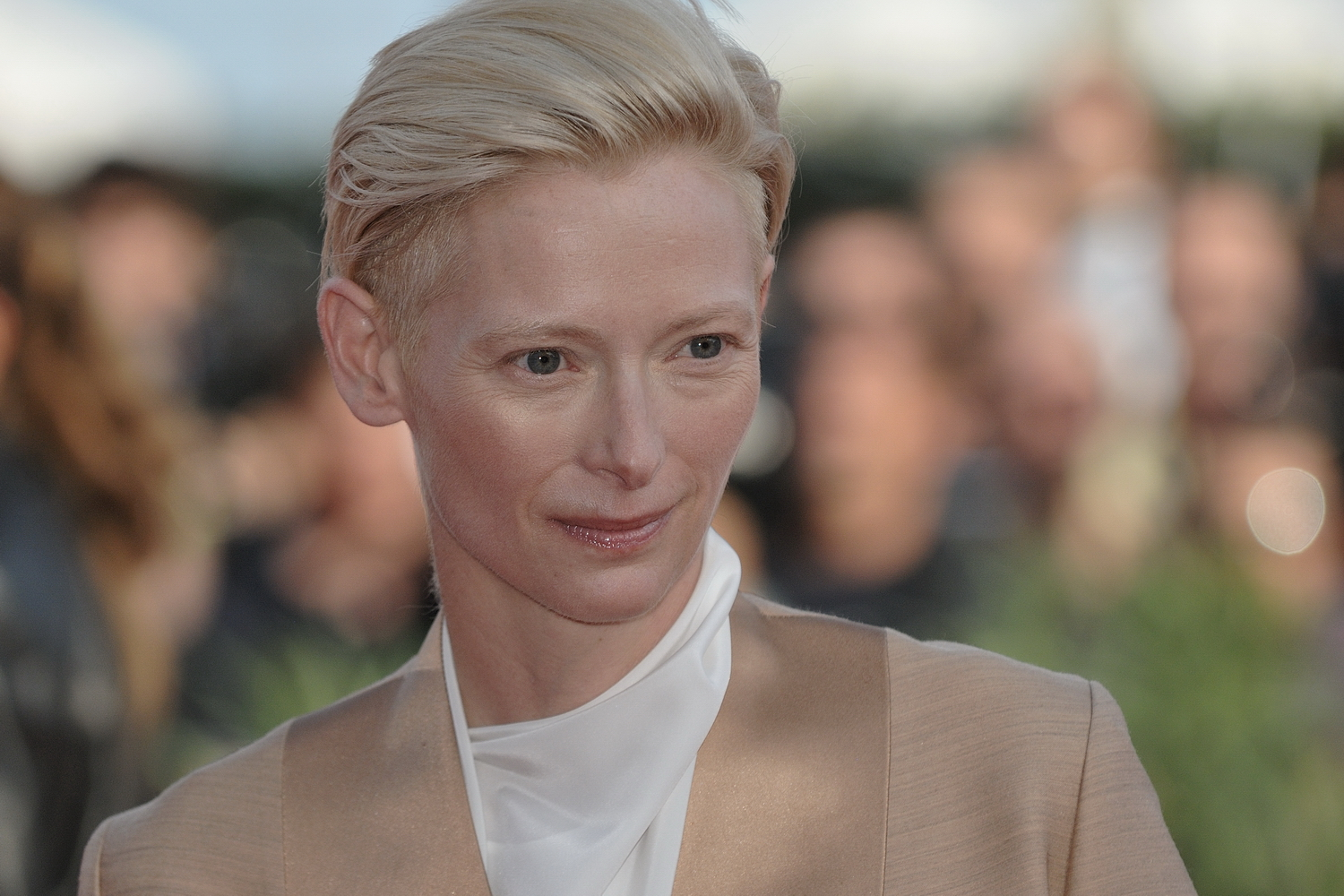
Russell originally offered the part of Lady Sylvia Marsh to Tilda Swinton (pictured), but she declined.

According to executive producer Ireland, Russell originally wanted to cast Tilda Swinton in the role of Lady Sylvia Marsh, but she turned down the role after reading the script. Amanda Donohoe was cast instead. Ireland also claimed that Russell made the film partly as a tribute to Oscar Wilde.

Donohoe says Russell sent her a script with a note reading: "I don't know if you'll be interested in this little bit of nonsense but please read it anyway." She read it and agreed to play Lady Sylvia because, she said, it gave her "the opportunity to play a woman who is basically a fantasy woman. There are no boundaries. Therefore, I could do exactly as I chose with that lady.... I didn't want her to be some sort of vampire bimbo. I really wanted her to be a sort of incredibly sophisticated and ageless woman."

"I always admire someone who really dares to be bad", said Donohoe of Russell. "Even his actors—people like Oliver Reed—have always impressed me that way. They can be brilliant or perfectly dreadful, but they're never boring. I'm fairly serious about acting and integrity, that films should have some real vrumph to them and say something about life. And I'd just been on this string of films and television films in the last two years, all pretty heavy stuff, and I thought 'Well, why not do a film that doesn't mean anything at all?'"

Russell said Vestron wanted an American name and suggested Catherine Oxenberg, who had been in Dynasty. Russell agreed although he said Oxenberg refused to be naked in the final sacrifice sequence, insisting on doing it in her underwear. Russell later wrote "being of royal lineage, she opted for Harrods' silk but as we were a low budget movie she had to be content with Marks and Spencer's cotton – and very fetching she was too."

It was one of Hugh Grant's first films and Ireland says Grant was "embarrassed by it" in later years. "I'm not sure if it was meant to be horrific or funny", Grant said shortly after the film was made. "When I saw it, I roared with laughter. As ever, I get to play a sort of upper-class young man. I have some exciting things to do: I get to slay a giant worm with a big sword, cutting it in half. Very, very symbolic stuff."

=== Filming ===
The film was shot on location and at Shepperton Film Studios in England over a seven-week period from mid-February to mid-April 1988. Additional photography took place in Wetton, Staffordshire.

Russell said it was a difficult shoot because "[s]pecial effects take forever to do, and we had to schedule things in such a way so that we didn't lose any time. Sometimes we'd have two crews shooting simultaneously on different soundstages: One was shooting on the shrine set with Catherine Oxenberg about to be sacrificed to the worm, while other, we were filming a convent of nuns about to be raped by a legion of centurions. Never a dull moment."

Referring to aspects of the movie's visual style, Slant Magazine's Budd Wilkins wrote: "Russell layers visual elements—faces, bodies, flames—into the video footage using chroma-key compositing, achieving a disorienting surrealist-collage effect".

"Ken loves danger", said Donohoe. "One day he came in and played a tape for me and Hugh Grant of a drawing room comedy with Noël Coward and Gertrude Lawrence. Afterwards, we just looked at him with blank faces and he said `That's the way I want you to play your scenes.' It was mad but inspired".

Russell insisted the film was a comedy. "Audiences don't realize my films are comedies until the last line has been delivered, and even then, most people don't appear to get the joke. I would like to state that I actively encourage the audience to laugh along with White Worm."

== Release and reception ==
=== Box office ===
The film premiered at the Montreal World Film Festival in Canada on 29 August 1988, and screened at the Toronto International Film Festival on 14 September 1988. In the United States, it screened at the Boston Film Festival on 16 September 1988. It was given a theatrical release through Vestron Pictures, premiering in New York City on 21 October 1988, where it grossed $22,155 during its opening weekend.

The film continued to open regionally throughout the remainder of the year, releasing in such cities as Seattle on 11 November 1988, and in Detroit and Hartford, Connecticut on 23 December 1988. Over the course of its theatrical run, the film earned a total of $1,189,315, and was regarded as a box-office flop at the time of its release.

=== Critical response ===
==== Contemporaneous ====
Roger Ebert gave it two stars out of four and called it "a respectable B-grade monster movie", while Variety deemed it "a rollicking, terrifying, post-psychedelic headtrip." Kevin Thomas of the Los Angeles Times wrote that the film's "far-from-serious aura allows Russell to get away with some hilariously cut-rate visions of hell, various Christian-pagan conflicts and lurid Freudian symbolism", but felt that its contemporary setting, though allowing for anachronism, would have "benefited considerably from the period quaintness of 1911, the year in which Stoker, creator of Dracula, wrote it". LA Weekly's Helen Knode felt the film's themes and screenplay were lackluster, but conceded that it was still "scary, funny, gorgeously hued light entertainment".

Robin Fields and Jacquelin Sufak of the Chicago Tribune praised the film for its use of deadpan humour as well as for Donohoe's performance, adding: "Lair may be a bit more palatable as a whole than most of Russell's efforts, but that doesn't mean the film is easily digested. An impaled eyeball, a dinner of pickled earthworms in aspic and a hallucinatory sequence involving the rape of nuns keep viewers from resting too easily: This is a Ken Russell film, after all."

Malcolm L. Johnson of the Hartford Courant awarded the film a two out of four-star rating, but felt the film paled in comparison with Russell's previous works, noting that the film "has its humorous moments, and its aftermath is subtle and chilling, in a droll way, though only a diehard devotee could describe this new piece of Russell-mania as totally successful". Linnea Lannon of the Detroit Free Press praised Donohoe's performance as "deliciously funny", but deemed Oxenberg as "awful", adding that the film ultimately only has appeal for ardent fans of Russell.

==== Retrospective assessment ====
In the years following its release, The Lair of the White Worm developed a cult following. Russell himself commented that the film had acquired a following in Australia and other countries, "but not in Merrie England, where our dour-faced critics insisted on taking it seriously. How on earth can you take seriously the vision of Catherine Oxenberg, dressed in Marks & Spencer's underwear, being sacrificed to a fake, phallic worm two hundred feet long?"

Assessing the film in his book Nightmare Movies (2011), film critic Kim Newman described it as "Russell turn[ing] his chainsaw at Bram Stoker's worst novel". Peter Walker of The Guardian deemed the film a personal "guilty pleasure" whose "defiant disrespect for plot and taste win me over... Badly shot, clumsily edited and seemingly scored by a teenage boy who has just taken delivery of his first synthesiser and then pressed all the buttons one by one, the film has a peculiarly jarring tone. Ostensibly making a gothic horror, Russell repeatedly undermines the mood with moments of absurdity – some deliberate, many not".

Rob Hunter of Film School Rejects wrote in a 2017 retrospective review The Lair of the White Worm is "probably the most accessible" film of Russell's career, noting that he "infuses what could have been a familiar genre setup with wit, sex, and blasphemous imagery, but as nutty as elements of it become the core simplicity of heroes fighting to save their small village from an ancient evil remains." Budd Wilkins, writing for Slant Magazine in 2017, compared the film to The Blood on Satan's Claw (1971), another film in which the unearthing of an inhuman skull unleashes evil forces, adding that it features elements of the folk horror subgenre.

On the review aggregator website Rotten Tomatoes, 68% of 31 critics' reviews are positive. Metacritic, which uses a weighted average, assigned the film a score of 61 out of 100, based on 17 critics, indicating "generally favorable" reviews.

=== Home media ===
The Lair of the White Worm was first made available for home media by Vestron Video, who distributed a VHS in North America in May 1989. On 19 August 2003, Artisan Entertainment released the film on DVD. Vestron Home Entertainment released the film for the first time on Blu-ray in 2017 through their Vestron Video Collector's Series line.

In October 2022, the film was made available for digital streaming by The Criterion Collection on their online streaming service, The Criterion Channel.

== Proposed sequel ==
Donohoe stated that there was some talk of a sequel, but it was never made.
