= Maggie May (folk song) =

Traditional folk song from Liverpool, England

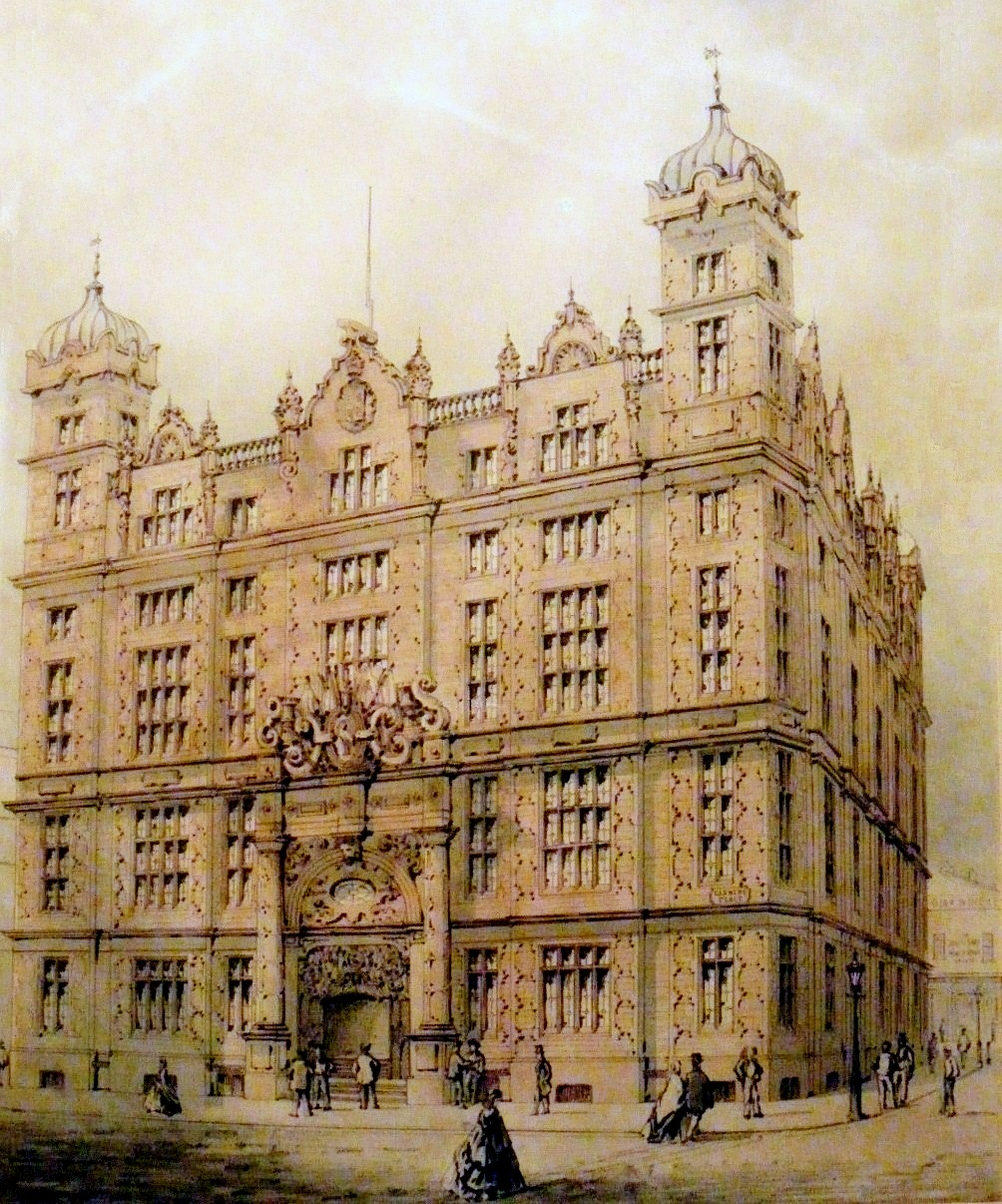
The Liverpool Sailors' Home in Canning Place, c. 1860. The sailor is "paid off at the Home" and meets Maggie "cruising up and down" the square. In one version of the lyrics she is wearing a "crin-o-line", the bell-shaped dress worn by the woman in the foreground.

"Maggie May" (or "Maggie Mae") (Roud No. 1757) is a traditional Liverpool folk song about a prostitute who robbed a "homeward bounder", a sailor coming home from a round trip.

John Manifold, in his Penguin Australian Song Book, described it as "A foc'sle song of Liverpool origin apparently, but immensely popular among seamen all over the world". It became widely circulated in a skiffle version from the late 1950s.

In 1964, the composer and lyricist Lionel Bart used the song and its backstory as the basis of a musical set around the Liverpool Docks. The show, also called Maggie May, ran for two years in London. In 1970, a truncated version of the song performed by the Beatles was included on their album Let It Be.

== Lyrics ==
As with most folk songs, the lyrics exist in many variant forms. The song specifies several real streets in Liverpool, notably Lime Street in the centre of the city.

The Beatles' version, arranged by John Lennon, Paul McCartney, George Harrison and Ringo Starr, is as follows:

Oh, dirty Maggie Mae they have taken her away
And she'll never walk down Lime Street anymore
Oh, the judge, he guilty found her
For robbin' the homeward bounder
That dirty, no good, robbin' Maggie Mae
'Tis the port of Liverpool
They returned me to
Two pounds ten a week, that was my pay.

In the most established version, it is sung in the first person by a sailor who has come home to Liverpool from Sierra Leone. He is paid off for the trip. With his wages in his pocket, he sees Maggie "cruising up and down old Canning Place". She had "a figure so divine" (either "like a frigate of the line" or with "a voice so refined"). He picks her up and she takes him home to her lodgings. When he awakes the following morning, she has taken all his money and even his clothes, insisting that they are in "Kelly's locker", a pawn shop. When he fails to find his clothes in the pawn shop, he contacts the police. She is found guilty of theft and sentenced to transportation to Botany Bay.

While the most famous version of the chorus contains the line "she'll never walk down Lime Street any more", Stan Hugill in his Shanties from the Seven Seas writes that in different versions several streets are named, referring to different historical red light areas of Liverpool, including Paradise Street, Peter Street and Park Lane.

The Beatles refer to currency in the old £sd system; "Two pounds ten" means two pounds sterling and ten shillings.

== History ==
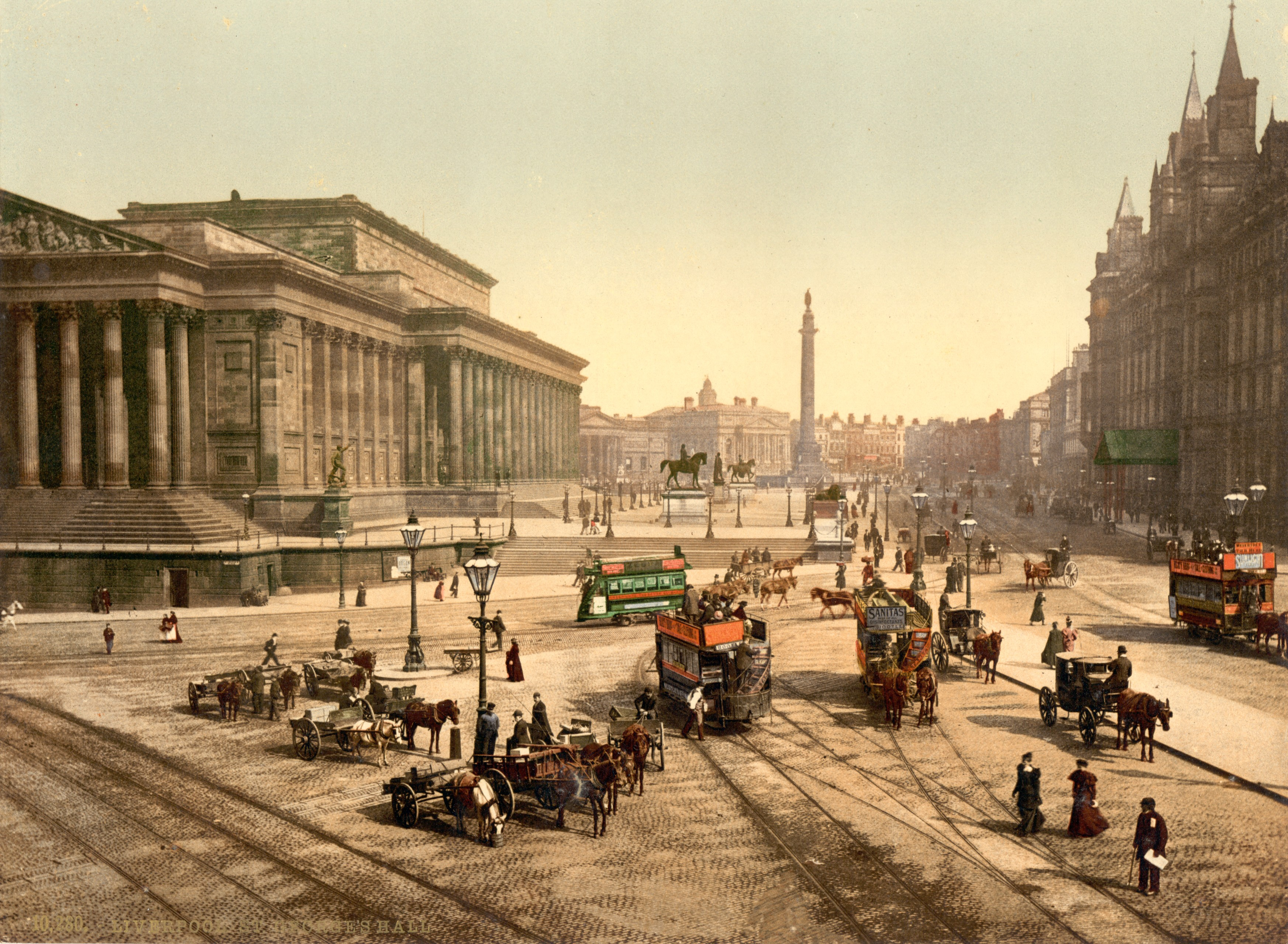
Lime Street in the 1890s, with St. George's Hall on the left and the Great North Western Hotel on the right

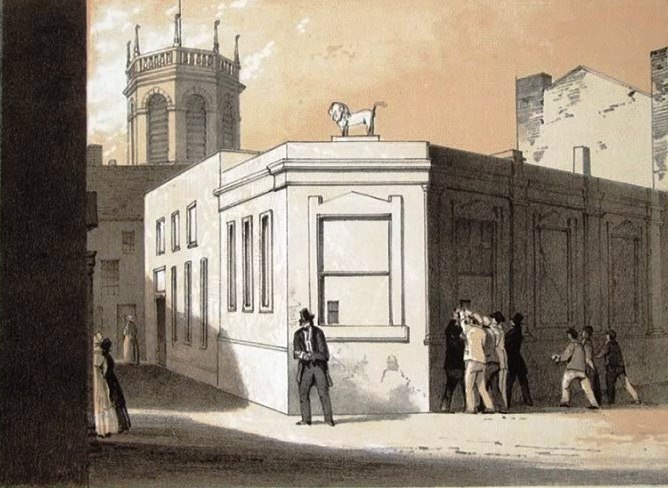
Canning Place in 1843

=== Origins ===
British sea music historian Stan Hugill writes of an early reference to the song in the diary of Charles Picknell, a sailor on the female-convict ship Kains that sailed to Van Diemen's Land in 1830. This indicates that versions of the song date back to the actual period of penal transportation mentioned in the lyrics as Maggie's fate. In the earliest known version, the protagonist is "charming Nellie Ray", who may have been a real transported prostitute and thief. The chorus is "Oh! my charming Nellie Ray, They have taken you away, You have gone to Van Dieman's cruel shore: For you've skinned so many tailors, And you've robbed so many sailors, That we'll look for you in Peter Street no more".

The historical relation of the song to the 1856 American slave song "Darling Nellie Gray" published as the work of Benjamin Hanby is unclear. The tune is very similar and the chorus of Hanby's song contains the lines "Oh, my darling Nellie Gray, they have taken you away, I'll never see my darling anymore". It's possible that Hanby's tune was adopted to the existing words. The same tune is used for the Geordie song "Keep yor feet still Geordie hinny" to words by Joe Wilson.

=== Recordings ===
"Maggie May" was widely performed in the late 1950s, and was adapted to the skiffle craze of the era. In this period Lime Street was established as her favoured haunt. A. L. Lloyd recorded it in 1956 on the album English Drinking Songs, describing it in the liner notes as "last fling of sailor balladry. It is a song that has found its way into every ship but none of the songbooks." Liz Winters and Bob Cort released a skiffle version in 1957. The Vipers Skiffle Group also released a version in that year. This became the best-known recording at the time, but it was banned by BBC Radio on its release because of the sexual content of the lyrics. Stan Kelly also sang a version on his 1958 EP Liverpool Packet.

The Lionel Bart version in the 1964 musical uses the traditional tune, but changes the lyrics somewhat. It is sung in the third person and Maggie is transformed into a heroine whose departure from the streets is lamented ("some rotten Homeward Bounder has got his grip around her"). This version was performed by Kenneth Haigh in the original cast recording of the musical. The Bart version was regularly sung by Judy Garland, and was recorded by her on the Maggie May EP in 1964. The Beatles are known to have seen and discussed the Bart musical.

The song was also recorded by The Searchers and by Hughie Jones of The Spinners (Jones later claimed that the real Maggie May lived in Duke Street and died in 1952). It was also recorded in several albums of sea shanties, by Cyril Tawney, Bob Roberts and others.

== The Beatles' version ==
"Maggie Mae"

Song by the Beatles

from the album Let It Be
- Released: 8 May 1970
- Recorded: 24 January 1969
- Studio: Apple, London
- Genre: Skiffle
- Length: 0:40
- Label: Apple, EMI
- Songwriter: trad. arr. Lennon–McCartney–Harrison–Starkey
- Producer: Phil Spector

A brief extract was performed by the Beatles in a joking manner during their Get Back sessions, in early 1969, at a point in the proceedings when they were warming up in the studio by playing old rock and roll and skiffle songs that they had known and played in their teenage years. They adopt heavy scouse accents for the performance. A truncated version of it was included on the 1970 album drawn from those sessions, Let It Be, appearing as the last track on the LP's first side, immediately after the title song.

The version they performed was spelled "Maggie Mae" on the track listing and all four Beatles were credited as arrangers of the traditional song, thus allowing them to collect the writers' share of the publishing income for this public domain song. At 39 seconds long, it is the second-shortest song released on an official Beatles album (the shortest being "Her Majesty", at 23 seconds). It was also the first cover song to appear on an album since "Act Naturally" was recorded in June 1965 as the last recorded song for the group's album Help!

This song and "Dig It" appear on the Let It Be album, but are not included on the Let It Be... Naked album. Let It Be... Naked did include "Maggie Mae" on the bonus disc, "Fly on the Wall" at 17 minutes and 30 seconds. This extends beyond the 39 seconds included on the original Let it Be and segues at 54 seconds into "I Fancy Me Chances" as McCartney sings "Take it Maggie...oh, I fancy me chances with you".

The song had been a staple of the repertoire of the Quarrymen, the skiffle group formed by Lennon that evolved into the Beatles in 1960. Lennon was still making home recordings of the song shortly before his death in 1980. These instances demonstrate an important personal connection to the song for Lennon and may have contributed to the snippet being included on the album Let It Be.

The song appears twice in the 2010 biopic Nowhere Boy. First, it is played for a teenage John Lennon by his mother, Julia, and he then learns to play it himself, both on the four-string banjo. Later in the film the song is shown as the first one played by Lennon's band the Quarrymen, though this was not in fact their first public appearance. A performance by the cast (as "The Nowhere Boys") appears on the film's soundtrack album. This version of the song is credited to British musician and songwriter Wally Whyton.

The song is sung in the 2017 film Pirates of the Caribbean: Dead Men Tell No Tales, by a character named Uncle Jack, portrayed by McCartney.

=== Personnel ===
- John Lennon – vocal, acoustic guitar (Gibson J-200)
- Paul McCartney – vocal, acoustic guitar (Martin D-28)
- George Harrison – bass-line on electric guitar (Fender Telecaster)
- Ringo Starr – drums

Personnel per Ian MacDonald

== Other uses ==
Rod Stewart has said that this folk song inspired his 1971 hit single "Maggie May", which was number one in the United States, the United Kingdom, Australia and Canada.
