= Clarence M. Leumane =

English musician and writer

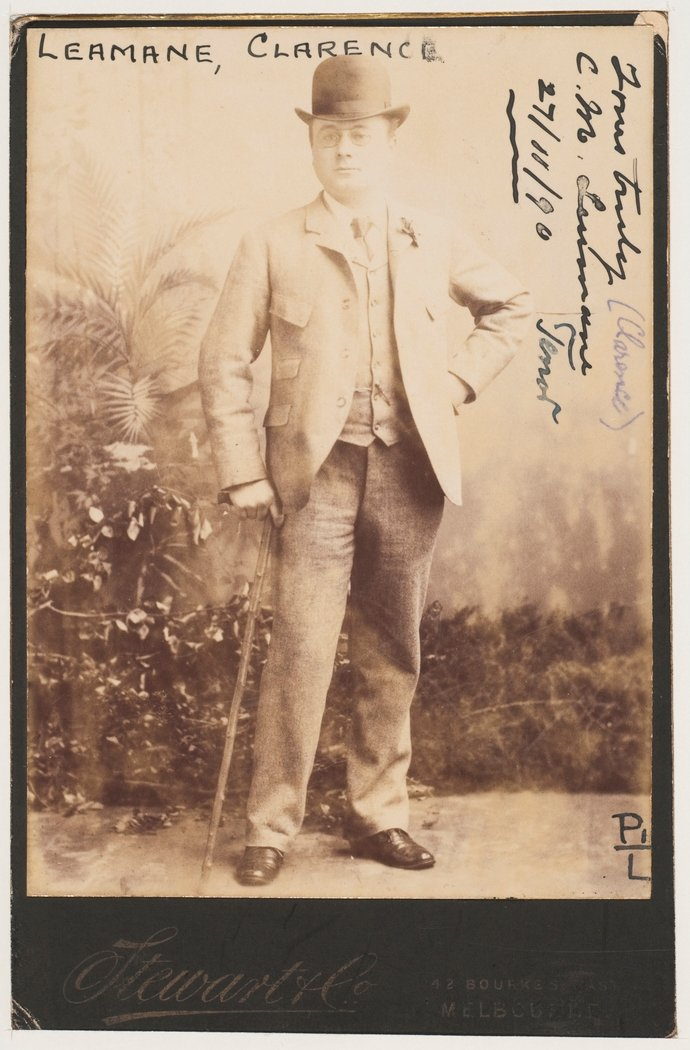
Clarence M. Leumane in 1890

Clarence M. "Jack" Leumane (died 23 February 1928) was an English-born singer, actor, songwriter and librettist. He played leading tenor roles in opera, especially the comic operas of Gilbert and Sullivan, in the 1880s, first in Britain and then Australia. He was also a librettist and writer of the song "The Lambton Worm" in 1867.

== Life ==
Leumane was born in England, possibly in the Sunderland area, as the words of the song "The Lambton Worm" are from the Mackem dialect.

As an actor, in the autumn of 1881, he created the role of Captain Harleigh in Claude Duval, a comic opera by Edward Solomon and Henry Pottinger Stephens, at London's Olympic Theatre. He then joined a tour of the D'Oyly Carte Opera Company from November 1881 to October 1882, playing the leading Gilbert and Sullivan tenor roles of Alexis in The Sorcerer, Ralph Rackstraw in H.M.S. Pinafore and Frederic in The Pirates of Penzance. In 1885, he appeared in London as Sir Lancelot in Dr. D, an English comic opera by C. P. Colnaghi and Cotsford Dick at the Royalty Theatre. One reviewer commented: "Mr. Leumane has a very pleasing tenor voice, and as Ralph Rackstraw he not merely sang well, but acted with an intelligence and point".

In 1887, as "C. H. Leumane", he made his first appearance in Australia with the J. C. Williamson Company in the leading Gilbert and Sullivan role of Prince Hilarion in the first Australian production Princess Ida. He continued with the company until 1890 in more Savoy Operas, as the Duke of Dunstable in Patience, Colonel Fairfax in The Yeomen of the Guard, and Marco in The Gondoliers. In between these productions, he also appeared in Australia as Geoffrey Wilder in Alfred Cellier's hit comic opera Dorothy, and was the title character in Gounod's Faust, including on the night in 1888, in Melbourne, when Frederick Federici died at the conclusion of the opera. He repeated his roles in the first New Zealand productions of Dorothy, Yeomen and Princess Ida in 1890. He played the title role in his own opera, Mathias, in 1901.

He remained in Australia and died in South Australia in 1928.

== Writings ==
The Lambton Worm is an old folk tale, similar to the tale of Saint George and the Dragon, going back centuries which was turned into a children's pantomime. As "C. M. Leumane", he wrote the song, and the pantomime was first performed at Tyne Theatre and Opera House, Newcastle upon Tyne in 1867. The song became a local anthem.

He is credited as librettist (with the music by Ernest Truman) for the opera Mathias, which is based on the story "Le Juif Polonais" (or The Polish Jew) by M.M. Erckmann-Chatrian. This Opera was given its world premiere at the Criterion Theatre, Sydney, on 26 July 1901 with Leumane also credited as the director, and with playing/singing the part of Mathias. Leumane is also credited as the lyricist of the 1909 one-act musical play Coward or hero?

Leumane’s name also appears as the writer of the words and music of a work entitled "Advance Australia", which is described as a chorale for voice and piano.

An old photograph is signed (vertically in the top right hand corner) "Yours truly C. M. Leumane 27/11/90".

== See also ==
Geordie dialect words
