= Imogen Claire =

British actress, dancer, choreographer (1943–2005)

- Born: Imogen Lee Crowe; 2 November 1943; England
- Died: 24 June 2005 (aged 61); England
- Occupations: Actor; dancer; choreographer; dance teacher
- Notable work: The Lair of the White Worm (1988); The Rocky Horror Picture Show (1975)
- Spouse: John Rothenberg (1992–2004)
- Parents: Kathleen Eden-Green; Antony Lee Crowe

Imogen Lee Claire (2 November 1943 – 24 June 2005), born Imogen Lee Crowe, was a British dancer, choreographer, actress, and dance teacher.

== Early life ==
Born in London in 1943, Claire was the second born daughter of Kathleen Eden-Green and Antony Lee Crowe. She had one older sister and a younger brother and sister. Her parents had married in 1938. Her mother was a schoolmistress, and her father was a graduate student working on a thesis. She was educated at the Royal Ballet School and the London Dance Theatre. In the autumn of 1961, the Dancing Times reported Imogen Crowe as a notable Royal Ballet School leaver who had passed her Advanced Royal Academy of Dance exams with a commendation.

== Career ==
As a dancer, Claire gained leading roles in the 1960s. In 1963, as Imogen Crowe, she appeared as Terpsichore in the first English production of the Stravinsky ballet Apollo, choreographed by Balanchine, opposite Maximo Barra as Apollo. It opened at the Royalty Theatre, Chester, on 9 November and then went on tour.

In 1970, Claire played Lucretia Borgia on stage in The Council of Love, with Warren Mitchell as Satan. Ken Russell then recruited her for minor roles in his films, beginning with three in 1971, The Music Lovers, The Devils, and The Boy Friend. She appeared in other Russell films such well as The Lair of the White Worm (1988).

In the theatre Claire worked several times with Philip Prowse, as an actor, dancer and choreographer. Her final film was Billy Elliot (2000).

Claire taught for two years at the Drama Centre London. In 1994, she was the first choreographer elected to the council of the union Equity and originated several dance initiatives, including the Dance Passport (2000) and new insurance plans for dancers. She was elected for the last time in 2004. On 24 June 2005, Claire died from cancer at Westminster. At the time of her death, she was living in Linden Gardens, off Notting Hill Gate, Kensington.

== Personal life ==
In 1977, while appearing as a Cabaret Girl in a revival of Tales from the Vienna Woods at the National Theatre, Claire met stage manager John Rothenberg. They lived together through the 1980s and were married in 1992. Rothenberg, who was 15 years her senior, died in 2004.

== Films ==
- The Music Lovers (1971) as Lady in White
- The Devils (1971) as Nun
- The Boy Friend (1971) as dancer
- Savage Messiah (1972), as Mavis Coldstream
- Henry VIII and His Six Wives (1972) as Maria de Salinas
- Mahler (1974)
- Tommy (1975) as Specialist's Nurse
- Lisztomania (1975) as George Sand
- The Rocky Horror Picture Show (1975) as Transylvanian
- Valentino (1977)
- Hussy (1980) as Imogen
- Shock Treatment (1981) as Wardrobe Misstress
- Flash Gordon (1980) as Special Movement
- Caravaggio (1986) as Lady with the Jewels
- The Lair of the White Worm (1988) as Dorothy Trent
- Salome's Last Dance (1988) as Second Nazarean
- Prisoner of Honor (1991) as cabaret singer
- Hotel Splendide (2000) as Edna Blanche
- Billy Elliot (2000) as dance examiner

== Television ==
- Star Maidens (1976) as Doctor
- Clouds of Glory (1978) as Spectre
- Lovejoy (1985) as Stall Holder
