= J. W. Myers =

American singer

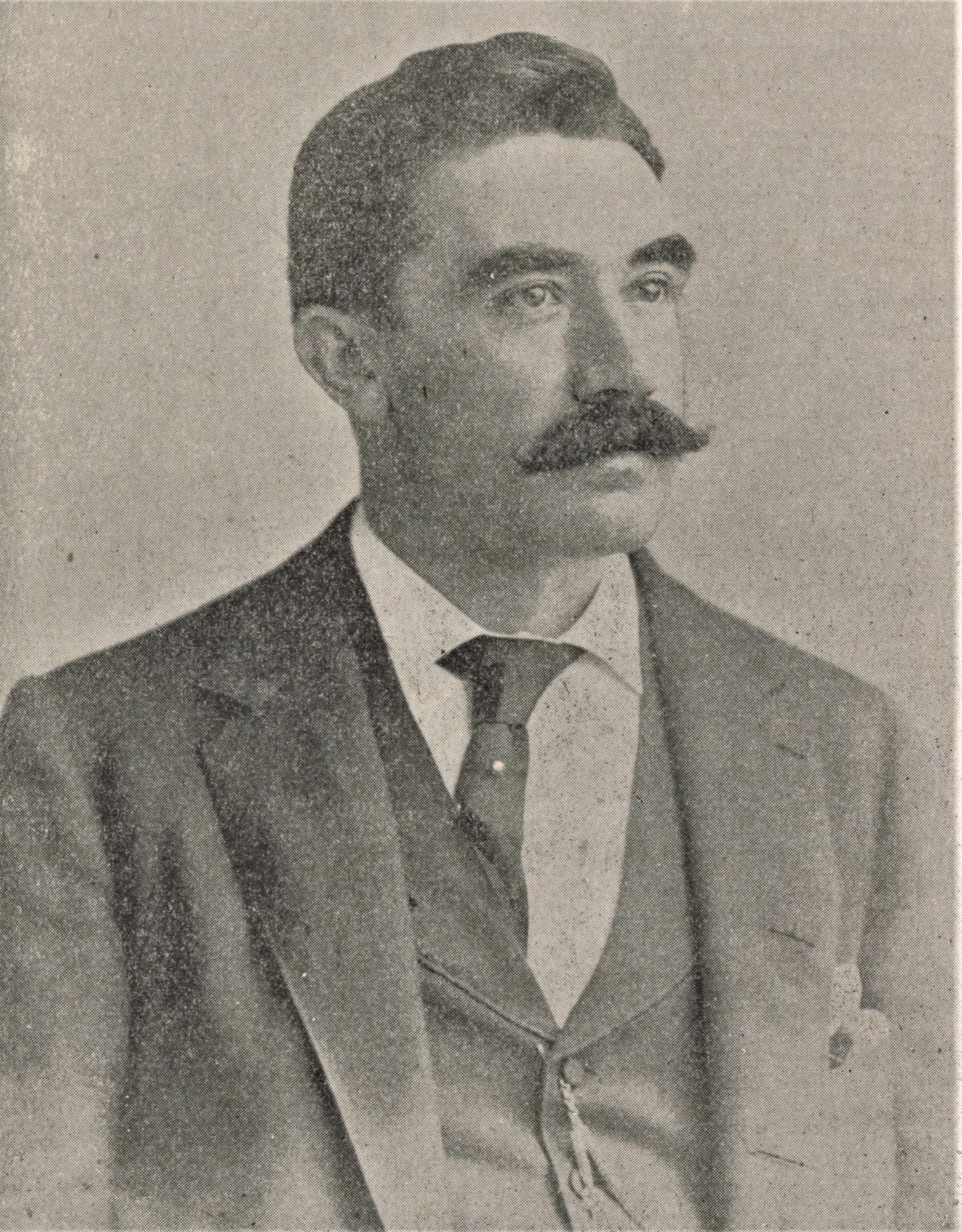
- Myers, 1893

Background information
- Born: c. 1864; Wales, U.K.
- Died: c. 1919 Wales, U.K.
- Genres: Pop; Folk
- Occupation: Vocalist
- Years active: 1890–1917

"My Darling Nelly Gray" sung by J. W. Myers in 1904

John W. Myers (c. 1864 – c. 1919), who was usually credited as J. W. Myers, was a Welsh-American baritone singer, who recorded widely in the United States between the early 1890s and early 1917. His recordings, including "Two Little Girls in Blue" (1893), "The Sidewalks of New York" (1895), "Just Tell Them That You Saw Me" (1895), "When You Were Sweet Sixteen" (1901), "On a Sunday Afternoon" (1902), "Way Down In Old Indiana" (1902), and "In the Good Old Summer Time" (1902), were among the most popular of the period.

== Biography ==
Little is known of his life, although he is believed to have been born in Wales and emigrated to the US at the age of 12 in the 1870s. He worked at various jobs before becoming a theatre manager in New York City. By 1892, he was identified as an already seasoned recording artist, suggesting that he may have first recorded as early as 1890.

His first successful recordings were in 1892. He became regarded as "the foremost baritone ballad singer of his era", and over his career he recorded probably hundreds of songs for many phonograph cylinder recording companies, including New Jersey Phonograph (later known as the United States Phonograph Company), Edison, Columbia, Berliner, and Victor. In 1895 he resigned from his position in the theatre in order to join a touring opera, and in 1896 set up his own short-lived cylinder company, the Globe Talking Machine Company.

Many of his recordings after 1900 were for Columbia Records. He also continued to record for Victor, Edison and Leeds & Catlin. Several were of songs made popular in Broadway musicals, such as "In the Good Old Summer Time" from The Defender, while others such as "Come Take A Trip In My Air-Ship" referenced modern technology.

After 1907, Myers' recording activity diminished. He invested in another recording company, the U.S. Everlasting Cylinder Company of Cleveland, Ohio, and recorded three cylinders for them, released in the first half of 1912. The listings refer to his recent concert tour, Canadian tour and eastern US vaudeville tour. He recorded at least four vertical discs for Rex Records in 1913-14. His last record for Columbia, Along the Yukon Trail, was issued in December 1914. In 1916-17 he recorded four titles for Victor H. Emerson's new Emerson records. He must have known Victor Emerson back in the early 1890s when he was head of the New Jersey Cylinder recording studio. The last known recording is 'War Song Medley'. His life after that time is unknown; researcher Jim Walsh suggested that he may have died around 1919, although it is also possible that he returned to Wales.
