= The Pitman's Courtship =

Song

Song by William Mitford
- Language: English (Geordie)
- Written: c. 1816
- Songwriter(s): William Mitford

The Pitman's Courtship is a famous Geordie folk song written in the 19th century by William Mitford, in a style deriving from music hall. This piece takes a humorous look at the courtship of a Pitman and his lass where the discussion forms the proposal of marriage and the couple's plans for a life together. This song was generally considered to be one of the region's finest 'traditional' songs, one of only a handful of Tyneside songs to be appreciated outside the region in its day.

== Lyrics ==
The earliest appearance of the song is in the budget chapbook "Newcastle Songster" series in 1816.

Quite soft blue the wind fra the West,
An'the sun faintly shone i' the sky,
When Lukey an' Bessy sat courtin'
As waaking I chanc'd for to spy;
Unheeded, Aa stole up behind them;
To hear thor discourse was me plan
Aa listen'd each word they wor sayin',
When Lukey hes courtship began

Chorus:
Fal the dal dal the dal dad-i-dy,
Fal the dal dal the dal day

Last hoppen' thou wun up my fancy,
Wi' thy fine silken jacket o' blue;
An' smash, if thor Newcassel lyedies
Cud marrow the corls o' thi broo;
That day aw whiles danc'd wi' lang Nancy
She cuddent like thoo lift hor heel;
Ma grandy lik'd spice singin' hinnies,
Maw comely, aw like thoo as weel.

Chorus

Tha' knaas, ivvor since we wor little
Thegither we've rang'd through the woods,
At neet hand in hand toddled hyem,
Varry oft wi' howl kites an' torn duds;
But noo we can taak aboot marridge,
An' lang sair for wor weddin' day;
When married thoo's keep a bit shop
An' sell things iv a huikstery way.

Chorus

An' te get ur a canny bit leeven',
A' kinds o' fine sweetmeats we'll sell,
Reed-harrin, broon-syep, an' mint-candy,
Black-pepper, dye-sand, an' sma' yell;
Spice-hunters, pick-shafts, farden candles,
Wax-dollies wi' reed leather shoes,
Chaak pussy-cats, fine corly-greens,
Papor-skyets, penny-pies, an' Yul-Doos.

Chorus

Awse help thoo te tie up thi shuggar,
At neets, when fra wark aw get lowse,
An' wor Dick 'at leeves ower High Whickham,
He'll myek us broom buzzoms for nowse.
Like an image thoo'll stand ower the coonter,
Wi thi fine muslin, cambricker goon,
An' te let the fokes see thoo's a lyedy,
On a cuddy thoo's ride te the Toon.

Chorus

Thor'll be matches, pipe-clay, an' broon dishes,
Canary-seed, raisins, an' fegs;
An' te please the pit-laddies at Easter,
A dish full o' gilty pyest-eggs.
Wor neybors that's snuffers an' smoakors,
For wor snuff an' backey they'll seek;
An' te show them we deal wi' Newcassel,
Twee Blackeys sal mense the door-cheek.

Chorus

Sae, noo for Tim Bodkin awse send,
Te darn me silk breeks at the knee,
Thoo thy ruffles an' frills mun get ready
Next Whissunday married we'll be.
Noo aw think it's high time te be steppin',
We've sitten tive aw's aboot lyem."
So then, wiv a kiss an' a cuddle
These lovers they bent thor ways hyem.

Chorus

== Melody ==
"Traditional Air"

== Comments on variations between different versions ==
There are various published versions of the song, and probably due to the fact that many early versions were published on Chapbooks and consequently less care was taken in the details, spelling, etc., some seem to have difficulties in following the original Geordie dialect. Here are some of the variations:

- "wor" is written in some versions as "wour" and "were"
- "hor" is spelt variously as "her"
- "Aw" is often written as "Aa'”
- "fra" may be written "fFrae"
- "Te" is often written as "To"
- "awd" may be written "aud"
- "mairridge" may be used as the spelling for "marridge,”
- "thou" may be written "thou"
- "Grandy" can be spelt "Granny"
- "folk", "foke" and "foak" are interchanged
- Verse 1 line 5 may be completely different as "Unheeded I stole beside them"
- Verse 7 line 5 may be different as "Aw think it's boot time we waur steppin',”
- Verse 7 line 8 may be completely different as "These lovers they toddelt off hyem."

== Recordings ==
- "The Pitman's Courtship" from the CD "Graeme Danby sings stories from the North East" and "The Pitman's Courtship" from the CD "Come you not from Newcastle? – Newcastle songs volume 1" – which is one of 20 CD's in the boxed set Northumbria Anthology (Listen on ) – both from Mawson Wareham Music, MWM Records, 14 Cobblestone Court, Walker Rd Newcastle upon Tyne, NE6 1AB

Also

- A sample to listen to by Graeme Danby –(Listen on )

== See also ==
- Geordie dialect words
