= The Cliffs of Old Tynemouth =

Song

Song
- Language: English (Geordie)
- Written: 1843
- Songwriter(s): David Ross Lietch

"The Cliffs of Old Tynemouth" is a Geordie folk song written in the 19th century by David Ross Lietch. This song is a ballad, romanticising about one of the tourist sights of the Tyneside area.

== Lyrics ==
This song appears in a small pamphlet or chapbook being Number 2 of a series appearing to consist of only 3, forming a series of 'Shields' songs. They were published in the 1850s by the Shields Gazette editor, William Brockie. The songs reflect the towns of Cullercoats, Tynemouth, North Shields and South Shields, small coastal towns on both sides of the Tyne. All are variously famous for fishwives, press gangs, ships, boats and sailors, and beautiful scenery. The song was written in 1843.

"The Cliffs of Old Tynemouth" To the tune of the Irish Air “The Meeting of the Waters”:

Oh! the Cliffs of Old Tynemouth they're wild and they're sweet,
And dear are the waters that roll at their feet;
And the old ruined Abbey, it ne'er shall depart;
Tis the star of my fancy, the home of my heart.

Tis the star of my fancy, etc.

Oh! 'twas there that my childhood fled cheerful and gay,
There I loitered the morning of boyhood away,
And now as I wander the old beach alone,
The waves seem to whisper the names that are gone.

The waves seem to whisper etc.

Twas there with my Alice I walked hand-in-hand,
While the wild waves in moonlight leapt o'er the bright sand;
And sweet were the echoes of the dark Cliffs above,
But oh! sweeter her voice as she murmured her love.

But oh, sweeter her voice etc.

On thy waters, Old Tynemouth, throng seamen as brave
As e'er cheer'd in the battle, or conquer'd the wave;
And for sweet pretty maidens, seek England around,
Near the Cliffs of Old Tynemouth the fairest are found.

Near the Cliffs of Old Tynemouth etc.

Other lands may be fairer, but nought can be seen,
Like the shore where our first love and boyhood have been;
Oh! give me the Cliffs and the wild roaring sea
The Cliffs of old Tynemouth for ever for me.

The Cliffs of old Tynemouth etc.

Tune: "The meeting of the waters".

== Places mentioned in the song ==
- Tynemouth is the town at the mouth of the River Tyne
- Rocks may refer to the “Black Midden rocks" which over the years have claimed numerous ships attempting to sail into the Tyne.
- Abbey refers to the Tynemouth Priory originally built by Oswald, King and saint of Northumbria in 637 A.D.

== Comments on variations to the above version ==
- In the early 19th century, as today, there were cheap books and magazines.
- Many of these “Chapbooks” were on poor quality paper to a poor standard and with poor quality print. The works were copied with no thoughts of copyright, and the work required very little proof-reading, and what was done was not required to a high standard. Consequently, the dialect words of songs varied between editions.
- This particular song shows several variations between the various published versions, some very minor, mainly in the spelling of the words, some are interpretation of the dialect, some down to simple mistakes, and sometimes there are variations within the same edition. Some of the most common are listed below :
- Verse 1, Line 3 - ruin'd and ruined
- Verse 1, Line 4 - alternatives are "Tis the joy of my fancy" or "Tis the star of my fancy"
- Verse 3, Line 2 - alternatives are "o'er the bright sand" and "o'er the bright strand"
- Verse 3, Line 3 - alternatives are "And sweet were the echoes, the dark Cliffs above” and "And sweet were the echoes of the dark Cliffs above,"
- Verse 3, Line 4 - alternatives are "But sweeter her voice" or "But oh!, sweeter her voice" (with or without an exclamation mark)
- Verse 5, Line 1 - alternatives are "but naught can be seen" or "-- naught can be seen"
- Verse 5, Line 1 - nought often spelt naught
- Verse 5, Line 2 - alternatives are "Like the place where our first love" or "Like the shore where our first love"
- Verse 5, Line 3 - alternates are "Oh! give me the rocks" or "Oh! give me the Cliffs"

== Recordings ==
- MWM Records website. The version performed by soprano Sheila Armstrong is set to a different tune. The CD “The Day We Went To The Coast - Around Cullercoats Bay” (ref MWMCDSP35) which includes “The Cliffs of Old Tynemouth” together with 13 other titles - (http://www.mawson-wareham.com/player.php?play=mwmcdsp3506&tkid=664&aid=0&pid=101).

== See also ==
Geordie dialect words
