= Thinking (poem) =

Poem by Walter D. Wintle

"Thinking" is a poem written by Walter D. Wintle, a poet who lived in the late 19th and early 20th century. Little to nothing is known about any details of his life. "Thinking" is also known as "The Man Who Thinks He Can".

In the 20th century, different versions of the poem have been published. To this date, it is unknown which version correctly represents the original version, but it is strongly believed that the version below, published at least as early as 1905 ("Unity" College Magazine), embodies the original and unaltered poem. The exact date of the first, original publication of "Thinking" is unknown.

== Publications ==
Early publications of this poem - citing Walter D. Wintle as being the author - include:

1905 - Unity
Published in 1905 by Unity Tract Society, Unity School of Christianity
Called "Thinking", by Walter D. Wintle

1916 - Ohio Educational Monthly
Published in 1916 by Ohio Education Association
Called "Thinking", by Walter Wintle

1927 - The World's Best-loved Poems - By James Gilchrist Lawson
Published in 1927 by Harper & Brothers
Called "Thinking", by Walter D. Wintle

1931 - Ethics notebook for nurses
Published in 1931 by Lippincott
Called "Thinking", by Walter Wintle

1937 - Think and Grow Rich, by Napoleon Hill
Published in 1937 by The Ralston Society
Poem written without any credits (anonymous author)

1940 - The Filipino Nurse
Published in 1940 by Philippine Nurses Association
Called "Thinking", by Walter Wintle

Later sources gave this poem, which originally carried the title "Thinking", the title "The Man Who Thinks He Can" and "It's All In The State Of Mind". In recent years the title "The Man Who Thinks He Can" has been adapted as the (wrongfully) assumed correct and original title.

== Poem ==
If you think you are beaten, you are;
If you think you dare not, you don't.
If you'd like to win, but you think you can't,
It is almost a cinch you won't.

If you think you'll lose, you've lost;
For out in this world we find
Success begins with a fellow's will
It's all in the state of mind.

If you think you're outclassed, you are;
You've got to think high to rise.
You've got to be sure of yourself before
You can ever win the prize.

Life's battles don't always go
To the stronger or faster man;
But sooner or later the man who wins
Is the man who thinks he can!

The Little Things & Such: Motivational Poems You Know and Love Now with Reflection Questions by Roger Edwardo

== Sources ==
- Unity, 1905 edition, by Unity Tract Society, Unity School of Christianity
- The Filipino Nurse (newsletter), 1940-1941 edition, by Philippine Nurses Association
- Think and Grow Rich, Napoleon Hill, 1937, published by The Ralston Society
