= Keep yor feet still Geordie hinny =

Song with lyrics by Joe Wilson

"Keep yor feet still! Geordey, hinny"

Song
- Language: English (Geordie)
- Written: c. 1856
- Published: c. 1858
- Composer: Unknown (based on "Nelly Gray")
- Lyricist: Joe Wilson

"Keep yor feet still! Geordey, hinny" (Roud 6862) is a famous Geordie comic song written in the 19th century by Joe Wilson, in a style deriving from music hall. Though the words were by Wilson, it is to be sung to the existing tune of "Nelly Gray" (also used for the Liverpool song "Maggie May")

== Topic ==
At the time, many working men, particularly in the building and civil engineering trades, worked away from home. These were the labourers and navvies who built the railways and canals. They arranged for "digs" wherever the work was, and in most cases, because of the costs and savings available, they slept two or more to a bed. This song features two such Geordies who share a bed in a lodging house. One, Bob Johnson, is very unhappy with his mate Geordie for waking him up when in the middle of a dream about an elusive young maiden from back home, of whom he has high hopes. His dreams are disrupted at the end of each verse by the fidgeting “Geordie”.

== Lyrics ==
Joe Wilson was probably the most prolific of the Geordie songwriters of the time. Many of his works were published in his book of Songs and Drolleries.

This version is as follows:

KEEP YOUR FEET STILL, GEORDIE HINNY
Air (or Teun) – “My Darling Nellie Grey”

Wor Geordey an' Bob Jonsin byeth lay i' one bed,
Iv a little lodgjin hoose that's doon the shore,
Before Bob had been an' oor asleep, a kick frae Geordey's fut
Myed him wakin up to roar instead o' snore.

KORUS

Keep yor feet still! Geordey, hinny, let's be happy for the neet,
For aw maynt be se happy throo the day.
So give us that bit cumfort, --keep yor feet still, Geordey lad,
An' dinnet send maw bonny dreams away!"

Aw dreamt thor was a dancin held, an' Mary Clark wes there;
An' aw thowt we tript it leetly on the floor,
An' aw prest her heevin breest te mine when walsin roond the room,
That's mair than aw dor ivor de before.

KORUS-- Keep yor feet still! Geordey, hinny, let's be happy for the neet, &c

Ye'll knaw the lad that she gans with, they call him Jimmy Green,
Aw thowt he tried te spoil us i' wor fun,
But aw dreamt aw nail'd him heavy, an' blackt the big feul's eyes;
If aw'd slept it's hard to tell what aw wad deun.

KORUS-- Keep yor feet still! Geordey, hinny, let's be happy for the neet, &c

Aw thowt aw set her hyem that neet, content we went alang.
Aw kiss'd her lips a hundred times or mair,
An' aw wish'd the road wad nivor end, se happy like wes aw,
Aw cud waak'd a thoosind miles wi' Mary there!

KORUS-- Keep yor feet still! Geordey, hinny, let's be happy for the neet, &c

Aw dremt Jim Green had left the toon an' left his luv te me,
An' aw thowt the hoose wis furnish'd wi' the best,
An' aw dreamt aw just had left the church wi' Mary be me side,
When yor clumsy feet completely spoil'd the rest."

KORUS—Keep yor feet still! Geordey, hinny, let's be happy for the neet, &c

== Recordings ==
- Owen Brannigan (1908-1973) was one of England's most popular bass singers in his day. His EP entitled Folk Songs From Northumbria (ref 7EG 8551 ) included the song with 6 other titles
- Cushie Butterfield & Keep Your Feet Still Geordie Hinnie, performed by Geordie Wilson at The Tranzac on YouTube
- Alan Price recorded the song on "Geordie Roots And Branches" (MWM Records 1982).

== See also ==
Geordie dialect words
