= David Ross Lietch =

David Ross Lietch (c1809-1881) was a 19th-century Tyneside born poet and songwriter. His most famous song is the ballad "The Cliffs of Old Tynemouth".

== Life ==
Lietch was born c1809 at North Shields, the second son of Rev William Lietch. For some years he practised on Tyneside as a physician having gained his degree at the University of Edinburgh.

He published "Poetic Fragments", a volume of poetry in 1838 and founded the North Shields newspaper, "The Port of Tyne Pilot" which was published 1839-42 under his ownership.

He retired to the Lake District in the late 1840s, where he famously corresponded with William Wordsworth.

He died on 16 August 1881, and was buried in Crosthwaite Churchyard, Keswick, Cumberland, not far from the grave of Robert Southey.

== Family ==
Lietch was the second son of Rev William Lietch who was a Presbyterian minister. An article in the local paper describes a dinner given in Seaton Sluice to "the Rev William Lietch of North Shields" at which he was presented with a gold watch inscribed "-----from his congregation and friends at Seaton Sluice, as a mark of esteem for him and his ministry during 34 years. 1837". Lietch had at least 7 siblings including William (died June, 1837), Barbara, Jane, Thomas Carr (a lawyer who became a solicitor, the first town clerk of Tynemouth and possibly Russian Vice Consul in Newcastle), Isabella, Robert, and Ellen.

He was also a schoolmaster, and founded the Albion Academy in North Shields.

The family always spelled their surname as Lietch but after the late 1800s it almost always appears in records as Leitch. However, some other publications appear to have mis-read the hand-written comment on a manuscript as "D Leutch"

Much of this information is from Mr Leitch's 3x great niece, Eleanor Clouter, of Canada.

== Works ==
These include :

- "The Cliffs of Old Tynemouth" – (not in local Geordie dialect - written c 1843 and to the tune of the Irish Air "The Meeting of the Waters".
- "Willie Green"- a ballad written in 1870 in the Cumbrian dialect.
- "Red Eric and Lord Delaval" – which is from "Poetic Fragments" and is one of his several "Tales of the Borders".

== See also ==
Geordie dialect words
