= Joe Wilson (Geordie singer) =

Joe Wilson (29 November 1841 – 14 February 1875) was a Tyneside concert hall songwriter and performer in the mid-19th century. His most famous song is "Keep yor feet still Geordie hinny". He was a contemporary of George "Geordie" Ridley. He wrote and sang in the Geordie dialect of Newcastle upon Tyne, his native speech.

== Biography ==
Joseph "Joe" Wilson was born just before his twin brother, Tom, in Stowell Street, Newcastle upon Tyne. His father was a cabinet-maker, his mother a bonnet-maker. He enjoyed singing from an early age and had a fine treble voice, which led to his becoming a choir boy at All Saints' Church.

At age 14, he went to work as an apprentice printer with Howe Brothers of Gateshead. He started writing songs as a hobby, and by age 17 published his first book, managing to publish and distribute it independently. He later arranged for the printing to be done at Howe Brothers.

Wilson started performing professionally in 1864 and became a regular at the Wheat Sheaf (Note: The hall at the Wheat Sheaf was called Balmbra's, after its owner, John Balmbra, and may have been the best known music hall outside London. In the late 1860s it was renamed The Oxford.) in the Cloth Market. He later moved to the newer, larger Tyne Concert Hall. He then toured the North of England, selling his home-produced song-books like most artists of the day (for a halfpenny each).

He married in 1869, and two years later tried settling down to a less itinerant lifestyle. In 1871 he became publican of the Adelaide Inn (Note: The Adelaide Hotel then became known as Joe Wilson's. It is called the King's Manor at the time of this image.) on New Bridge Street, Newcastle. He was a publican for about a year, then he went back on the road, singing and writing. His act now included many "teetotal" songs, as he had taken the pledge.

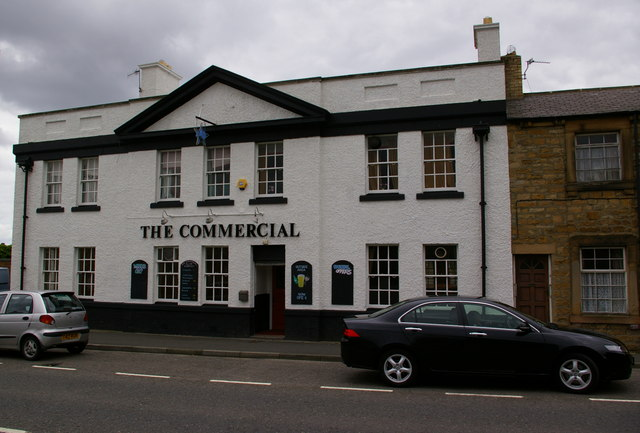
Commercial Hotel, Winlaton

His health failed when he contracted tuberculosis, as his father had. A friend and colleague Rowly Harrison, publican of The Commercial in Winlaton, allowed Wilson to stay with him, as his pub was at a higher elevation, and therefore thought to have cleaner, more bracing air.

Joe Wilson died of tuberculosis in Railway Street, Newcastle, survived by his wife and three young children. He was buried in the Jesmond Old Cemetery where a monument marking his grave was erected sometime afterward. The inscription on the monument is in his own words: "It's been me aim t'hev a place i'th' hearts o' the Tyneside people, wi' writin' bits o'hyemly sangs aw think they'll sing."

== Legacy ==
Joe Wilson was probably the most prolific of all the Geordie songwriters of the time. He performed his own works in the various halls of entertainment around the region until he became too ill. Many of his songs were published in his book Songs and Drolleries, and also in Allan's Tyneside Songs and Readings.

"Sally Wheatley" was revived during the late 20th century, by e.g. Alex Glasgow and The Dubliners.

An album of Joe Wilson's songs, "The Day of Life", with newly composed music, was released by the Geordie singer songwriter Pete Scott as part of the Northumbrian Anthology project in 2001.

== Works ==
Wilson's songs were published during his lifetime, as well as after his death. This is a partial list.

- "Keep yor feet still Geordie hinny" to the tune of "Nelly Gray"/"Maggie May"
- "Come Geordie ha'd the bairn"
- "Aa hope ye'll be kind ti me dowter"
- "The Row upon the Stairs"
- "Dinnet clash the door"
- "The time that me fethur was bad"
- "The Gallowgate Lad"
- "The Lass That Lives Next Door"
- "Narvis Johnny"
- "Sally Wheatley"
- "Through Drinking Bitter Beer"
- "The Bonny Gateshead Lass"

== See also ==
- Geordie dialect words
