= Come Geordie ha'd the bairn =

Song performed by Joe Wilson

"Come Geordie ha’d the bairn"

Song by Joe Wilson
- Language: English (Geordie)
- Written: c. 1856
- Published: c. 1858
- Genre: Folk song
- Songwriter(s): Joe Wilson

"Come Geordie ha'd the bairn" or "Aw wish thy Muther wad cum" is a famous Geordie folk song written in the 19th century by Joe Wilson, in a style deriving from music hall. The song was written in a satirical style which was based on his own brother’s discomfort at nursing their little baby sister.

== Lyrics ==
Joe Wilson was probably the most prolific of all the Geordie songwriters of the time.
Many of his works were published in his book of ‘Songs and Drolleries’ which is a feast of dialect materials.

This version is as follows:-

Come, Geordie—ha'd the Bairn or Aw wish thy Muther wad cum.
Air – “"The Whistling Thief".”

Come, Geordie, ha'd the bairn,
Aw's sure aw'll not stop lang;
Aw'd tyek the jewel me sel,
But really aw's not strang.
Thor's floor an' coals to get,
The hoose-wark's not half deun,
Sae--haud the bairn for fairs,
Thou's often deun't for fun.

Then Geordie held the bairn,
But sair agyen his will;
The poor bit thing wes good,
But Geordie had nee skill;
He haddent its Muther's ways,
He sat byeth stiff an' numb;
Afore five minutes was gyen,
He wish'd its Muther wad cum.

His wife had hardlys gyen,
The bairn began to squall,
With hikin't up an' doon
He varry neigh let it fall.
It nivver wad ha'd its tung,
Tho' some aud teun he'd hum--
"Jack and Jill went up the hill"--
"Aw wish thy Muther wad cum."

What weary toil said he
This nursin' bairns mun be;
A bit on't's well enough,
Aye, quite eneuf for me.
To ha'd-a blubberin' bairn,
It may be grand to some;
A day's wark's not as bad--
"Aw wish thy Muther wad cum.

" Men seldom give a thowt
To what their wives endure;
Aw thowt she'd nowt to dee
But clean the hoose, aw's sure,
Or myek my dinner an' tea--
(It's startin' to sook its thumb;
The Poor thing wants its tit)--
"Aw wish thy Muther wad cum."

What a selfish world this is!
There's nowt mair sae than Man;
He laffs at Wimmin's toill,
An' nivvir 'll norse his awn--
(It's startin' to cry agyen--
Aw see tuts throo it's gum;)
Maw canny bit pet, O dinna thoo fret--
"Aw wish thy Muther wad cum."

But kindness dis a vast-
It's nee use gettin vext--
It'll niver please the bairn,
Or ease a mind perplext.
At last it's gyen to sleep,
The Wife'll not say aw's numb--
She'll think aw's a real good nurse--
But--"Aw wish thy Muther wad cum."

== Recordings ==
- Denis Weatherley (bass–baritone) was born in Ryton in 1912. He took a science degree at Armstrong College, Newcastle and began a career in teaching, as well as delighting audiences with his renditions of North East songs. His E.P. entitled “A collection from the 1950s” (ref MWMCDSP27) included Geordie Haad The Bairn together with 15 other titles.

== See also ==
- Geordie dialect words
