= List of Geordie songbooks =

Many compilations of songs in the Geordie dialect of north-east England have been published, mainly in the 19th century.

== Songbooks ==
Compiled by	Title	Notes
Thomas Allan	Illustrated Edition of Tyneside Songs and Readings	
Thomas Allan	Choice Collection of Tyneside Songs (A) 1863	An earlier edition of Allan's Illustrated Edition of Tyneside Songs and Readings of 1891
Robert Allen	Canny Bit Verse	
James Anderson	Blyth and Tyneside Poems & Songs 1898	
James Anderson	Cumberland Ballads by Robert Anderson 1866	
James Anderson	Poetical works of Robert Anderson, author of Cumberland ballads, etc.; to which is prefixed the life of the author, written by himself	
C. W. Barnes	The Shields Song Book	
John Bell Jr	Rhymes of Northern Bards	
John Bell Jr	Songs from the Manuscript Collection of John Bell 1885	D I Harker editor 1985
William Brockie	The Shields Garland	
Bruce and Stokoe	Northumbrian Minstrelsy	
Charles Ernest Catcheside-Warrington	Tyneside Songs	
Charles Ernest Catcheside-Warrington	Tyneside Stories & Recitations	
Chater	Chater's Annual	A yearbook published between 1861 and 1882
Chater	Canny Newcassel Diary and Remembrancer 1872	
Chater	Keelmin's Comic Annewal	A yearbook published between 1869 and 1883
Joseph Crawhall	Beuk o' Newcassell Sangs 1888	
	Cresswell's Local and other Songs and Recitations 1883	
Davison	The Northumbrian Minstrel, 1811	
Davison	Collection of Tyneside Songs, 1840	
	Dunbar's local songs and recitations 1874	
Fordyce	The Newcastle Song Book, or, Tyne-side Songster: 1842, 332 pages	
Fordyce	Tyne Songster - 1840	
P. France & Co.	Songs of the Bards of the Tyne - 1850	
	James' Sum Tyneside Sangs 1898	
William Coolidge Lane	Catalogue of English and American chapbooks and broadside ballads 1905	
Eneas Mackenzie	Descriptive and Historical account of the town and county of Newcastle upon Tyne	
Maidment	Bibliotheca Curiosa, A North Countrie Garland	Edited by James Maidment 1884 and revised by Edmund Goldsmid F.R.H.S.(1891)
John Marshall	Collection of Songs, Comic, Satirical 1827	
John Marshall	Newcastle Songster	
John Marshall	Garland of New Songs, c1800	
John Marshall	Northern Minstrel, or Tyne Songster: 1806 (approx 141 pages)	
Thomas Marshall	A Collection of original local songs	
Ritson	Northern Garlands 1810	
Ritson	Bishopric Garland or Durham Minstrel 1792	
Ritson	Yorkshire Garland 1809	
Ritson	Northumberland Garland or Newcastle Nightingale 1809	
Ritson	North-Country Chorister 1809	
Ritson	Gammer Gurton's Garland	
Ritson	Ancient Songs 1790	
John Ross	Songs of the Tyne	
Sir Walter Scott	Minstrelsy of the Scottish Border Vol 2, 1807	
Cuthbert Sharp	Bishoprick Garland 1834	
Joseph Skipsey	Carols from the Coal Field	
William Stephenson (junior)	Tyneside Minstrel 1824	
Stokoe	Songs and ballads of northern England	Collected and edited by John Stokoe; harmonised and arranged for pianoforte by Samuel Reay
J. W. Swanston	Tyneside Songster	
William R. Walker	Songs of the Tyne	
	James Weams' Tyneside Song Book 1887	
W G Whittaker	North Countrie Songs	A book of traditional North Country songs like Bobby Shaftoe and Billy Boy becoming very popular in schools, which in turn, brought the songs to the attention of the whole country (late 1920s)

== Songs ==
- "The Amphitrite" — writer Robert Gilchrist
- "Asstrilly's Goold Fields" — writer Edward Corvan
- "Billy Boy"
- "Bob Cranky's Adieu" — writer William Shield
- "Bobby Shafto's Gone to Sea"
- "Broom Buzzems" — writer William Purvis (Blind Willie)
- "Ca' Hawkie through the watter" — writer Unknown
- "The Caller" — writer Edward Corvan
- "The Cliffs of Old Tynemouth" — writer David Ross Lietch
- "The Collier’s Rant" — writer Unknown
- "Come Geordie ha'd the bairn" — writer Joe Wilson
- "Cushie Butterfield" — writer George Ridley
- "Dance To Thy Daddy" — writer William Watson
- "Geordy Black" — song - writer Rowland Harrison
- "Hi, canny man" — writer Harry Nelson
- "Hydrophobie" — writer Robert Emery
- "Jemmy Joneson’s Whurry" — writer Thomas Thompson
- "Keep yor feet still Geordie hinny" — writer Joe Wilson
- "Newcassel Props" — writer William Oliver
- "The Newcassel Worthies" — writer William “Willie” Armstrong
- "The Pitman’s Courtship" — writer William Mitford
- "The Pitman’s Happy Times" — writer Joseph Philip Robson
- "The Pitman’s Revenge" — writer George Cameron
- "The Puddens That Me Mother Used Te Myek" — writer Jack Robson
- "The Skipper's Dream" — writer T Moor
- "When the Boat Comes In" — writer William Watson
- "Wor Geordie's lost his penka" — writer Unknown
- "Wor Nanny’s a mazer" — writer Thomas “Tommy” Armstrong
- "Wor Peg's Trip te Tynemouth" — writer Joe Wilson

== Publishers and printers ==
- Thomas Allan
- George Angus
- Margaret Angus
- Thomas Angus
- John Bell (Junior)
- William Brockie
- John Collingwood Bruce
- James Catnach
- John Catnach
- John W. Chater
- Joseph Crawhall
- William Davison
- Scott Dobson
- W & T Fordyce
- P. France
- Ralph Hawkes
- John Marshall
- Thomas Marshall
- Joseph Ritson
- John Ross
- Cuthbert Sharp
- John Stokoe
- J. W. Swanston
- William R. Walker

=== Radio shows ===
- Wot Cheor Geordie
- Geordierama

== See also ==
- Geordie dialect words
- Allan's Illustrated Edition of Tyneside Songs and Readings
- Fordyce's Tyne Songster
- France's Songs of the Bards of the Tyne - 1850
- The Bishoprick Garland (1834, by Sharp)
- Rhymes of Northern Bards
- Marshall's Collection of Songs, Comic, Satirical 1827
- The Songs of the Tyne by Ross
- The Songs of the Tyne by Walker
- Marshall's A Collection of original local songs
