= List of Geordie characters, events and places =

== Characters ==
| Name | Mentioned in | Story | Notes |
| John Atkinson | "The Barnardcastle Tragedy" (song) | John Atkinson was from Murton near Appleby and was the servant of Thomas Howson, a miller. He courted Howson's sister andm at the same time, courted and wed another, encouraged by a "friend" Thomas Skelton, who actually married them to save the fees. He broke the heart of Howson's sister and she bled to death. | This song is sung to the tune of "Constant Anthony" and appears on page 11 in Joseph Ritson's Bishopric Garland or Durham Minstrel, on page 39 in (Sir) Cuthbert Sharpe's Bishoprick Garland and page 271 in John Bell's Rhymes of Northern Bards |
| Thomas Wentworth Beaumont | "The Colours" (song) | The subject of a song and also a Member of Parliament. | Possibly written by Robert Surtees. Appeared on page 279 of Thomas Allan's Illustrated Edition of Tyneside Songs and Readings, together with a brief bio of the events. |
| Captain John Bolton | "A True and tragical song concerning Captain John Bolton" (song/poem) | John Bolton was an Irishman from Bulmer, near Castle Howard, and Lieutenant in the 1st regiment of the West Riding militia. He took Elizabeth Rainbow, a single woman from the Foundling hospital at Ackworth, as an apprentice. She became pregnant with his child and he strangled her with his hands, a cord and soldier's fife. Captain Bolton hanged himself in York Castle before the death sentence could be carried out. | The song appears on page 24 of Joseph Ritson's Yorkshire Garland and sung to the tune of "Fair lady, lay your costly robes aside". |
| Charles John Brandlin | "The Newcastle Noodles" written by James Morrison (song) | The subject of a song and also a Member of Parliament. | The song appears on page 200 of Thomas Allan's Illustrated Edition of Tyneside Songs and Readings, page 141 of France's Songs of the Bards of the Tyne, page 169 of Fordyce's The Tyne Songster, page 166 of John Marshall's Collection of Songs, Comic, Satirical and page 9 of Marshall's Newcastle Songster. There is also a short bio in Allan's book. |
| Rowland Burdon | "Sunderland Bridge" by "M W of North Shields" | The subject of a song/poem and also a Member of Parliament. | |
| Thomas Burdon | Unknown song/poem | Lieut. Col. of the Tyne Hussars and knighted by the Prince Regent in May 1816, Mayor of Newcastle 1810 and again in 1816. | This was noted on page 618 of Eneas Mackenzie's history of Newcastle and Gateshead. A short bio also appears on page 199 of Thomas Allan's Illustrated Edition of Tyneside Songs and Readings |
| Thomas Burt | Two works by Robert Elliott (song/poem) | The subject of a song/poem and also a Member of Parliament for Morpeth 1874-1918. | |
| Thomas Carr | "The Owl" by Robert Emery (song) | T. Waller Watson brought a successful action at Newcastle Assizes, August 1823, against Thomas Carr, Captain of the Watch, for assault and false imprisonment. Carr was fined, but after failing to pay was himself imprisoned. The local poets loved it and wrote several songs about it. A short bio appears of the aftermath on page 310 of Allan's book - page 153 Thomas Allan's Illustrated Edition of Tyneside Songs and Readings. | Page 306 in Thomas Allan's Illustrated Edition of Tyneside Songs and Readings, on page 342 in France's Songs of the Bards of the Tyne, on page 142 in John Marshall's Collection of Songs, Comic, Satirical and page 153 in Fordyce's The Tyne Songster |
| Thomas Carr | "Tom Carr and Waller Watson - or Tom and Jerry at Home" by W Oliver (song) | T. Waller Watson brought a successful action at Newcastle Assizes, August 1823, against Thomas Carr, Captain of the Watch, for assault and false imprisonment. Carr was fined, but after failing to pay was himself imprisoned. The local poets loved it and wrote several songs about it. A short bio appears of the aftermath on page 310 of Allan's book - page 153 Thomas Allan's Illustrated Edition of Tyneside Songs and Readings. | Page 451 in France's book, on page 137 in Marshall's book and on page 148 in Fordyce's book. |
| Thomas Carr | "Johny Sc-tt & Tommy C-rr" - writer unknown | T. Waller Watson brought a successful action at Newcastle Assizes, August 1823, against Thomas Carr, Captain of the Watch, for assault and false imprisonment. Carr was fined, but after failing to pay was himself imprisoned. The local poets loved it and wrote several songs about it. A short bio appears of the aftermath on page 310 of Allan's book - page 153 Thomas Allan's Illustrated Edition of Tyneside Songs and Readings. | On page 139 in Marshall's book and on page 150 in Fordyce's book |
| Thomas Carr | "Tommy C**r in Limbo" | T. Waller Watson brought a successful action at Newcastle Assizes, August 1823, against Thomas Carr, Captain of the Watch, for assault and false imprisonment. Carr was fined, but after failing to pay was himself imprisoned. The local poets loved it and wrote several songs about it. A short bio appears of the aftermath on page 310 of Allan's book - page 153 Thomas Allan's Illustrated Edition of Tyneside Songs and Readings. | Page 19 in John Marshall's Newcastle Songster, on page 140 in Marshall's Collection of Songs, Comic, Satirical's and on page 151 in Fordyce's book. |
| Robert Chamber | "Robert Chambers" (song) | The subject of a song and also an oarsman. | Appears on page 527 of Thomas Allan's Illustrated Edition of Tyneside Songs and Readings, together with a lengthy bio. |
| Henry "Harry" Clasper | | The subject of a song and also an oarsman. | A detailed bio appears on page 506 of Thomas Allan's Illustrated Edition of Tyneside Songs and Readings. |
| John Delaval, 1st Baron Delaval | "Lines on the Death of John, Lord Delaval" written by M Harvey (song) | The subject of a song and also a Member of Parliament. | The song appears on page 100 of John Bell's Rhymes of Northern Bards. |
| John Elliott | "The Wizard of the North - or The Mystic Policeman" written by Robert Emery (song) | The subject of a song and Superintendent of Gateshead Police c. 1890. | The song appears on page 308 of Thomas Allan's Illustrated Edition of Tyneside Songs and Readings, together with a brief bio. |
| Jane Frizzle | "Ode to the River Derwent" written by John Carr (poem) | The subject of a poem and a suspected witch. | Appears on pages 43 to 48 of (Sir) Cuthbert Sharpe's Bishoprick Garland, which includes a short bio. |
| Charles Green | "Green's Balloon" (song) | The subject of a song/songs, Charles Green and others flights in a balloon at Newcastle, were at the time, still quite a feat, as witnessed by the massive crowds that gathered. | The song appears on page 202 of Thomas Allan's Illustrated Edition of Tyneside Songs and Readings which also includes brief details, on page 331 in France's Songs of the Bards of the Tyne, page 78 in John Marshall's Collection of Songs, Comic, Satirical and page 97 in Fordyce's The Tyne Songster. |
| King George IV of the United Kingdom | | The subject of several songs | |
| Graeme Clan | "Hughie the Graeme" (song) | About the Graeme Clan and leader, who seemed to inhabit the debatable Lands, i.e. close to the English/Scottish border. | A very brief history is to be found pages 35 to 36 of Bruce and Stokoe's Northumbrian Minstrelsy. |
| Robert Gillespy | "The Willow Tree" by Marshall Cresswell (song/poem) | The subject of a song/poem and a farmer. From Low Weetslade, near Dudley, Wideopen, Newcastle, Gillespy was on his way to school in Crow Hall in 1818 and noticed two workmen cutting down hedges He picked a twig with the idea of using it as a make-believe riding whip. He took it home with him and stuck it in the ground. At the time of his death in 1878 it had grown into a huge willow tree. | |
| Peter and his bride Jenny Gowen | "Pelton Garland" (song/poem) | The brickmaker Peter borrows a horse and absconds (or elopes) with his girlfriend Jenny Gowen. The couple return after four days with the (worse for wear) horse, discover the girl is with child and eventually persuade grandmother to agree to a marriage. | The song is sung to the tune of "Maggy Lauder (or Lawther)" and appears on page 71 of Joseph Ritson's Northumberland Garland and page 190 of John Bell's Rhymes of Northern Bards. |
| John Higgins | "Johnny Luik-up" written and sung by George Ridley (song) | | |
| Stephen Kemble | "The Barber's News - or Shields in an Uproar" by John Shield (song) | Kemble was, for a time, the very successful and much liked manager of the Theatre Royal, Newcastle. He was an extremely large individual of enormous bulk, of whom it was rather unkindly said, was the only person able to play the part of Falstaff without the use of any padding. | A brief detail appears on page 76 of Thomas Allan's Illustrated Edition of Tyneside Songs and Readings. |
| James Lennon | "The Collier's doom" by Marshall Cresswell (song) | The song was written in memory of 33-year-old James Lennon, who was killed in an accident at Dudley Pit on 31 December 1879. It shows the esteem in which the local people of his village held him. | A brief detail appears on page 95 of Cresswell's Local and other Songs and Recitations. |
| George Maddison | "Ode to the River Derwent" written by John Carr (poem) | The subject of a poem and also a British politician | The work appears on pages 43 to 48 of (Sir) Cuthbert Sharpe's Bishoprick Garland, which includes a short bio. |
| Elsie Marley | "Elsie Marley" (song/poem) | An Alewife at Pictree, near Chester-le-Street. Born Alice Harrison. | A few details are given on page 48 of (Sir) Cuthbert Sharpe's Bishoprick Garland and page 113 of Bruce and Stokoe's Northumbrian Minstrelsy. |
| Robert de Nevill | "Lamentation on the death of Sir Robert de Nevill, Lord of Raby, in 1282" (song/poem) | Robert de Nevill (or de Neville), Second Baron of Raby (ca. 1220 – 1282), was the son of Geoffrey Fitz-Robert and his wife Margaret. | The song appears on page 64 of Joseph Ritson's Bishopric Garland or Durham Minstrel. |
| Thomas Percy, 7th Earl of Northumberland | "Rookhope Ryde" (song/poem) | Thomas Percy was one of the leaders of the Rising of the North of 1569. Charles Neville, 6th Earl of Westmorland was another of the leaders. Northumberland was captured and publicly beheaded in York for treason in 1572. Westmorland fled to Flanders and on the Spain, where he died in poverty in 1601. He was attainted (condemned for treason, entailing losing his property and hereditary titles and rights) by Parliament in 1571. | The song appears on page 54 of Joseph Ritson's Bishopric Garland, page 14 in (Sir) Cuthbert Sharpe's Bishoprick Garland and page 276 of John Bell's Rhymes of Northern Bards, in each case with a varying degree of bio. |
| James Radclyffe, 3rd Earl of Derwentwater | "A song on the Lord of Derwentwater" (song/poem) | The subject of a song/poem and an Earl, executed for treason as a Jacobite. | Both appear on page 225 of John Bell's Rhymes of Northern Bards. |
| "Verses ……. The unfortunate James, earl of Derwentwater" (song/poem) | | The subject of a song/poem and an Earl, executed for treason as a Jacobite. | Both appear on page 225 of John Bell's Rhymes of Northern Bards. |
| Sir Matthew White Ridley of Heaton | "Canny Newcassel" written by Thomas Thompson (song/poem) | The subject of a song/poem and also a long-serving and popular Member of Parliament. | This song/poem appears in many of the chapbooks including on page 47 of Thomas Allan's Illustrated Edition of Tyneside Songs and Readings which also includes a very brief biography. |
| Russell the pedestrian | "On Russell The Pedestrian" (song/poem) | The subject of a song/poem and an athlete (a road walker). | The song appears on page 180 of Fordyce's The Tyne Songster and also on page 181 of John Marshall's Collection of Songs, Comic, Satirical together with a short bio. |
| William Hetherington Shipley | "Shipley's Drop frae the Cloods" (song) | The subject of a song/poem and a parachutist. | The author used the pseudonym "Georgie" when it was published in the Shields Gazette. The song also appears on page 575 in Thomas Allan's Illustrated Edition of Tyneside Songs and Readings with a brief bio. |
| Captain John Sim | "Sim of Dundee" by John Shield (song/poem) | The subject of a song/poem, Captain Sim of Dundee, of the ship Antaeus, took the bar at Tynemouth during a violent storm. | For this intrepid achievement he was awarded a silver cup on 1 September 1833 and the song was sung at this event. The song is sung to the tune of "Newcastle Races" and appears on page 415 of France's Songs of the Bards of the Tyne together with the brief note of the event. |
| John Simpson the pedestrian | "On Simpson The Pedestrian's Failure" (song/poem) | The subject of a song/poem and an athlete (a road walker). | The song appears on page 181 of Fordyce's The Tyne Songster and also on page 182 of John Marshall's Collection of Songs, Comic, Satirical together with a short bio on page 180. |
| Spottee | "Spottee" possibly written by Thomas Clerke (song/poem) | The subject of a song/poem and an eccentric French Sailor from Roker, Sunderland. | The song appears on page 50 of (Sir) Cuthbert Sharpe's Bishoprick Garland with a brief bio on the following page. |
| Herbert Stockhore | "A new song called Hark to Winchester on The Yorkshire Volunteer's farewell to the good folks of Stockton" (song/poem) | Herbert Stockhore was a private in the Yorkshire Volunteer regiment. | Stockhore was the "pretend" author of the song. It is sung to the tune of "Push about the Jorum" and appears on page 35 of Joseph Ritson's Bishopric Garland. |
| George Stoole | "A Lamentable Ditty on the death of worth George Stoole" (song) | Stoole was noted as being a "worthy gentleman" living between Gate-side Moor and Newcastle, yet he was accused of, arrested for, and condemned to death in Newcastle for the theft of cattle. At that period, the theft of animals was considered to be very serious. The theft of horses had always been considered to be extremely serious, and been punishable by death. More recent laws of the 1740s put the theft of sheep and cattle into a similar category. | The song is sung to "a delicate Scottish Tune" and appears on page 43 of Joseph Ritson's Northumberland Garland. |
| Joseph Swan | "The Illektric Leet" by Alexander Hay (song/poem) | Swan was a British physicist and chemist most famous for the invention of the incandescent light bulb. | The song is sung to "Billy O'Booke's the Boy" and appears on page 562 of Thomas Allan's Illustrated Edition of Tyneside Songs and Readings together with a short bio. |
| Peter Watson | "To Mr Peter Watson - Who lays powerful bats on the knaves with fire-shovel hats on" by Henry Robson (song) | A common shoemaker who opposed the claims of the Government Clergy for the Easter Dues or "Clerical Tax". | The song appears on page 133 of Fordyce's The Tyne Songster complete with details of the event, and also on page 122 of John Marshall's Collection of Songs, Comic, Satirical with the same details. |
| Mr T Waller Watson | | T. Waller Watson brought a successful action at Newcastle Assizes, August 1823, against Thomas Carr, Captain of the Watch, for assault and false imprisonment. | See Thomas Carr (above). |
| Charles Neville, 6th Earl of Westmorland | | | See Thomas Percy, 7th Earl of Northumberland (above). |
| Ernest Wilberforce | "Newcastle Toon nee Mair" by Richard Oliver Heslop (song/poem) | Wilberforce was the first Anglican Bishop of Newcastle after the diocese creation in 1882 (until 1896 when he moved to become Bishop of Chichester). | The song is sung to the tune of "Nae luck aboot the hoose" and appears on page 532 of Thomas Allan's Illustrated Edition of Tyneside Songs and Readings. |
| George Wilson, the Blackheath pedestrian | "On Russell The Pedestrian" (song/poem) | The subject of a song/poem and an athlete (a road walker). | See Russell the pedestrian (above). |
| Mr Wombwell | "The Bonassus" by William Oliver (song/poem) | Mr Wombwell and his animal show visited Newcastle ca. 1821 and tried to pass off a buffalo as a new breed, a "Bonassus". | A short bio appears on page 236 of Thomas Allan's Illustrated Edition of Tyneside Songs and Readings. |
| Roger Wrightson and Martha Railton | "The patern of true love or Bowes Tragedy" (song) | Roger Wrightson (Junior), son of the landlord of the Kings Head Hotel, Bowes, courted Martha Railton, daughter of the widowed landlady of the George Hotel, also in Bowes. In February or March 1714 or 1715 Roger was taken ill and "dyed" of fever a couple of weeks later. Martha was heartbroken and took to her bed only to die shortly after. They were buried in one "Grave on 15 March 1714, both aged 20 years". Just before Martha died, her friend Tom Petty tried to comfort her. | This is sung to the tune of "Queen Dido" and appears on page 18 of Joseph Ritson's Yorkshire Garland with a lengthy bio preceding it on page 15. |

=== The Worthies (or Eccentrics) ===
- Aud (or Awd) Judy (the surname, often not used was Downey, or sometimes Downing) one of the Eccentrics
- Barbara Bell
- Barrel-bagg'd Joe
- Bet (Bouncing Bet)
- Bet (young Beagle Bet)
- Big Bob
- Billy Hush
- Bold Archy (or Airchy) Henderson
- Bugle-Nosed Jack
- Captain Benjamin Starky
- Chancellor Kell (Chuckle-head Chancellor Kell)
- Billy Conolly - an alias of and see William Cleghorn
- Jacky Coxon (sometimes Cockson)
- Robert Cruddace (also went under the alias of Whin Bob)
- Cuckoo Jack - the alias of and see John Wilson
- Cuddy Billy (or Willy) - alias of and see William Maclachlan
- Cull Billy as Silly Billy – alias of and see William Scott
- Dolly Raw (bauld Dolly Raw)
- Donald
- Doodem Daddum (with his Dog, Timour, added in the painting)
- Eccentrics
- Tommy (on the Bridge) was actually Tommy Fearns
- Bella Grey (Young Bella Grey)
- Hangy (or Hangie)
- Hell’s Kitchen (painting) - A famous painting of many of the "Eccentrics" by artist Henry Perlee Parker,
- Jenny Ballo
- Jim Bo
- Airchy Loggan
- William Maclachlan (also known as Cuddy Billy or Willy)
- Mally Ogle
- Peggy Grundy
- Pussy Willy
- Rag Sall
- Ralphy the Hawk
- Bella Roy
- Euphy Scott (or sometimes Heuffy Scott)
- William Scott - known as Cull Billy or Silly Billy
- Anty Shoe-tie
- John Spencer
- John Stephenson
- Jacky Tate
- Whin Bob - an alias of and see Robert Cruddace
- John Wilson -better known as Cuckoo Jack

== Places ==
- Balmbras’ Music Hall
- Billy Fairplay rules
- Black Middens
- Dry-Rig, Smale-Burns or Hanging-Well (South East of Kielder Reservoir)
- Earsdon Sword Dance
- Eastgate
- Frenchman’s Bay
- Greenhead - see Thirwall or Thirlitwall
- Hadston Skeers
- Rookhope
- Sharpness Point
- Spottee’s Cave
- Thirwall or Thirlitwall, near Greenhead and Bewcastle-dale

== See also ==
- Geordie dialect words
- Allan's Illustrated Edition of Tyneside Songs and Readings
- Fordyce's Tyne Songster
- France's Songs of the Bards of the Tyne - 1850
- The Bishoprick Garland (1834, by Sharp)
- Rhymes of Northern Bards
- Marshall's Collection of Songs, Comic, Satirical 1827
- The Songs of the Tyne by Ross
- The Songs of the Tyne by Walker
- Marshall's A Collection of original local songs
