= English folk music (1500–1899) =

== Births and deaths ==
- William Kimber (1872–1961), English morris musician
- Ralph Vaughan Williams (1872–1958), English composer and song collector
- Sam Larner (1878–1965), English folk singer
- Percy Grainger (1882–1961), Australian composer who collected and recorded English folk songs
- Harry Cox (1885–1971), English folk singer
- Lewis 'Scan' Tester (1886–1972), English folk musician

== Collections of songs or music ==
- 1651: English Dancing Master (1st of at least 17 editions), published by John Playford (1623–1686)
- 1725: A Collection of Old Ballads, Ambrose Philips (1674–1749) (ed.)
- 1765: Reliques of Ancient English Poetry Thomas Percy (1721–1811) (ed.)
- 1765: Mother Goose's Melody published by Thomas Carnan (1737–1788)
- 1788: Yorkshire Garland, republished in 1809 by Joseph Ritson (1752–1803)
- 1793: Northumberland Garland, republished in 1809 by Joseph Ritson (1752–1803)
- 1798: Joshua Jackson's Book (manuscript), by Joshua Jackson (1763–1869)
- 1827: Minstrelsy Ancient and Modern, published by William Motherwell (1797–1835)
- 1842: Nursery Rhymes of England, collected and edited by James Orchard Halliwell (1820–1889)
- 1849: Popular Rhymes and Nursery Tales, collected and edited by James Orchard Halliwell (1820–1889)
- 1859: Popular Music of Olden Time, William Chappell (1809–1888) (ed.)
- 1882: Northumbrian Minstrelsy – A Collection of the Ballads, Melodies and Small-Pipe Tunes of Northumbria, J. Collingwood Bruce (1805–1892) and John Stokoe (eds.)
- 1882: English and Scottish Popular Ballads, Francis James Child (1825–1896) (ed.)
- 1893: English County Songs, collected and edited by J. A. Fuller Maitland (1856–1936) and Lucy Broadwood (1858–1929)
- 1893: Songs and Ballads of Northern England, collected and edited by John Stokoe
