= Ritson's Northumberland Garland or Newcastle Nightingale 1809 =

Book by Joseph Ritson

Ritson's Northumberland Garland or Newcastle Nightingale 1793
- Author: Joseph Ritson
- Language: English (Geordie dialect)
- Genre: chapbook
- Publisher: Joseph Ritson
- Publication date: 1809
- Publication place: United Kingdom
- Media type: Print
- Pages: 96 pages and 16 works

Ritson's Northumberland Garland or Newcastle Nightingale, Edited and published by Joseph Ritson, is a revised edition of a book on Northumberland music, published in 1809.

== Details ==
Ritson's Northumberland Garland or Newcastle Nightingale 1809 (or to give its full title – "The Northumberland Garland; or Newcastle Nightingale: A matchless collection of famous songs [As originally edited by the late Joseph Ritson, Esq.] ----Old Tyne shall listen to my tale, and echo, down the bordering vale, The liquid melody prolong. Akenside ---- Newcastle ---- MDCCXCIII Printed by and for Hall and Elliot. Licensed and entered according to Order ---- London: Reprinted for Robert Triphook, 37, St. Jame's Street, by Harding and Wright, St John's Square ---- 1809”) is a book of Geordie folk song consisting of approximately 96 pages with 16 works, first published in 1793 and reprinted (this version) in 1809.

Other books in Ritson's Garland series were Bishopric Garland, The Yorkshire Garland, and The North-Country Chorister. A compilation of the whole series, entitled The Northern Garland was published in 1810.

The “Garland” series were important, not only as important document in their own right, but as one of the main sources of similar successor publications such as John Bell's Rhymes of Northern Bards and Bruce and Stokoe's Northumbrian Minstrelsy.

A set of original documents are held in The Robinson Library of Newcastle University

== The publication ==
The front cover of the book was as thus :-

THE
NORTHUMBERLAND GARLAND;
OR
NEWCASTLE NIGHTINGALE:
A
MATCHLESS COLLECTION
OF
FAMOUS SONGS
[AS ORIGINALLY EDITED
BY THE LATE JOSEPH RITSON, ESQ.]
– - – - – - -
OLD TYNE SHALL LISTEN TO MY TALE,
AND ECHO, DOWN THE BORDERING VALE,
THE LIQUID MELODY PROLONG. AKENSIDE
– - – - – - -
NEWCASTLE
PRINTED BY AND FOR HALLL AND ELLIOT.
MDCCXCIII
Licensed and entered according to Order
– - – - – - -
LONDON:
REPRINTED FOR ROBERT TRIPHOOK, 37, ST. JAME'S STREET.
By Harding and Wright, St. John's-square.
– - – - – - -
1809

== Contents ==
are as below :-

	title	songwriter	tune	comments	notes	ref
cover	The Northumberland Garland or Newcastle Nightingale – headed page					
	Index					
1	Battle of Otterburn – (The)	from an old MSS		battle fought 9 Aug 1388	Song I	
7	Fytte – (A)					
15	Hunting of the Cheviot – (The)			above 300 years old – spelt "Cheviot" in Bell's Rhymes of Northern Bards	Song II	
19	Fit – The Second					
27	Hunting in Chevy-Chase – (The)				Song III	
38	Fair Mabel of Wallington				Song II (incorrect song number)	
43	Lamentable Ditty on the death of worth George Stoole – (A)		A delicate Scottish Tune		Song V	
43	comment on	George Stoole				
48	Ecky's Mare (An excellent ballad of the sickness, death and burial of)	Bernard Rumney of Rothbury			Song VI	
48	comment on	Bernard Rumney of Rothbury				
55	Mitford Galloway's Ramble – (The)	Thomas Whittel or more usual, Whittle	Ranting roaring Willie	actually spelt "Midford"	Song VII	
63	Insipids – (The) or The Mistress with her multitude of Man Servants	Thomas Whittel or more usual, Whittle			Song VIII	
68	Sawney Ogilby's Duel with his Wife	Thomas Whittel or more usual, Whittle	The Worst's past		Song IX	
71	Felton Garland – (The)		Maggy Lawther – Bell's give this as "Maggy Lauder"		Song X	
71	comment on	The brickmaker Pet*r and his bride Jen*y Gow*n				
74	part II riding off in debt					
78	Laidley Worm (The) (of Spindleston Heugh)	Duncan Frasier ca1270		(this version by Robert Lamb, Vicar of Norham)	Song XI	
85	On the First Rebellion – 1715				Song XII	
88	Collier's Rant (The)				Song XIII	
90	(Weel May) The Keel Row	Traditional – before 1760			Song XIV	
91	Bonny Keel Laddie – (The)		The Bonny Pit Laddie	Tune-BS	Song XV	
92	Newcastle Beer	John Cunningham			Song XVI	
95	FINIS					

== Notes ==
Tune-BS -The tune is not given in the book – but it has been added as attributed in Northumbrian Minstrelsy by Bruce and Stokoe, 1882

== See also ==
- Geordie dialect words
- Joseph Ritson
- Ritson's Northern Garlands 1810
- Ritson's Bishopric Garland or Durham Minstrel 1792
- Ritson's Yorkshire Garland 1809
- Ritson's North-Country Chorister 1809
