= Ritson's North-Country Chorister 1809 =

Book by Joseph Ritson

- Author: Joseph Ritson
- Language: English
- Genre: chapbook
- Publisher: Joseph Ritson
- Publication date: 1809
- Publication place: United Kingdom
- Media type: Print
- Pages: 20 pages and 6 works

Ritson's North-Country Chorister , Edited and published by Joseph Ritson, is a revised edition of a book on Durham music, published in 1809.

== Details ==
Ritson's North-Country Chorister (or to give it its full title - “The North-Country Chorister; An unparalleled variety of excellent songs. Collected and published together, for general Amusement, by a Bishoprick Ballad-Singer [Edited by the Late Joseph Ritson, Esq.] ---- To drink good ale to clear my throat, To hear the bagpipes sprightly note, This is the life that pleaseth me. To ramble round the North Country, ---- Durham: printed by L. Pennington, Bookseller. MDCCCII Licensed and entered according to Order ---- London: reprinted for Robert Triphook, 37, St. Jame's Street. By Harding and Wright, St. John's-square ---- 1809”) is a book of North Eastern folk songs consisting of 20 pages with 6 works, first published in 1802 and reprinted (this edition) in 1809.

Other books in Ritson's Garland series were Ritson's Bishopric Garland, The Yorkshire Garland and The Northumberland Garland. A compilation of the whole series, entitled The Northern Garland was published in 1810.

The “Garland” series were important, not only as important document in their own right, but as one of the main sources of similar successor publications such as John Bell's Rhymes of Northern Bards and Bruce and Stokoe's Northumbrian Minstrelsy.

A set of original documents are held in The Robinson Library of Newcastle University

== The publication ==
The front cover of the book was as thus :-

THE
North-Country
CHORISTER;
AN
UNPARALLELED VARIETY
OF
EXCELLENT SONGS.
Collected and published together, for
general Amusement,
BY
A BISHOPRICK BALLAD-SINGER
[EDITED BY THE LATE
JOSEPH RITSON, ESQ.]
- - - - - - -
To drink good ale to clear my throat,
To hear the bagpipes sprightly note,
To ramble round the North Country,
This is the life that pleaseth me.
- - - - - - -
DURHAM:
PRINTED BY L. PENNINGTON, BOOKSELLER
. MDCCCII
Licensed and entered according to Order
- - - - - - -
LONDON:
REPRINTED FOR ROBERT TRIPHOOK, 37, ST. JAME'S STREET.
By Harding and Wright, St. John's-square.
- - - - - - -
1809

== Contents ==
are as below :-

	title	songwriter	tune	comments	notes	ref
cover	The North-Country Chorister					
	contents					
3	Tommy Linn				Song I	
5	Randle a Barnaby				Song II	
9	Joyful Maid and sorrowful Wife - (The)				Song III	
12	New Highland Lad - (The)				Song IV	
14	Laddy Lye near me				Song V	
15	Bonny Scot made a gentleman - (The)				Song VI	
19	FINIS					

== See also ==
Geordie dialect words
Joseph Ritson
Ritson's Northern Garlands 1810
Ritson's Bishopric Garland or Durham Minstrel 1792
Ritson's Yorkshire Garland 1809
Ritson's Northumberland Garland or Newcastle Nightingale 1809
