= Ritson's Bishopric Garland or Durham Minstrel 1792 =

Book by Joseph Ritson

- Author: Joseph Ritson
- Language: English
- Genre: chapbook
- Publisher: Joseph Ritson
- Publication date: 1792
- Publication place: United Kingdom
- Media type: Print
- Pages: approx 70 pages and 20 works

Bishopric Garland or Durham Minstrel, Edited and published by Joseph Ritson, is a revised and corrected edition of a book on County Durham music, published in 1792.

== Details ==
Bishopric Garland or Durham Minstrel 1792 (or to give it its full title – "The Bishopric Garland or Durham Minstrel being a choice collection of excellent songs relating to the above county – Full of agreeable Variety, and pleasant Mirth. [Edited by the late Joseph Ritson, Esq.] ---Stockton. Printed by R. Christopher . MDCCLXXXIV ---Licensed and entered according to Order. --- A New Edition, corrected. Newcastle: Printed by Hall and Elliot. MDCCXCII") is a book of Geordie folk song consisting of approximately 70 pages with 20 works, published in 1792.

The original edition was published in 1784, this edition appeared in 1792 in a slightly corrected and expanded form, and a further reprint was published in 1809.

Other books in Ritson's Garland series were The Yorkshire Garland, The Northumberland Garland, and The North-Country Chorister. A compilation of the whole series, entitled The Northern Garland was published in 1810.

The "Garland" series were important, not only as important document in their own right, but as one of the main sources of similar successor publications such as John Bell's Rhymes of Northern Bards and Bruce and Stokoe's Northumbrian Minstrelsy.

A set of original documents are held in The Robinson Library of Newcastle University

== The publication ==
The front cover of the book was as thus :-

THE
BISHOPRIC GARLANDS
OR
DURHAM MINSTREL
BEING A
CHOICE COLLECTION
OF
EXCELLENT SONGS
RELATING TO THE ABOVE COUNTY
Full of agreeable Variety, and pleasant Mirth.
[EDITED BY THE LATE
JOSEPH RITSON, ESQ.]
– - – - – - -
STOCKTON
PRINTED BY R. CHRISTOPHER.
MDCCLXXXIV
Licensed and entered according to Order
– - – - – - -
A NEW EDITION, CORRECTED.
NEWCASTLE:
PRINTED BY HALL AND ELLIOT.
MDCCXCII

== Contents ==
are as below :-

	title	songwriter	tune	comments	notes	ref
cover	Bishoprick Garland or Durham Minstrel					
	Contents					
1	Durham Garland – (The), in four parts				Song I	
11	Barnardcastle Tragedy – (The)		Constant Anthony		Song II	
11	The true story of the wheedling servant	John Atkinson				
15	Stockton's Commendation (number one) – an old song		Sir John Fenwick's the flower amang them		Song III	
18	New Song, in praise of Stockton, for 1764 – (A)	William Sutton			Song IV	
20	Stockton's Commendation (number two) or New way of Stockton's Commendation – (The)	Benjamin Pye L.L.D. Archdeacon of Durham	to the old tune	see Archdeacon of Durham	Song V	
23	Stockton's Commendation, A New song				Song VI	
26	Hare-skin – (The)	Geo. Knight, Shoemaker	Have you heard of a frolicsome ditty		Song VII	
30	Limbo	Geo. Knight, Shoemaker	On a time I was great, now little I'm grown		Song VIII	
33	Launching of the Strickland – (The)	Geo. Knight, Shoemaker	Robin Hood and the Tanner		Song IX	
35	Hark to Winchester A new song called) or The Yorkshire Volunteer's farewell to the good folks of Stockton		Push about the Jorum		Song X	
35	note of Herbert Stockhore	Herbert Stockhore, the pretend author				
39	Sedgefield Frolic – (The)				Song XI	
43	Pleasures of Sunderland – (The)				Song XII	
45	Frolicsome olds Women of Sunderland – (The), or the disappointed young maidens		They'll marry, tho' threescore and ten		Song XIII	
47	New Song made on Alice Marley – (A)			an alewife at ******, near Chester	Song IV (numbered incorrectly)	
47	She had been called Elsie in the original edition	Alice Marley		(meaning Picktree, Chester-le-Street)		
49	New Song in praise of the Durham Militia – (A)		The Lillies of France		Song XV	
52	Lass of Cockerton – (The)		Low down in the Broom		Song XVI	
54	Rookhope Ryde			A Durham border song, composed 1569 – this song not in the 1st edition	Song XVII	
54	comment on	Rookhope Burn				
54	Northumberland betrayed by Douglas	a ballad				
55	comment on	Thirwall or Thirlitwall, near Bewcastle-dale				
56	Dinner time usually 11:00 in those days	short comment				
57	comment on	The two earls of Northumberland and Westmoreland				
58	this continued	The two earls and the battle of 1570				
58	some dialect	short comment				
58	date of St Nicholas' day	short comment				
59	comment on	Eastgate				
59	comment on	Dry-Rig, Smale-Burns or Hanging-Well				
59	the warrior's clothing	short comment				
61	a missing line	short comment				
64	Lamentation on the death of Sir Robert de Nevill, Lord of Raby, in 1282			this song not in the 1st edition	Song XVIII	
64	comment on	Robert de Nevill				
64	FINIS					

== See also ==
Geordie dialect words
Joseph Ritson
Ritson's Northern Garlands 1810
Ritson's Yorkshire Garland 1809
Ritson's Northumberland Garland or Newcastle Nightingale 1809
Ritson's North-Country Chorister 1809
