= Ritson's Northern Garlands 1810 =

Book by Joseph Ritson

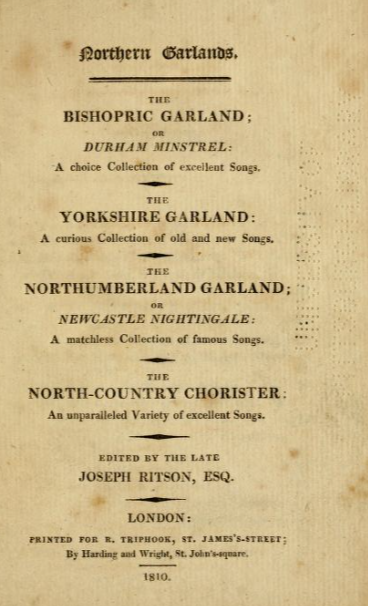
- Title page for Northern Garlands (1810)
- Author: Joseph Ritson
- Language: English
- Genre: chapbook
- Publisher: Joseph Ritson
- Publication date: 1810
- Publication place: United Kingdom
- Media type: Print
- Pages: approx 100 pages

Ritson's Northern Garlands is a compilation of four previously published books on North East music. It was edited and published by Joseph Ritson in 1810.

== Details ==
Ritson's Northern Garlands 1810 (or to give it its full title - “Northern Garlands -- The Bishopric Garland or Durham Minstrel; A choice collection of excellent songs -- The Yorkshire Garland; A curious collection of old and new songs -- The Northumberland Garland or Newcastle Nightingale; A matchless collection of famous songs -- The North-Country Chorister; An unparalleled variety of excellent songs -- Edited by the late Joseph Ritson, Esq -- London; Printed for R. Triphook, St. Jame's Street; By Harding and Wright, St. John' Square – 1810”) is a book of North East of England folk songs consisting of approximately 100 pages, published in 1810.

Joseph Ritson’s Northern Garland is a compilation of the 4 volumes of songs published in the late 18th and early 19th century. The four separate volumes are as follows :-

1. The Bishopric Garland or Durham Minstrell (note the mis-spelling in the forward to the collection) which first appeared in 1784, and again in 1792 in a slightly corrected and expanded form, with a reprint in 1809
2. The Yorkshire Garland which first appeared as part I in 1788 (however part II never appeared). A further edition was reprinted in 1809.
3. The Northumberland Garland or Newcastle Nightingale first appeared in 1793, reprinted in 1809 - and
4. The North-Country Chorister first appeared 1802, reprinted in 1809.
5. The compilation with the collective title of “The Northern Garland” was published in 1810.

It is only an important document in its own right, but one of the main sources of similar successor publications such as John Bell's Rhymes of Northern Bards and Bruce and Stokoe's Northumbrian Minstrelsy.

A set of original documents are held in The Robinson Library of Newcastle University

== Contents ==
The compilation book is set out as follows:-

front cover
Several blank pages
An article headed “Advertisement” which is a preface detailing the books and their editor
This is followed by the four separate sections, each with their own songs, poems, comments, etc.,

- Part I The Bishoprick Garland or Durham Minstrel,
- Part II The Yorkshire Garland,
- Part III The Northumberland Garland, and
- Part IV The North-Country Chorister,

each section with its own index/contents page except Part III.

== See also ==
- Geordie dialect words
- Joseph Ritson
- Ritson's Bishopric Garland or Durham Minstrel 1792
- Ritson's Yorkshire Garland 1809
- Ritson's Northumberland Garland or Newcastle Nightingale 1809
- Ritson's North-Country Chorister 1809
