= Rumney =

Rumney may refer to:

== People ==
- Bernard Rumney (c. 1600–1690), English bard and musician
- Edgar Rumney (1936–2015), English professional footballer
- Harold Rumney (1907–1987), Australian rules footballer
- Jack Rumney (1898–1969), English footballer
- Ralph Rumney (1934–2002), English artist

== Places ==
- Rumney, Cardiff, Wales
- Rumney, New Hampshire, United States
- Electoral division of Rumney, Tasmania

== Other uses ==
- Rumney wine, produced in Greece in the 14th to 16th centuries

== See also ==
- Rhymney, a town in Wales
- Rhymney River, Wales
