= Ritson's Yorkshire Garland 1809 =

Book by Joseph Ritson

- Author: Joseph Ritson
- Language: English
- Genre: chapbook
- Publisher: Joseph Ritson
- Publication date: 1809
- Publication place: United Kingdom
- Media type: Print
- Pages: 32 pages and 6 works

Ritson's Yorkshire Garland, edited and published by Joseph Ritson, is a reprinted edition of a book on Yorkshire music, first published in 1788.

== Details ==
Yorkshire Garland 1809 (or to give it its full title - “The Yorkshire Garland; is a curious collection of old and new songs, concerning that famous county. [Edited by the Late Joseph Ritson, Esq.] ---- Part I. ----York: printed by N. Frobisher; and sold by J. Langdale, Northallerton MDCCLXXXVIII Licensed and entered according to Order ----London: reprinted by R. Triphook, St.Jame's Street; By Harding and Wright, St. John's-square. 1809”) is a book of folk songs consisting of 32 pages with 6 works, published in 1788. A further edition (this edition) was reprinted in 1809

Other books in Ritson’s Garland series were Bishopric Garland, The Northumberland Garland, and The North-Country Chorister. A compilation of the whole series, entitled The Northern Garland was published in 1810.

The “Garland” series was important, not only as an important document in its own right, but as one of the main sources of similar successor publications such as John Bell's Rhymes of Northern Bards and Bruce and Stokoe's Northumbrian Minstrelsy.

A set of original documents are held in The Robinson Library of Newcastle University

== Publication ==
The front cover of the book was as thus :-

THE
YORKSHIRE GARLAND;
BEING
A CURIOUS COLLECTION
OF
OLD AND NEW
SONGS,
CONCERNING THAT FAMOUS COUNTY.
[EDITED BY THE LATE
JOSEPH RITSON, ESQ.]
PART I.
- - - - - - -
YORK
PRINTED BY N. FROBISHER; AND SOLD BY J. LANGDALE
NORTHALLERTON
MDCCLXXXVIII
Licensed and entered according to Order
- - - - - - -
LONDON:
REPRINTED BY R. TRIPHOOK, ST.JAME'S STREET;
By Harding and Wright, St. John's-square.
1809

== Contents ==
are as below :-

	title	songwriter	tune	comments	notes	ref
cover	The Yorkshire Garland					
1	Contents					
3	Yorker, Yorker, for my monies - A new Yorkshire Song Intituled	W. E. (William Elder ton)				
12	Horse Race - (The)				Song II	
15	pattern of true love - (The) or Bowes Tragedy	a story		the spelling in the book		
15	comment on	Roger Wright son and Martha Rail ton				
16	clarification of Counties	Bowes and Barnard Castle				
17	name of a friend	Thomas Petty				
18	Bowes Tragedy		Queen Dido		Song III	
24	True and tragical song concerning Captain John Bolton &c - (A)		Fair lady, lay your costly robes aside		Song IV	
24	comment on	The story				
24	comment on Captain John Bolton (murderer)	Captain John Bolton of Bulmer near Castle-Howard				
24	comment on the victim	Elizabeth Rainbow of Ackwoth				
27	In praise of Yarm				Song V	
29	Gamblers fitted - (The)				Song VI	
31	FINIS					

== See also ==
Joseph Ritson
Ritson's Northern Garlands 1810
Ritson's Bishopric Garland or Durham Minstrel 1792
Ritson's Northumberland Garland or Newcastle Nightingale 1809
Ritson's North-Country Chorister 1809
