= Lists of Geordie song-related topics =

There are four Geordie song-related lists on Wikipedia:

- List of Geordie songwriters
- List of Geordie singers
- List of Geordie songbooks
- List of Geordie characters, events and places
