= Richard Sheale =

Richard Sheale of Tamworth was a 16th-century pedlar and minstrel for the Stanley family.

== Life ==
Sheale was a minstrel-retainer of the Earl of Derby about the middle of the 16th century. He was technically an itinerant vagabond, and (probably a skilful) beggar. He obtained most of his income "on the road". He was honest in so far as he preferred to pay his debts. He was married and, with the help of his wife, managed to save sixty pounds. Unfortunately in that he was stopped by highwaymen while crossing Dunsmore Heath (in Warwickshire and about 7 miles from Rugby) and his money stolen. He thought that he was safe carrying the money because of his reputation of his calling for poverty.

He wrote a song to tell of this tale, and possibly collected many times more by collection from the audience’s sympathy. Before his performance he pronounced that "his patron has given him letters, friends everywhere have contributed, and he hopes present company will do the same".

Sheale was like many other beggars of the time, in so far that his begging was better than his poetry, and much of the poetry or songs called on generous giving by the listeners.

By now, the days of the court jester were ending, yet there were still a few men, such as Richard Sheale, who managed, to some extent, to fill the shoes of the previous courtly minstrel of the Middle Ages.

Such were several "known" beggars who were generally decent beings, singing songs to educate. Some would join the several guilds of minstrels which gave, or claimed to give, those licensed by them protection from the law against vagabonds. But in the words of the poem "A Minstrel in the Stocks" (From one of the Roxburghe Ballads):-

Beggars they are with one consent,

And Rogues by act of Parliament.

Richard Searle, like many other itinerants, was able to perform tricks which amazed their hosts. One such trick was to hold a sheep’a bladder full of blood under his shirt, he would then stab himself, shortly after "arising from the dead"

== Works ==
These include :-

- The Hunting of the Cheviot (page 164)
- O God, what a world (page 170)
- An Elergy for Lady Margaret, Countess of Derby c1558 (page 175)
- The Ballad of Chevy Chase – has been generally attributed to the Lancashire born minstrel Richard Sheale although it is a far better quality than anything else he is known to have written

== See also ==
Geordie dialect words
John Collingwood Bruce
John Stokoe
Northumbrian Minstrelry by Bruce and Stokoe, 1882
Folk music of England
