= James Weams =

English comedian and performer

- Born: 1851; Durham, England
- Died: 1911 (aged 59–60)
- Occupations: Comedian, singer, songwriter, musician
- Years active: Late 19th century – early 20th century
- Notable work: "Neighbors Belaw" (The Neighbours Doon Belaa) "Lass on the Quay" (Sally Gee)

James Weams (1851 – 1911) was a Durham born comedian, and concert hall singer/songwriter and performer at the end of the 19th century and start of the 20th century. His most famous song is "Neighbors Belaw" (or now often called "The neighbours doon belaa").

== Early life ==
James Weams (correct surname Wemyss) was born in the City of Durham in 1851. He was a well-educated man and a first class all-round entertainer; a musician, comedian, singer and songwriter.

He worked as an entertainer on the (mainly local to the North East of England) music hall circuit and wrote songs and lyrics. He was an accomplished musician and, on several occasions, played 2nd violin in an orchestra too.

Weams contributed two especially great songs to the local repertoire. The first was "Neighbors Belaw" (now more often called "The neighbours doon belaa"), which was a humorous look at problems of life in a flat and was a favourite of Harry Nelson, one of Tyneside’s great music hall comedians of the day. The second was "The lass on the quay" (nicknamed “Sally Gee”, which was an irreverent look at love and the way “it is blind”

He retired eventually to Deptford, at that time an inner suburb of Sunderland, situated on the River Wear where he took on a public house. The Rowers Arms, Colin Place, Deptford, Sunderland, which has long since been demolished, as has the street.

== Works ==
These include :-

- Ejected - a tale of eviction
- Neighbors Belaw (or nbow often called "The neighbours doon belaa") - the troubles of living in a flat
- Lass on the Quay - a tale of love and Sally Gee
- Football Club (The) - one of only a few songs about football
- Gateshead Mash (The) - a song about a fancy dresser from Gateshead
- James Weams' Tyneside Song Book 1887 - an 8 page song book of some of his works

== Recordings ==
- Tim Healey on CD entitled "From Tyne to Tweed - Various Artists" includes "The Neighbours Doon Belaa" together with 19 other titles MWM Records ref (MWMCDSP52)

== See also ==
Geordie dialect words
James Weams' Tyneside Song Book 1887
