= Bernard Rumney =

Bernard Rumney (ca. 1600–1690) was a bard and musician from Rothbury, Northumberland, England.

Bernard Rumney was born around the end of the 16th and beginning of the 17th century. He was born, bred, lived and died in Rothbury where he was known as the village poet and musician. He was one of the churchwardens of the parish in 1662, and his death is recorded in the parish register of 11 June 1690.

His initials "B. R. 1660" were cut on a large stone block, originally one of the jambs in the old ingle nook of the Black Bull Inn, Rothbury. The inn, now demolished, had been the venue of the magistrates monthly meeting and the county court sessions. The stone was moved to the Newcastle House yard.

Rumney was the author of the peculiar and slightly humorous ballad An excellent ballad of the sickness, death, and burial, of Ecky's Mare, usually known as Ecky's Mare. The ballad appeared in Joseph Ritson's Northumberland Garland and in John Bell's Rhymes of Northern Bards.

== See also ==
- Geordie dialect words
- Joseph Ritson
- Ritson's Northumberland Garland or Newcastle Nightingale 1809
- John Bell
- Rhymes of Northern Bards
