= Matthew C. James =

Matthew C. James (1857 or 1858 – 1934) was a Tyneside marine draughtsman, naval architect and manager, who wrote songs and poems in the local Geordie dialect as a side-line and as a hobby.

== Working life ==
He started work at Mitchell’s Shipyard at Low Walker as an apprentice marine draughtsman. He moved jobs during the years following the completion of his apprenticeship, changing not only employers but also employment, taking posts with several companies including Robert Stephenson and Company. By 1892 he was naval architect and surveyor of the Prince Line, (became part of Furness Withy & Co in 1916 and Orient Overseas Container Line (OOCL) in 1980), responsible for the design of a large number of craft for the Shipping Line.

He remained with Prince Line until 1897 when he rose to the position of manager of the Mercantile Dry Dock at Jarrow.

== Music ==
Matthew C. James wrote numerous songs, many appearing in the local newspapers and periodicals, with some winning prizes. He often wrote under the semi-pseudonym of Matty C. James.

A book, Sum Tyneside Sangs was published in 1898 by Andrew Reid & Co. Ltd, containing a selection of songs written by "Matty C. James", all in dialect and all of which had previously appeared in either the "Newcastle Weekly Chronicle" or the "North of England Almanac", some having won the coveted first prize in their song competitions.

== Works ==
The following are some of his works :-

- Aad Tynesidor's greeting - (An)
- Billy's bicycle
- Carliol Tower - (The)
- Chinee cheps - (Them)
- Clerk upon the Quay - (A)
- Gyetshed volunteers - (The)
- Merry Christmas - (A)
- Monday mornin'. A song for hard times
- Newcassel fishwives - (The)
- Oot iv a job
- Pit lad at the races - (The)
- Quay on Monday mornin' - (The)
- Stivvison centennery - (The)
- Wor Peg's trip te the play

== See also ==
Geordie dialect words
Thomas Allan
Allan's Illustrated Edition of Tyneside Songs and Readings
