= Society of Antiquaries of Newcastle upon Tyne =

- Formation: 1813
- Type: Learned society
- Purpose: Historical & Archaeological
- Location: Newcastle upon Tyne
- Activities: Research & publications, lectures & events
- Collections: Archaeology, Coins, Bagpipes, Manuscripts
- President: Don O'Meara
- Affiliations: Great North Museum
- Website: newcastle-antiquaries.org.uk

The Society of Antiquaries of Newcastle upon Tyne, the oldest provincial antiquarian society in England, was founded in 1813. It is a registered charity under English law.

It has had a long-standing interest in the archaeology of the North East of England, particularly of Hadrian's Wall, but also covering prehistoric and medieval periods, as well as industrial archaeology. It has also maintained an interest in the traditional music of the north-east of England, and particularly the Northumbrian smallpipes.

The Society maintains several important collections. Its archaeological collection is held at the Great North Museum; its bagpipe collection, based on the collection assembled by William Cocks, is held in the Morpeth Chantry Bagpipe Museum; its collection of manuscripts is held at the Northumberland Record Office. Its journal is Archaeologia Aeliana, first published in 1822, and now published annually. The Great North Museum is also home to the Society's library, holding over 30,000 books, with a particular focus on local history and Roman Britain. Until 2013, the Society managed Newcastle Castle Keep and Black Gate, having leased the Keep in 1848 and the Gate in 1883 from the City, where they kept their library and, until 1960 when they were moved to the Museum of Antiquities, their collection of artefacts. The collection is now in the Great North Museum: Hancock in Newcastle upon Tyne.

Since 1886 the society, along with its sister society The Cumberland and Westmorland Antiquarian and Archaeological Society, has organised the Hadrian's Wall Pilgrimage.

== Membership ==
Membership of the society is open to anyone with an interest in history and archaeology, and provides access to monthly lectures as well as to the journal. A discounted student membership is also offered, running September to August to match the academic year. As of 2019, the Society has over 700 members.

A number of notable figures involved with the archaeology and history of northern England have held memberships of the Society, such as John Collingwood Bruce, John Clayton and Ian Richmond. Bridget Atkinson was made the Society's first honorary member in 1813, for her extensive coin collection and made donations to the societies collections.

=== List of presidents ===
- 1813 Sir John Swinburne
- 1861–1878 Henry Thomas Liddell
- 1879–1898 Henry George Liddell
- 1931–1932 Frederick Walter Dendy
- 1933–1934 Robert Carr Bosanquet
- 1935–1936 Charles Henry Hunter Blair
- 1937 Robert Cecil Hedley
- 1940–1941 Lt-Col George Redesdale Brooker Spain
- 1948–1950 Canon Thomas Romans
- 1951–1953 Sir Ian Richmond
- 1954–1956 William Percy Hedley
- 1957–1959 Eric Birley
- 1966–1967 John David Cowen
- 1973 John Philipson
- 1976–1977 George Jobey
- 1990–1992 Constance Frazer
- 1993–1995 Brian Dobson
- 1996–1998 Barbara Harbottle
- 2004 Beryl Charlton
- 2005–2007 Grace McCombie
- 2008–2010 David Breeze
- 2011–2013 Lindsay Allason-Jones
- 2014–2015 Derek Cutts
- 2016–2018 Richard Pears
- 2019–2022 Nick Hodgson
- 2022–2025 David Heslop
- 2025-present Don O'Meara

== Archaeologia Aeliana journal ==
Since 1822 the society has produced a journal which acts as a forum for the publication of research on the history, archaeology, and culture of the North East of England. The journal is named Archaeologia Aeliana, after the family of the Roman Emperor Hadrian, the Aeli. This name is also present in the Roman name for the settlement at Newcastle-upon-Tyne, Pons Aelius. The journal is particularly noted for its publications of excavations and research on Hadrian's Wall, and Roman archaeology more generally. Most of the past issues of the journal are available open access via the Archaeology Data Service website. The journal is published annually, and submissions of article is open to researchers whatever their professional affiliation.

== Traditional music ==
In 1855, the Society set up an Ancient Melodies Committee, with the object of collecting and preserving the characteristic songs and pipe music of the county. Its members were William Kell, John Clerevaulx Fenwick, and Robert White, together with John Collingwood Bruce a Secretary of the Society, appointed ex officio. In 1857, the Committee delivered a preliminary report to the Duke of Northumberland, with the pipers William Green and James Reid both providing musical illustrations. However, they were reluctant to publish at this stage, considering that the question of distinguishing Northumbrian tunes from Scottish or southern English ones deserved more work.

In the same year Thomas Doubleday wrote an open letter to the Duke, criticising the slow progress of the Committee's work. He also made some observations on the characteristics of the unkeyed Northumbrian smallpipes, with its distinctive closed fingering, which gives the instrument a brilliant staccato sound; he also lamented the tendency of some players to attempt inappropriate music, such as waltzes, on the newer keyed instrument.

The Committee's work seems to have stalled after the deaths of White and Kell, and Fenwick's move to London, but the Society published the Northumbrian Minstrelsy in 1882, edited by Rev. John Collingwood Bruce and John Stokoe. This played a significant role in supporting the traditional instrumental music and song of the north-east of England. However, many of the smallpipe tunes they published were drastically simplified, in particular dropping the variations found in the collection of John Peacock, which they had used as a source. They also used very few of the tunes in the William Vickers manuscript, which was in their possession. Though primarily a fiddler's tunebook, it does contain many local pipe tunes. They also ignored the playing of contemporary traditional pipers such as Old Tom Clough and Thomas Todd. Despite these shortcomings, the book was very significant in the revival of wider interest in the smallpipes and its music.

== See also ==
- List of Antiquarian Societies
