= George Jobey (archaeologist) =

- Born: 8 April 1918
- Died: 19 December 1991 (aged 73)
- Occupation: Archaeologist

Academic background
- Education: University of Durham

Academic work
- Discipline: Archaeology
- Sub-discipline: Prehistory
- Institutions: Newcastle University

Professor George Jobey, DSO, MA, FSA, Hon FSA (Scot) (8 April 1918 - 19 December 1991) was a British archaeologist and an officer in the British Army during the second world war. He was best known for his work on prehistoric sites in northern England and southern Scotland.

== Early life and war service ==
George Jobey was born in Percy Main, a part of North Shields on Tyneside. His father was a coal trimmer. He passed the examination to enter the local grammar school in North Shields, Tynemouth Municipal High School. He then got a place to train as a teacher at Bede College, part of the University of Durham. At Durham he was the President of the Durham University Boat Club and the President of the Durham University Historical Society. He graduated in 1939 with a BA in history. Part of his degree involved archaeology, and he was taught excavation techniques by Sir Ian Richmond. His dissertation was on the Roman fort at Carrawburgh.

After graduation he joined the Durham Light Infantry as an officer. He saw active service in North Africa and Italy. He was twice mentioned in dispatches and awarded the DSO. After he was severely wounded in the Italian campaign, he was transferred to the Royal Army Educational Corps. He had reached the rank of Major by the end of the war. After his discharge from the army, he returned to his old school at North Shields and taught history.

== Kings’ College Newcastle ==
In 1949 he moved to King's College Newcastle for a teaching role in the extra mural department which combined teaching evening classes with responsibility for military education in the region. In 1957 he became a full-time tutor there after the military part of his role was wound up. In 1967 he was promoted to senior staff tutor. King's college had by this time separated from Durham University to become Newcastle University.

== Archaeological work ==
Jobey carried out field work and excavation on the prehistoric and Roman settlements of the north of England and southern Scotland. Archaeological work in the area had previously been concentrated on the sites of the Roman period, especially around Hadrian's Wall. With the help of volunteers, often his extra mural students, he carried out a series of excavations showing how the native British settlements had developed in the region prior to the Roman period and their relationship with Roman sites. He also excavated sites threatened by the construction of the Kielder reservoir.

He promptly published the results of his excavations in a series of reports, mainly in the journals Archaeologia Aeliana and the Transactions of the Dumfriesshire & Galloway Natural History & Antiquarian Society, along with articles synthesizing the results of his work.

His obituary in Archaeologia Aeliana said “When George Jobey began his campaign of research into the native sites of our region, there existed a confused mass of fragmentary and puzzling scraps of information. Long before he retired from the university, he had replaced this with an orderly and intelligible analysis reflecting a clearly understood sequence of developments, and his conclusions stand the test of time”.

== Newcastle University ==
In the early 1970s Newcastle University created a new Department of Archaeology, bringing together the work on Roman archaeology previously done in the Department of Classics together with Jobey's work on prehistory. He became a Reader in the new department 1974 and received a personal Professorship of Prehistoric Archaeology in 1981.

After retirement in 1983 he continued research, working on the history of the local millstone industry and the history of cockfighting.

He was a member of the Royal Commission on Ancient and Historical Monuments of Scotland and the Ancient Monuments Board for Scotland. He became a Fellow of the Society of Antiquaries in 1960. He was also a member of the Society of Antiquaries of Newcastle-upon-Tyne, serving as secretary between 1957 and 1965 and as its president in 1977.

In 1981/1982 he was invited to give the Rhind Lectures at Edinburgh, his lectures were called Pre-Roman and Native Settlement between the Tyne and Forth.

== Honours and awards ==
He was awarded the DSO in 1944.

He was awarded an Honorary Fellowship of the Society of Antiquaries of Scotland.

Volume six of Archaeologia Aeliana in 1978 was dedicated to him for his 60th birthday.

Jobey's retirement was marked by two Festschriften: "Settlement in North Britain, 1000 BC-AD 1000: papers presented to George Jobey” and “Between and Beyond the Walls: essays on the prehistory and history of North Britain in honour of George Jobey“.
