= The Collier's Rant =

English folk song

"The Collier’s Rant"

Song
- Language: English (Geordie)
- Written: c. 1650 (possibly)
- Songwriter: Unknown

"The Collier’s Rant" is a traditional Geordie folk song written many years ago (possibly around 1650), the writer is unknown. It is one of the oldest mining songs in existence. It was already popular, and had been for how long we do not know, when Joseph Ritson published it in his Northumbrian Garland in 1793. It is still a very popular piece by choirs throughout the North East of England.

== Lyrics ==
There have been mine disasters as long as coal has been mined, going back long before medieval times. Some of these have been caused by gasses (the first reference to an explosion in a North East mine appears to have been in 1621), some by rock falls, and some by plain carelessness.

From early times the miners had viewed the pit with suspicion, and it was part folk lore, part fright, and part plain superstition, that many of the disasters had been attributed to the de’il (the devil) or his henchmen who lived at the bottom of the shaft in every pit. This old north eastern song confirms the superstition.

The song appears in many publications including Joseph Cawhall’s “A beuk o’ Newcassel sangs” published in 1888:

As me an' me marra was gannin' to wark,
We met wi' the devil, it was i' the dark;
Aw up wi' mi pick, it being i' the neet,
Aw knock't off his horns, likewise his club-feet.

Chorus:
Foller the horses, Johnny me laddie,
Foller them through, me canny lad, oh!
Foller the horses, Johnny me laddie,
Oh lad lye away, me canny lad, oh!

As me an' me marra was puttin' the tram,
The lowe it went oot, and me marra went wrang;
Ye wad ha' laughed had ye seen the gam,
The De'il tyeuk me marra, but aw gat the tram.

Oh marra, oh marra, what dost thou think?
I've broken me bottle and spilt a' me drink;
I've lost a' me shin-splints amang the greet stanes;
Draw me to the shaft, lad, it's time to gan hyem.

Oh Marra, oh Marra, where hest thou been?
Drivin' the drift frae the low seam,
Drivin' the drift frae the low seam,
Ha'd up the lowe, lad, De'il stop oot thy e'en!

Oh marra, oh marra, this is wor pay week,
We'll get penny loaves, and drink to wor beek;
And we'll fill up wor bumper, and roond it shall go,
Follow the horses, me Johnny lad, oh!

There is me horse, and there is me tram,
Twee horns full o' grease will myek her to gan;
There is me hoggers, likewise me half-shoon,
And smash me heart, marra, me puttin's a' deun!

== Recordings ==
Thomas Allen from Songs of Northumbria – volume II (reference number MWMCDSP87). The song was arranged and conducted by David Haslam With the Northumbria Concert Orchestra & Chorus The CD was recorded in 1993, and included 28 songs in total.

Appletwig Songbook recorded a version of The Collier’s Rant on The Miner’s Welfare (2012).

== See also ==
- Geordie dialect words
