= Elsie Marley =

English alewife and subject of a traditional song

Elsie Marley (c. 1713–1768) was an alewife who lived in Picktree, near Chester-le-Street, County Durham, England. This is close to Harraton Hall, the home of the Lambton family. A song and jig tune bearing her name, popular in her lifetime, are still played locally.

== Life ==
A surprising amount is known about the life of Alice (Elsie) Marley, from birth and marriage records, from newspaper accounts of her death, and from Cuthbert Sharp’s notes on the song about her life, prepared in consultation with her grandson.

Her birth name, Alice Harrison, being common, a firm identification seems impossible, but she may well be the Alice Harrison christened in Houghton-le-Spring, on 24 August 1713. This is not far from Chester-le-Street, and this birth date is consistent with the date of her marriage. In 1735 she became the first wife of Ralph Marley, who kept a public house at Picktree, near Chester-le-Street, County Durham. They had eight children. She was well-known in her lifetime - in 1765 at Beverley races, one of the horses was Mr. Wormley's bay mare, 'Alcey Marley', suggesting her name was well known.

According to Cuthbert Sharp, writing some 50 years after her death, the inn bore the sign of the Swan, with the appropriate motto:-

“The Swan doth love the water clear,
And so does man good ale and beer.”

She was a handsome, buxom, bustling landlady, and by her efforts, made the Swan a financial success. However, on their march towards Scotland during the Jacobite risings in 1745, the Dutch mercenary troops used the inn for target practice, and it remained "in a tattered condition" for many years after.

She suffered from a long, severe illness, and on 5 August 1768, was found drowned in a flooded coal pit near Vigo, near Birtley, Tyne and Wear. It was presumed she had accidentally fallen in, and because of her weak state, had been unable to climb out. The report in the Newcastle Chronicle reads "Thursday sen'night, in the morning, Alice Marley, Vigo, near Chester-le-Street, remarkable for the celebrated song composed upon her, was found drowned in a pond near that place." The account in the Newcastle Courant is more detailed: "Yesterday sen'night the well-known Alice Marley, of Picktree near Chester-le-Street, shaking in fever, got out of her house and went into a field where there was an old coal(pit) full of water, which she fell into, and was drowned." Both make clear she had been a local celebrity.

Her youngest son, Harrison Marley, in turn had a son (her grandson) called Ralph, who was known to be alive c. 1825. Ralph was cited as one of Cuthbert Sharp's informants in his notes on the song "Elsie Marley".

== The song and tune ==
Elsie Marley gave her name to a spirited and lively jig, as well as a humorous song to the same tune, about her life, indexed by Roud as Roud 3065. The lyric is in the same metre as the verse on the sign of The Swan, which may well be deliberate. One verse of the song, not printed in Ritson's early version, but noted by Sharp some years later as being current in the neighbourhood, reads:

Elsie Marley wore a straw hat
But now she's getten a velvet cap
The Lambton lads mun pay for that
Do ye ken Elsie Marley, hinny?

This hints at a relationship between her and the sons of the Lambton family, two of whom served as M.P. for Durham. It might be a later addition, but may well have been omitted from the early printed text to avoid offending the Lambtons. The words in the last verse, "hoping there's none I do offend" tends to confirm the latter.

It is mentioned as "the celebrated song" in the Newcastle Chronicle's account of her death. The words were first published by Joseph Ritson in The Bishopric Garland, 1784. The song is described as “anonymous” in The Bishoprick Garland of 1834 compiled by Sir Cuthbert Sharp. The song also appears in Rhymes of Northern Bards compiled by John Bell. Both the tune and the song are still widely known in the North-East; the tune was recorded by Tom Clough on his His Master's Voice recording of smallpipes in 1929, and the song by the High Level Ranters on their 1976 album Ranting Lads.

The tune is also referenced in the lyrics of "Byker Hill", another traditional Northeast English folk song.

An early and consistent three-strain version appears in a collection by Robert Topliff, from about 1815. A less consistent, but similar, 4-strain version appeared at about the time of Elsie's death in Robert Bremner's 'Collection of Scots Reels', compiled in Edinburgh, and a rather different 2-strain version is found in the William Vickers manuscript from Newcastle, dated 1770.

The distinctive harmonic pattern of this mixolydian mode tune is very common in Northumbrian and Border music, and specifically music for Border pipes. Some 13 of the 40 tunes in the William Dixon manuscript follow the same scheme, or one of its variants. There were tunes with this structure well before the appearance of this tune, but it is perhaps the best known example of the type.

== See also ==
- Geordie dialect words
