= James' Sum Tyneside Sangs 1898 =

Book by Matthew C. James

- Author: Matthew C. James
- Language: English (Geordie dialect)
- Genre: chapbook
- Publisher: Matthew C. James
- Publication date: 1898
- Publication place: United Kingdom
- Media type: Print
- Pages: approximately 28 pages and 14 songs

James' Sum Tyneside Sangs 1898 is a chapbook on Tyneside music, published in 1898.

== Details ==
Sum Tyneside Sangs (or to give it its full title – "Sum Tyneside Sangs: A collection of Prize Songs, &c, in the Tyneside Dialect, by Matt. C. James ---- Reprinted from the "Newcastle Weekly Chronicle" and the "North of England Almanac" ----Price Threepence ---- Newcastle-upon-Tyne Printed by Andrew Reid & Company, Limited ---- 1898 ”) is a book of Geordie folk song, all written by Matthew C. James, consisting of approximately 28 pages with 14 songs, published in 1898.

A later edition taking 48 pages was reprinted and was sold in Aid of the Jarrow "Guild of Help"

== The publication ==
The front cover of the book was as thus :-

SUM TYNESIDE SANGS:
A COLLECTION OF
Prize Songs, &c, in the Tyneside Dialect,
BY
MATT. C. JAMES.
– - – - – - -
Reprinted from the "Newcastle Weekly Chronicle" and the
"North of England Almanac"
– - – - – - -
PRICE THREEPENCE
– - – - – - -
Newcastle-upon-Tyne
PRINTED BY ANDREW REID & COMPANY, LIMITED.
– - – - – - -
1898

== Contents ==
	title	songwriter	tune	comments	ref
1	Front cover	Matthew C. James			
2	blank	Matthew C. James			
3	Aad Tynesidor's greeting – (An)	Matthew C. James	It's English, you know	1st prize in "Newcastle weekly chronicle" competition for August 1888	
5	Oot iv a job	Matthew C. James	Betty Broon	1st prize in "North of England almanac" competition 1886	
7	Monday mornin'. A song for haird times	Matthew C. James	The fiery clock fyece	1st prize im "North of England almanac" competition 1886	
9	Billy's bicikkle	Matthew C. James	Cappy	1st prize in "North of England almanac" competition.	
11	Merry Christmas – (A)	Matthew C. James	Come, Mally! poke the fire a bit	From "Newcastle weekly chronicle" December 1881	
12	Carliol Tower – (The)	Matthew C. James	Betty Broon	From "Newcastle weekly chronicle" May 1880	
14	Clerk upon the Quay – (A)	Matthew C. James	The suit of corduroy	From "Newcastle weekly chronicle" December 1880	
16	Quay on Sunday mornin' – (The)	Matthew C. James	Lambton worme	From "Newcastle weekly chronicle" May 1880	
18	Pit lad at the races – (The)	Matthew C. James	The fiery clock fyece	From "Newcastle weekly chronicle" May 1880	
20	Newcassel fishwives – (The)	Matthew C. James	Bonnie keel lassie	From "Newcastle weekly chronicle" August 1880	
20	comment on	Matthew C. James			
21	comment on	Matthew C. James			
21	comment on	Matthew C. James			
21	comment on	Matthew C. James			
22	Wor Peg's trip te the play	Matthew C. James	Cappy	From "Newcastle weekly chronicle" March 1880	
23	Gyetshed volunteers – (The)	Matthew C. James	Thor's bund to be a row	From "Newcastle weekly chronicle" April 1880	
25	Chinee cheps – (Them)	Matthew C. James	Billy Oliver	From "Newcastle weekly chronicle" 1881	
27	Stivvison centennery – (The)	Matthew C. James	Peggy's trip to Tinmouth	From "Newcastle weekly chronicle" June 1881	

== See also ==
- Geordie dialect words
- Matthew C. James
- Thomas Allan
- Allan's Illustrated Edition of Tyneside Songs and Readings
