= Jack Rumney =

English footballer (1898–1979)

Personal information
- Full name: John Rumney
- Date of birth: 1 May 1898
- Place of birth: Dipton, County Durham, England
- Date of death: 1979 (aged 80–81)
- Position: Centre forward

Senior career*
Years	Team	Apps	(Gls)
1919–1920	Leadgate Park		
1920–1921	Annfield Plain		
1921	Leadgate Park		
1921	West Stanley		
1922	Preston Colliery		
1922–1924	Hull City	13	(4)
1924–1925	Chesterfield	11	(4)
1925–1926	Merthyr Town	39	(24)
1926–1927	Bristol Rovers	8	(2)
1927–1929	Consett		
1929	Chester-le-Street		
1930	Dipton United		
Total		71	(34)
- * Club domestic league appearances and goals

John Rumney (1 May 1898 – 1979) was an English footballer who played in the Football League for Bristol Rovers, Chesterfield, Hull City and Merthyr Town.
