= James Weams' Tyneside Song Book 1887 =

Book by James Weams

- Author: James Weams
- Language: English (Geordie dialect)
- Genre: chapbook
- Publisher: John B. Barnes, Printer, 5, Groat Market, Newcastle
- Publication date: 1887
- Publication place: United Kingdom
- Media type: Print
- Pages: 8 pages

James Weams' Tyneside Song Book 1887 is a chapbook style songbook, giving the lyrics of local, now historical songs. It was published by John B. Barnes, Printer, 5, Groat Market, Newcastle in 1887.

== Details ==
James Weams' Tyneside Song Book 1887 (full title - “No 1 James Weams’ Tyneside Song Book, Written and Sung by himself in the Principal Music Halls in the North. -- Newcastle-on-Tyne: John B. Barnes, Printer, 5, Groat Market – 1887) is a Chapbook of Geordie folk songs consisting of 8 pages and 5 song lyric, all written (and sung – we are told in the title) by the author James Weams, published in 1877.

== The publication ==
It is, as the title suggests, a collection of songs which would have been popular, or topical, at the date of publication. There is nothing in the way of biographies of the author (other than comments on the front cover) or histories of the events.

The front cover of the book was as thus :-

No 1
JAMES WEAMS'
TYNESIDE
Song Book
Written and Sung by himself in the Principal Music
Halls
in the North
CONTENTS -
EJECTED
NEIBORS BELAW
LASS ON THE QUAY
THE FOOTBALL CLUB
THE GATESHEAD MASHER

Music to any of these Songs, 7 stamps

PS. --- For Evening Concerts of Full Concert
Parties --- Address J WEAMS, Tyneside Comedian,
103 Abbott Street, Gateshead

Newcastle-on-Tyne:
JOHN B. BARNES, Printer, 5, Groat Market
1887

== Contents ==
Are as below :-

page	title	songwriter	tune	comments	Notes	Ref
1	front cover	James Wearms				
2	Ejected	James Wearms		a tale of eviction		
3	Neighbors Belaw	James Wearms		the troubles of living in a flat - Neighbors Belaw (or now often called "The neighbours doon belaa")		
5	Lass on the Quay	James Wearms		a tale of love and Sally Gee		
6	Football Club (The)	James Wearms		one of only a few songs about football		
7	Gateshead Mash (The)	James Wearms		a song about a fancy dresser from Gateshead		

== See also ==
Geordie dialect words
James Weams
