= Hadston Skeers =

Coordinates: 55.30311°N 1.55714°W

Hadston Skeers (or Carrs) (Ordnance Survey reference NU 283428) are towards the northern End of Druridge Bay, Northumberland. They are made up of shelves of flat rocks, extending out into the North Sea for some distance, maybe half a mile, and are edged with weed-covered rocks.
This area is ideal for fish, particularly cod, and they are usually populated with numerous sea fishermen, even more so when conditions are right.

Fairly close by are Bondi Carrs (Ordnance Survey reference NU 286 018) form a large barrier at the northern end of Druridge Bay, near Low Hauxley, Amble.
The Green Skeers are further south and run for approximately 200 yard (60 m) along the beach at around the mid-tide mark.

The words skear (also spelt skeer, skere, and skerr) and carr, are Geordie dialect given to an area of low coastal rocks.

== See also ==
Geordie dialect words
