= Hi, canny man =

Song performed by Harry Nelson

"Hi, canny man hoy a ha'penny oot"

Song by Harry Nelson
- Language: English (Geordie)
- Written: c. 1862
- Published: 1862
- Songwriter(s): Harry Nelson

"Hi, canny man hoy a ha'penny oot" is a famous Geordie folk song written in the 19th century by Harry Nelson, in a style deriving from music hall. Nelson was a well-known Geordie singer/comedian in the late 19th/early 20th century and is credited with writing the song.

== Lyrics ==
The song is based on the old Geordie tradition, which was still a common occurrence in the 1950s, and still (very occasionally) takes place today. As the bride and groom were leaving the church, they would throw coppers to the boys and girls gathered around outside. This would be to calls from the youngsters of "Hoy oot" or similar. These words were eventually written into the song – as "Hi, canny man hoy a ha'penny oot, Ye'll see some fun thor is ne doot, Where ivvor Aa gan ye'll heor them shoot, Hi, canny man, hoy a ha'penny oot."

HI, CANNY MAN

Ne doot ye aall knaa whe Aa am, so Aa've come here te tell ye,
The way the folks aall laugh at me, it's nearly drove me crazy,
If Aa put on me Sunday claes at neet when Aa gan oot,
The folks aroond the neyborhood is sure to start an' shoot.

Chorus:
Hi, canny man, hoy a ha'penny oot,
Ye'll see some fun thor is ne doot,
Where ivvor Aa gan ye'll heor them shoot,
Hi, canny man, hoy a ha'penny oot.

Once Aa went te see the play - Aa made the folks aall glower,
A chep says that's "Aad Monkey Nuts", 'twas then Aa said "Give ower",
Aa teuk a front seat in the staals, commenced to leuk aboot,
When ivorybody in the place, at once began te shoot.

Chorus:

Once Aa thought that Aa'd get wed - née langer Aa wad tarry,
Aa bowt the ring, so off Aa went, ma single life te "barry",
The Parson got the sarvice ower, then Aa began te "laff",
When coming oot th' church agyen, the folks began te chaff,

SPOKEN:- Chaff, Aa think they did, an' shoot at the top o' thor voices -

Chorus:

== Comments on variations to the above version ==
In the early 19th century, as today, there were cheap books and magazines.

Many of these "chapbooks" were on poor quality paper to a poor standard and with poor quality print. The works were copied with no thoughts of copyright, and the work required very little proof-reading, and what was done was not required to a high standard. Consequently, the dialect words of songs varied between editions.

This particular song shows several variations between the various published versions, some very minor, mainly in the spelling of the words, and sometimes variations within the same edition. Some of the most common are listed below:

Generally

all and aall
iverybody and ivorybody
te and to
than and then
the and th'
tuek and teuk

=== Discography ===
The same artist also recorded "Our Jennie", both later in his career, and both have survived and are available on the CD "Various Artists - Wor Nanny's A Mazer: Early Recordings Of Artists From The North East 1904-1933" (on Phonograph, PHCD2K1) The full list of tracks on this CD are as follows:

order	title	artist
1	Wor Nanny's A Mazer	C. Ernest Catcheside Warrington
2	Blaydon Races	J.C. Scatter
3	Alpine Echoes	Harton Colliery Band
4	Geordie Haad The Bairn	Jamieson Dodds
5	Cushy Butterfield	C. Ernest Catcheside Warrington
6	Hi, canny man	Harry Nelson
7	The Neighbors Doon Belaa	Jamieson Dodds
8	Tyneside Policeman	J.C. Scatter
9	The Cliffs Of Old Tynemouth	C. Ernest Catcheside Warrington
10	Our Jemmie (with patter)	Harry Nelson
11	Johnson and High Level Hornpipe	Jas. Brown
12	Keep Your Feet Still Geordie Hinny	Dewey Gibson
13	Last Night	C. Ernest Catcheside Warrington
14	Adam Buckam O!, Wrap Up	Ernest J. Potts
15	Whistling Geordie	Jimmy James
16	The Keel Row	Anthony Charlton
17	Hexham Races (Northumbrian Smallpipes)	Felton Lonnin
18	Albert Before The Means Test Committee Parts 1 & 2	Albert Burdon & Company

== See also ==
Geordie dialect words

== Recordings ==
- Harry Nelson – sings "Hi, Canny Man" on the CD -
