= Wor Peg's Trip te Tynemouth =

Song performed by Joe Wilson

"Wor Peg's Trip te Tynemouth (sub-titled A Reglor Cawshun)"

Song by Joe Wilson
- Language: English ((Geordie)
- Written: 1800s

"Wor Peg's Trip te Tynemouth" (sub-titled "A Reglor Cawshun") is a Geordie folk song written in the 19th century by Joe Wilson, in a style deriving from music hall.

This song tells a friendly, warm-hearted story about a day on the beach. It includes a reference to the new idea of “bathing machines” (In tiv a fine masheen she ran).

== Lyrics ==
The song appears in the “Tyneside Songs” chapbook. The cover has a patterned border and written on it is:-
“The Canny Newcassel foaks fireside budjit Joe Wilson’s Tyneside Songs, Ballads and Drolleries. Part 1, price sixpence. Entered at Stationers Hall. Original Fireside Pictors, Draws i’ wor awn awd canny toon style, By Joe Wilson. And sung by him with immense success at the “Tyne” and “Oxford” Music Halls, Newcastle. Printed by Joe Wilson.”
And vertically at either side of a central picture is
“Copyright. Deddycated to tiv iverybody. Full o’ fun, drols, wisdom an’ sittera".
It is not known exactly when the book was published, but we can estimate that it was sometime between 1865 and 1869:

The sun wes shinin i' the west,
An' aw wes shinin i' me best,
An' Peggy like a queen wes drest,
The day we went te Tynemouth, O.
Upon the sands, byeth happy, we
Injoy'd the breezes frae the sea,
An' wish'd the day a week might be
Upon the sands at Tynemouth, O.

Alang the sands we myed wor way,
Like plodgers on a rainy day,
The lasses bonny feet display
Upon the sands at Tynemouth, O;
Sum fiddlers thre te myek thor brass
Played teuns te tice byeth land and lass,
For dancin steps nyen cud surpass,
Maw cumley Peg at Tynemouth, O.

The dancin deun, says Peg te me,
"Thor's lasses bathin i' the sea,
An'if ye'll haud me claes", says she,
"Aw'll hev a bathe at Tynemouth, O."
"No, Peg", says aw, "no, dinnet gan!"
"What flaid", says she, "are ye a man?"
In tiv a fine masheen she ran,
Te change her claes at Tynemouth, O.

Aw stud dumbfoonded, stiff, an' mute,
An' hoped she nivor might cum oot,
Te show her-sel te croods aboot,
That watch foaks bathe at Tynemouth, O.
At last, gud grashus, Peg fell doon
The steps,-- aw thowt twes iv a swoon,
Up she gets iv a lang blue goon,
Amang the waves at Tynemouth, O.

Then Peg's reed heed wes plainly seen,
Wiv figor that wad mense a queen,
Aw wish'd beside her aw had been
Amang the waves at Tynemouth, O.
Upon the shore,--the bathin deun,
Peg ful o' live an' full o' fun,
Got on a cuddy's back te run
Alang the sands at Tynemouth, O.

But plishur often wid brings pain,
Byeth sad an' sair we sowt the train,
For Peggy's hoops, she myed o' cane,
Wes lost that day at Tynemouth, O;
She sadly sighed, wi' leuk se meek,
An' laid here heed agyen me cheek,
But kiss an' cuddle myed her speak,
I' cummin hyem frae Tynemouth, O.

== See also ==
Geordie dialect words
