= Harry Nelson (singer) =

Harry Nelson (1804-????) was a Newcastle upon Tyne concert hall singer and comedian of the late 19th/early 20th century. He is credited with writing "Hi, canny man hoy a ha'penny oot"

== Works ==
Harry Nelson made a few recordings right at the end of his career, which included "Hi, canny man" and "Our Jemmie" (or "Oh, hey ye seen wor Jimmie"), both of which songs are still popular in Tyneside folk clubs. Both these songs survived and are available on the CD Various Artists - Wor Nanny's A Mazer: Early Recordings Of Artists From The North East 1904-1933 (on Phonograph, PHCD2K1) The full list of tracks on this CD are as follows:

order	title	artist
1	"Wor Nanny’s a mazer"	C. Ernest Catcheside Warrington
2	"Blaydon Races"	J.C. Scatter
3	"Alpine Echoes"	Harton Colliery Band
4	"Geordie Haad The Bairn"	Jamieson Dodds
5	"Cushy Butterfield"	C. Ernest Catcheside Warrington
6	"Hi, canny man"	Harry Nelson
7	"The Neibors Doon Belaa"	Jamieson Dodds
8	"Tyneside Policeman"	J.C. Scatter
9	"The Cliffs of Old Tynemouth"	C. Ernest Catcheside Warrington
10	"Our Jemmie (with patter)"	Harry Nelson
11	"Johnson and High Level Hornpipe"	Jas. Brown
12	"Keep Your Feet Still Geordie Hinny"	Dewey Gibson
13	"Last Night"	C. Ernest Catcheside Warrington
14	"Adam Buckam O!, Wrap Up"	Ernest J. Potts
15	"Whistling Geordie"	Jimmy James
16	"(Weel May) The Keel Row"	Anthony Charlton
17	"Hexham Races" (Northumbrian Smallpipes)	Felton Lonnin
18	"Albert Before The Means Test Committee Parts 1 & 2"	Albert Burdon & Company

== Recordings ==
- Harry Nelson – sings "Hi, Canny Man" and "Our Jemmie" on the Various Artists CD, Wor Nanny's A Mazer: Early Recordings Of Artists From The North East 1904-1933.

Harry Nelson made his three records (six sides) just before the outbreak of World War I, only months before his death. Therefore, the birth date of 1804 appears to be too early - he was performing right until the end.

== See also ==
- Geordie dialect words
