= Thomas Whittle (poet) =

English poet, songwriter and artist

Thomas Whittle (1683–1736) was a Tyneside, England, poet/songwriter, artist and eccentric spanning the late 17th to early 18th centuries.

== Early life ==
Thomas Whittle appeared at Cambo around 1700 riding on an old goat. It was suggested by Thomas Allan in his book Allan's Illustrated Edition of Tyneside Songs and Readings that he could have been born at Long Edlingham, Ovingham or Shilbottle, and that his brother was the parish clerk at Earsdon in 1750. In fact, his name may have been originally spelt "Whittel". It has been suggested that he was christened at Kirkwhelpington on 10 September 1683.

He was employed by an old miller, for whom he worked for years. He became, according to William Brockie quoting from Mackenzie's Northumberland (published 1825), and Thomas Allan's Illustrated Edition of Tyneside Songs and Readings, a disciple of "Bacchus", the Greek god of wine (Roman = Dionysus) and remained so for the rest of his life.

== Later life ==
He died in East Shaftoe (near Killingworth) on 19 April 1736, and was buried at Hartburn.

== Legacy ==
He was a talented, versatile artist and some relics of his workmanship were to be seen at Belsay Castle, Hartburn, Ponteland, and other churches in Northumberland.

In addition, his poems and songs were popular, particularly among the rural inhabitants of Northumberland.

== Works ==
- The Insipids - or The Mistress with her Multitude of Man Servants appears in Allan's Illustrated Edition of Tyneside Songs and Readings.
- Little Moody, Razor-setter appears in both Allan's Illustrated Edition of Tyneside Songs and Readings and is called "His Humorous Letter To Master Moody, the Razor-Setter" in Bell's Rhymes of Northern Bards 1812
- The Midford Galloway's Ramble appears in Bell's Rhymes of Northern Bards 1812
- Sawney Ogilby's Duel with his Wife appears in both Allan's Illustrated Edition of Tyneside Songs and Readings and Bell's Rhymes of Northern Bards 1812
- Short biography appears in both Allan's Illustrated Edition of Tyneside Songs and Readings and Bell's Rhymes of Northern Bards 1812
- Song - On William Carstairs, Schoolmaster – a song to a contemporary and sometime friend appears in both Allan's Illustrated Edition of Tyneside Songs and Readings and Bell's Rhymes of Northern Bards 1812
- An edition of his poetical works was published in 1815 by another poetry lover, long after his death, and which resulted in a short revival of his popularity.

== See also ==
- Geordie dialect words
- Allan's Illustrated Edition of Tyneside Songs and Readings
- Rhymes of Northern Bards
