= Bobby Shafto's Gone to Sea =

Traditional song

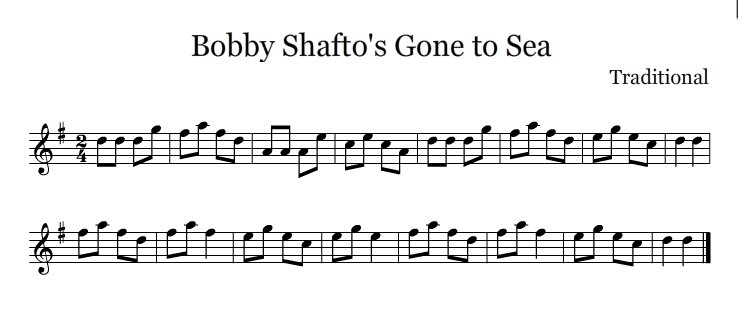
- Sheet music

Nursery rhyme
- Published: 1805
- Songwriter: Traditional

"Bobby Shafto's Gone to Sea" or "Bobby Shafto" (frequently spelled Shaftoe) (Roud 1359) is a North-East English folk song and nursery rhyme.

== Lyrics ==
The most common modern version is:

Bobby Shafto's gone to sea,
Silver buckles at his knee;
He'll come back and marry me,
Bonny Bobby Shafto!

Bobby Shafto's bright and fair,
Combing down his yellow hair;
He's my love for evermore,
Bonny Bobby Shafto!

This is very close to the earliest printed version in 1805. A version published in John Bell's Rhymes of Northern Bards (1812) gives these additional verses:

Bobby Shafto's tall and slim,
He always dressed so neat and trim;
The ladies they all kick at him,
Bonny Bobby Shafto.

Bobby Shafto's gettin' a bairn,
For to dangle on his arm;
In his arm and on his knee,
Bobby Shafto loves me.

Other publications have made changes to some of the words, including the spelling of the last name:

Bobby Shaftoe's gone to sea,
With silver buckles on his knee;
He'll come back and marry me,
Pretty Bobby Shaftoe!

Bobby Shaftoe's fat and fair,
Combing down his yellow hair;
He's my love for evermore,
Pretty Bobby Shaftoe!

A variant in the Northumbrian dialect:

Bobby Shaftoe's gyen to sea,
Silver buckles at his knee;
He'll come back an' marry me,
Bonny Bobby Shaftoe.

Bobby Shaftoe's bright and fair,
Kaimin' doon his yellow hair;
He's my awn for iver mair,
Bonny Bobby Shaftoe.

== Origins ==
Iona and Peter Opie (folklorists) have argued for an identification of the original Bobby Shafto with a resident of Hollybrook, County Wicklow, Ireland, who died in 1737. However, the tune derives from the earlier "Brave Willie Forster", found in the Henry Atkinson manuscript from the 1690s, and the William Dixon manuscript, from the 1730s, both from north-east England; besides these early versions, there are two variation sets for Northumbrian smallpipes, by John Peacock, from the beginning of the 19th century, and by Tom Clough, from the early 20th century. The song is also associated with the region, having been used by the supporters of Robert Shafto (sometimes spelt Shaftoe; c.1732–1797), who was an eighteenth-century British Member of Parliament (MP) for County Durham, and later the borough of Downton in Wiltshire. Supporters used another verse in the 1761 election:

Bobby Shafto's looking out,
All his ribbons flew about,
All the ladies gave a shout,
Hey for Bobby Shafto!

The song is said to relate the story of how he broke the heart of Bridget Belasyse of Brancepeth Castle, County Durham, where his brother Thomas was rector, when he married Anne Duncombe of Duncombe Park in Yorkshire. Bridget Belasyse is said to have died two weeks after hearing the news.

Thomas & George Allan, in their illustrated edition of Tyneside Songs and Readings (1891), argued that the "Bobby Shafto" of the song was in fact the MP's son, although the father fits the description in the lyrics better. It is likely that the MP's grandson, Robert Duncombe Shafto, also used the song for electioneering in 1861, with several of the later verses being added around this time.
