= Eneas Mackenzie =

English topographer (1778–1832)

Eneas Mackenzie (1778–1832) was an English topographer.

== Life ==
He was born in Aberdeenshire; his parents moved to Newcastle upon Tyne, when he was three years old. After working with his father as a shoemaker, he became a Baptist minister, and then made an unsuccessful attempt to establish himself in business as a broker at Sunderland. Returning to Newcastle he opened a school, which he gave up and worked as a printer and publisher.

Mackenzie was mainly instrumental in founding the Mechanics' Institution in Newcastle, where his bust was preserved. He was a liberal in politics, and one of the secretaries of the Northern Political Union. He died at Newcastle on 21 February 1832.

== Works ==
His works include :-

- "A Descriptive and Historical Account of the Town and County of Newcastle-upon-Tyne including the Borough of Gateshead, Volume I", by Eneas MacKenzie, published 1818.
- "An historical, topographical and descriptive view of the County Palatine of Durham; comprehending the various subjects of Natural, Civil and Ecclesiastical Geography, Agriculture, Mines, Manufactures, Navigation, Trade, Commerce, Buildings, Antiquities, Curiosities, Public Institutions, Charities, Population, Customs, Biography, Local History &c. Volume II" – (E. Mackenzie and [continued by] M. Ross)

These above two works contain quoted passages in Geordie dialect, or older style English.

- "A New, Improved, and Authentic Life of James Allan: The Celebrated Northumberland Piper, Detailing His Surprising Adventures in Various Parts of Europe" - by James Thompson, Eneas Mackenzie
- Mackenzie, Eneas Tyler (1818). An Historical, Topographical, and Descriptive View of the United States of America, and of Upper and Lower Canada. Newcastle upon Tyne: Mackenzie and Dent.
- "Memoirs of Mrs. Caroline Chisholm ... To Which Is Added, A History Of The Family Colonization Loan Society" - by Eneas Mackenzie, Caroline Chisholm.
