= Northumbrian Minstrelsy =

Book by John Collingwood Bruce

- Author: John Collingwood Bruce and John Stokoe
- Language: English, many in Geordie dialect
- Publisher: Society of Antiquaries of Newcastle upon Tyne
- Publication date: 1882
- Publication place: United Kingdom
- Media type: Print
- Pages: 206 pages

Northumbrian Minstrelsy is a book of 18th- and 19th-century North East of England folk songs and pipe music, intended to be a lasting historical record. The book was edited by John Stokoe and the Rev John Collingwood Bruce LL.D., F.S.A., and published by and on behalf of the Society of Antiquaries of Newcastle upon Tyne in 1882. It was reprinted in 1965 by Folklore Associates, Hatboro, Pennsyslvania, with a foreword by A. L. Lloyd.

== Details ==
Northumbrian Minstrelsy was written with the intention of providing a historical record of some of the North Country songs and music. "A book for the collection and preservation of the old music and poetry of the North of England" was what Algernon Percy, 4th Duke of Northumberland had suggested.

The book is divided into two sections; the first giving the lyrics (with some music) of local, now historical songs, and the second part giving the music to many Northumbrian smallpipe tunes with very few lyrics. The book was edited by John Stokoe and the Rev John Collingwood Bruce, with the help of committee members, and published by and behalf, of the Ancient Melodies Committee of the Society of Antiquaries of Newcastle upon Tyne in 1882.

== Background ==
The project first started in 1855 after Algernon Percy, 4th Duke of Northumberland, patron of the Society of Antiquaries of Newcastle upon Tyne, expressed a desire that the Society should turn its attention to the collection and preservation of the old music and poetry of the North East of England. A committee was appointed, consisting of Robert White, John Clerevaulx Fenwick, and William Kell (1797–1862); with Bruce, a member of the society, acting in an ex-officio role.

Robert White was a farmer's son from Kirk Yetholm, Northumberland, who worked all his life in a brass foundry in Newcastle. He was an avid researcher into Northumberland legends, folklore and folk songs, writing regularly for local newspapers on local matters. John Clerevaulx Fenwick was the son of a lay-preacher, a lawyer by profession, a lover of pipe-music and author of a small (18-page) book, A Few Remarks Upon Bagpipes and Pipe Music. William Kell was the first Town Clerk of Gateshead, elected 1836 to 1854, and also a pipe-music lover, and collector of music relating to the Northumbrian smallpipes. Bruce was a pillar of society: a headmaster, a Moderator of the Presbyterian Church, a founder of the Y.M.C.A., a workhouse guardian, a respected antiquary, etc., etc., and consequently gave much credence to the committee and its work. He was possibly an influence in the omission of slightly bawdy ballads from the final works.

In 1857, after two years, there was still no book, and the delays caused some embarrassment to members of the committee. The reasons given in the committee's apologies included the fact that they did not want to credit any of the work as "Northumbrian" if it were not. As time went on, Kell (1862) and White (1870) died, and Fenwick moved his law practice to London. In the meantime, John Stokoe had been appointed to the Committee. He had for many years been transcribing and copying out, by hand, many songs, lyrics and/or music, and had collected a large number.

The committee now had numerous other sources to choose from, including Joseph Ritson's Bishopric Garland and Northumberland Garland, John Bell's Rhymes of Northern Bards and Joseph Crawhall II's Tunes for the Northumbrian small Pipes. These then, together with the collected papers of its committee members, were the main sources of Northumbrian Minstrelsy, but works from other similar compilations were considered and used. There appears to have been relatively little collecting in the field.

When John Stokoe joined the team on the committee, the work moved forward. The various sources and manuscripts were sifted, collated and ordered. A final selection was made, enabling publication too occur finally in 1882.

== The publication ==
Northumbrian Minstrelsy is a book of Border ballads, Northumbrian folk songs and Northumbrian pipe music consisting of over 200 pages. It contains 132 song lyrics and over 100 pieces of music, and was published in 1882. It is divided into the two sections; the first song lyrics, the second pipe music where only a handful of pieces have lyrics. There is little in the way of biographies of the writers of the music or lyrics, but some information on the histories of the events and a considerable amount on the history of the music.

The selection however has been made from the point of musical and prose quality rather than the popularity of the (sometimes slightly coarse) songs of the period. In addition several of the songs have been "modified" from the original versions for inclusion in this book.

== Contents ==
Note – The page numbers refer to those in the 1965 reprinted edition, and may differ from the original 100+ year old edition.

Page	Title	Songwriter	Tune	Comments	Notes	Ref
v	Foreword by A L Lloyd					
iii	copy of cover					
iii	Introduction					
iii	comment on	Thomas Doubleday				
iv	comment on			the bag of the bagpipes		
v	comment on			the reed of the bagpipes		
iv	comment on			the drone		
xii	The two Sections					
1	PART I – BALLADS & SONGS					
1	Chevy Chase – (ancient ballad of)			history of and comments on		
1	Chevy Chase – (ancient ballad of)					
3	Chevy Chase – (ancient ballad of) The first Fit		Chevy Chase			
10	Chevy Chase – (modern ballad of)	may be Richard Sheale	Chevy Chase	according to Mr Chappell		
10	a mention of	William Chappell				
17	Battle of Otterburn – (The)		Chevy Chase	a variation on Chevy Chase – about a battle fought 9 August 1388		
25	Bewick and the Graeme, the	Transcribed by Sir Walter Scott		taken from the "Minstrelsy of the Scottish Border" possibly 16th century		
29	comment on			"The Bewick and the Graeme" and chivalry		
31	Brave Earl Brand and the King of England's Daughter – (The)					
33	comment on			The close relationship between the last song and many others		
34	Hughie the Graeme	Graeme Clan				
35	short bio	Joseph Ritson				
36	short bio	Graeme Clan				
37	Jock o' the Syde			first published 1784 in the Hawick Museum, a provincial miscellany, by John Elliott, Esq., of Reidheugh		
41	short bio	Jock o' the Syde		maybe a nephew of the Laird of Mangerton,		
42	Death of Parcy Reed – (The)					
46	short bio	Parcy Reed				
48	Outlandish Knight – (The)					
50	short bio	Outlanders		someone from the Outlands or Debatable Lands		
51	Fair Flower of Northumberland – (The)	Thomas Deloney or T.D.		The English version – there is a Scottish version by Kinlock		
55	short bio	Thomas Deloney or T.D.		alias the "ballading silk weaver" who died c1600		
55	short bio	Kinlock,		A Scottish version of "Fair Flower of Northumberland"		
56	Laidley Worm (The) (of Spindleston Heugh)	(this version by Robert Lamb, Vicar of Norham)	from an old MSS			
60	short bio	Reverend Robert Lambe		Vicar of Norham		
60	comment on			The Worm O Spindleston Heugh		
61	Binnorie, or, the Cruel Sister,			first published as broadsheet by Mr. Rimbault c 1656.		
63	a mention of	Mr. Rimbault printer				
63	comment on			history of Binnorie		
64	Lord Beichan					
69	comment on			versions of "Lord Beichan"		
71	Derwentwater's Farewell					
72	short bio	James Radclyffe, 3rd Earl of Derwentwater				
73	comment on			Derwentwater's Farewell		
74	Derwentwater					
75	comment on			Derwentwater		
76	Lay the Bent to the Bonny Broom					
78	comment on			simple melodies		
79	Whittingham Fair					
81	Blow the Winds, I-ho					
82	Keach I' the Creel – (The)					
84	O I hae seen the Roses blaw					
86	O the Oak and the Ash and the Bonny Ivy Tree		Goddesses *	* The tune is in Sir James Hawkins' "The Dancing Muster," 1650, under this title		
87	comment on			history of song "Oak Ash and Bonny Ivy		
88	Bonny at Morn					
89	Water of Tyne (The)					
90	Willow Tree or Rue ard Thyme – (The)	attributed to Mrs Francis Habergham, of Habergham, Lancashire (died 1703)		according to William Chappell		
90	Rue ard Thyme – (The)	attributed to Mrs Francis Habergham, of Habergham, Lancashire (died 1703)		Alternative title of "Willow Tree"		
91	short bio	William Chappell				
91	comment on			history of "The Willow Tree"		
92	Sair Fail'd, Hinney			Actually titled "Sair Fyel'd, Hinny" in the book		
93	I Drew my Ship into a Harbour					
94	Miller and His Sons – (The)					
95	comment on			The Miller in poetry and satire		
96	Shoemaker – (The)					
97	My Love is Newly Listed			no lyrics – music only – first published when Thomas Doubleday placed it in "Blackwood Magazine" 1821		
97	a mention of	Thomas Doubleday				
97	comment on			history of My Love is newly listed		
98	Broom, Green Broom					
100	O the Bonny Fisher Lad					
102	Hexhamshire Lass – (The)					
104	Mode o' Wooing – (The)					
107	Northumberland Bagpipes – (The)					
108	a mention of	William Chappell				
108	comment on			pipes		
109	Durham Old Women					
110	Aboot the Bush, Willy					
111	Christmas Day in the Morning	Traditional Carol				
112	Elsie Marley	Elsie Marley	to its own tune	An Alewife at Pictree, near Chester-le-Street		
113	short bio	Elsie (or Alice) Marley		first published by Joseph Ritson in "Bishopric Garland" 1784		
113	comment on			short history on "Elsie Marley"		
115	Bobby Shaftoe	Traditional				
116	Up the Raw					
117	Dol Li A					
118	Broom Buzzems – (or Buy Broom Busoms)					
119	short bio	William Purvis				
120	A You A, Hinny Burd			named as "A U Hinny Burd" in this book		
121	Ca' Hawkie through the watter			The title given is "Water" in this book		
122	Anti-Gallican Privateer (The)					
123	comment on			The ship, first to sail fitted and manned from Newcastle		
124	Adam Buckham, O!					
125	Captain Bover					
125	short bio	Thomas Doubleday				
125	short bio	Captain Bover				
126	Here's the Tender coming					
127	Liberty for the Sailors	John Stobbs		a Shields song for the days of the Press-gang	Tune-Br	
128	Sailors are a' at the Bar (The)			Actually titled "The Sailors are all at the Bar" in book		
128	a mention of	John Bell				
128	Lad wi' the Trousers on					
129	Twelve Days of Christmas – (The)					
129	comment on			history of "Twelve Days of Christmas"		
132	Ma' Canny Hinny			Actually titled "Maw Canny Hinny" in this book		
134	Robin Spraggon's Auld Grey Mare			transcribed by Mr Fairless		
135	comment on			days gone by		
136	short bio	Mr. Fairless of Hexham				
137	Sword Dancers' Song – (The)			no lyrics – music only		
137	Kitty Bo-bo,			no lyrics – music only		
138	(Weel May) The Keel Row	Traditional				
139	comment on			history of "The Keel Row"		
140	Northern Minstrel's Budget – (The)	Henry Robson				
143	short bio	Henry Robson				
144	blank					
145	Part II – Small pipe tunes					
	the following tunes are music only except where a comment to the contrary is given.					
145	Chevy Chase – (pipe tune)		Chevy Chase			
145	Coquetside		Coquetside			
146	Wylam Away		Wylam Away	referred to as "Gingling Geordie" in an old ms of 1694		
146	Cockle Geordie		Cockle Geordie			
147	I saw My Love passing by Me		I saw My Love passing by Me	two lines of lyrics discovered		
147	Jockey lay up in the Hay Loft		Jockey lay up in the Hay Loft			
148	Pelton Lonnin'		Pelton Lonnin'	two verses also located, Title actually given as "Felton" but verses say "Pelton"		
148	Kye's Come Home (The)		Pelton Lonnin'	two verses also located		
148	a mention of	Cuthbert Sharp		given as "Pelton Lonin" in "Bishoprick Garland"		
149	Stay a Wee Bit, Bonnie Lad		Stay a Wee Bit, Bonnie Lad			
149	Broken-legged Chicken – (The)		The Broken-legged Chicken			
150	Bonny Pit Laddie – (The)		Bonny Pit Laddie	two verses given		
150	Bonny Keel Laddie – (The)		Bonny Pit Laddie	three verses given		
151	Dorrington Lads		Dorrington Lads			
151	Blackett o' Wylam		Blacket o' Wylam	erroneously spelt "Blacket" in this book		
152	Peacock followed the hen (The)	William Midford	The Peacock followed the Hen	two verses given	Tune-Cr	
152	history of tune			"The Peacock followed the Hen"		
152	Meggy's Foot		Meggy's Foot			
154	Because he was a Bonny Lad		Because he was a Bonny Lad	one chorus given		
154	Fair Maid of Whickham – (The)		Fair Maid of Whickham – (The)			
155	My Dearie Sits Ower Late Up – or My Bonnie Bay Mare and I		My Dearie Sits Ower Late Up	four verses given		
155	history of tune			"My Dearie Sits Ower Late Up"		
156	Newburn Lads		Newburn Lads	also known as "The Braw Lads o' Jethart"		
156	a mention of	Thomas Doubleday				
156	Cut and Dry Dolly		Cut and Dry Dolly			
157	I'll have Her in Spite of Her Minnie		I'll have Her in Spite of Her Minnie			
157	Lads of AInwick – (The)		The Lads of AInwick			
158	Sir John Fenwick's the Flower amang them		Sir John Fenwick's the Flower amang them	"Sir John Fenwick's the Flower amang them"		
158	history of tune					
159	Sir John Fenwick's the Flower amang them (newer lyrics)		Sir John Fenwick's the Flower amang them	one chorus given		
159	Cuddie Clauder		Cuddie Clauder			
160	All the Night I lay awake		All the Night I lay awake			
160	Ail Hands upon Deck		Ail Hands upon Deck			
161	Noble Squire Dacre		Noble Squire Dacre			
161	short bio	The Dacre Family				
162	Go to Berwick, Johnnie		Go to Berwick, Johnnie			
162	Parks o' Yester – (The)		Parks o' Yester – (The)			
163	Wedding o' Blyth – (The) – or Blue's gaen oot o' the Fashion		Wedding o' Blyth			
163	Blue's gaen oot o' the Fashion		Wedding o' Blyth	Alternative title of "The Wedding o' Blyth"		
163	a mention of	Thomas Doubleday		transcribed the tune "Wedding o' Blyth" with one verse		
163	Lousy Cutter – (The)		Wedding o' Blyth	two verses given		
164	Black Cock of Whickham – (The)		The Black Cock of Whickham			
164	Coffee and Tea – or Jamie Allen's Fancy		Coffee and Tea			
164	Jamie Allen's Fancy			Alternative title of "Coffee and Tea"		
164	Jamie Allen's Fancy		Coffee and Tea	alternative name vof "Coffee and Tea"		
165	Keelman Ower Land – (The)		The Keelman Ower Land			
165	Small Coals an' Little Money		Small Coals an' Little Money			
166	Shew's the Way to Wallington		Shew's the Way to Wallington			
166	Shew's the Way to Wallington	Mr Anderson, a miller at Wallington	Shew's the Way to Wallington	5 verses given		
167	short bio	Mr Anderson, a miller at Wallington				
167	Jockey stays lang at the Fair		Jockey stays lang at the Fair			
168	Stagshaw Bank Fair		Stagshaw Bank Fair			
168	We'll all away to Sunniside		We'll all away to Sunniside			
169	Miller's Wife o' Blaydon – (The)		The Miller's Wife o' Blaydon	three verses given		
170	Holey Halfpenny – (The)		The Holey Halfpenny			
170	Hoop Her and Gird Her		Hoop Her and Gird Her			
171	Fenwick o' Bywell		Fenwick o' Bywell	also known as "Newmarket Races" and "Galloping ower the Cow Hill" and similar to Irish air "Garryowen"		
171	history of tune			Fenwick o' Bywell		
172	Drucken Moll Knox		Drucken Moll Knox			
172	Lass and the Money is all my own – (The)		The Lass and the Money is all my own			
173	Canny Hobbie Elliot			or Canny Hobby Elliott		
173	comment on	Thomas Doubleday				
173	comment on	John Bell		named as "Hobby Elliott"		
173	Peacock's March	John Peacock	Peacock's March			
174	Peacock's Tune	John Peacock	Peacock's Tune			
174	short bio	John Peacock				
175	Peacock's Fancy	John Peacock	Peacock's Fancy			
175	Footie	John Peacock	Peacock's Fancy	a mention only		
175	Pipers' Maggot or Fancy		Pipers' Maggot or Fancy			
176	Green Brechans o' Branton		Green Brechans o' Branton			
176	Jackey Layton		Jackey Layton			
177	Till the Tide comes in		Till the Tide comes in			
177	short bio	Cuthbert Sharp				
177	Till the Tide comes in	Henry Robson	Till the Tide comes in			
177	Lamshaw's Fancy		Lamshaw's Fancy			
178	Morpeth Lasses		Morpeth Lasses			
178	Major – (The)		The Major			
179	Andrew Carr		Andrew Carr	two verses given		
179	Follow Her over the Border		Follow Her over the Border			
180	Little Fishie		Little Fishie			
180	Leazes Hopping		Leazes Hopping			
181	Cooper o' Stannerton Heugh – (The)		The Cooper o' Stannerton Heugh			
181	Mile to Ride – (A)		A Mile to Ride	also known as Stannerton (or Stamfordham) Hopping, Stanhope, Weardale and The Fleet's a coming		
181	Stannerton (or Stamfordham) Hopping		A Mile to Ride	alternative name of "A Mile to Ride"		
181	Stanhope		A Mile to Ride	alternative name of "A Mile to Ride"		
181	Weardale		A Mile to Ride	alternative name of "A Mile to Ride"		
181	Fleet's a coming – (The)		A Mile to Ride	alternative name of "A Mile to Ride"		
182	Sandhill Corner		Sandhill Corner			
182	Lang stay'd away		Lang stay'd away			
183	Blaw the Wind southerly		Blaw the Wind southerly	one verse given – usually spelt as "Blow the Wind Southerly"		
183	comment on	Cuthbert Sharp				
183	history of tune			Blaw the Wind southerly		
183	Cuckold come out o' the Amrey		Cuckold come out o' the Amrey			
184	Ower the Border		Ower the Border			
184	Sunderland Lasses		Sunderland Lasses			
185	New Highland Laddie		New Highland Laddie			
186	Little wot ye wha's coming		Little wot ye wha's coming			
186	history of tune					
186	Little wot ye wha's coming		Little wot ye wha's coming	a mention of Scottish version listing clans		
186	Little wot ye wha's coming		Little wot ye wha's coming	a mention of English version with two lines preserved		
187	Fairly shot of Her					
188	Black and the Grey – (The)		Black and the Grey – (The)			
189	Rantin' Roarin' Willie – or Mitford Galloway – (The)		Rantin' Roarin' Willie – or Mitford Galloway – (The)			
189	Mitford Galloway (The)			alternative name of "Rantin' Roarin' Willie"		
189	history of tune					
189	Mitford Galloway (The)	Thomas Whittle	Rantin' Roarin' Willie – or Mitford Galloway – (The)			
189	short bio	Thomas Whittle				
190	Hen's March – (The)					
191	Blanchland Races					
191	FINIS					
193	Index					

=== Notes ===
- Tune-Br -The tune is not given in the book – but it has been added as attributed in Brockie's The Shields Garland
- Tune-Cr -The tune is not given in the book – but it has been added as attributed in Joseph Crawhall's A Beuk o' Newcassel Sangs, 1888

== See also ==
- Allan's Illustrated Edition of Tyneside Songs and Readings
- A Beuk o’ Newcassell Sangs Collected by Joseph Crawhall 1888
- Rhymes of Northern Bards
- Music of Northumbria
