= Newcastle University Library =

Library service at Newcastle University, UK

Coordinates: 54.981°N 1.6113°W

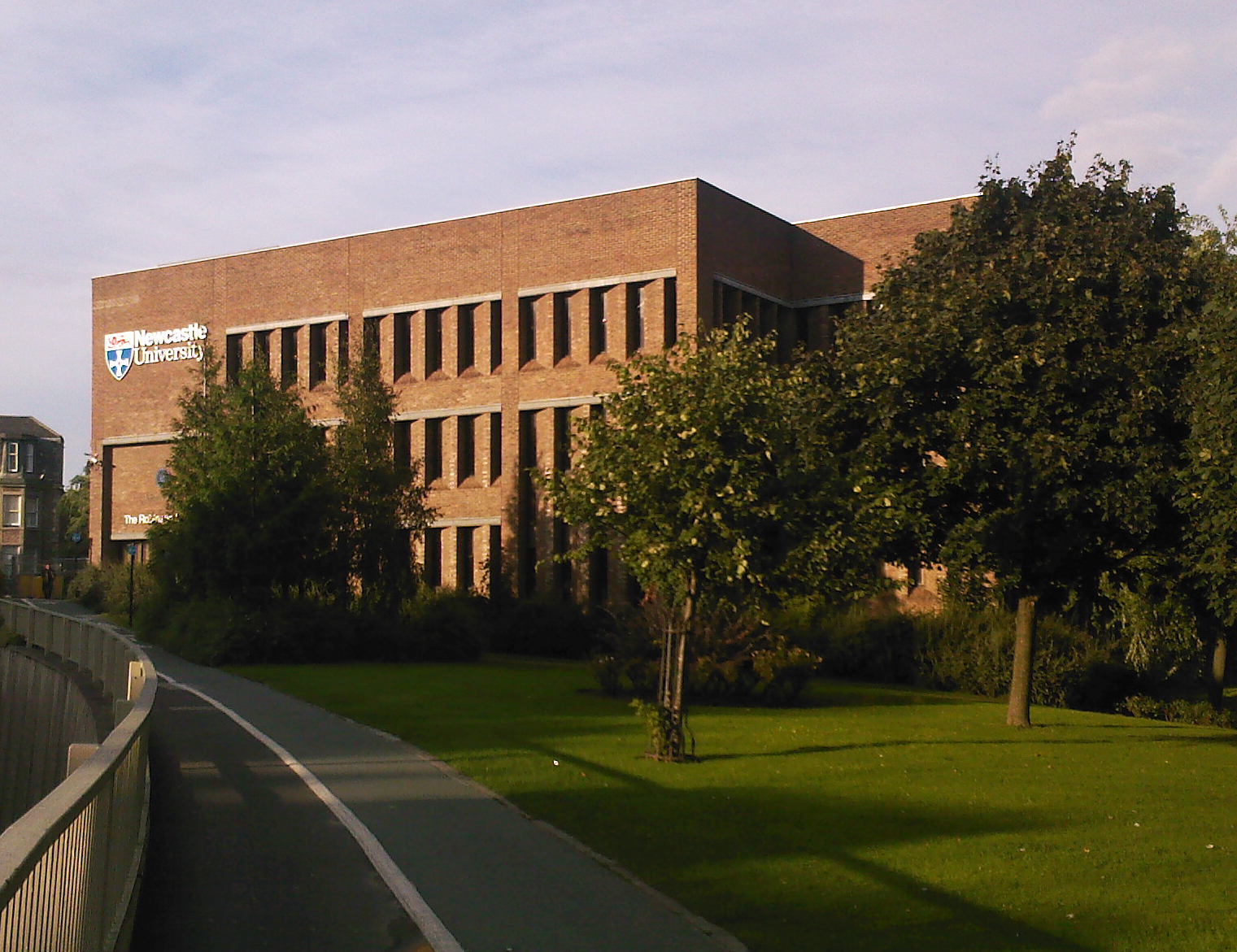
- The Philip Robinson Library, part of the University Library
- Location: Newcastle upon Tyne, England, United Kingdom
- Type: University Library
- Established: 1871
- Branches: 4

Collection
- Items collected: Books, journals, newspapers, magazines, sound and music recordings, patents, databases, maps, Parliamentary papers, drawings and manuscripts
- Size: >1,000,000 books, 26,000 periodicals

Access and use
- Access requirements: Open to all students of Newcastle, Durham, Northumbria, Sunderland and Teesside Universities. Students from universities within the SCONUL Vacation Access Scheme. NHS Staff (Northern Region). Certain external borrowers, alumni and fee-payers.

Other information
- Director: Jill Taylor-Roe (Director of Academic Services and University Librarian, Keeper of the Pybus Collection)
- Website: ncl.ac.uk/library

Newcastle University Library is the library service for students and staff at Newcastle University, UK. It consists of:

- The Philip Robinson Library, the main library, offers collections in arts, humanities, social sciences, science and engineering, agriculture, education, psychology.
- The Walton Library, situated in the Medical School, provides resources in medicine, dentistry and biomedical sciences.
- The Law Library, situated in the Law School, provides extensive law resources.
- The Marjorie Robinson Library Rooms provide a mix of individual and collaborative study spaces.

It is the only library in the United Kingdom to receive the Charter Mark award for excellence five times in a row. It has since been awarded the Customer Service Excellence Award twice.

The University Library has won The Times Higher Leadership and Management Award for the Outstanding Library Team.

== History ==
The library of Armstrong College, the precursor to Newcastle University, was on the third floor of what is now the Armstrong Building, before moving to a larger room on the first floor in 1906. In 1926 the library moved into a new building on the other side of the quadrangle, which also housed the libraries of the Royal Victoria Infirmary and the Medical College which eventually merged with Armstrong College.

A substantial extension to this building in 1960 was quickly outgrown by the library, which from 1963 served the new University of Newcastle upon Tyne. In 1982 a new library building opened on Jesmond Road West, occupying ground cleared during the construction of the Newcastle Central Motorway in the early 1970s. It was named the Robinson Library in 1989 and renamed the Philip Robinson Library in 2016. The building was extended in 1996 to provide additional study space and a large computer cluster.

In 2014 a Pop-Up Library was launched in the King's Road Centre to provided additional study space during the summer exam period, and the Pop-Up Library returned during exam periods until the opening of the Marjorie Robinson Library Rooms in January 2016.

== Philip Robinson Library ==
The Philip Robinson Library is the main library for Newcastle University, and is located on Jesmond Road West. It was named after Philip Robinson, a bookseller in the city and benefactor to the library, in 1989. The subsequent £8 million bequest in the will of his widow Marjorie remains the largest sum donated to a UK university library. The library was initially known simply as the Robinson Library until 2016, when it was renamed as the Philip Robinson Library to distinguish it from the new Marjorie Robinson Library Rooms.

The library allows students and members to access a wide variety of material, including:

- Special Collections: spanning from the mid-15th century to the 21st century, the special collection includes over one hundred rare books, manuscripts, illustrations and woodblocks.
- E-Journals and databases: access to electronic journals and databases allowing students to access research papers and journals from a large number of sources.
- Books and papers: over one million books and twenty six thousand periodicals are available, and access is given to Parliamentary papers and journal collection.
- Computer access: the Philip Robinson Library has four computer clusters available with over two hundred computers.

The Philip Robinson Library had a large refurbishment which was completed in 2009. Another refurbishment followed in 2012. The Philip Robinson Library also has its own computer cluster, as well as an open working space for students, named "Your Space". All four floors provide computers and study spaces, with the top two floors offering designated 'quiet' and 'silent' spaces. There is also a printing and bindery office for both commercial and student use.

In 2018 the Special Collections service housed in the library was awarded Archive Service Accreditation.

== Walton Library ==
The Walton Library, located in the Medical School on Framlington Place, specialises in texts and resources relating to biomedical sciences, although students of any discipline are allowed to use it for study. It is named after Lord Walton of Detchant, former Dean of the Faculty of Medicine and Professor of Neurology. The library has a relationship with the Northern region of the NHS allowing their staff to use the library for research and study. In addition to book loans and computer access, the Walton Library also has a number or workstations connected for NHS users to access databases and journals.

== Law Library ==
Located in Newcastle Law School on Windsor Terrace, the Law Library specialises in providing texts for law students, although students from all disciplines may use it. Specialised student text collections exist for books that are heavily in demand, and a computer cluster is also available.

== Marjorie Robinson Library Rooms ==
A digital library, the Marjorie Robinson Library Rooms houses a variety of digital learning spaces, including over 550 study spaces, 220 desktop PCs and space for group study.

It is located on Sandyford Road. Marjorie Robinson was the wife of Philip Robinson, who gives his name to the main library. She died in 1998 and left £8 million to the library in her will. The library opened in a former office building in January 2016 and underwent further renovations in 2017–18. From 2015 to 2017 the top two floors housed Open Lab, a research group at the university.
