= Joseph Ritson =

English antiquarian and writer (1752–1803)

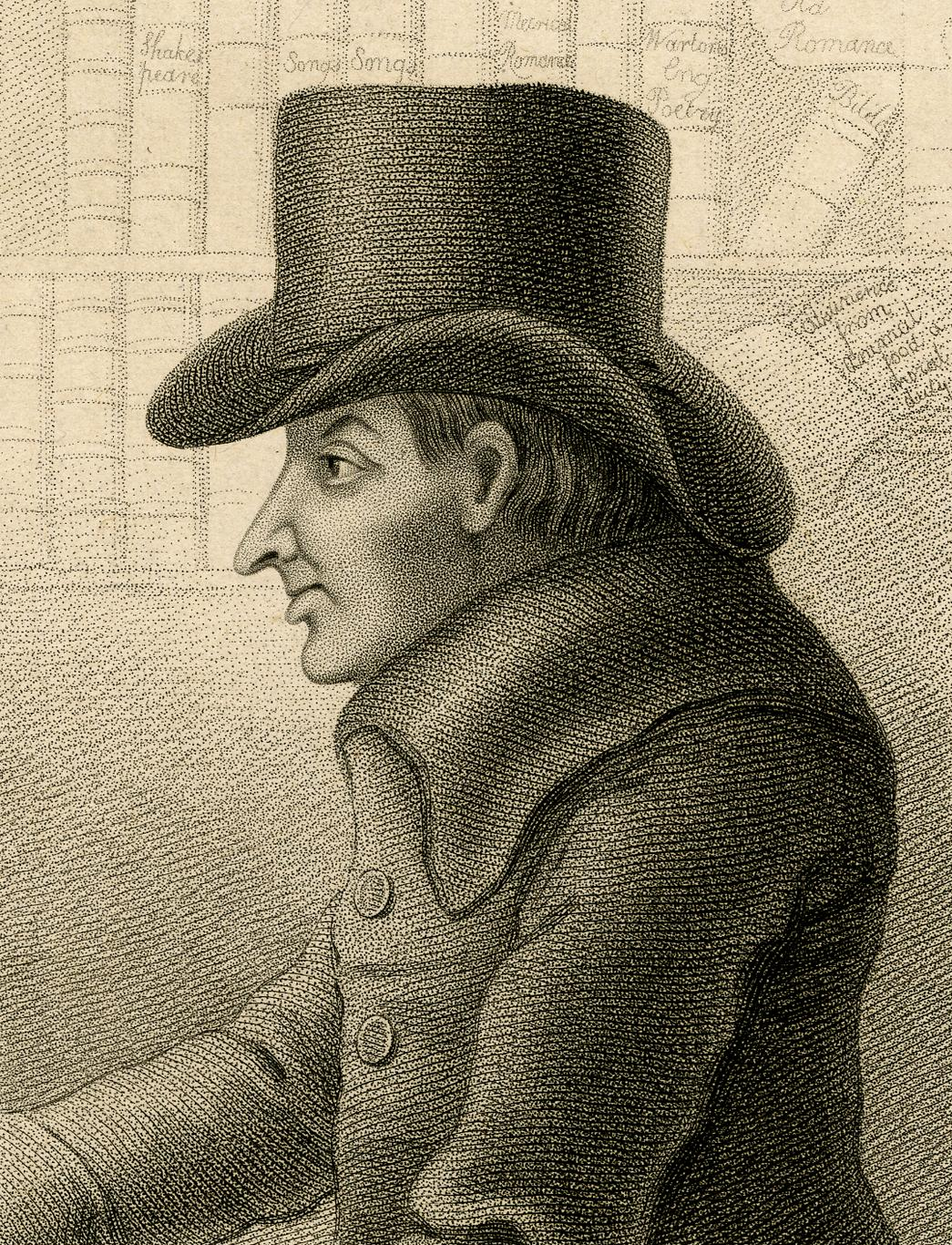
- Engraving of Ritson by James Sayers
- Born: 2 October 1752; Stockton-on-Tees, England
- Died: 23 September 1803 (aged 50); Hoxton, London, England
- Occupations: Antiquarian, writer

Joseph Ritson (2 October 1752 – 23 September 1803) was an English antiquary known for editing the first scholarly collection of Robin Hood ballads (1795). After a visit to France in 1791, he became a staunch supporter of the ideals of the French Revolution. He was also an influential vegetarianism activist. Ritson is also known for his collections of English nursery rhymes, such as "Roses Are Red" and "Little Bo-Peep", in Gammer Gurton's Garland or The Nursery Parnassus, published in London by Joseph Johnson.

== Life and work ==
=== Early life ===
Ritson was born in Stockton-on-Tees, County Durham, of a Westmorland yeoman family. He was educated for the law, mainly by Ralph Bradley the leading conveyancer. He then settled in London as a conveyancer at 22.

=== Writing career ===
Ritson devoted his spare time to literature, and in 1782, he published an attack on Thomas Warton's History of English Poetry. The tone of his Observations, in which Warton was treated as a pretender, charged with cheating and lying to cover his ignorance, caused a sensation in literary circles.

In nearly all the small points with which he dealt, Ritson was in the right, and his corrections have since been adopted, but the unjustly bitter language of his criticisms roused great anger at the time, much, it would appear, to Ritson's delight. In 1783 Samuel Johnson and George Steevens were attacked in the same bitter fashion as Warton for their text of Shakespeare. Bishop Percy was next subjected to a furious onslaught in the preface to a collection of Ancient Songs (printed 1787, dated 1790, published 1792). In a letter (14 March 1803) to Samuel Taylor Coleridge, Robert Southey wrote that "Ritson is the oddest, but most honest of all our antiquarians, and he abuses Percy and Pinkerton with less mercy than justice".

Ritson usually spared no pains himself to ensure accuracy in the texts of old songs, ballads and metrical romances which he edited. His collection of the Robin Hood ballads is perhaps his greatest single achievement. However, unlike the other works he edited, he gave in to his own political prejudices as a Jacobin when he included the idea, uncommon until then, that Robin Hood robbed the rich and gave to the poor rather than simply robbing the bishops and the Sheriff of Nottingham. When Ritson was asked who gave Robin Hood a commission to rob from the rich and give to the poor, he replied "That same power which authorises kings to take it where it can be worst spared, and give it where it is least wanted."

Ritson's 1783 collection of nursery rhymes, Gammer Gurton's Garland, was partly compiled for his seven-year-old nephew, Frank Joseph. Ritson had previously recommended the widely popular Mother Goose's Melodies (c. 1760s) to the child, describing it as "an excellent thing" and encouraging him to "write verses on the model of Mother Goose" - a source from which his own collection drew extensively. The anthology, and Ritson's work at large, reflected what biographer Henry Alfred Burd observed as the editor's "commendable desire to inoculate sound morality in the hearts of youth."

Sir Walter Scott, who admired his industry and accuracy in spite of his temper, was almost the only man who could get on with him. According to Scott, Ritson was "a man of acute observation, profound research, and great labour". He features as 'the potato philosopher' in John Paterson's Mare, James Hogg's allegorical satire on the Edinburgh publishing scene first published in the Newcastle Magazine in 1825.

Spelling became one of his eccentricities; in his later books, he increasingly adopted a reformed spelling of his own devising. As early as 1796, Ritson showed signs of mental collapse, and on 10 September 1803, he became completely insane, barricaded himself in his chambers at Gray's Inn, made a bonfire of manuscripts, and was finally forcibly removed to Hoxton, where he died.

Ritson was an atheist.

=== Vegetarianism ===
Ritson was an early vegetarianism activist. He became a vegetarian in 1772 after reading Bernard Mandeville's The Fable of the Bees and adopted a diet that was based on vegetables and milk. His ideas were criticised in his day, but were influential to many vegetarians who came after him. Ritson has been described as a pioneer of animal rights.

In 1802, his An Essay on Abstinence from Animal Food, as a Moral Duty, was published by Sir Richard Phillips. The book utilised health and moral arguments for abstaining from animal foods. Biographer Bertrand Harris Bronson has noted that based on excerpts from Ritson's daily journal his vegetarian diet consisted of muffins, cake, cheese, bread, butter, milk, beer and ale.

== Bibliography ==
- Verses addressed to the Ladies of Stockton. First printed in the Newcastle Miscellany, MDCCLXXII, 1780
- Observations on the three first volumes of the history of English poetry by T. W. in a letter to the author, by Thomas Warton and Joseph Ritson, 1782
- A Select Collection of English Songs, 1783
- Gammer Gurton's Garland, or, The nursery Parnassus: a choice collection of pretty songs and verses for the amusement of all little good children who can neither read nor run, 1784
- The Spartan Manual, or Tablet of Morality, being a genuine collection of the apophthegms, maxims and precepts of the philosophers ... and other ... celebrated characters of antiquity, etc, 1785
- A Digest of the proceedings of the Court Leet of the Manor and Liberty of the Savoy, 1789
- Pieces of Ancient Popular Poetry: From Authentic Manuscripts and Old Printed Copies, 1791, (Kessinger Publishing, 2007) ISBN 0-548-60052-X
- The Office of Constable: being an entirely new compendium of the law concerning that ancient minister for the conservation of the peace, etc, 1791
- Cursory criticisms on the edition of Shakespeare published by Edmond Malone, 1792
- The Northumberland Garland; or, Newcastle Nightingale: a matchless collection of famous songs. Edited by Joseph Ritson, 1793
- Law-Tracts. L.P, 1794
- Poems on interesting events in the reign of Edward III. written in the year MCCCLII. ... With a preface, dissertations, notes, and a glossary by J. Ritson, by Laurence Minot and Joseph Ritson (editor), 1795
- Ancient Songs and Ballads from the Reign of King Henry the Second to the Revolution in Two Volumes, (BiblioBazaar, 2009) ISBN 1-103-18694-9
- Bibliographia poetica: a catalogue of Engleish sic poets, of the twelfth, thirteenth, fourteenth, fifteenth, and sixteenth, centurys, with a short account of their works, by Joseph Ritson, Philip Bliss, James Boswell, and John Payne Collier, 1802
- Ancient Engleish Metrical Romanceës, 1802, (Kessinger Publishing, 2009) ISBN 1-104-02459-4
- An Essay on Abstinence from Animal Food, as a Moral Duty, edited by Sir Richard Philips, London, 1802, (Kessinger Publishing, 2009) ISBN 1-4367-7108-0
- A catalogue of the entire and curious library and manuscripts of the late Joseph Ritson, 1803
- The jurisdiction of the Court leet: Exemplified in the articles which the jury or inquest for the King, in that court, is charged and sworn, and by law enjoined, to inquire of and present, W. Clarke and Sons; 2d ed, with great additions, edition 1809
- Northern Garlands, R. Triphook, 1810
- The Office of Bailiff of a Liberty, 1811
- A Select Collection of English Songs, with Their Original Airs: and a Historical Essay on the Origin and Progress of National Song, London, 1813, (Adamant Media Corporation, 2005) ISBN 1-4212-6009-3
- The Caledonian Muse: A Chronological Selection of Scottish Poetry from the Earliest Times, 1821, (Kessinger Publishing, 2007) ISBN 0-548-73946-3
- Some account of the life and publications of the late Joseph Ritson, esq, by Joseph Haslewood, 1824
- Life of King Arthur from Ancient Historians and Authentic Documents, London, 1825, (Kessinger Publishing, 2003) ISBN 0-7661-8100-6
- Annals of the Caledonians, Picts, and Scots and of Strathclyde, Cumberland, Galloway and Murray, London, 1828, (BiblioBazaar, 2008) ISBN 0-554-48196-0
- Memoirs of The Celts or Gauls, Joseph Ritson and Joseph Frank, 1829, (BiblioBazaar, 2009) ISBN 1-103-37230-0
- Letters from Joseph Ritson to George Paton, 1829, (Kessinger Publishing, 2008) ISBN 1-4370-2591-9
- Fairy Tales, Now First Collected: To which are prefixed two dissertations: 1. On Pygmies. 2. On Fairies, London, 1831, (Adamant Media Corporation, 2004) ISBN 1-4021-4753-8
- Robin Hood: A Collection of All the Ancient Poems, Songs, and Ballads, Now Extant Relative to That Celebrated English Outlaw: To Which are Prefixed Historical Anecdotes of His Life, London, 1832, (Adamant Media Corporation, 2004) ISBN 1-4212-6209-6
- The Letters of Joseph Ritson edited chiefly from originals in the possession of his nephew J. Frank. To which is prefixed a memoir of the author, by Joseph Ritson, Joseph Frank, and Nicholas Harris Nicolas, 1833, (Kessinger Publishing, 2007) ISBN 0-548-72425-3
- Gammer Gurton's Garland or the Nursery Parnassus: A Choice Collection of Pretty Songs and Verses, 1866, (Kessinger Publishing, 2007) ISBN 0-548-69412-5
- Scotish Songs (sic), 1869, (Kessinger Publishing, 2008) ISBN 1-4371-0663-3
- Fairy Tales, Legends & Romances Illustrating Shakespeare & Other Early English Writers, 1875, (Kessinger Publishing, 2003) ISBN 0-7661-4981-1
- The Boy Knight; or, Kindness Rewarded, James B. Knapp, 1877
- Ancient Popular Poetry V1: From Authentic Manuscripts and Old Printed Copies, by Joseph Ritson and Edmund Goldsmid, 1884, (Kessinger Publishing, 2009) ISBN 1-104-01763-6
- Ancient English metrical romances, E. & G. Goldsmid, 1884
- Northern Garlands: A Collection of Songs, 1887
- A dissertation on romance and minstrelsy: To which is appended the ancient metrical romance of Ywaine and Gawin, 1891, (Kessinger Publishing, 2007) ISBN 0-548-78222-9
- Joseph Ritson: A Critical Biography, by Henry A. Burd, Illinois, 1916, (BiblioBazaar, 2008) ISBN 0-554-58449-2
- Joseph Ritson, scholar-at-arms. With plates, including portraits, and a bibliography, by Bertrand Harris Bronson, 1938

== See also ==
- Ritson's Northern Garlands 1810
- Ritson's Bishopric Garland or Durham Minstrel 1792
- Ritson's Yorkshire Garland 1809
- Ritson's Northumberland Garland or Newcastle Nightingale 1809
- Ritson's North-Country Chorister 1809
