= John Collingwood Bruce =

British nonconformist minister, historian and author (1805–1892)

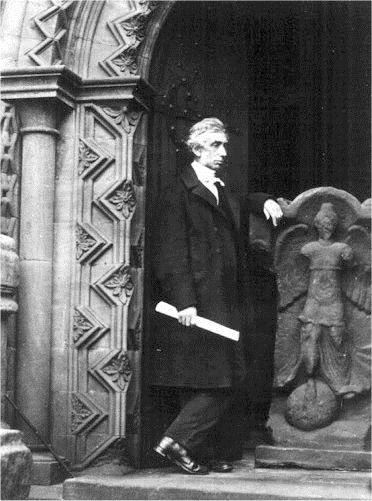
John Collingwood Bruce

The Reverend John Collingwood Bruce, FSA (1805 – 5 April 1892) was an English nonconformist minister and schoolmaster, known as a historian of Tyneside and author. He co-operated with John Stokoe in compiling the major song collection Northumbrian Minstrelsy published in 1882

== Early life ==
The eldest son of John Bruce of Newcastle, he was educated at the Percy Street Academy, a well-known school in Newcastle kept by his father, and afterwards at Mill Hill School, Middlesex. He entered Glasgow University in 1821, graduated M.A. in 1826, and became hon. LL.D. in 1853.

In early life, Bruce studied for the Presbyterian ministry, but never sought a call from any congregation. In 1831, he began to assist in the management of his father's school, of which he became sole proprietor in 1834, when his father died. He retired from the school, after a successful career, in 1863.

== Historical interests ==
Bruce's main interest was in the history of Britain, in particular North East England and more specifically Roman Britain and Hadrian's Wall. His books used a numbering system for the structures of the Wall, and by about 1930 it had become standard, using the milecastle located to the east. Examples are T33a or Turret 26B (Brunton). His interest in music was largely historical, and in editing the Northumbrian Minstrelsy he co-operated with John Stokoe.

The article Music of Northumbria credits Stokoe with copying out, in 1850, some of the tunes from John Smith's tunebook of 1750, a book now long lost, and the pair creating this comprehensive collection of old Northern Songs. The work was on behalf of, and published by, the Ancient Melodies Committee of the Society of Antiquaries of Newcastle upon Tyne, of which Bruce was an active committee member.

Bruce gave the Rhind Lectures in 1883, on the Roman occupation of Britain.

== Family ==
His father, also John, had been a schoolteacher for over 40 years, first in Alnwick, then in Newcastle. He was an author and had written books, including a work on Geography. He died at his home in Percy Street, Newcastle on 31 October 1834 aged 60 years.

Bruce married in 1833 Charlotte, daughter of T. Gainsford of Gerrard's Cross, Buckinghamshire, and had two sons and two daughters. The eldest son. Sir Gainsford Bruce, became one of the judges of the High Court of Justice.

John Collingwood Bruce died on 5 April 1892; his wife Charlotte died in 1893, and their daughter Frances died aged 18 months on 17 December 1839. They are buried in the family grave in Jesmond Old Cemetery. A sculptured marble sarcophagus within St Nicholas' Cathedral shows the carved body of J. C. Bruce lying with his feet on a copy of his book Hadrian's Wall.

== Selected works ==
=== Music ===
- Northumbrian Minstrelsy. A collection of Ballads, Melodies and Small Pipe Tunes of Northumbria (206 pages) – edited by John Collingwood Bruce and John Stokoe – published 1882.

The article Music of Northumbria, credits John Stokoe with copying out, in 1850, some of the tunes from John Smith's tunebook of 1750, a book now long lost, and, together with John Collingwood Bruce, creating this comprehensive collection of old Northern Songs. The work was on behalf of, and published by, the Ancient Melodies Committee of the Society of Antiquaries of Newcastle upon Tyne.

=== Historical ===
- A History of Northumberland: in three parts., 1858, John Hodgson, John Hodgson-Hinde, John Collingwood Bruce, Society of Antiquaries of Newcastle upon Tyne
- A Handbook to Newcastle upon Tyne (286 pages), 1863
- The Hand-Book of English History, consisting of an epitome of the annals of the Nation and a series of questions upon each period – Third edition Brought down to the Present Period 1857
- Newcastle upon Tyne Royal Mining, Engineering, and Industrial Exhibition, Jubilee Year, 1887. the Bridges and the Floods of Newcastle upon Tyne (42 pages), 1887
- A Guide To The Castle Of Newcastle upon Tyne: Illustrated With Plans, Sections, And Numerous Engravings On Wood (64 pages), 1847
- The Bayeux Tapestry Elucidated (204 pages)
- Bruce, John Collingwood (1885). Handbook To The Roman Wall: A Guide To Tourists Traversing The Barrier Of The Lower Isthmus (3rd ed.). London: Longman, Green, & Co.
- The Roman wall: a historical, topographical, and descriptive account of the barrier of the lower isthmus, extending from the Tyne to the Solway, deduced from numerous personal surveys, 1851
- Handbook to the Roman Wall: With the Cumbrian Coast and Outpost Forts (355 pages), 2nd Ed. 1853
- The Roman Wall, a Description of the Mural Barrier of the North of England (502 pages)
- Lectures on Old Newcastle, (101 pages), 1904
- The Life and Letters of John Collingwood Bruce (454 pages) – authors John Collingwood Bruce, Gainsford Bruce, 1905

=== Papers and magazine articles ===
- “Hadrian, the Builder of the Roman Wall” – a paper read at the monthly meeting of the Society of Antiquaries, Newcastle upon Tyne, 4. Aug. 1852 (apparently 748 pages in written form)
- “The Wall of Hadrian, with Especial Reference to Recent Discoveries” (76 pages) – two lectures in 1874
- “Notice of a Stone, bearing a Rinnan Inscription, built into a Staircase in Jedburgh Abbey” in magazine 1885
