= John Bell (folk music) =

John Bell (c. 1783–1864) was a printer and avid collector of ballads who played a major part in the recording of the lyrics of popular songs in the north east of England.

== Life and death ==
Bell was born in about 1783, it is thought in Newcastle, and was a printer, sometime surveyor, collector (or probably more correctly, an obsessive hoarder) of anything and everything, but particularly to do with the music that was popular at the time.

Bell followed the precedent set by Joseph Ritson, an eminent and eccentric scholar from Stockton, was probably one of (if not the) first to set down some of the local dialect songs popular in the day. He published a series of “Northern Garlands” in 1793 which contained among others “The Collier's Rant”, “The Keel Row”, “Bobby Shaftoe” and “Elsie Marle.” Bell followed close behind, but adopted a more organised and professional approach.

His many sources ranged from the rich and famous down to the characters of the Newcastle Quayside. His book “Rhymes of Northern Bards” was published in 1812. It included “Bobby Shaftoe”, “Buy Broom Besoms”, “Water of Tyne”, “Dollia”, but with very few mining themed songs except “The Collier's Pay Week", ”Footy Agin the Wall” and “Byker Hill”. There appears to be no logic or method behind the selection of the lyrics, except that they were all local dialect, as it covers a wide range of topics including politics, history, crimes, local characters, work and pleasure. Bell had added notes which two hundred years later are historically very interesting and important.

Bell died in 1864.

== Rhymes of Northern Bards ==
The front cover of the book was as thus :-

Rhymes
Of
Northern Bards:
being a curious
Collection
of old and new
Songs And Poems,
Peculiar to the Counties of
Newcastle upon Tyne,
Northumberland, & Durham.

Edited by John Bell, Jun.

“Northumbria’s sons stand forth, by all confest
“The first and firmest of fair freedom’s train;
“Each brave Northumbrian Nurses in his breast
“The sacred spoark, unsullied by a stain.”

Newcastle upon Tyne: (printed in an old English style)
Printed for John Bell, by M. Angus & Son, and sold by them,
and other Booksellers in Town.

MDCCCXII

== Legacy ==
John Bell's part in local history is secure due to the vast amount of material from books, broadsheets, chap books and notated songs he published. His company eventually went bankrupt in 1856 and the collection was split, although many items went to another collector, Robert White, and some have ended up in the collection of Newcastle University.

In 1813, acting on an idea put forward by Bell, the Newcastle Society of Antiquaries was founded. It held its first meeting at the Turks's Head, believed to have been located in the large listed building in Grey Street.

== See also ==
- Geordie dialect words
- Rhymes of Northern Bards
