= John Stokoe =

English author, antiquarian

John Stokoe was a 19th-century Tyneside (and maybe South Shields) author and historian. He co-operated with the author John Collingwood Bruce in compiling the hugely important “Northumbrian Minstrelsy” published in 1882.

== Details ==
Stokoe lived is South Shields (according to edition of “The North-Country Garland of Song” appearing in the Monthly Chronicle of January 1891. In editing the “Northumbrian Minstralry” he co-operated with fellow author John Collingwood Bruce. The article Music of Northumbria, credits John Stokoe with copying out, in 1950, some of the tunes from John Smith’s tunebook of 1750, a book now long lost, and the pair creating this comprehensive collection of old Northern Songs. The work was on behalf of, and published by, Newcastle Society of Antiquaries.

According to Thomas Allan in his Illustrated Edition of Tyneside Songs and Readings (page1), “(Weel May) The Keel Row”, described by many as the Tyneside National Anthem, was a popular local melody long before 1760 and is long associated with the area covered by the medieval English kingdom of Northumbria and Tyneside, and it was not originally Scottish words to a Scottish tune, as several people had been claiming.

In the same book on page 54, Thomas Allan quotes Stokoe from "The North-Country Garland of Song” giving details of William Purvis (Blind Willie). He gives details oh Blind Willie’s father, baptism, life, and music, and goes on to say that although many people have attributed the melody of Broom Buzzems to Blind Willie, there is no evidence of this other than the singer’s partiality for it.

== Works ==
These include :-

- “Northumbrian Minstrelsy. A collection of Ballads, Melodies and Small Pipe Tunes of Northumbria” (206 pages) – edited by John Collingwood Bruce and John Stokoe - published 1882.

The article Music of Northumbria, credits John Stokoe with copying out, in 1950, some of the tunes from John Smith’s tunebook of 1750, a book now long lost, and, together with John Collingwood Bruce, creating this comprehensive collection of old Northern Songs. The work was on behalf of, and published by, the Ancient Melodies Committee of the Newcastle Society of Antiquaries.

- “Northumbrian Minstrelsy. A Collection of Bag-Pipe Tunes, chiefly of the Olden Time, adapted to the Northumberland Small-Pipes” - edited by John Stokoe – c1882 by Society of Antiquaries
- “Songs and Ballads of Northern England” (216 pages) – by John Stokoe – published 1893
- “The North-Country Garland of Song” was written and provided by John Stockoe. It was a monthly item giving details of the history behind a song or songs and any event which inspired them, the songwriter etc. It was also within the monthly edition of “The monthly Chronicle of North-Country Lore and Legend”, printed and published by the Proprietors of the Newcastle Weekly Chronicle, Newcastle upon Tyne (and 24 Warwick Lane, Paternoster Row, London), and edited by Walter Scott. It was in existence c1890 but only for a relatively short period.

== See also ==
- Geordie dialect words
- Northumbrian Minstrelsy by Bruce and Stokoe, 1882
- John Collingwood Bruce
