= A Beuk o' Newcassell Sangs =

Book by Joseph Crawhall II

- Author: Joseph Crawhall II
- Language: English (Geordie dialect)
- Genre: Chapbook
- Publisher: Mawson, Swan & Morgan
- Publication date: 1888
- Publication place: United Kingdom
- Media type: Print
- Pages: approximately 35 songs with lyrics and some music

A Beuk o' Newcassell Sangs is a pictorial book giving details of local songs, including the lyrics and in many cases, the music, and all beautifully illustrated with the author's own woodcuts. It was published in 1888. It was reprinted in 1965 by Harold Hill, Newcastle upon Tyne.

== Details ==
A Beuk o' Newcassell Sangs – (full title – A Beuk o' Newcassell Sangs Collected by Joseph Crawhall Newcastle-on-Tyne, Mawson, Swan & Morgan, M.D. CCC.LXXXVIII) is a book containing approximately 35 songs complete with their lyrics, and in some cases, the music.

The Geordie folk songs all relate in some way or other to North East England, and many are in Geordie dialect. It was edited by Joseph Crawhall II.

== The publication ==
It is, as the title suggests, a collection of sangs (or in English "songs") from the Newcassel (or "Newcastle") area.

== Contents ==
Are as below:

page	title	songwriter	tune	comments	Notes	Ref
	A You A, Hinny Burd			actually entitled "A.U. Hinny Burd" in this book		
	Amphitrite – (The)	Robert Gilchrist	Gee-ho! Dobbin, popularly known as "Cappy	Aboot the Bush, Willy – is an alternate name given		
	Andrew Carr			actually entitled "Andrew Carr or Kerr" in this book		
	Aw Wish yor Muther wad Cum – or Wor Geordy's notions aboot men nursin' bairns	Joseph Wilson	The Whusslin Thief	actually entitled "Aw Wish thy Muther wad cum" in this book		
	Blackett o' Wylam					
	Bobby Shaftoe	traditional				
	Bonny Pit Laddie (The)			actually entitled "Bonnie pit laddie (The)" in this book		
	Broom Buzzems – (or Buy Broom Busoms)	William Purvis (Blind Willie)		actually entitled "Buy Broom Buzzems" in this book		
	Canny Newcassel	T Thompson				
	Cappy – or The Pitman's Dog	Wm Midford	Gee-ho! Dobbin, popularly known as "Cappy	actually entitled "Cappy’s the Dog" in this book		
	Collier's Rant (The)					
	Cuddle me, Cuddy – or The Peacock followed the Hen					
	Geordy, haud the bairn	Joe Wilson		actually entitled "Cum, Geordie, haud the Bairn" in this book		
	Fenwick o' Bywell					
	Fiery Clock-fyece (The)	Robert Nunn	The Coal-hole			
	Floatin' Gunstan – (The)	William Armstrong	Derry Down	actually entitled "Floatin' Grunstane (The)" in this book		
	Holiday Gown (The)	John Cunningham				
	Hydrophobie – or The Skipper and the Quaker	Robert Emery	The Cameronian's Rant – or X. Y. Z.			
	Jenny Hoolet (The) – or Lizzie Mudie's Ghost	Armstrong	Gee-ho! Dobbin, popularly known as "Cappy	usually called "The Jenny Howlet"		
	(Weel May) The Keel Row	Traditional				
	Keelman's Reasons for Attending Church – (The)	Robert Nunn	Jimmy Johnson's Wherry		A-N1	
	Little Pee-dee (The)		The Irish Drops o' Brandy			
	My Lord 'Size – or Newcastle in an Uproar	John Shield	Newcassel in an Uproar			
	My Love is Newly Listed					
	Newcastle Beer	John Cunningham	Hunting the Hare	actually entitled "Newcassel Beer" in this book		
	Peacock followed the hen (The)	Wm Midford	The Night before Larry was stretch’d – or The Irish drops o' Brandy			
	Sailors are a' at the Bar (The)					
	Sair Fail'd Hinny			actually entitled "Sair fyel’d Hinny" in this book		
	Sandgate Lass's Lamentation (The)		The Manchester Angel	actually entitled "Sandage Lass's Lament" in this book		
	Spottee (a Sunderland song)	possibly the late Thomas Clerke		actually entitled "Spottie" in this book	S-C1	
	Tyne Exile's Lament (The)		Banks o the Dee			
	Up the Raw					
	Use and abuse (The) – or the Pitman and the preacher	J P Robson	Canny Newcassel			
	Water of Tyne (The)			actually entitled "Water o' Tyne" in this book		
	Washing-Day – (The)	Thomas Wilson	There's nae luck aboot the hoose	actually entitled "Weshin'-day (The)" in this book		

== Notes ==
A-N1 – according to George Allan's Tyneside Songs and Readings of 1891, the writer is Robert Nunn

S-C1 – according to (Sir) Cuthbert Sharp's Bishoprick Garland of 1834, the writer is Thomas Clerke

== See also ==
- Geordie dialect words
- Joseph Crawhall II
- Northumbrian Minstrelsy
- Allan's Illustrated Edition of Tyneside Songs and Readings
- Rhymes of Northern Bards
