= George Maddison (British politician) =

British politician

George Maddison (died 1783) was a British politician and joint Parliamentary Under-Secretary of State for Foreign Affairs 1782–83. It is thought that he was born at Hole House, Edmundbyers, in the parish of Lanchester in County Durham. He died suddenly in Paris on 27 Aug 1783, suspected to have been poisoned.

His brother John (born 1742, died 24 Oct 1808, age 65) held diplomatic positions, including in the receiver general's office in the Post Office in 1766 and secretary for the foreign department 11 July 1787. He was sent to Russia to learn the language and was a collector of books, over 5,000 were sold at auction after his death.

== Background ==
Alexander Maddison bought Hole House, Allensford, co. Durham in 1595. George Maddison and his brother John were the last heirs in his male line, commemorated in All Saints' Church, Lanchester. They were sons of John Maddison (died 1793), and his wife Elizabeth Todd, sister of Anthony Todd (died 1798), Post Office official.

== Career ==
The Parliamentary Under-Secretary of State for Foreign Affairs has been a junior position in the British government since 1782, subordinate to the Secretary of State for Foreign Affairs. Maddison held this position (jointly with William Fraser) from 1782 to 1783. He was the second (joint) holder of the position.

Maddison held various government diplomatic positions, and while serving as Under-Secretary received a promotion on 2 April 1783 to Secretary to the Extraordinary Embassy to his most Christian Majesty. He received an allowance of £300 for his equipage and 40 shillings (£2) a day for his ordinary entertainment.

== Ode to the River Derwent ==
Maddison was mentioned in "Ode to the River Derwent", a poem of some 40 verses by John Carr, which appeared in The Bishoprick Garland of 1834 by Sir Cuthbert Sharp.

The last four lines of the poem are as follows:

Say, when will thou cease to complain?
Oh, Derwent! thy destiny cries:
Far off, on the banks of the Seine,
Thy darling, thy Maddison dies!

and are inscribed on his monument.

== See also ==
- Geordie dialect words
