= John Lavery =

Irish painter (1856–1941)

Sir John Lavery RA RSA RHA
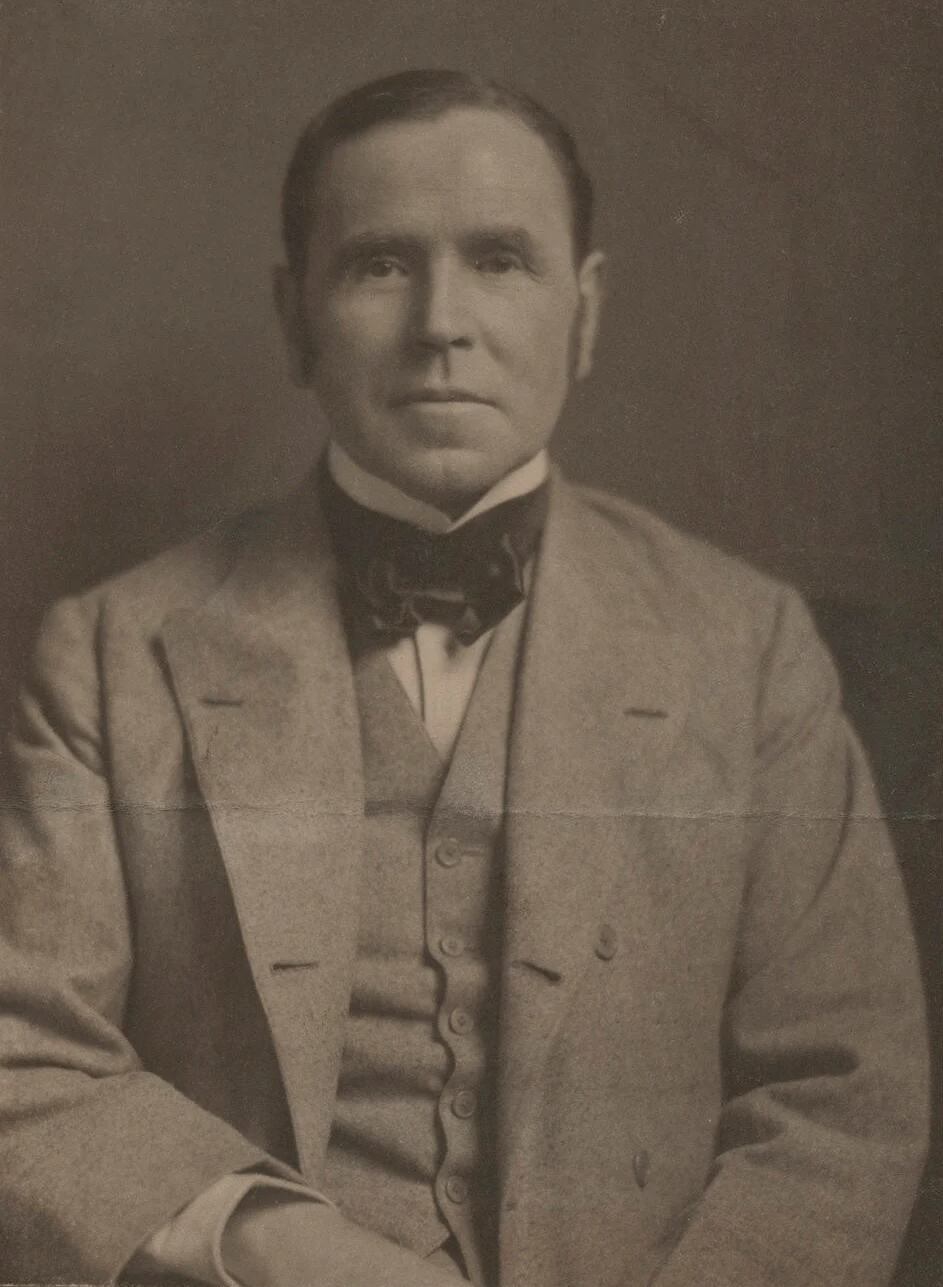
- Lavery in 1909
- Born: 20 March 1856; Belfast, County Antrim, Ireland
- Died: 10 January 1941 (aged 84); Kilmoganny, County Kilkenny, Ireland
- Resting place: Putney Vale Cemetery
- Education: Haldane Academy
- Known for: portraits and wartime depictions
- Spouse(s): Kathleen MacDermott (1889–1891); Hazel Martyn (1909–1935)

Sir John Lavery RA RSA RHA (20 March 1856 – 10 January 1941) was an Irish painter best known for his portraits and wartime depictions.

== Life and career ==
John Lavery was born in inner North Belfast, on 20 March 1856 and baptised at St Patrick's Church, Belfast. He was the son of Henry Lavery and Margaret Lavery née Donnelly. Henry Lavery drowned, in the sinking of the packet ship Pomona, April 1859, off Co. Wexford, Ireland, en route for New York, and his widow died not long after. The orphaned John Lavery, at times with his sister Jane Lavery, later Callaghan, moved between Ireland and Scotland. He attended Haldane Academy in Glasgow in the 1870s. In 1878, he set up his own studio which was razed in a fire in the following year. With a £300 insurance pay-out, he spent a year studying at Heatherley's School in London. Lavery continued his studies at the Académie Julian in Paris in the early 1880s. He returned to Glasgow and was associated with the Glasgow School. William Burrell, a wealthy shipowner, was a faithful patron of Scottish artists including Joseph Crawhall II, with whom Lavery studied. In 1888, he was commissioned to paint the state visit of Queen Victoria to the Glasgow International Exhibition. This launched his career as a society painter and he moved to London soon after. The same year Lavery’s sister Jane, who in 1880 had married John Callaghan, a pawnbroker, drowned herself in the River Clyde. Lavery was to paint a Posthumous Portrait of Jane Lavery towards the end of his life (1935). In 1896, William Burrell commissioned Lavery to paint a portrait of his sister Mary Burrell. This portrait was exhibited widely and is considered one of Lavery's finest works. Another portrait of Mrs. Burrell was altered to become The Red Rose portrait of Hazel Lavery.

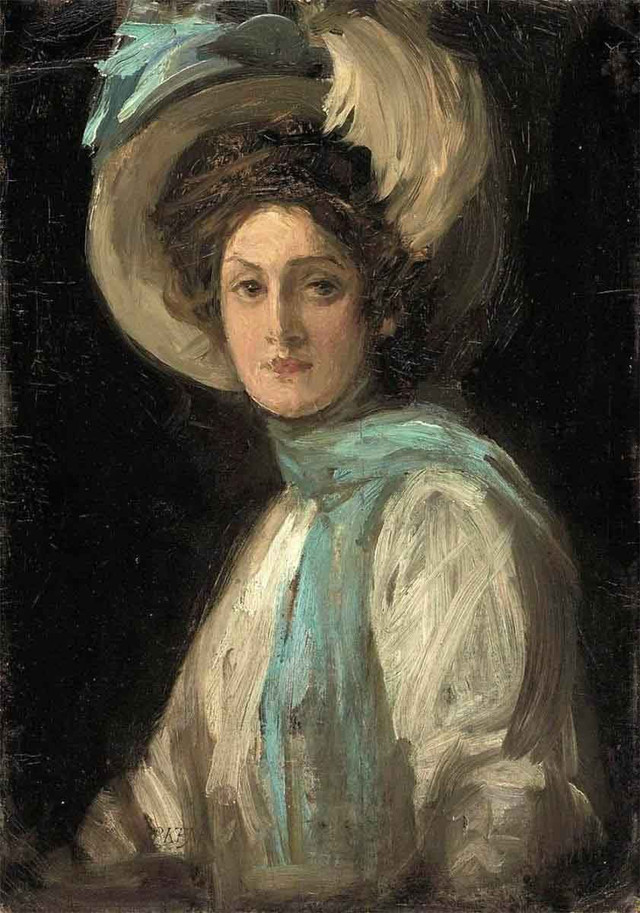
Kathleen MacDermott - A Lady in Blue and White, 1890

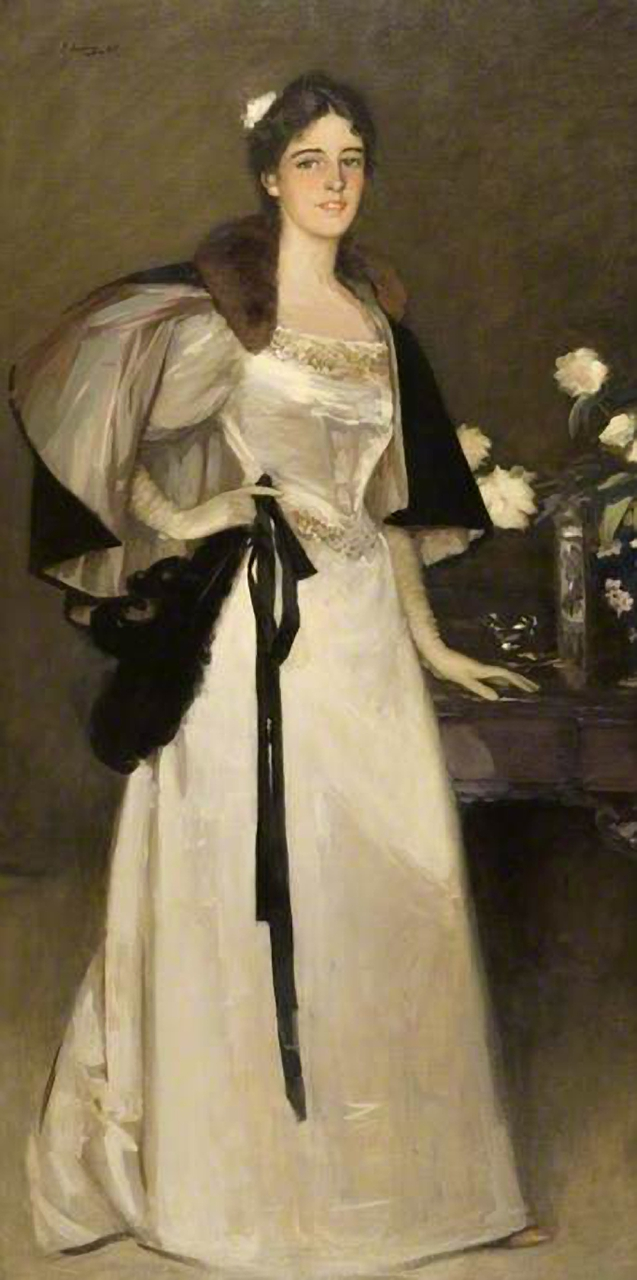
Miss Mary Burrell

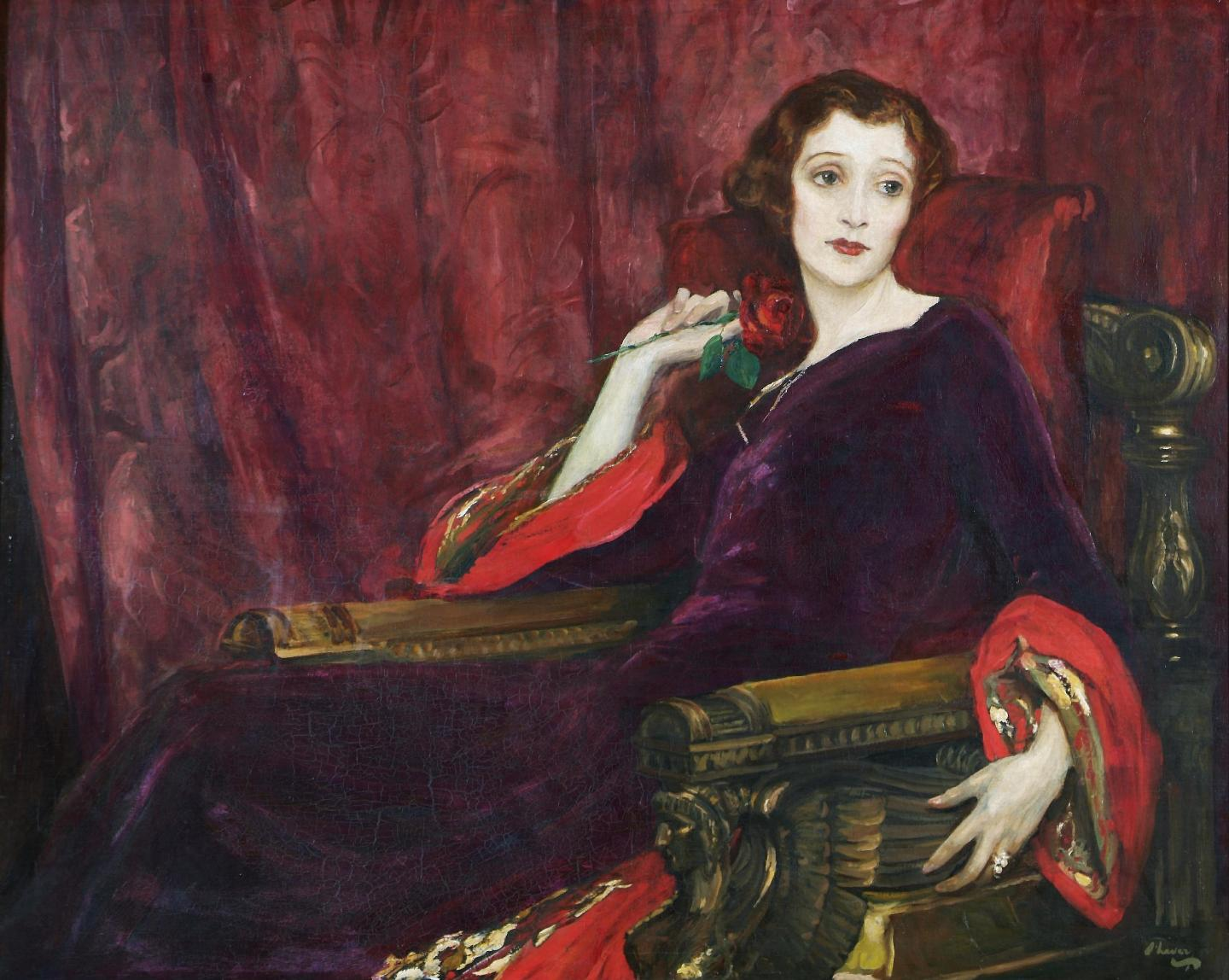
Hazel Lavery - The Red Rose, 1923

In his memoir, Lavery acknowledged Burrell's patronage.

From 1910, he painted portraits of notable subjects including Winston Churchill, H. H. Asquith, Lord Derby, and the Irish politicians John Redmond and Edward Carson. He also painted a number of naval pictures of the fleet at Scapa Flow, which he presented to the Imperial War Museum.

In London, Lavery became friendly with James McNeill Whistler and was clearly influenced by him.

Like William Orpen, Lavery was appointed an official artist in the First World War. Ill health, however, prevented him from travelling to the Western Front. A serious car crash during a Zeppelin bombing raid also kept him from fulfilling this role as a war artist. He remained in Britain and mostly painted boats, aeroplanes and airships. During the war years, he was a close friend of the Asquith family and spent time with them at their Sutton Courtenay Thames-side residence, painting their portraits and idyllic pictures like Summer on the River (Hugh Lane Gallery).

After the war he was knighted and in 1921 he was elected to the Royal Academy. His work was also part of the art competitions at the 1924 Summer Olympics, the 1928 Summer Olympics, and the 1932 Summer Olympics. In the late 1920s, he selected the coral blue and silver colour scheme for the Empress Ballroom on the Clyde-built liner Empress of Britain.

During this time, he and his wife, Hazel, were tangentially involved in the Irish War of Independence and the Irish Civil War. They gave the use of their London home to the Irish negotiators during the negotiations leading to the Anglo-Irish Treaty. After Michael Collins was assassinated, Lavery painted Michael Collins, Love of Ireland, now in the Hugh Lane Municipal Gallery in Dublin. In 1923 Lavery was commissioned by the newly established Irish Free State to design its new paper currency. The woman's face on the Irish currency was that of his American born wife, Hazel. In 1929, Lavery made substantial donations of his work to both The Ulster Museum and the Hugh Lane Municipal Gallery and in the 1930s he returned to Ireland. He received honorary degrees from the University of Dublin and Queen's University Belfast. He was also made a freeman of both Dublin and Belfast. A long-standing member of Glasgow Art Club, Lavery exhibited at the club's annual exhibitions, including its exhibition in 1939 in which his The Lake at Ranelagh was included.

== Personal life ==
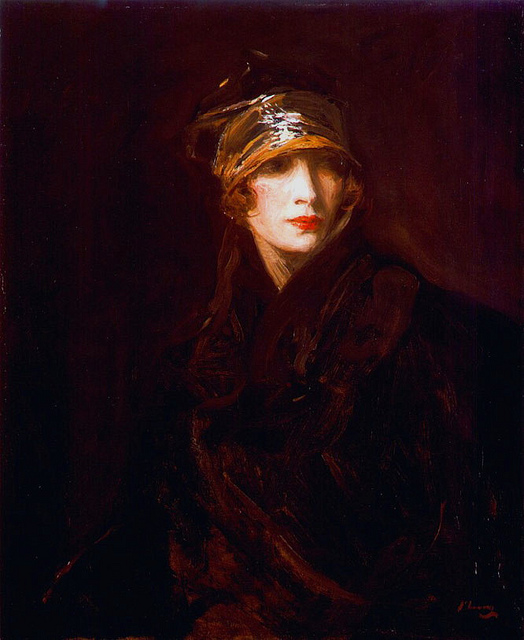
Woman with golden turban, Hazel Lavery née Hazel Martyn

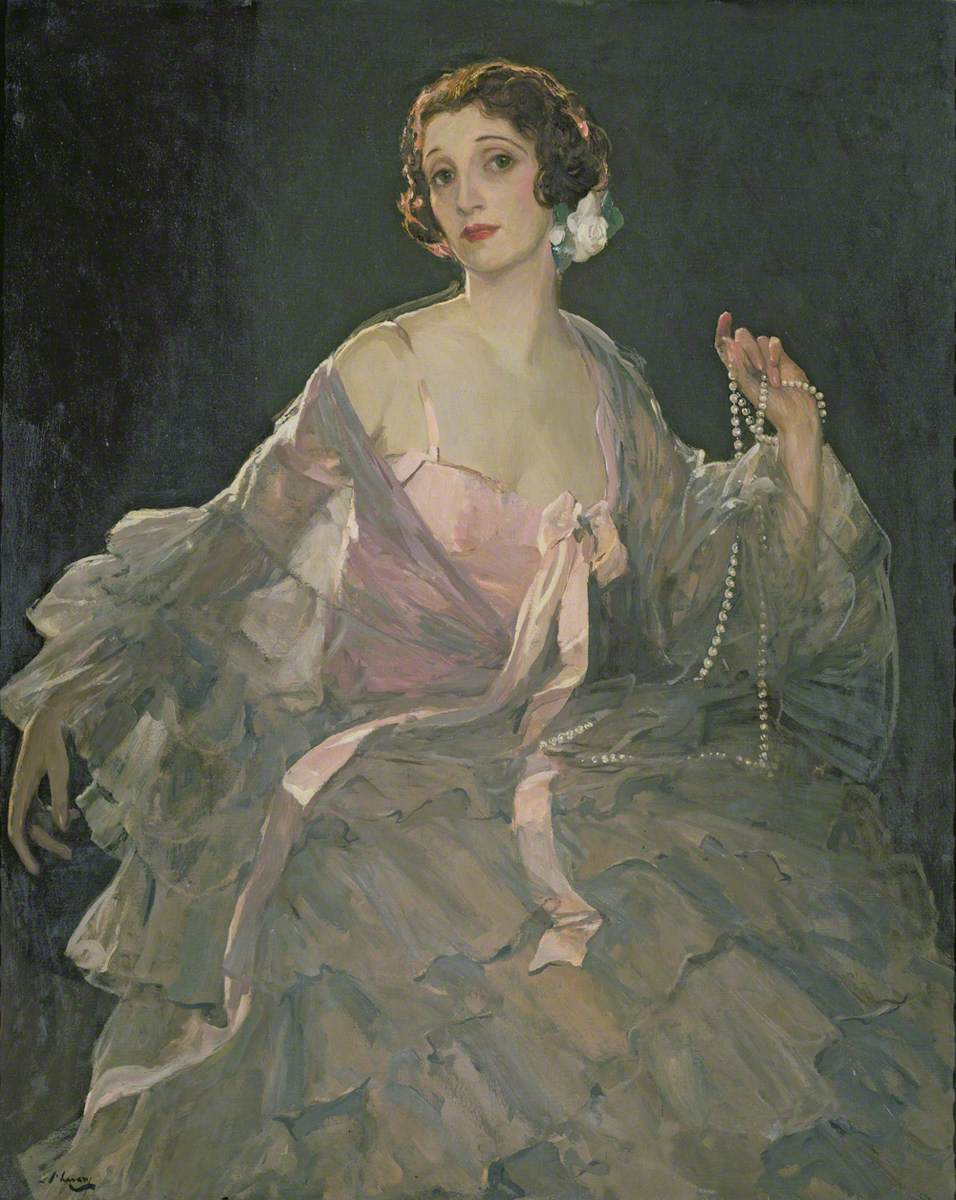
Hazel in rose and grey

Lavery was an orphan raised by relatives in Moira, County Down. Lavery's first wife, Kathleen MacDermott, whom he married in 1889, died of tuberculosis in 1891, shortly after the birth of their daughter, Eileen (later Lady Sempill, 1890–1935).

In 1909 Lavery remarried, to Hazel Martyn (1886–1935), an Irish-American known for her beauty and poise, who had a daughter, Alice Trudeau (Mrs. Jack McEnery, from 1963 Mrs Denis Rolleston Gwynn) (1904-1991) from a previous marriage. Hazel Lavery was depicted in more than 400 of her husband's paintings. The sumptuous The Artist's Studio: Lady Lavery with her Daughter Alice and Step-Daughter Eileen, is currently in the National Gallery of Ireland.

Hazel Lavery modelled for the allegorical figure of Ireland he painted on commission from the Irish government, reproduced on Irish banknotes from 1928 until 1975 and then as a watermark until the introduction of the Euro in 2002. The Laverys' marriage was tempestuous, and Lady Lavery rumoured to have been unfaithful.

Sir John Lavery died in Rossenarra House, Kilmoganny, County Kilkenny on 10 January 1941, aged 84, from natural causes, and was interred in Putney Vale Cemetery.

== Works in collections ==
- Aberdeen Art Gallery
- Birmingham Museum & Art Gallery
- Burrell Collection, Glasgow
  - Portrait of Miss Mary Burrell
- Cecil Higgins Art Gallery
- Crawford Municipal Art Gallery, Cork, including:
  - The Red Rose (1923)
- Guildhall Art Gallery, London
- Hugh Lane Gallery, Dublin, including:
  - Sutton Courtenay, (Summer on the River or The Wharf) (1917)
  - Japanese Switzerland
- Imperial War Museum
- Irish Museum of Modern Art (IMMA)
  - Miss Flora Lion in Her Oriental Costume Deaccessioned 2000
- Kelvingrove Art Gallery, Glasgow, including Anna Pavlova
- Laing Art Gallery
- National Gallery of Ireland, Dublin
- Rothe House, Kilkenny
- National Museum of Serbia, Belgrade
- Tate Gallery, London, including:
  - The Glasgow Exhibition 1888 (1888)
  - The Chess Players (1929)
- Ulster Museum, Belfast
- Walker Art Gallery, Liverpool, including: "Hazel in Rose and Gold".

=== Lavery on Location ===
Lavery on Location

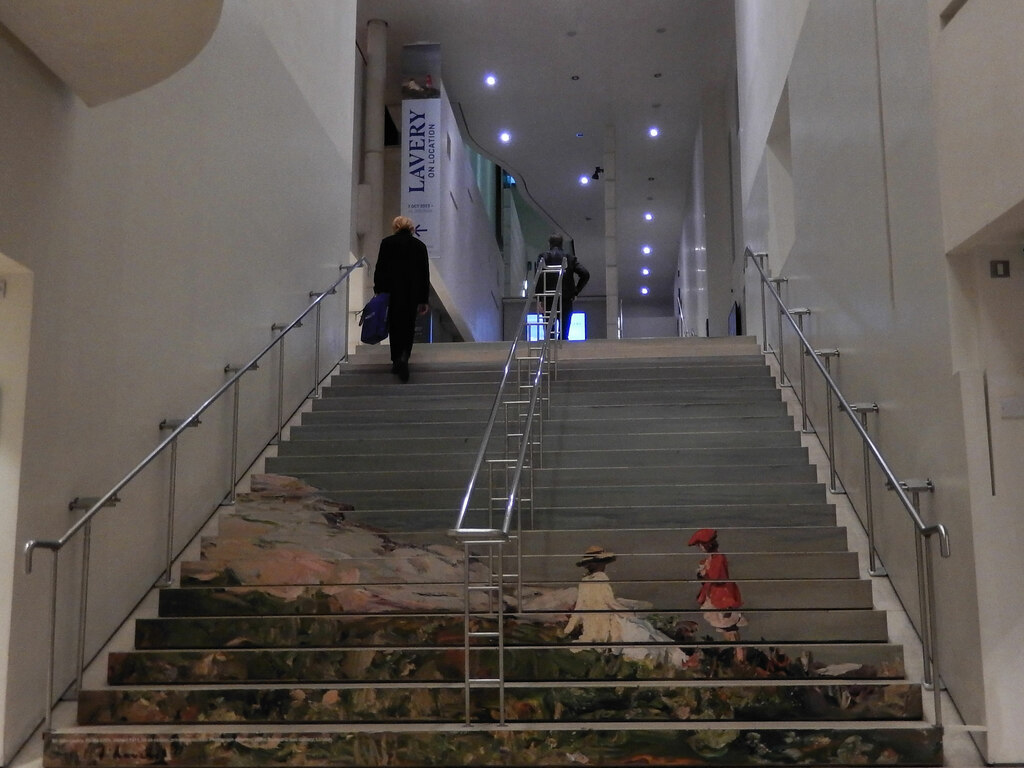
The National Gallery of Ireland staircase to the exhibition in December 2023.

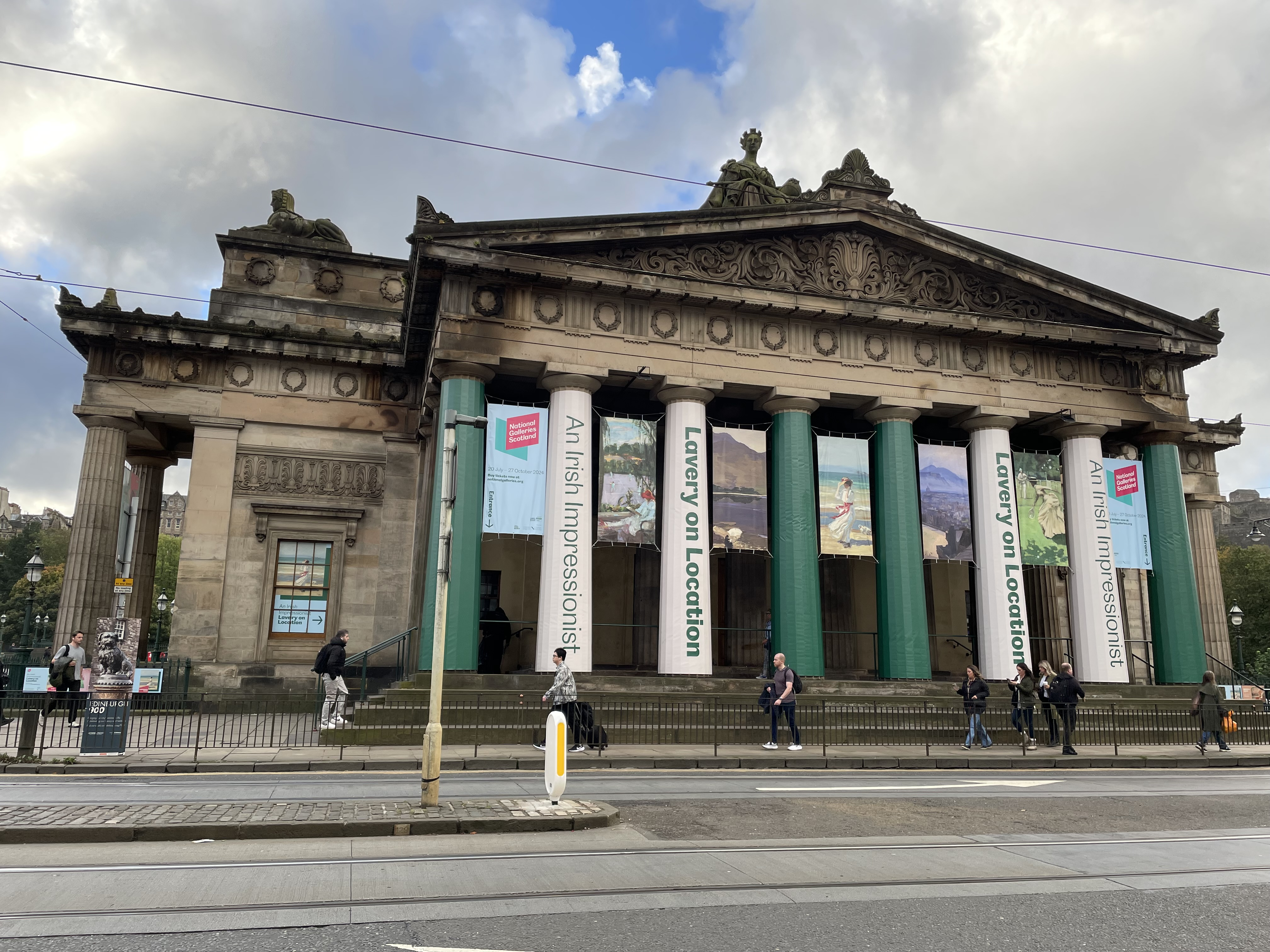
The Royal Scottish Academy building advertising the exhibition in October 2024.

The Lavery on Location touring exhibition brought together works by Lavery to three national galleries for the first time.

- National Gallery of Ireland, Dublin (7 October 2023–14 January 2024).
- Ulster Museum, Belfast (27 February–6 June 2024).
- Royal Scottish Academy (RSA), Edinburgh (20 July–27 October 2024). In the RSA the full name of the exhibition was An Irish Impressionist | Lavery on Location.
Wartime pictures

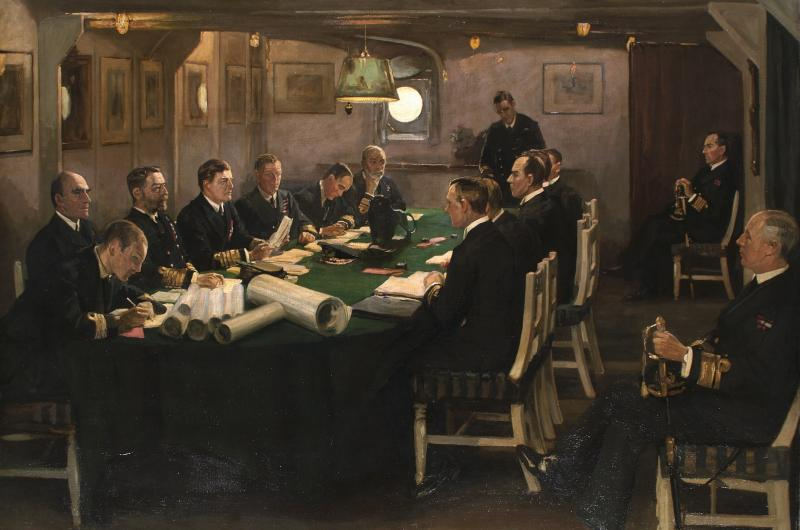
War Room – depicts surrender of the German High Seas Fleet on board of HMS Queen Elizabeth (November 1918)

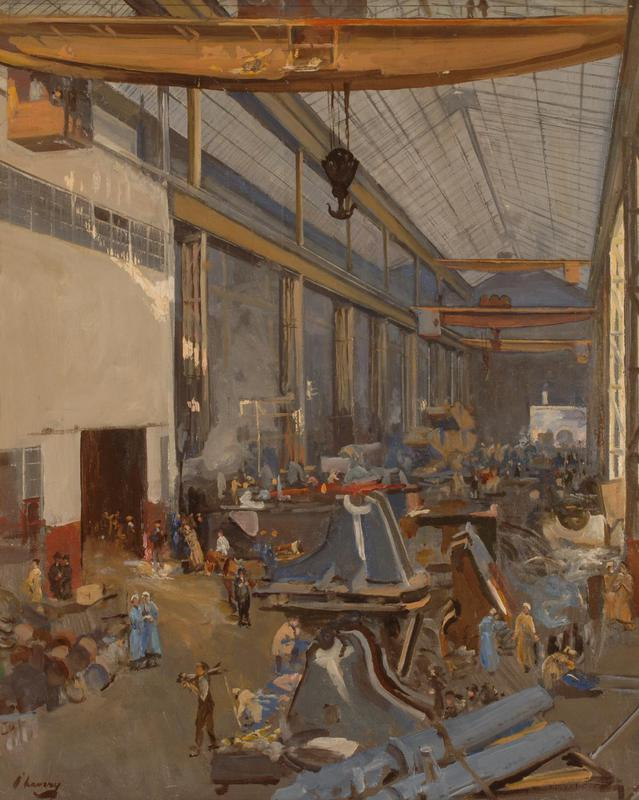
Munitions, Newcastle, 1917

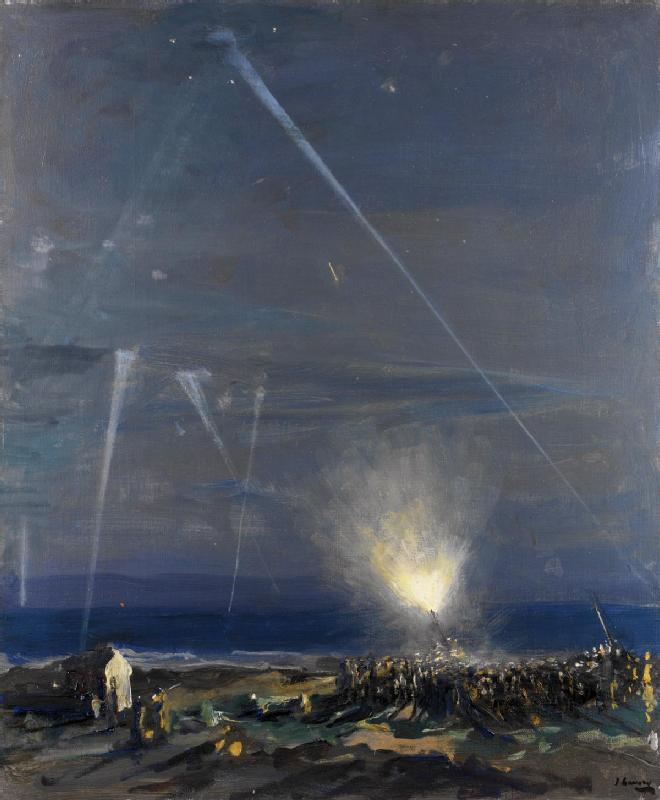
A Coast Defence – an 18-pounder anti-aircraft gun, Tyneside, 1917

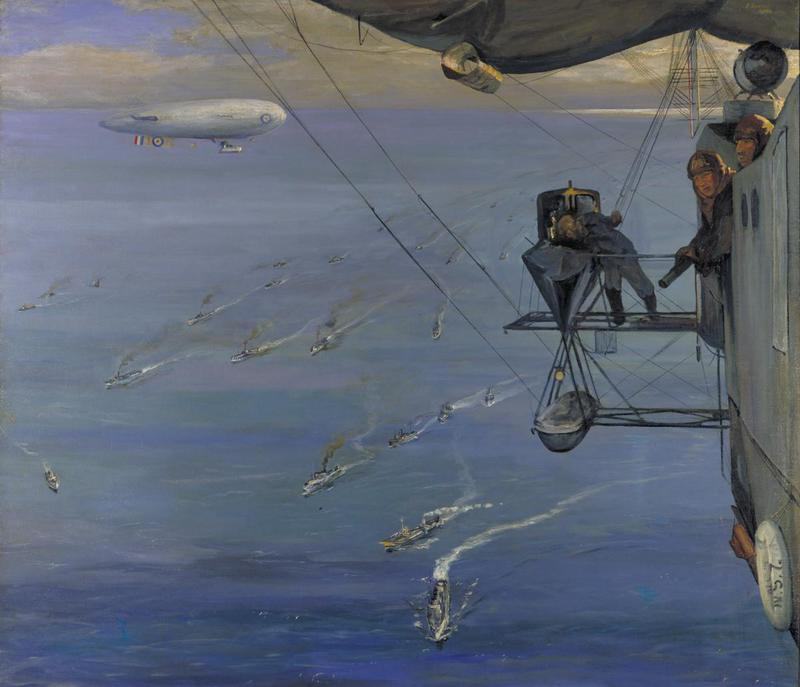
A Convoy, North Sea, 1918

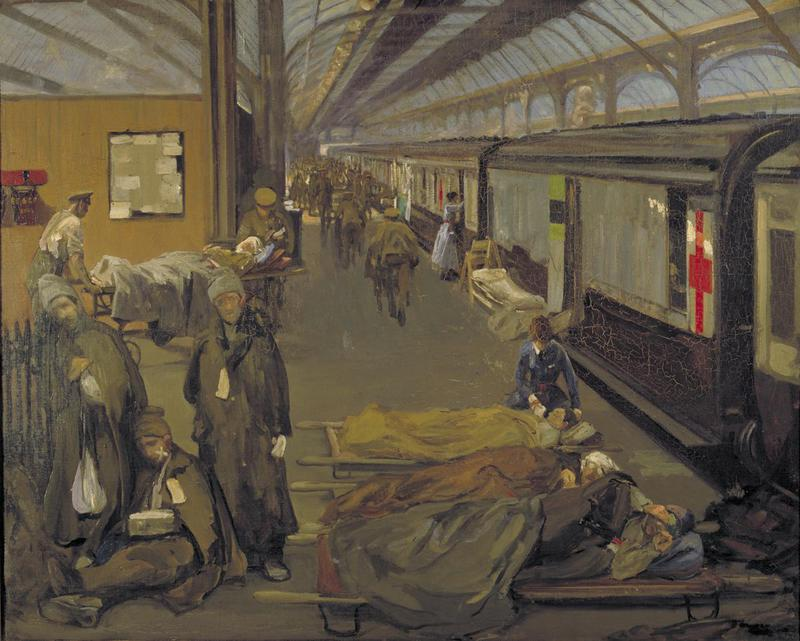
The Wounded at Dover, 1918

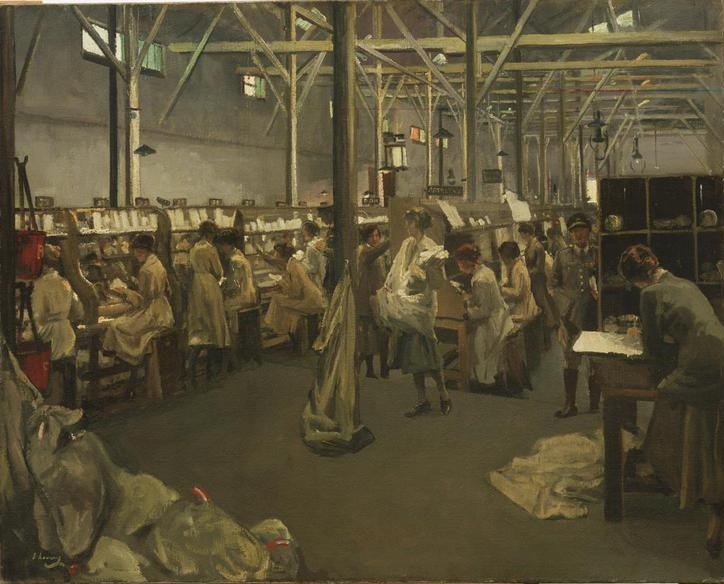
Army Post Office 3, Boulogne, 1919
Other

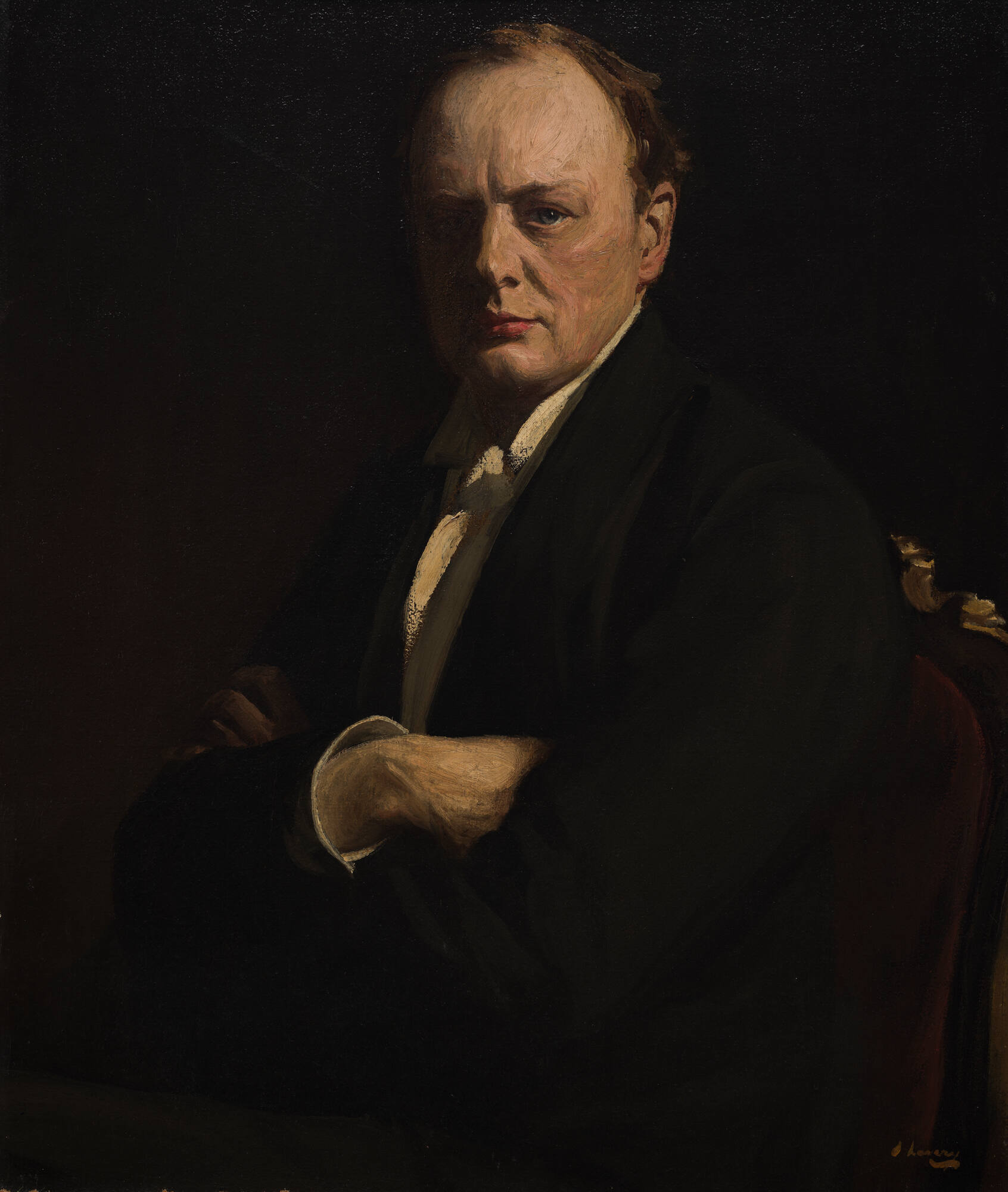
Winston Churchill, 1915

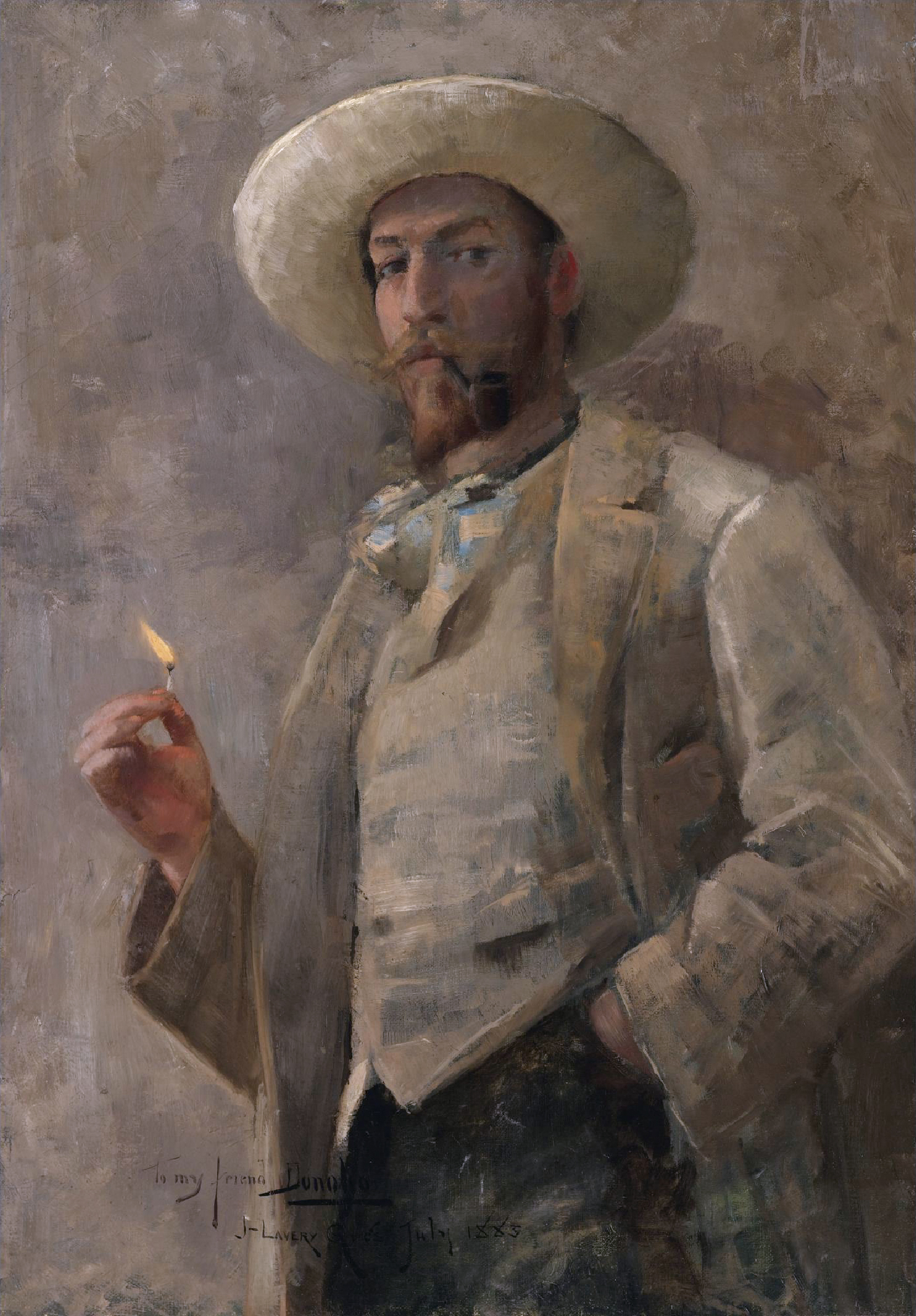
Gaines Ruger Donoho

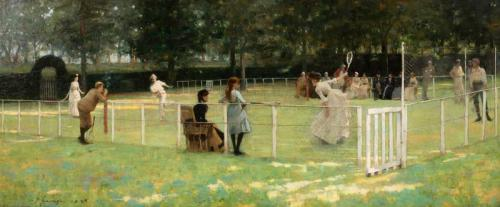
The Tennis Party, 1885, Aberdeen Art Gallery

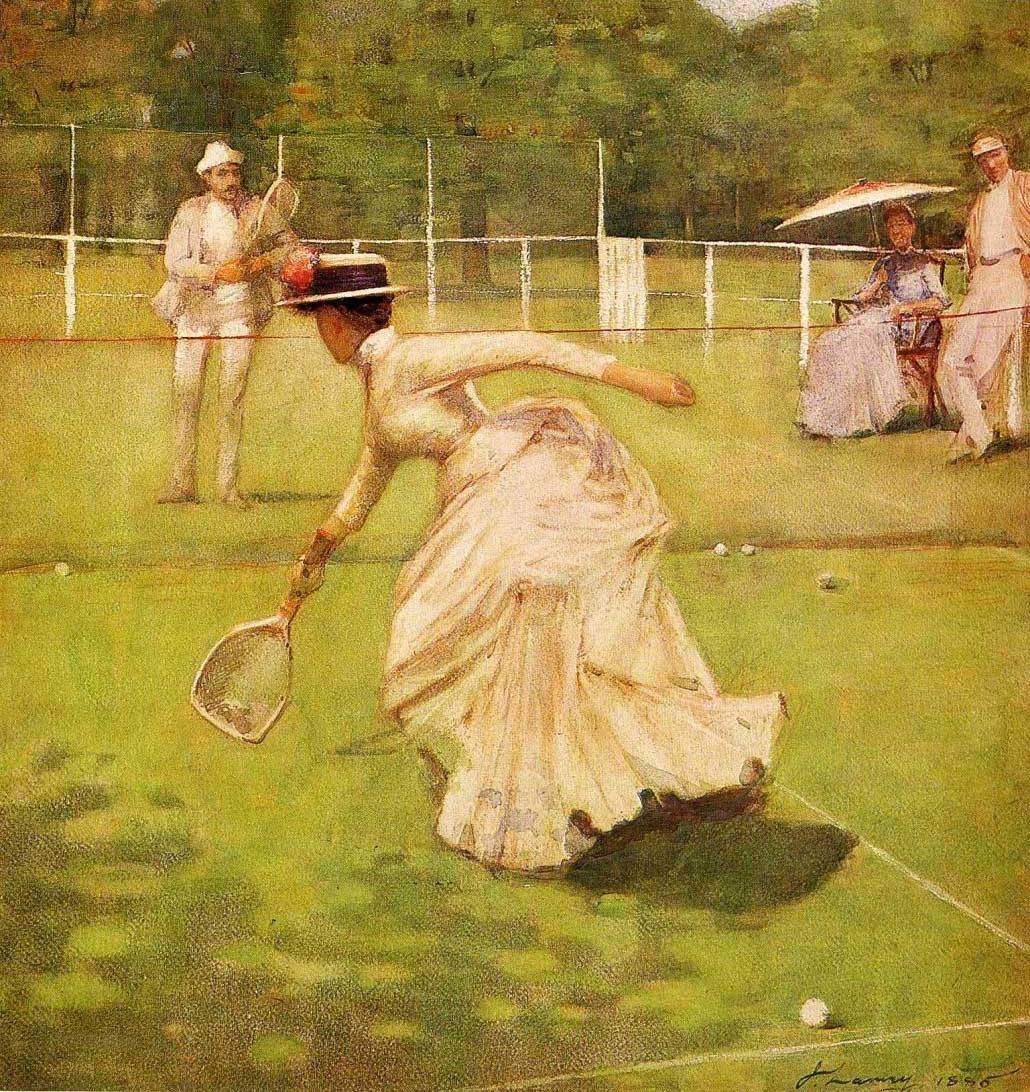
Sir John Lavery, A Rally, 1885

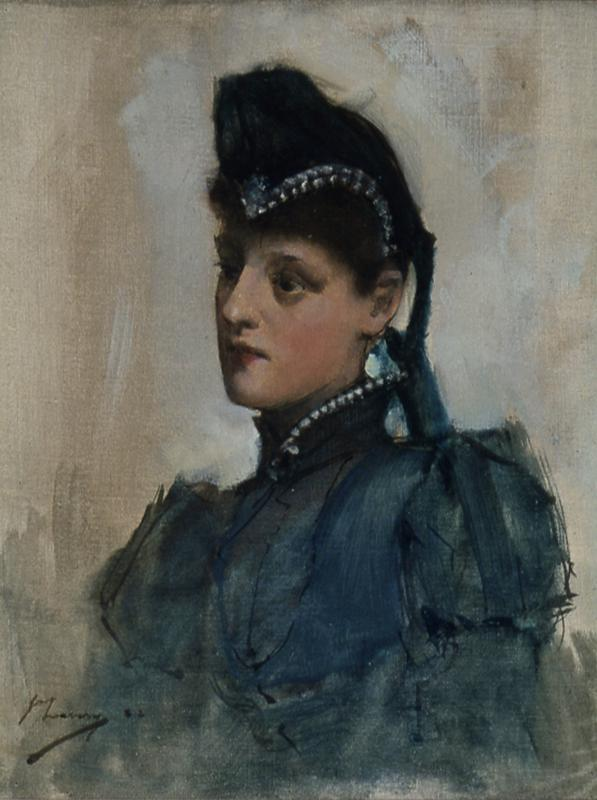
Portrait of a Young Woman, 1888

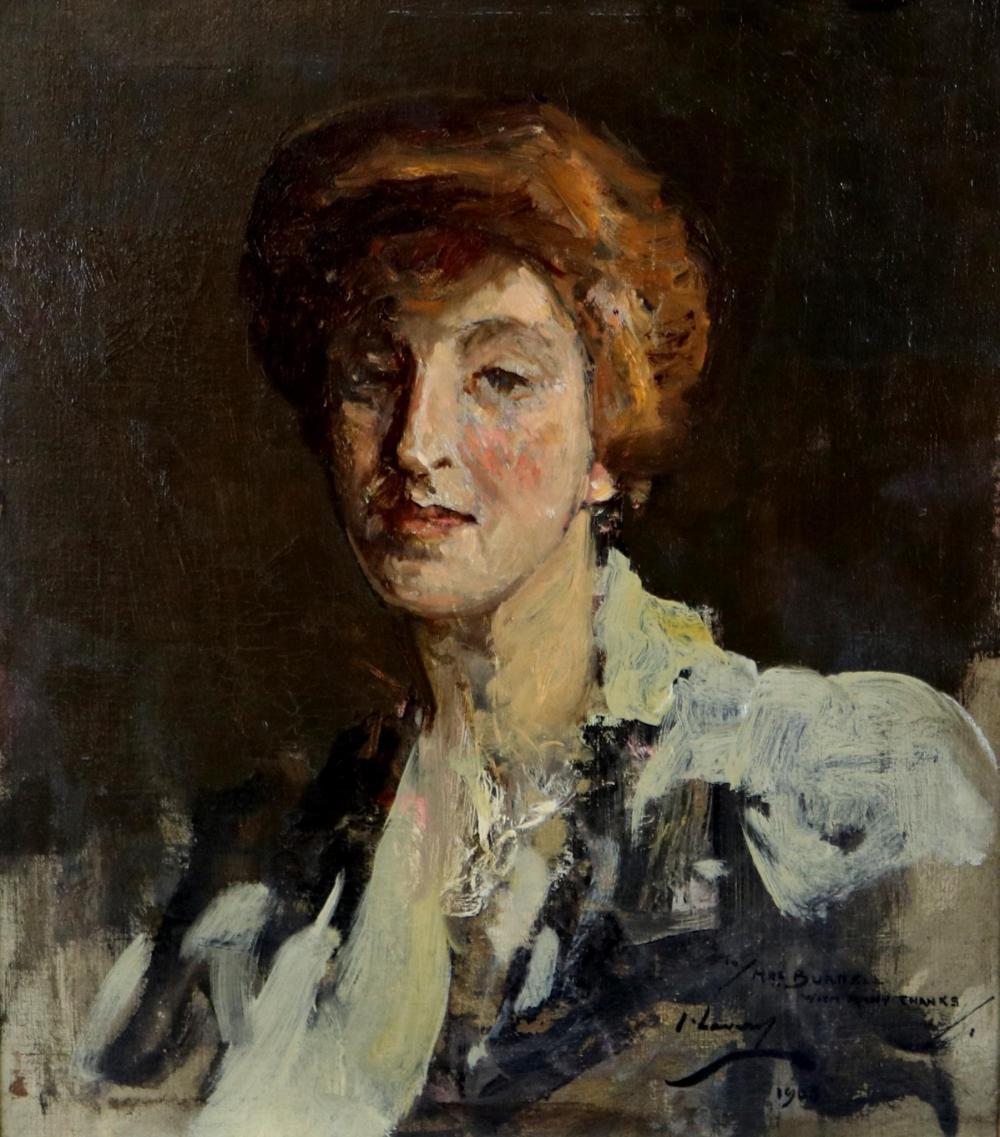
Portrait of Mrs Burrell

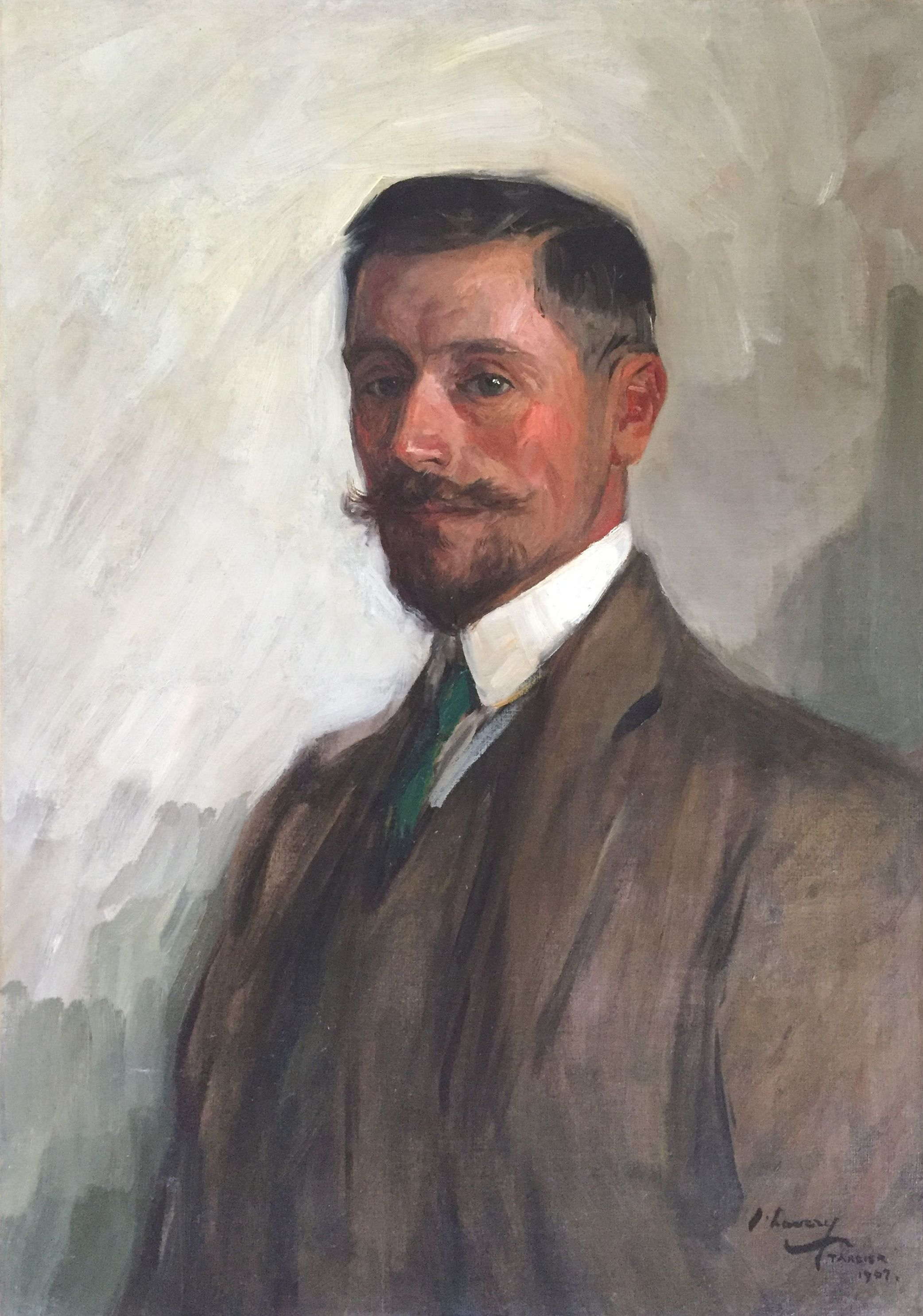
Walter Burton Harris, 1907

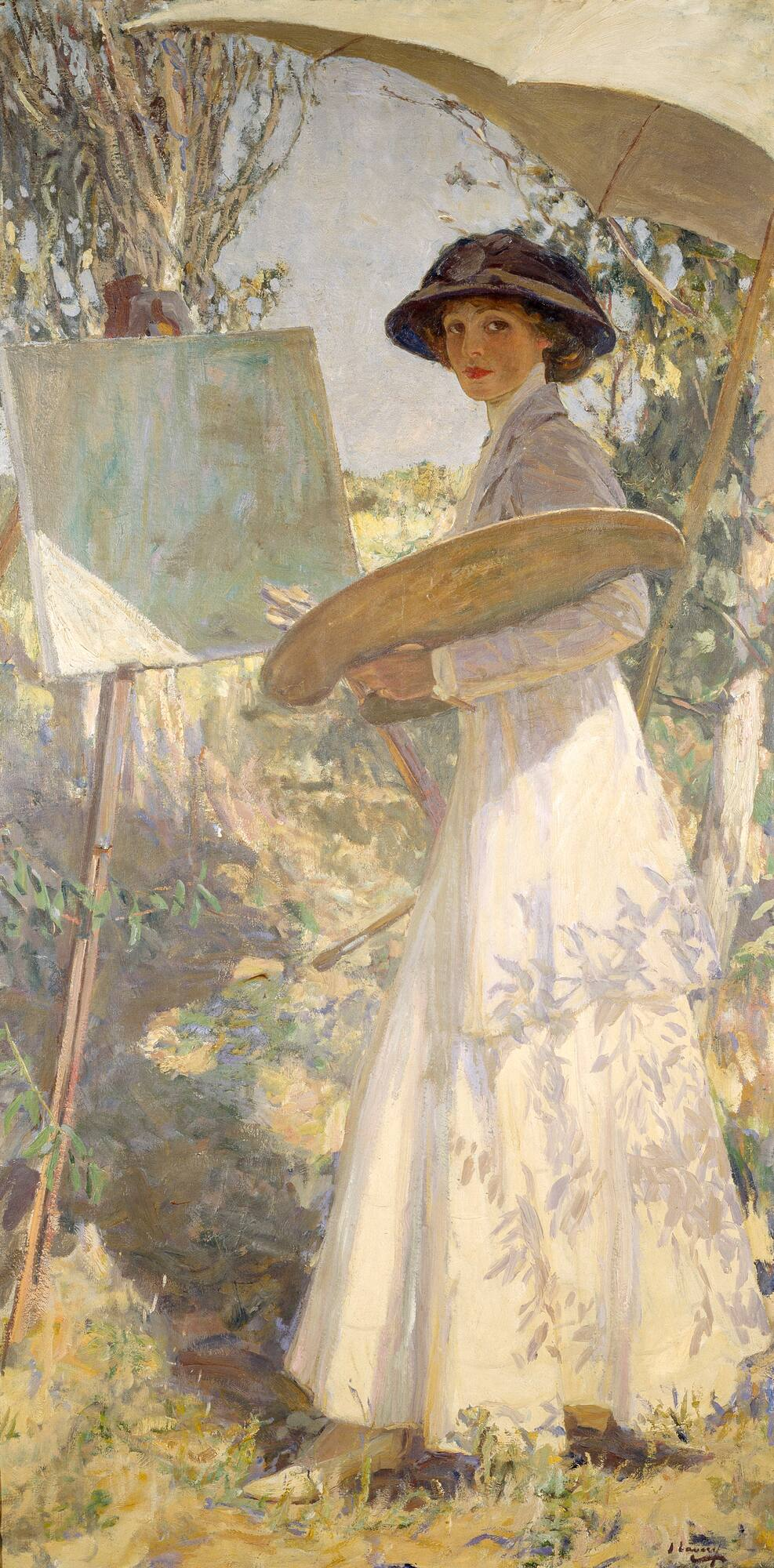
Mrs Lavery sketching, 1910

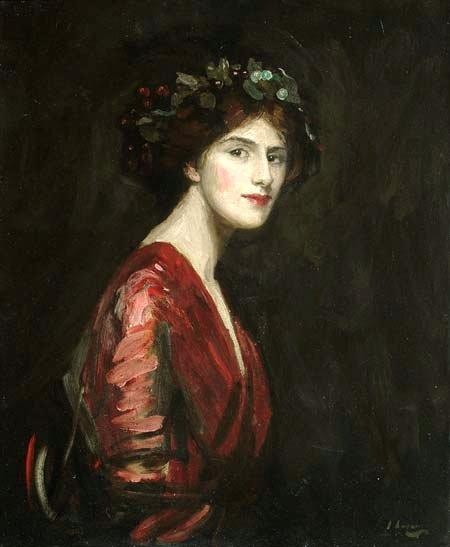
Mrs Ralph Peto as a Bacchante

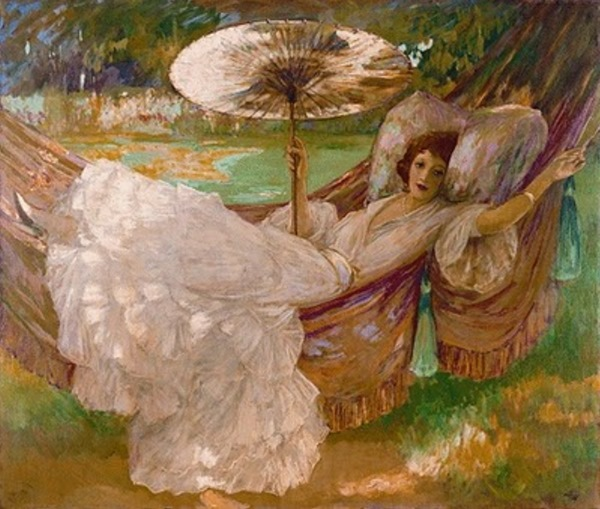
Lady Lavery

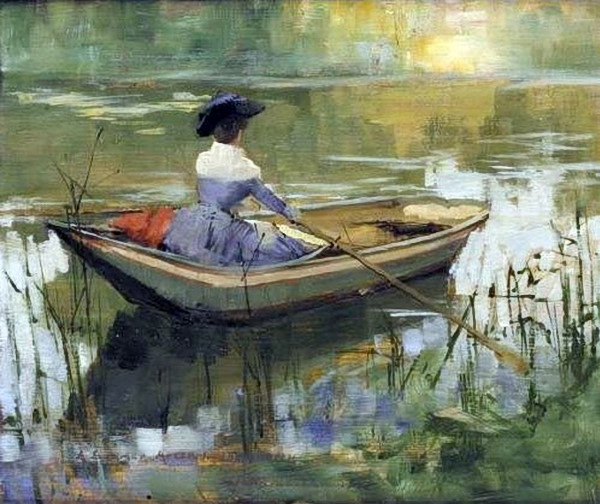
A Summer Afternoon

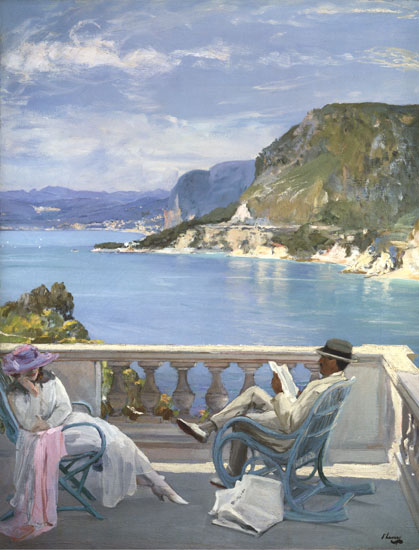
On the Riviera

The Jockeys' Dressing Room at Ascot, 1923

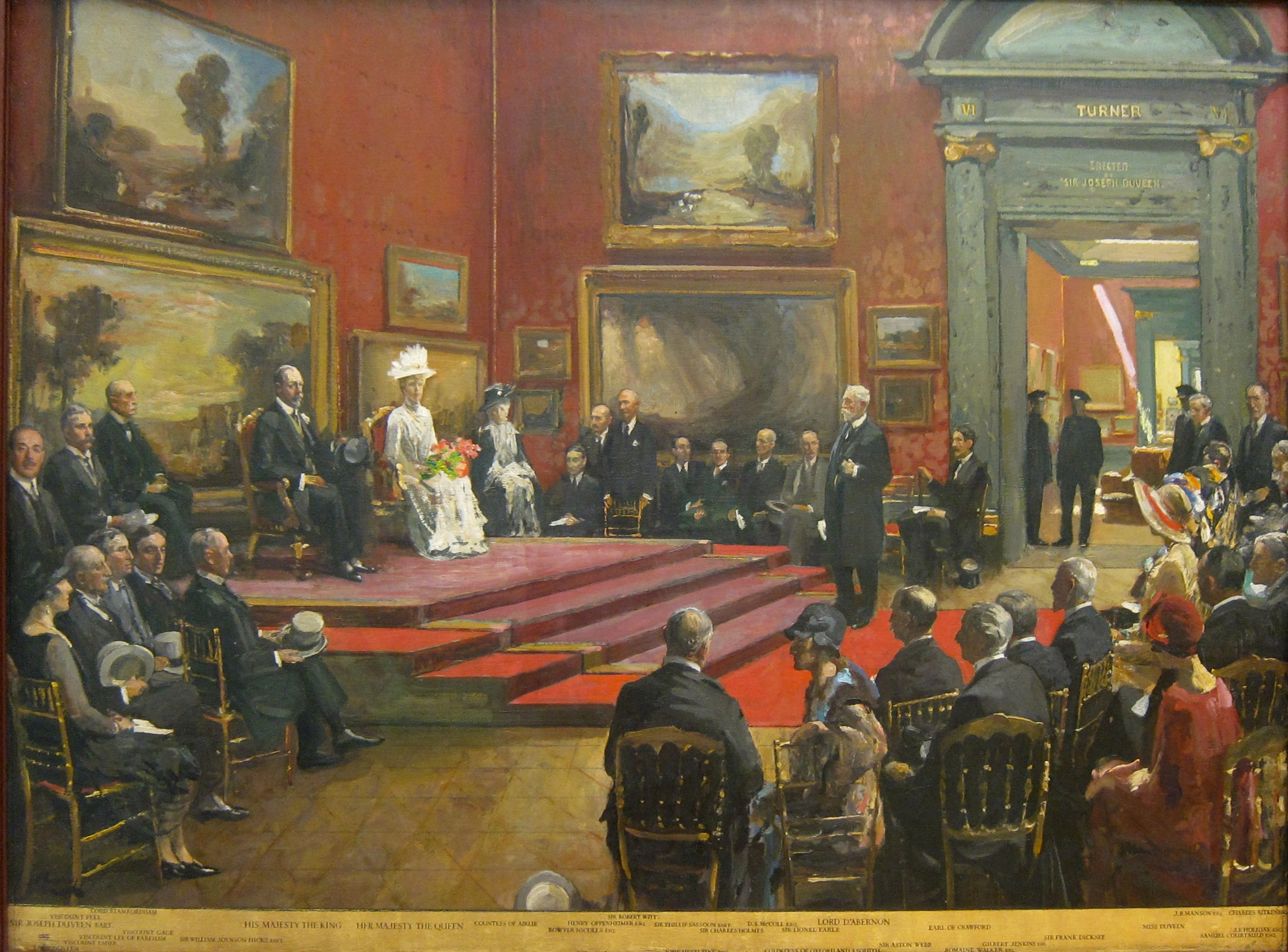
The Opening of the Modern Foreign and Sargent Galleries at the Tate Gallery, 26 June 1926

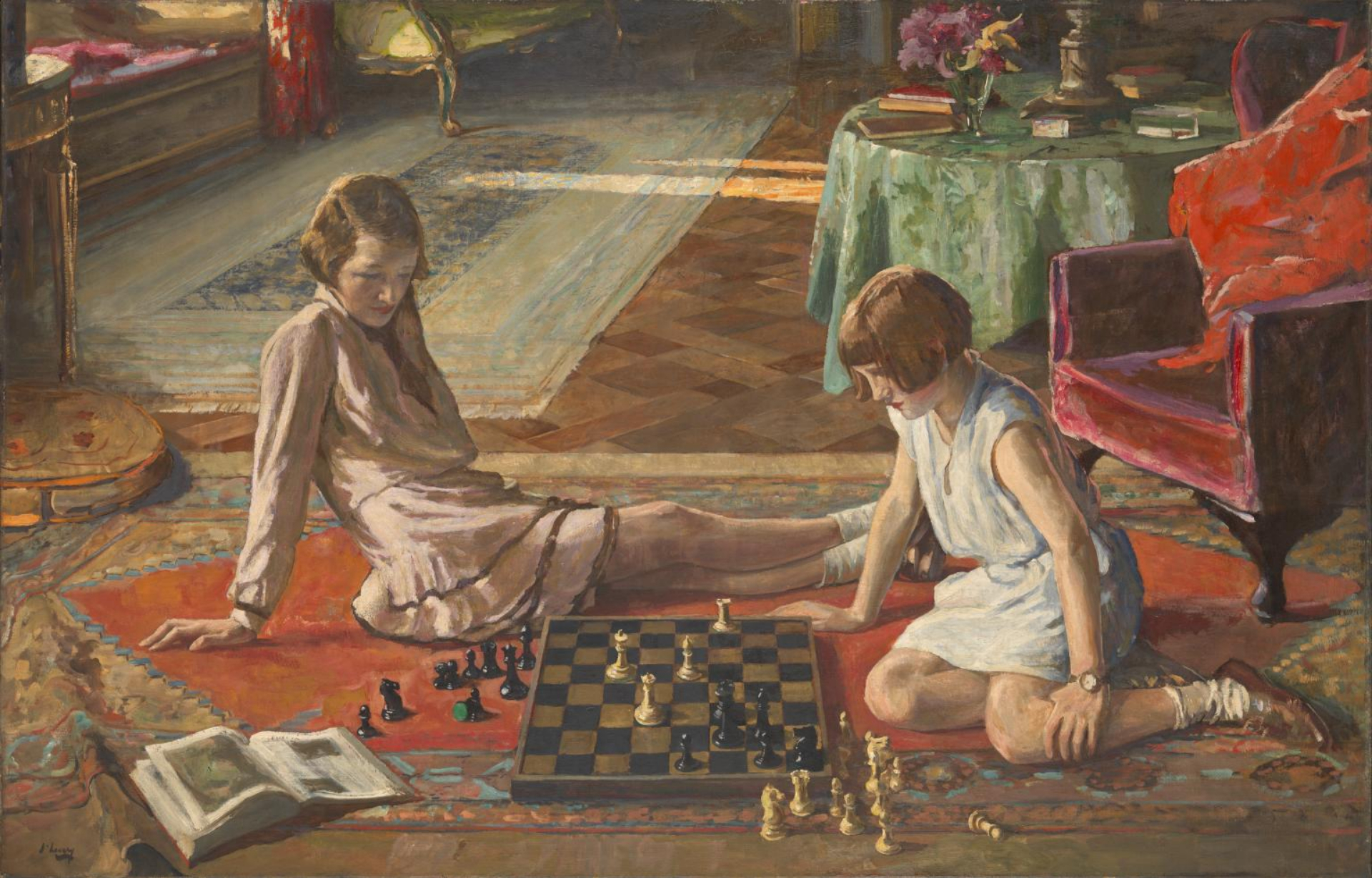
The Chess Players, 1929

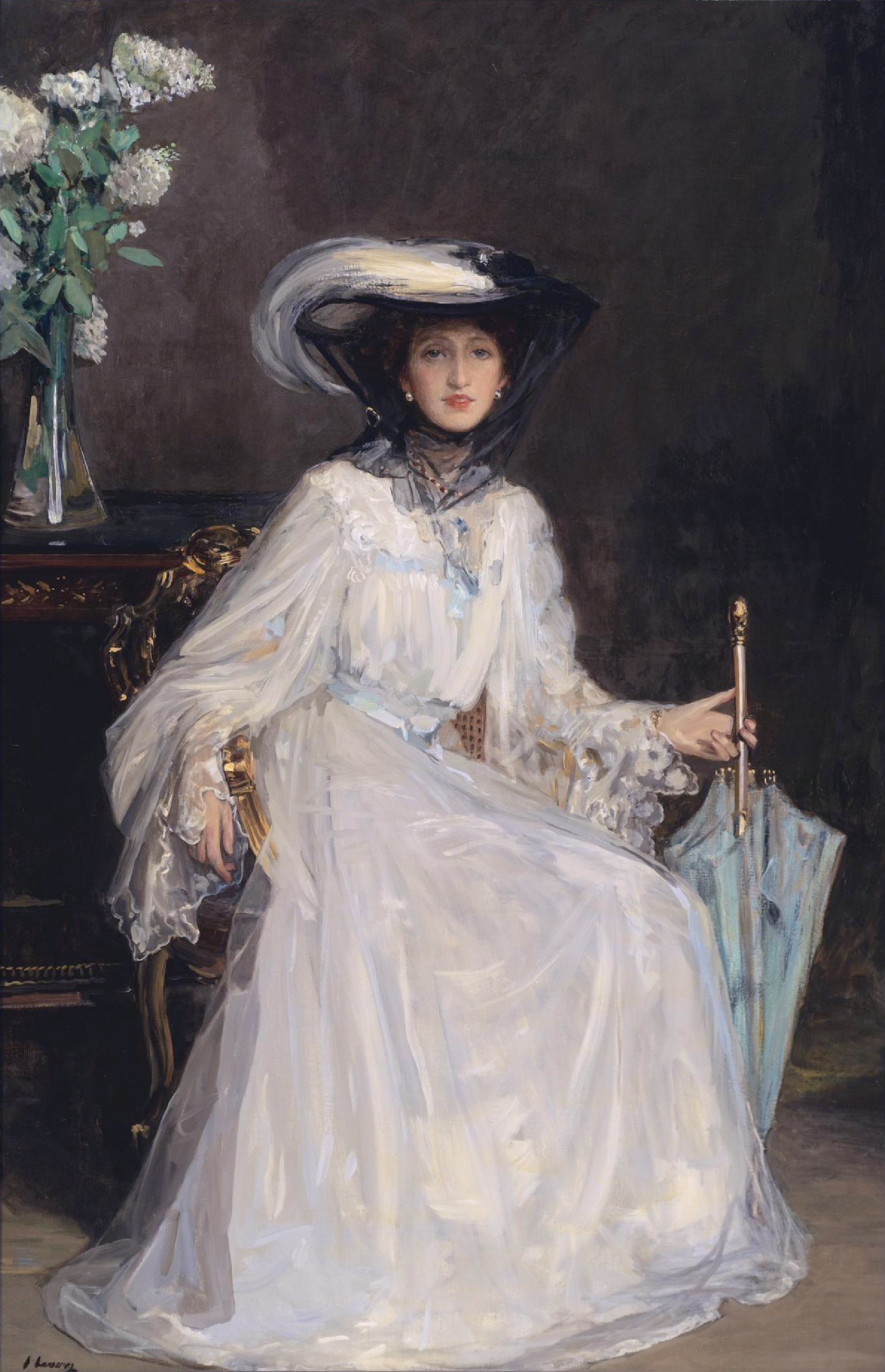
Lady Evelyn Farquhar, 1906

== See also ==
- List of Irish artists
- List of Orientalist artists
- Orientalism
- Anna Pavlova
