= Thomas Clerke (songwriter) =

Thomas Clerke was a Sunderland singer/songwriter and poet from the seventeenth and/or eighteenth century.

Thomas Clerke was said to be a “Gentleman of powerful convivial talents and the author of several spirited, and Anacreontic¹ songs” many of which are now attributed to others.

His works include:

- Sons of the Wear
- Musical Club
- Ode to Silver Street
- Spottee – appears in The Bishoprick Garland by (Sir) Cuthbert Sharp and also A Beuk o’ Newcassell Sangs by Joseph Crawhall.
- ’Tis all that I desire (actual title unknown) – an extract of which appears in The Bishoprick Garland.

¹ Anacreontic = in the manner of the Greek lyric poet Anacreon (?572–?488 BC), noted for his short songs celebrating love and wine - or (of verse) in praise of love or wine; amatory or convivial

== See also ==
- Geordie dialect words
- Cuthbert Sharp
- The Bishoprick Garland 1834 by Sharp
