= Jane Frizzle =

Jane Frizzle (c.1600) lived in the seventeenth century in the Derwent Valley near Muggleswick Common, Edmundbyers, County Durham. She lived in a farm cottage known by the name of "Crooked Oak", situated to the north of Mosswood Banks, the birch clad "Sneep” with its rocky point, and the Badger Wood; the cottage probably getting its name from the fact that there was a gnarled oak tree in the vicinity.

The cottage was of Jacobean origin, with an ornamental doorway, surmounted by a stone lintel, carved into which was “1684” and “T” and “I.R.”, being the date the cottage was built and the initials of the owners/builders.

She appeared to live alone, and was, as such, probably wrinkled and a "little odd", which is why she was considered to be a witch by many of the local country-folk.

No one knows when she died, and the only “definite?” fact is that she lived in the seventeenth century and is thought to be buried in the corner of a field at Greenhead, near Carterway Heads.

She is mentioned in “Ode to the River Derwent”, a poem of some 40 verses by John Carr which appears in The Bishoprick Garland of 1834 by Sir Cuthbert Sharp.

== See also ==
- Geordie dialect words
- Cuthbert Sharp
- The Bishoprick Garland 1834 by Sharp
