= Blow the Wind Southerly =

Traditional song

"Blow the Wind Southerly" is a traditional English folk song from Northumbria. It tells of a woman desperately hoping for a southerly wind to blow her lover back home over the sea to her. It is Roud number 2619.

== History ==
"Blow the Wind Southerly" is a folk song with origins in Wearside. The chorus of "Blow the Wind Southerly" first appeared in print in the 1834 publication The Bishoprick Garland by Cuthbert Sharp. The 1882 book Northumbrian Minstrelsy published an arrangement by John Collingwood Bruce and John Stokoe of the chorus in D major and a 6/8 time signature. In the 1892 book Songs and Ballads of Northern England, Stokoe added to "Blow the Wind Southerly" three new verses written by John Stobbs on a broadside.

== Recordings and arrangements ==
Kathleen Ferrier made an a cappella recording that is perhaps the best-known version of the song in 1949, released by Decca Records. Oli Steadman included it on his song collection "365 Days Of Folk".

American composer Margaret Vance Shelley arranged Blow the Wind Southerly for choir in 1967.

Welsh opera singer Bryn Terfel recorded two versions, first in 2009 accompanied by the London Symphony Orchestra conducted by Barry Wordsworth, with vocal backing by London Voices. In 2013, Terfel recorded another version with the Orchestra at Temple Square conducted by Mack Wilberg.

Sheku Kanneh-Mason recorded an instrumental version on cello in 2019. It was released on his 2020 album Elgar, also on Decca. A music video of Kanneh-Mason performing that version was also released in 2020.

"Blow the Wind Southerly" was recorded by the American quintet Bounding Main and released on their 2005 album Maiden Voyage.

== Lyrics ==
As with all folk music, there are now multiple versions of the lyrics after years of these lyrics being passed down the generations primarily by word of mouth. A common version is:

CHORUS:
Blow the wind southerly, southerly, southerly,
Blow the wind south o'er the bonny blue sea;
Blow the wind southerly, southerly, southerly,
Blow bonnie breeze, my lover to me.

They told me last night there were ships in the offing,
And I hurried down to the deep rolling sea;
But my eye could not see it wherever might be it,
The barque that is bearing my lover to me.

CHORUS

I stood by the lighthouse the last time we parted,
Till darkness came down o'er the deep rolling sea,
And no longer I saw the bright bark (Note: Sources use this alternative (historical) spelling of "barque") of my lover.
Blow, bonny breeze and bring him to me.

CHORUS

Oh, is it not sweet to hear the breeze singing,
As lightly it comes o'er the deep rolling sea?
But sweeter and dearer by far when 'tis bringing,
The barque of my true love in safety to me.

CHORUS

The Ferrier recording does not have the "Oh," at the start of the last verse and changes ""when 'tis" to "'tis when". Also, the Ferrier recording varies the words of the chorus, whereas traditional versions do not; and the Ferrier recording misses out the second of the three verses shown above.
