= William Sutton (songwriter) =

William Sutton was a North East (of England) songwriter/poet of the eighteenth/nineteenth century, possibly born (or living) in Stockton.

According to (Sir) Cuthbert Sharp in his The Bishoprick Garland William Sutton wrote : -

- in praise of Stockton, for 1764 - which also appears in Ritson’s book “Bishopric Garlands”
- a new song for 1764 - which also appears in Rhymes of Northern Bards by John Bell (junior).

== See also ==
- Geordie dialect words
- Cuthbert Sharp
- The Bishoprick Garland 1834 by Sharp
- Rhymes of Northern Bards
- John Bell (junior)
