= Benjamin Pye =

Benjamin Pye LL.D. (1726 – 1808) was Archdeacon of Durham from 1791 to 1808.

Pye was educated at New College, Oxford. He was Rector of Whitburn from 1769 to 1791. He married (and was the second husband of) Elizabeth Bathurst-Sleigh 3rd daughter of Mary, who in turn was the second child of Charles Bathurst, MP for Richmond 1727.

According to (Sir) Cuthbert Sharp in his The Bishoprick Garland Benjamin Pye wrote the second "Stockton's Commendation".

He died on 26 March 1808.

== See also ==
- Geordie dialect words
- Cuthbert Sharp
- The Bishoprick Garland 1834 by Sharp
- List of Archdeacons of Durham
