= Spottee's Cave =

Coordinates: 54°55′33″N 1°22′03″W

Spottee’s Cave is a cave formed in a limestone-magnesium ravine on the seafront of Roker, North East England, between Sunderland (to the south), and Whitburn (to the north).

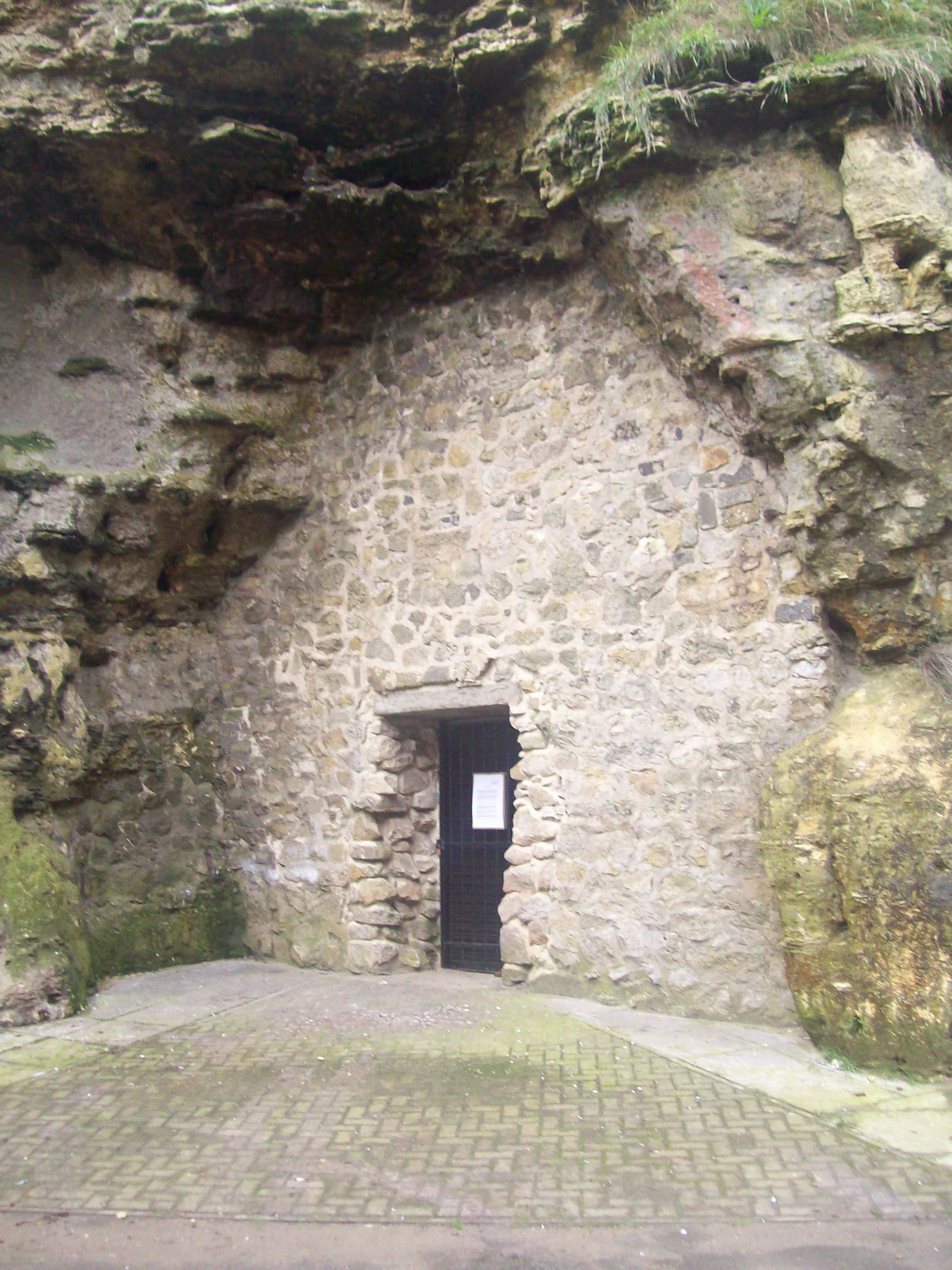
"Spottee's Cave" in Roker Park

== Geology ==
The geology of this area of the Sunderland seafront dates back more than 200 million years to when the first famous 'cannonball' rocks began forming.

The limestone cave has been closed to the public for some time, due to concerns over the safety aspect, but new safety checks reveal that it is probably not as bad as had been first envisaged and the cave hosted a “by invitation only” charity event in January 2012.

It is hoped that this may lead to more similar events, or even permanent re-opening, or as envisaged by the local authority, as a classroom for visiting schools and for other special events.

This area of the seafront (and of Roker itself), which has a rich history, was declared a Conservation Area in 1995 in recognition of its architectural and historic interest.

The cave still retains the name of Spottee’s Cave over two hundred years after he was considered by locals as the “boggle bo” of the children of Sunderland and Whitburn. However the picture shown is not Spottee's cave, it is the entrance to one of the tunnels that goes up to Hylton Castle. Spottee's cave is further into Roker Park by about 10 yards, about 15 feet up the ravine on the left hand side. In the entrance was a small figure, said to be Spottee who was turned to stone by a witch he argued with and was still visible in the entrance up until the late 1970s, now covered by 'rubble' (all figures approximate)

== Legend ==
It gets its name from the stranded foreign sailor who could not speak English, and as he could not converse with the locals, he was thought by some to be a poor lunatic, and is so referred to in The Bishoprick Garland by (Sir) Cuthbert Sharp.

He earned his name “Spottee” from the spotted shirt he wore.

The story (and the lyrics to the song) of Spottee appears in The Bishoprick Garland by (Sir) Cuthbert Sharp.

== Recording ==
A recording of the song is available on YouTube click here

== See also ==
- Geordie dialect words
- Cuthbert Sharp
- The Bishoprick Garland 1834 by Sharp
- Spottee
