= Joseph Crawhall =

Joseph Crawhall may refer to:

- Joseph Crawhall II (1821–1896), English ropemaker, author, and watercolour painter
- Joseph Crawhall III (1861–1913), his son, English artist
