= The Jockeys' Dressing Room at Ascot =

Painting by John Lavery

- Artist: John Lavery
- Year: 1923
- Type: Oil on canvas, genre painting
- Dimensions: 63.5 cm × 81.3 cm (25.0 in × 32.0 in)
- Location: Tate Britain, London

The Jockeys' Dressing Room at Ascot is a 1923 oil painting by the Irish artist John Lavery. It depicts the dressing room for jockeys at Ascot Racecourse in Berkshire. Horseracing-themed paintings enjoyed popular success during the era, notably the work of Alfred Munnings. Lavery chose this deliberately informal setting.

One of the Glasow Boys he had been prominent in the development of British Impressionist. After serving as a war artist by the early 1920s a great deal of work involved portraits although he showed a continued interest in horse racing scenes such as this. The painting was displayed at the Royal Academy Exhibition of 1924 held at Burlington House in London. It was acquired as part of the Chantrey Bequest and now forms part of the collection of the Tate Britain in Pimlico .

== Bibliography ==
- Huggins, Mike. Horseracing and the British, 1919–39 Manchester University Press, 2013.
- Kühnst, Peter. Sports: A Cultural History in the Mirror of Art. Verlag der Kunst, 1996.
- McConkey, Kenneth. Sir John Lavery. Canongate Press, 1993.
