= The Chess Players (Lavery) =

Painting by John Lavery

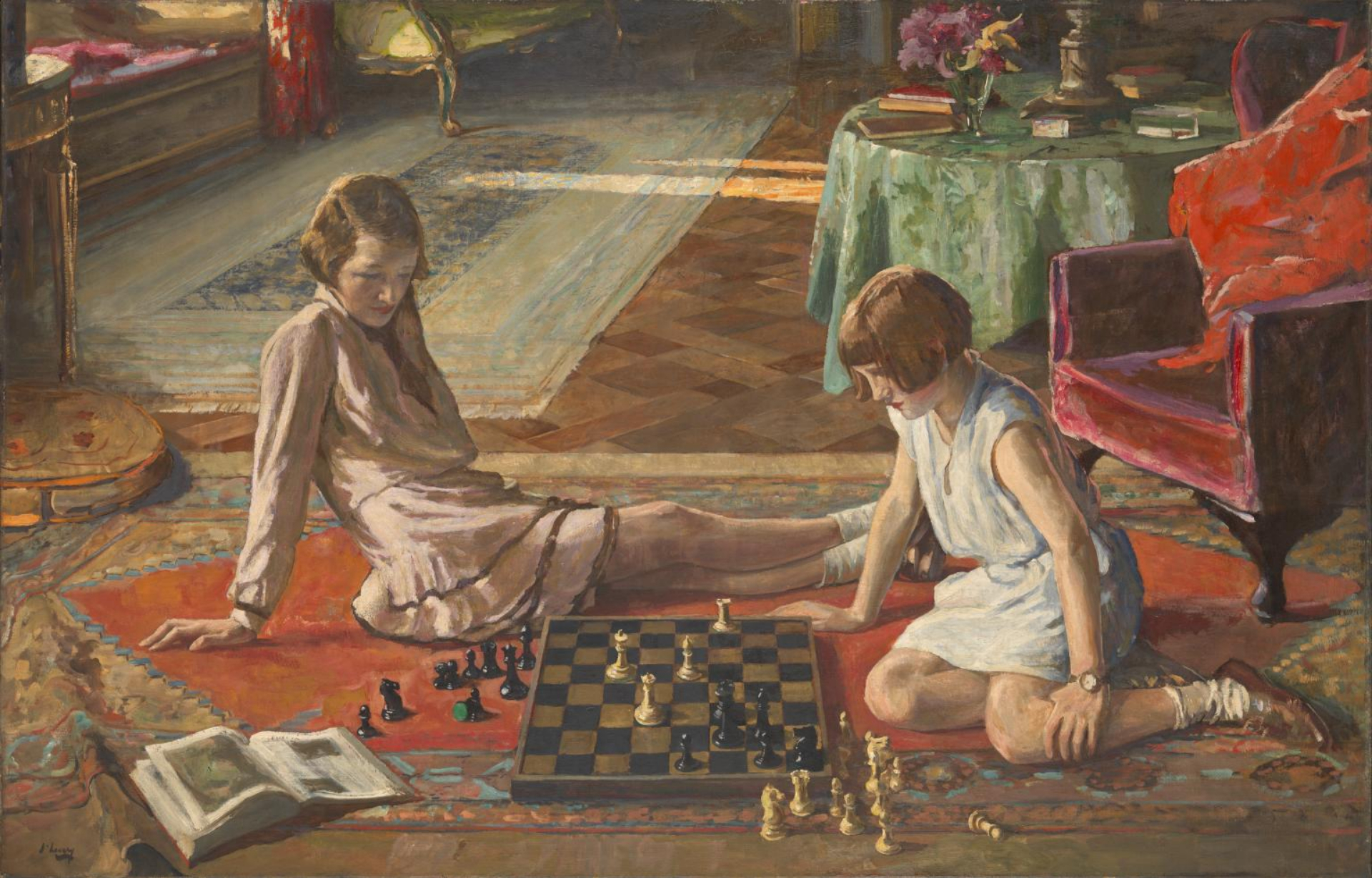
- Artist: John Lavery
- Year: 1929
- Type: Oil on canvas, portrait painting
- Dimensions: 123 cm × 192 cm (48 in × 76 in)
- Location: Tate Britain, London

The Chess Players is a 1929 oil painting by the Irish artist John Lavery. A dual portrait it depicts Margaret and Rosemary, the youngest daughters of Thomas Scott-Ellis, 8th Baron Howard de Walden who are shown playing chess on the floor at the family estate Chirk Castle in North Wales.

Lavery was a noted figure in the British Impressionist tradition. The picture was displayed at the Royal Academy Exhibition of 1930 held at Burlington House in London. It was acquired for the nation the same year through the terms of the Chantrey Bequest and is now in the collection of the Tate Britain.

== Bibliography ==
- Hutchison, Sidney Charles. The History of the Royal Academy 1768-1986. Royce, 1986.
- McConkey, Kenneth. Sir John Lavery R.A., 1856-1941. Ulster Museum, 1984.
