= Margaret Vance Shelley =

American composer and music educator

Margaret Ann (“Peg”) Shelley Vance (30 July 1925 - 18 May 2008) was an American composer and music educator who is best remembered today for her compositions and arrangements for choirs.

Vance was born in Lincoln, Nebraska, to Dora Aldona Kidd and Harold E. Shelley. She married Robert Wesley Vance in 1957 and they had two sons, Robert and Miles. Vance earned degrees from the University of Nebraska and Columbia University Teachers College. She taught music at Chico State College and the University of Portland, where she chaired the Fine Arts Department and served as the interim Dean of Education.

Vance published several collections and series of music for choirs:

- Music for Advancing Choirs
- Music for Young Choirs
- Sacred Music for Treble Voices (with Lee Kjelson)
- Secular Music for Treble Voices (with Lee Kjelson)

Vance's music was published by Belwin (Belwin Mills) and G. Schirmer Inc. Her works for choir include:

- Angelico (Haitian folk song arranged by Vance)
- Billy Boy
- Blow the Wind Southerly (English folk song arranged by Vance)
- Bring a Torch, Jeannette Isabella
- Christmas Folk Song (text by Lizette Woodworth Reese)
- Halleluia Amen
- (The) Holly and the Ivy
- Horo Mhairidu Turn Ye to Me (text by John Wilson; Scottish melody arranged by Vance)
- Hymn to the Night (text by Henry Wadsworth Longfellow)
- I Heard the Bells on Christmas Day (text by Henry Wadsworth Longfellow; music by Johnny Marks; arranged by Lee Kjelson and Vance)
- I Ride an Old Paint
- I Will Give Thanks
- Loch Lomond
- Love the Lord
- March of the Kings - French folk song
- Night Before Christmas (text by Clement Clarke Moore; music by Johnny Marks; arranged by Lee Kjelson and Vance)
- Pretty Saro (Appalachian folk song arranged by Vance)
- Reuben and Rachel
- Ring Around the World (text by Annette Wynne)
