= The Tennis Party =

Painting by John Lavery

- Artist: John Lavery
- Year: 1885
- Type: Oil on canvas, genre painting
- Dimensions: 76.2 cm × 183 cm (30.0 in × 72 in)
- Location: Aberdeen Art Gallery, Aberdeen

The Tennis Party is a 1885 oil painting by the Irish artist John Lavery. A genre painting, it shows a game of tennis played by the fashionable Victorian middle classes. It was the most notable of a number tennis-themed pictures he produced around that time. Lavery was one of the Glasgow Boys, strongly influenced by the development of Impressionism. Lawn tennis had only recently emerged as a popular sport and the inaugural Wimbledon Championship had been held in 1877.

The painting was displayed at the Royal Academy Exhibition of 1885 held at Burlington House in London . It was exhibited again at the Salon of 1888 in Paris where it was awarded a gold medal, marking his breakthrough as a major artist. It was given to Aberdeen Art Gallery in 1926 by the art collectorJames Murray.

== Bibliography ==
- Lake, Robert. A Social History of Tennis in Britain: Taylor & Francis, 2014.
- McConkey, Kenneth. Impressionism in Britain. Yale University Press, 1995.
- Williams, Andrew Gibbon & Brown, Andrew. The Bigger Picture: A History of Scottish Art. BBC Books, 1993.
