= John Carr (writer, born 1722) =

John Carr (1722–1807) was a County Durham born schoolmaster and writer.

Cuthbert Sharp, in his "The Bishoprick Garland” of 1834 and many other sources give the dates as 1732 to 1807 and age 75 at the time of his death

== Early life ==
John Carr LL.D. was born in Muggleswick, County Durham in 1722 (or 1732 - see above).

He was the son of a local farmer and was educated firstly at the village school and privately by the local curate Rev Daniel Watson, then later at St Paul’s School where he remained longer than most as his parents could not afford a place at University.

He became a master at Hertford Grammar School and eventually received a degree of LL.D. from Marischal College, Aberdeen

== Later life ==
He died on 6 June 1807 after an illness lasting almost a year and was buried in St. John’s church, Hertford. On the headstone is an epitaph in Latin, written by himself.

== Family ==
His father and mother were William and Ann Carr. He had a younger brother Joseph, who became the Rev. Joseph Carr who died in Allenheads, Northumberland 27 April 1806 aged 60 years. He also had a brother, William T. Carr, to whom he dedicated a poem in his 1807 edition.

John Carr was married to Mary, but his wife predeceased him, as the memorial plaques All Saints, Hertford records:-

"Beneath this stone is interred the body of Mary Carr, wife of John Carr, of Hertford, LL.D who died 20th Jan 1793, aged 58”. South Panel of the same “Here are deposited the remains of said John Carr, many years Master of the Free Grammar school of this town, who departed this life 6 June 1807, aged 76 yrs”.

== Legacy ==
Possibly his main legacy is his "Translation of Lucian" from ancient Greek language, on which he spent almost 25 years from 1773 to 1798. This was published in 5 volumes. At the time it was considered to be of great importance in the literary world, but this importance has since diminished with the appearance of other more classical translations.

== Other works ==
Dr. Carr considered his other works to be mere trifles on which he set little value. These included :-

- Vol. III of Tristram Shandy – an imitation of the original by Laurence Sterne M.A., 1760
- "Filial Piety" a mock heroic, 1763
- Extract of a Private Letter to a Critic, 1764
- Eponi-na, a Dramatic Essay, addressed to the ladies, 1765
- Ode to the River Derwent – with its 40 verses. This appears in The Bishoprick Garland of 1834 by Sir Cuthbert Sharp

== See also ==
- Geordie dialect words
- Cuthbert Sharp
- The Bishoprick Garland 1834 by Sharp

== Notes ==
Douglas in History of the Baptist Churches in the North of England has further, though contradictory, details of Carr's family.
