= The Bishoprick Garland =

Book by Cuthbert Sharp

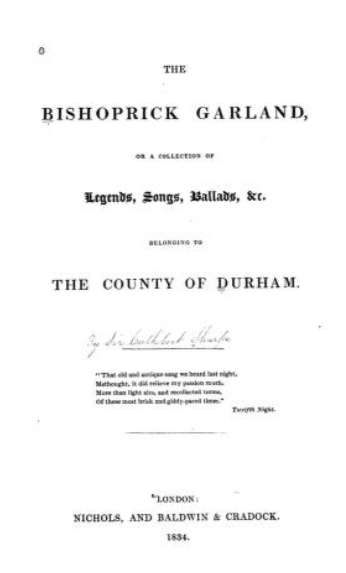
- Title page for The Bishoprick Garland (1834)
- Author: (Sir) Cuthbert Sharp
- Language: English (Geordie dialect)
- Genre: Chapbook
- Publisher: Nichols, and Baldwin & Cradock, London
- Publication date: 1834
- Publication place: United Kingdom
- Media type: Print
- Pages: approx. 90 pages

The Bishoprick Garland is a book compiled by Cuthbert Sharp which gives historical details of people, places and events from the Bishopric of Durham, and was published in 1834.

== Details ==
The Bishoprick Garland – (full title – "The Bishoprick Garland, Or a collection of Legends, Songs, Ballads, &c. Belonging to the County of Durham. [By Sir Cuthbert Sharpe]". London: Nichols, and Baldwin & Cradock. 1834) is a book of approximately 84 pages, giving historical details of people, places, songs, poems and writers pertaining to the North East of England, and in particular the County of Durham or more correctly termed Bishoprick of Durham (using an obsolete spelling of bishopric).

It contains Geordie folk songs (or extracts from) and contains over 150 such song/poem lyric extracts on over 80 pages, and was published in 1834. It was edited by (Sir) Cuthbert Sharp.

== Bibliographical details ==
It is, as the title suggests (this meaning of garland being a collection of short literary pieces, such as ballads or poems; miscellany or anthology), a collection of historical facts from the area of the Bishopric of Durham. There are a surprising large number of entries and biographies, but disappointingly most of the songs/poetry are in the form of extracts, and some biographies are quite short.

The front cover of the book is thus :-

THE
BISHOPRICK GARLAND,
OR A COLLECTION OF
Legends, Songs, Ballads, &c.
BELONGING TO
THE COUNTY OF DURHAM.
[By Sir Cuthbert Sharpe]
"That old and antique song we heard last night,
Methought, it did relieve my passion much,
More than light airs, and recollected terms,
Of these most brisk and giddy-paced times."
Twelfth Night.
LONDON:
NICHOLS, AND BALDWIN & CRADOCK.
1834

== Contents ==
page	title	songwriter	tune	comments	Notes	Ref
vi	Part I – Intro etc.					
vi	Preface					
1	Part II – The Garland					
1	Lamentation on the death of Sir Robert Neville, Lord of Raby, in the year 1282	not given				
1	Bellasyse – Extract	not given				
1	short bio			Bellasyse		
2	Sockburn Worm – fragment of	not given				
2	short bio			Conyers of Sockburn		
3	short bio			The Boar (of Brawn) of Brancepeth		
3	Boar (of Brawn) of Brancepeth (The)	not given				
4	Tempest and Umfreville			Ancient Rhyme		
4	short bio			Brackenbury		
5	Brackenbury – Extract	not given				
5	Brandling – Family Motto	not given				
5	short bio			Brandling		
5	Collingwood – Extract	not given				
5	short bio			Collingwood		
6	Thornton – Extract	not given				
6	short bio			Thornton		
6	Rising of the North (The)	not given		about the Rebellion of 1569,		
7	Percy's Copy	not given				
11	short bio			The Percy Family		
13	Rhyme about Percy – Extract	not given				
14	short bio			about Rookhope Ryde and the Tynedale robbers		
15	Rookhope Ryde	not given		A Durham border song, composed 1569		
21	short bio			The Worme of Lambton		
28	Worme of Lambton (The)	not given		fragment of old rhyme		
30	Dun Cow (The)	not given				
30	short bio			St Cuthbert		
31	Stowpe, Cuddie	not given				
31	short bio			more about St Cuthbert and St Peter of York		
32	Tunstall Rose (The)	not given				
33	Lord Ewrie	not given		written down by Mr. Surtees, of Mainsforth, (communicated by him to Sir Walter Scott), from the recitation of 91-year-old Rose Smith, of Bishop Middleham		
33	short bio			Lord Ewrie		
35	short bio			Pollard of Pollard Hall of Bishop Auckland area		
35	short bio			The Cauld Lad of Hilton		
37	Cauld Lad of Hilton (The) – fragment	not given				
37	Prior of Finkale (The)	not given		Mickleton's, MSS		
37	Ride through Sandgate	not given		fragment of old rhyme about the siege of 1644		
38	mention of			Ride through Sandgate		
38	Barnard Castle Bridge	not given				
38	mention of			Barnard Castle Bridge		
38	Drunken Barnaby	Richard Braithwaite, of Burnishead	Constant Anthony	in Westmorland		
39	TRAGEDIES					
39	short bio	Richard Braithwaite, of Burnishead				
39	epitaph to Frances, his wife (Extract)	Richard Braithwaite, of Burnishead				
39	Barnard Castle Tragedy (The)	not given	Constant Anthony	given in Ritson's Garland		
39	Barnaby, Barnaby – a fragment	not given				
40	Tragedy of Bowes (The)	Mallet				
41	Sir Henry Vane, The Younger	not given				
41	Sonnet to Vane	John Milton				
41	mention of			The Pelton Brag		
43	Pelton Lonin	traditional				
43	River Derwent (Ode to the)	John Carr		40 verses in total		
43	short bio	John Carr				
47	short bio	Jane Frizzle				
48	Elsie Marley		to its own tune	An Alewife of Picktree near Chester-le-Street		
48	short bio	George Maddison		an under-secretary of state		
48	short bio	Elsie Marley				
50	Spottee	possibly Thomas Clerke		of Sunderland		
50	short bio	Thomas Clerke				
50	'Tis all that I desire (actual title unknown)	Thomas Clerke		a fragment only		
51	short bio	Spottee				
51	short bio	Spottee's Cave		geographical		
52	Collier's Rant (The)	unknown		refers to singing by W. S--- (sen) of Picktree		
54	Bonny Pit Laddie (The)	not given				
54	Bobby Shaftoe	Traditional				
54	Bonny Pit Laddie (The) – additional verse	not given				
55	Water of Tyne (The)	not given				
55	Bobby Shaftoe – more verses	Traditional				
55	short bio			The Water of Tyne		
55	Water of Tyne (The)	not given		a continuation		
56	(Weel May) The Keel Row	not given				
56	continuation of short bio			The Water of Tyne		
56	short bio			Sandgate (from The Keel Row)		
57	Langley Dale	not given				
57	(Weel May) The Keel Row – more verses	not given				
57	(Weel May) The Keel Row – another added verse	not given		specifically to "Sir Matthew White Ridley"		
58	short bio			Sword Dancers		
58	Sword Dancers Song (title unknown)	not given				
63	details of			John Fenwick's the flower amang them		
63	Stockton's Commendation (number one)	not given	Sir John Fenwick's the flower amang them			
63	New Song (A) – for the Year 1764	Mr William Sutton				
63	Stockton's Commendation (number two)	Benjamin Poye		L.L.D. & Archdeacon of Durham		
64	in praise of Stockton, for 1764 (mention only	Mr William Sutton	Derry down	in Ritson's "Bishopric Garland."		
64	Christmas Day in the Morning	Traditional Carol				
65	Pitman's Love Song (A)	not given				
65	Christmas Day in the Morning (continued)	Traditional Carol				
65	Yule sits upon yule clog (title unknown)	not given				
65	Picking of lilies the other day, I saw a ship sailing on the main (actual title unknown)	attributed to K		dictated by Mr. George Wood, Bridge Street, Bishopwearmouth		
66	Pitman's Love Song (A) – (continued)	not given				
66	Up The Raw	not given				
67	Pleasures of Sunderland (The)	not given				
67	My bairn's a bonny bairn	a nursery song				
67	All the neet ower and ower	a nursery song				
67	A hen's a hungry dish	a nursery song				
68	Ship is all laden (The)	not given				
69	Forget thee, Canny Sunderland, No !	Sir Walter Scott		October 1827		
69	brief history of			Shipping Trade at the time		
70	Sair Fail'd, Hinney	not given		Variation on "The awd man to the oak tree"		
70	How should I know your true love (actual title unknown)	not given				
70	Joy from my Nancy (possible title)	Robert Emery				
70	If he comes to Sunderland Pier	a local song		only one verse survives		
70	Old Man and the Oak (The)	not given	Variation on "Sair Fail'd, Hinney"	from Ritson, in Gammer Gurton's Garland		
71	Sair Fail'd, Hinney (Continued)	not given				
71	South Shields Song (A)	not given		of the Sailors		
71	Blow the Wind Southerly – (a variation)	unknown		Sunderland Sailors' Rhymes		
71	Wee'll all away to Sunniside	not given		A Sunderland Song		
71	Wee'll sit upon the Pier till the tide comes in	not given		A Sunderland Song		
72	Sunderland Bridge	M W of North Shields			B W1	
72	short bio	Rowland Burdon M.P				
73	Part III – Sayings belonging to the Bishoprick	not given				
73	Evenwood	not given				
73	Mainsforth	not given				
74	Darnton Trod	not given				
74	Far Travell'd	not given				
74	Runaway Doctor Bokanki	sURTEES				
75	Part IV – Epitaphs	not given				
75	Garlands	not given				
75	John Lilburn	not given				
76	Trollop	not given		Architect of the Exchange at Newcastle		
76	Cooper	not given				
76	Gentle John	not given				
76	Barnabus Hutchinson	not given		Proctor at Durham, and died 18 March 1634		
77	Lively	not given				
77	Wife of a respectable Bookseller, of Sunderland (The)	not given		Cunningham's MSS		
77	Nevill and Evers	not given				
78	A Grace – Lady D'arcy	not given				
79	Sir John-Le-Spring	not given				
81	Part V – Appendix					
81	Collingwood (arms)			see page 5		
81	Thornton					
82	Hiltons (The)			Adam de Hilton lived in the time of king Athelstan		
84	Finis					
84	Printed by Marwood & Co. Sunderland.					

== Notes ==
- B W1 – according to Bell's – Rhymes of Northern Bards 1812, the writer is M W of North Shields
