= Spottee =

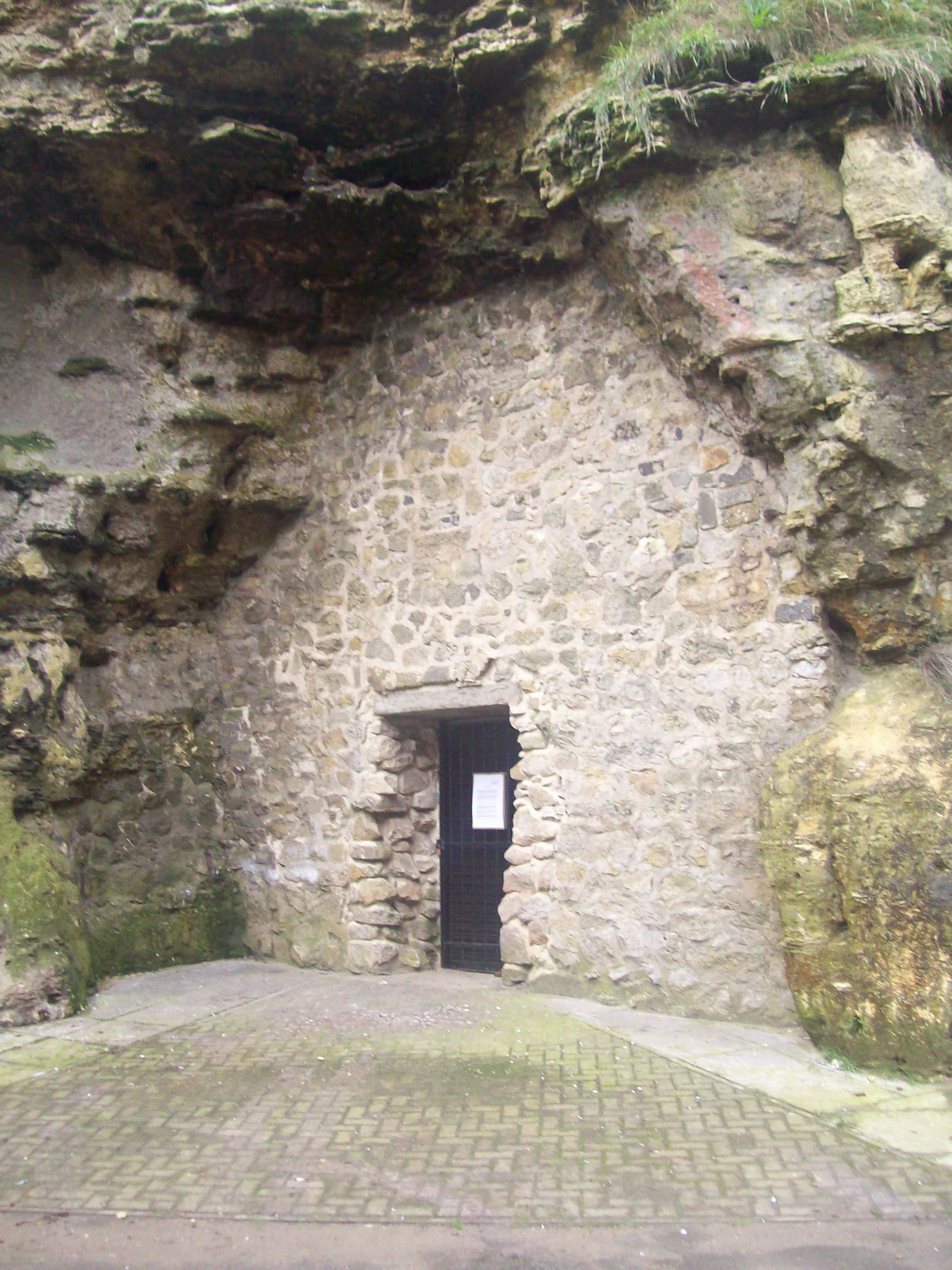
"Spottee's Cave" in Roker Park

Spottee was a character from the eighteenth century, thought to be a stranded French sailor, who after living rough and begging, found a Sea cave, north of the River Wear estuary, to the north of Sunderland, and which he made his home.

== Legend ==
Some rumours say that he was thought to be a stranded foreign sailor (some say French) who could not speak English. Other tales tell of his ship being wrecked on the rocks along the Roker coast and as he couldn't afford to rebuild it he became, in effect, shipwrecked. As he could not speak the language he could not converse with the locals, Spottee was thought by some to be a poor lunatic, and is so referred to in The Bishoprick Garland by (Sir) Cuthbert Sharp.

He earned his name from the spotted shirt he wore. He set up his home in a cave, which eventually bore his name, becoming Spottee’s Cave. He earned his living by begging and doing odd jobs for local farmers.

Rumour has it that he eventually died in the cave and his ghost has been spotted on stormy nights warning ships to stay away from the rocks, or alternatively that he (and now his ghost) lured ships onto the rocks and that his cave was a place of evil. The cave still retains the name of Spottee’s Cave over two hundred years after he was considered by locals as the “boggle bo” of the children of Sunderland and Whitburn.

The story of Spottee appears in The Bishoprick Garland by (Sir) Cuthbert Sharp.

== Recording ==
A recording of the song is available on YouTube here

== See also ==
- Geordie dialect words
- Cuthbert Sharp
- The Bishoprick Garland 1834 by Sharp
- Spottee’s Cave
