= Scottish Built Ships database =

The Scottish Built Ships database is a free-to-use record of over 35,000 ships built in Scotland. It was renamed from the "Clyde Built Ships" database when its scope was extended to cover the whole country's ship and boatbuilders.

With a standard format, the extent of information varies from ship to ship, and additional information is being continually added by a team of voluntary editors. The records can be easily searched from a search page.
