= Joseph Crawhall II =

Joseph Crawhall II (1821–1896) was born at West House, Newcastle. He was a ropemaker, writer, and watercolour painter.

== Life ==
Crawhall, like his father (also Joseph), a Newcastle ropemaker, was interested in writing and watercolour painting. He went on to produce many books, illustrated by himself. His first (printed by himself in 1859) was entitled The Compleatest Angling Booke That Ever was Writ. The second edition (printed in 1881) contained illustrations from his son, Joseph Crawhall and James Guthrie (1859–1930).

Crawhall was a friend of Charles Keene (1823–1891), illustrator of Punch, and they worked together for over 200 drawings for the journal. There are 21 albums of these drawings in the Kelvingrove Art Gallery and Museum in Glasgow.

Beyond his work as a writer and artist, Crawhall was also involved in a wide range of activities, including business, book design, art patronage, antiquarian collecting, architectural preservation, wood engraving, and angling. In 1880, he became secretary of the Newcastle Arts Association.

In his role as a collector of antiquities he published A Beuk o’ Newcassell Sangs Collected by Joseph Crawhall in 1888. It too was a pictorial book, giving in this case, the lyrics of the songs, in many cases the actual music, and all beautifully illustrated using his woodcuts.

Crawhall's A pictorial archive of quaint cuts in the chap book style was published by Dover Press (now long out of print) is a collection of woodcuts.

== Family ==
His grandfather Thomas had married his grandmother Ann (née Bownas) at Allendale in 1771. They lived at Allendale, where Thomas was chief agent for Beaumonts lead mines, and there they raised twelve children.

His father, Joseph I (1793–1853) was an artist as well as a respected Newcastle business man, and an artist. His brother George Edward and sister Mary also showed artistic talent. Another sister Jane Anne was the mother of Abel Chapman, the naturalist writer and artist.

He was the father of Joseph Crawhall III.

== See also ==
Geordie dialect words
A Beuk o’ Newcassell Sangs Collected by Joseph Crawhall 1888
