= Cuthbert Sharp =

English soldier, official and antiquary

Sir Cuthbert Sharp (1781–1849) was an English soldier, official and antiquary.

== Life ==
The son of Cuthbert Sharp and of Susannah (sister of Brass Crosby), Sharp was an English soldier, official, and shipbuilder. He was born at Hartlepool, County Durham, England in 1781, and received his education at Greenwich under Charles Burney. There he formed a lasting friendship with Lord Lake and with Sir Edward Blakeney. When he was eighteen years old he served in Ireland during the rebellion as an officer in the fencible cavalry, a British regiment.

When his regiment was disbanded, Sharp went to Edinburgh, and in 1803 visited Paris. There he was stranded by the resumption of hostilities at the conclusion of the Peace of Amiens, and detained, with other English visitors, as a prisoner of war. But by the influence of Claude Ambroise Régnier, the Minister of Justice, whom he knew, he was released on parole, and after a few years was allowed to leave for England.

Sharp settled at Hartlepool and married Elizabeth Croudace, and took up the study of local antiquities. In 1816 he acted as mayor, and was knighted on the occasion of a visit of the Prince Regent. In 1823 Sharp was appointed collector of customs at Sunderland. In 1845 he was promoted to the post of collector of customs at Newcastle-on-Tyne, where he resided until his death on 17 August 1849.

While in Sunderland, Sharp became a joining member of The Sea Captains Lodge in 1824, which changed its name to Palatine Lodge No 97 in 1830. He became Worshipful Master of the Lodge in 1827,1828,1834 and 1837 and was appointed as the Right Worshipful Deputy Provincial Grand Master of the Province of Durham in 1832.

== Works ==
In 1816 appeared his first book, The History of Hartlepool (2nd ed. 1851), which made his reputation as an antiquarian. Sharp came to know Robert Surtees, the historian of County Durham, and helped him with local genealogies. His contributions to Surtees's History of Durham were distinguished by the initials C. S. surmounted by a rose. In 1840 appeared his Memorials of the Rebellion of 1569, based on the Bowes Manuscripts.

Other works of his include:

- 'A Brief Summary of a Manuscript formerly belonging to Lord William Howard,’ 1819.
- 'Excerpta Memorabilia e Registris Parochialibus Com. Pal. Dunelm.' in three parts, 1819, 1825, 1841; published in one volume in 1841.
- 'A List of the Knights and Burgesses who have represented the County and City of Durham in Parliament,’ Durham 1826; 2nd ed. Sunderland, 1833.
- 'Poems,’ Sunderland, 1828.
- 'The Life of Ambrose Barnes, sometime Alderman of Newcastle,’ 1828.
- 'The Worme of Lambton,’ a legend, 1830.
- ‘The Bishoprick Garland. 1834

He also compiled a Catalogue of his manuscripts, 1829.

== See also ==
- Geordie dialect words
- The Bishoprick Garland 1834 by Sharp
