= Carleson (disambiguation) =

Carleson may refer to:

== Mathematics ==
- Carleson measure, a mathematical method applied to dimensional space
- Carleson's inequality, a generalisation of Carleman's inequality
- Carleson–Jacobs theorem, a function applied to the unit of a circle

== People ==
- Carleson, a Swedish surname

== See also ==
- Charleson
