= Charleton (name) =

Charleton is a given name or surname. Notable people with the name include:

== Given name ==
- Charlton Hunt (1801–1836), also spelled Charleton, American lawyer and politician

== Surname ==
- Brent Charleton (born 1982), Canadian basketball player
- Buddy Charleton (1938–2011), American musician
- Henry Charleton (1870–1959), British politician
- Peter Charleton (born 1956), Irish judge
- Rice Charleton (1710–1789), English physician and researcher
- Robert Charleton (1809–1872), Quaker manufacturer and philanthropist
- Robert Charleton (judge) (died 1395/6), English judge
- Walter Charleton (1619–1707), English writer

== Middle name ==
- George Charleton Barron (c. 1846–1891), English entertainer

== See also ==
- Lewis de Charleton (died 1369), medieval bishop of Hereford
- Carleton (given name)
- Charleson
- Charleston (name)
- Charlton (given name)
