= Carleson =

Carleson is a Swedish patronymic surname. Notable people with the surname include:

- C. N. Carleson (1865–1929), Swedish politician
- Edvard Carleson (1820–1884), Swedish politician
- Lennart Carleson (born 1928), Swedish mathematician
- Per Carleson (1917–2004), Swedish fencer
- Robert B. Carleson (1931–2006), American presidential advisor

== See also ==
- Carlson
