= William Dunbar (songwriter) =

William Dunbar (1852 (or 1853) – 1874) was a Gateshead songwriting collier who died at the age of 21.

== Life ==
William Dunbar was born in 1852 (or 1853) at Wardley Colliery, near Gateshead.

He started work as an apprentice to a Mr Romanis, a Gateshead painter and glazier, but had a restless nature and in a very short time changed trade to work as a cartwright or wainwright, working in Felling and then, for the rest of his short life, as a coal miner working in the coal pits.

Dunbar engaged in various forms of art, including songwriting, performance, and comedy; writing for John W Chater's "Keelmin's comic annewal" and other competitions, winning several awards. Later, Dunbar also produced a book of over 40 pages (published by Stevenson and Dryden of Newcastle) containing his own songs, mostly songs which had been previously included in John W Chater's books, periodicals and chapbooks and which appeared in print in 1874, after his death.

Dunbar died on 23 February 1874 at age 21. A favourite of the publisher, John W Chater, many tributes emerged in Chater-owned outlets.

== Works ==
These include :-

- Best way to feel for a man, sung to the tune of 'Wait for the turn of the tide'. It is a Motto Song (i.e. a song with suggestive expression of a guiding principle; a maxim) moralising and giving advice on how men should take care of those less fortunate.
- Billy Baker, sung to the tune of “The Handsome Page”. It is a Comic song about a local fictional character.
- Comic medley, sung to the tune of “Who's for the bus”. It is a Comic song about a local fictional character
- Deeth o' Jimmy Renforth, sung to the tune of “Castles in the air”. It is a song about the death of famous local rower Jimmy Renforth
- Doing all things for the best, sung to the tune of “Take care of the peace”. It is a Motto Song stressing the importance of being fair to others, with a few religious undertones
- Don't take offence, sung to the tune of “Act on the square”. It is a Motto Song saying don't take offence and laugh at yourself gracefully
- Forester's song, sung to the tune of “Oxford Joe”. It is a song written specifically for a concert for the Ancient Order of Foresters at Wrekenton in 1872
- Geordy's pay, sung to the tune of “Barbara Bell”. It is a song discussing wages and expenses
- If ivvor aw cease te speak, sung to the tune of “If I ever cease to love”. It is a song parodying If I ever cease to love
- Imitation, sung to the tune of “Just to show there's no ill feeling”. It is a Motto Song expressing the dangers of imitation
- Joe the barber's boy, sung to the tune of “Imensicoff”. It is a comic song about a barber’s apprentice
- Joseph Arch, sung to the tune of “The Marble Arch”. It is a song about Joseph Arch, on the president of the newly founded National Agricultural Labourers' Union
- Maw bonny Bess. (or A dog fancier's musings) is a song about his racing dog
- My A B C (or items alphabetically arranged), sung to the tune of “Bow, Wow, Wow”. It is a comic song about a barber’s apprentice
- North Durham election, 1874. A dialogue between Tommy Stobbs and Sally is a comic song about a husband and wife’s different opinions of the candidates
- Nothing venture, nothing win, sung to the tune of “Par excellence”. It is a comic song about a barber’s apprentice
- Nowt se Queer as Foaks, sung to the tune of “Castles in the Air”. It is a comic song in dialect about ordinary “Foalks
- Playing the troon, sung to the tune of “A t'yel wiv a seekwil, an' monny an eekwil”. It is a comic song in dialect about wishing he'd attended school regularly
- Pull that wins the day, sung to the tune of “Pull, pull together, boys”. It is a Motto song telling of the importance in sticking together
- Robin Ramsay; or, what aw'm puzzled wi', sung to the tune of “The whole hog or none”. It is a comic song in the Geordie dialect
- She greets me wiv a smile, sung to the tune of “I am so volatile”. It is a comic song about family life
- The shiftin’ is a comic song about pretending to move house to escape the debt collector
- The Wardley Band, sung to the tune of “The pawnshop bleezin”. It is a song specially written for a concert in aid of the Wardley Brass Band, held on 31 January 1874 (less than a month before William Dunbar died)
- We hevvent lang te be sober noo, sung to the tune of “I wish I was a fish”. It is a comic song about the impending arrival of pay day
- The Wellesley lads, sung to the tune of “Imminsicoff”. It is a song in praise of one of the first schools set up to train sailors, at Wellesley on Tyneside in 1868
- We're seldom what we shud be, sung to the tune of “The country cousin”. It is a song originally printed in John W Chater's Diary and Local Remembrancer
- Woman charmin' woman O, sung to the tune of “Try, try again”. It is a song originally printed in John W Chater's Diary and Local Remembrancer
- Would you like to see, sung to the tune of “Down among the coals”. It is a song originally printed in John W Chater's Diary and Local Remembrancer

== See also ==
Geordie dialect words
Dunbar's local songs and recitations 1874
Thomas Allan
Allan's Illustrated Edition of Tyneside Songs and Readings
Chater's Canny Newcassel Diary and Remembrancer 1872
