= Charleston (name) =

Charleston is a given name and a surname.

== Given name ==
- Charleston Rambo, American gridiron football player
- Charleston Hughes (born 1983), American gridiron football player

== Surname ==
- Allan Charleston (1934–2015), Australian water polo player
- Anne Charleston (born 1942), Australian-born actress
- Aub Charleston (1901–1985), Australian rules footballer
- Bennie Charleston (1907–1988), American Negro league baseball player
- Craig Charleston (born 1970), Scottish football referee
- David Charleston (1848–1934), Cornish-born Australian politician
- Elizabeth Charleston (1819–1997), American painter
- Fernando Charleston Hernández (born 1976), Mexican politician
- Jeff Charleston (born 1983), American gridiron football player
- Mary Charleston, Australian choreographer and actress
- Oscar Charleston (1896–1954), American Negro league baseball player
- Peter Charleston (born 1930), Australian rules footballer
- Porter Charleston (1904–1986), American Negro league player
- Reagan Charleston (born 1988), American jewelry designer, lawyer and reality television personality
- Red Charleston, American Negro league player
- Rondi Charleston, American jazz vocalist and songwriter
- Steven Charleston (born 1949), American bishop and academic

== See also ==
- Carlston (name)
- Charleson
- Charleston (disambiguation)
- Charleton (name)
- Charlestown (disambiguation)
