= Robert Elliott (songwriter) =

Robert Elliott was a mid to late 19th century miner and poet. He was from Choppington, Northumberland.

Elliott also published a small 48 page chapbook of his works "Poems and Recitations by R Elliott" published by Richardson and Fenton, of Bedlington, Northumberland in 1877.

He has written several works including :-

- "A Pitman gawn te Parliament" about the former pit-man, and by then M.P. Thomas Burt. This work appears on page 571 of Thomas Allan's Illustrated Edition of Tyneside Songs and Readings and on page 32 of Elliotts own book "poems and recitations"
- "A Pitman in Parliament" also about Thomas Burt, this work is in answer to the accusations of extravagance, champagne and other costly expenses made against members of parliament several years previous, stating that “our” M.P. was hard working. This song also appears on page 571 of Allan’s book and on page 36 of Elliotts book
- A short bio of Robert Elliott also appears on page 571 of Allan’s work.
- “A Pitman's Trubles”, Song about the woes of a pitman, unhappy at work, a problem made worse by his wife’s drinking. This song appears on page 90 of John W Chater’s Canny Newcassel Diary and Remembrancer
- “The drunkard” appears in Elliott’s book
- “On visiting” appears in Elliott’s book

== See also ==
- Geordie dialect words
- Thomas Allan
- Allan's Illustrated Edition of Tyneside Songs and Readings
- John W Chater
- Chater's Canny Newcassel Diary and Remembrancer 1872
