= Keelmin's Comic Annewal =

Book by John W. Chater

The Keelmin's Comic Annewal, for (followed by the actual year)
- Author: John W. Chater
- Language: English, many in (Geordie dialect)
- Genre: annual – book
- Publisher: John W. Chater
- Publication date: between (at least) 1869 and 1883
- Publication place: United Kingdom
- Media type: Print
- Pages: varies but generally less than 50 pages

The Keelmin's Comic Annewal, for 1869 was a book, published and printed annually by John W. Chater, between (at least) 1869 and 1883. It contained a mixture of songs, poems, humorous tales, jokes, conundrums, tongue twisters and other items of frivolity.

The full title of the book was “The Keelmin's Comic Annewal, for 1869, gi'es ye the best bits o' wit an' wisdim, be the clivvorest cheps aboot Tyneside; Awl M'yed Oot O' Thor Awn Heeds, An 'Lustrayted Wi' Lots Iv Curius An' Clivvor Comic Cuts.Be J. L. Marcke an' C. H. Ross,(B'yeth Reg'lae Cawshins.) Price Sixpence – Reddy Munny------------(followed by 7 rules te buyers)------------J. W. Chater, 89, Clayton Street, Newcastle-upon-Tyne”

A copy of most years books are now held at Beamish Museum.

== The publication ==
The front cover is as thus :-

THE
KEELMIN'S COMIC
ANNEWAL,
FOR 1869
GI'ES YE
THE BEST BITS O' WIT AN' WISDIM
BE THE CLIVVOREST CHEPS ABOOT TYNESIDE;
AWL M'YED OOT O' THOR AWN HEEDS,
AN 'LUSTRAYTED WI'
LOTS IV CURIUS AN' CLIVVOR COMIC CUTS.
BE
J. L. MARCKE AN' C. H. ROSS,
(B'YETH REG'LAE CAWSHINS.)
PRICE SIXPENCE – REDDY MUNNY
– - – - – - –
RULES TE BUYERS
– - – - – - –
J. W. CHATER, 89, CLAYTON STREET
Newcastle-upon-Tyne

The cost of the publication was “Price sixpence- Reddy Munny

== Contents ==
The contents cover many topics, mainly written in the Geordie dialect, often very broad.

Below is a small sample of the type of items these annuals contained :-

=== Songs ===
- Awd Grey Meer – (The), to the tune of The Pladdie awa (1873 annual)
- Bellman's penshun, to the tune of Bow, wow, wow (1873 annual)
- Bobbies and the claes line – (The) or the weshorwives' rivvenge, to the tune of Weshorwife or Man i' the m'yun (1869 annual)
- Dispairin' K'yuk O' Howdin – (The) (1869 annual)
- Drop ahint the door – (A), to the tune of Yen kiss ahint the door (1873 annual)
- Fortniths Wages Weekly – (A), to the tune of King o' the Cannibal Islands, written by Ralph Blackett, (1871 annual)
- Gannin' te the well, to the tune of Awd lang syne (1873 annual)
- Geordy Black, written by Rowland Harrison, (1873 annual)
- Janey Grey, to the tune of Robin Thomsin's smiddy (1869 annual)
- Jimmy's brocken oot, to the tune of Row upon the stairs, written by Thomas Kerr, (1871 annual)
- Midhap – (A) or After Tom Hood – A long way (1873 annual)
- Nowt like a hoose o' yer awn, written by Rowland Harrison, (1873 annual)
- Penny show peep – (The), to the tune of Canny Newcassel (1873 annual)
- Pitman and the quack – (The) – (1873 annual)
- Shields forinor – (The) (Founded on facts), to the tune of Charmin young widow (1873 annual)
- Since aw hev been away, to the tune of An' sae will we yit, written by John Kelday Smith, (1871 annual)
- Thro' havin' nowt te de!, written by Joe Wilson, (1869 annual)
- When will they get it D'yun, to the tune of Ne luck aboot the hoose (1873 annual)
- Ye Knaw! Ye See, to the tune of The Railway Guard, written by Joe Wilson, (1873 annual)

=== Example of riddles (1873 annual) ===
- What local name puts you in mind of Highland Firs? – Scotswood
- Why is a Circus Proprietor like a Clergyman at a wedding? – Neither can perform without a ring

== See also ==
- Geordie dialect words
- John W. Chater
- Chater’s Annual – a yearbook published between 1861-1882
- Chater's Canny Newcassel Diary and Remembrancer 1872
