= Riding Up Front =

American non-profit organization

Riding Up Front (RUF)
- Type: 501(c)(3) organization
- Founded: California in March, 2017
- Founder: Wei-En Tan
- Website: www.ridingupfront.org

Riding Up Front (RUF), Inc. is a California-based non-profit 501(c)(3) supporting immigrant rights founded by Wei-En Tan, Ph.D., who is an immigrant to the United States. In March 2017, RUF launched the RUF Art Blog Project, an ongoing collection of stories from Uber, Lyft, and Taxi passengers and drivers illustrated in collaboration with artists from around the world. The art blog also collects donations to support nonprofits doing work for immigrant populations such as the ACLU, the American Immigration Council and the International Rescue Committee.

== Origins ==
Riding Up Front was originally a personal blog of Tan's that aimed to record memorable conversations she had with her Uber, Lyft and Taxi drivers during business trips. Following the 2016 American elections, Tan realized there was a growing animosity toward immigrants largely fueled by a lack of understanding. In January 2016, the President Trump issued the travel ban. Consequently, Tan and Dr. Anais Rameau, RUF Board Chair, decided to expand the personal blog into a community-driven creative project in hope to humanize immigrants in light of the current political climate, both in the U.S. and worldwide.

== Team ==
Wei-En Tan, Ph.D. - founder and Executive Director, also founder and President, COO at the AI company Visla Labs.

Anaïs Rameau, M.D. - Board Chair, Laryngologist Surgeon at Cornell Weill Medicine in NYC, of French-Iranian background.

Mark Argyle - Curator, web content designer, editor and copywriter from Melbourne, Australia.

Kevin Quennesson - Creative Director, also AI and ML leader at Twitter, entrepreneur and engineer originally from France.

Martha Rodriguez Clavell, J.D. - Communications Director, the youngest board member of the ACLU in Miami and born in Havana, Cuba.

Latasha James – Outreach Manager, social media professional living in Detroit, Michigan.

== Development ==
Riding Up Front is actively seeking more artwork and stories from worldwide, and encourages building a community based on sharing stories and art. Stories are curated by the RUF founding volunteer team who share the experience of immigration or as refugees. The participating artists get to choose the style they work best with. Each story is about a connection made between the driver and passenger, regardless of race, religion, or gender.
