= Corona theorem =

In mathematics, the corona theorem is a result about the spectrum of the bounded holomorphic functions on the open unit disc, conjectured by Kakutani (1941) and proved by Lennart Carleson (1962).

The commutative Banach algebra and Hardy space H^{∞} consists of the bounded holomorphic functions on the open unit disc D. Its spectrum S (the closed maximal ideals) contains D as an open subspace because for each z in D there is a maximal ideal consisting of functions f with

f(z) = 0.

The subspace D cannot make up the entire spectrum S, essentially because the spectrum is a compact space and D is not. The complement of the closure of D in S was called the corona by Newman (1959), and the corona theorem states that the corona is empty, or in other words the open unit disc D is dense in the spectrum. A more elementary formulation is that elements f_{1},...,f_{n} generate the unit ideal of H^{∞} if and only if there is some δ>0 such that

$|f_1|+\cdots+|f_n|\ge\delta$ everywhere in the unit ball.

Newman showed that the corona theorem can be reduced to an interpolation problem, which was then proved by Carleson.

In 1979 Thomas Wolff gave a simplified (but unpublished) proof of the corona theorem, described in (Koosis 1980) and (Gamelin 1980).

Cole later showed that this result cannot be extended to all open Riemann surfaces (Gamelin 1978).

As a by-product, of Carleson's work, the Carleson measure was introduced which itself is a very useful tool in modern function theory. It remains an open question whether there are versions of the corona theorem for every planar domain or for higher-dimensional domains.

Note that if one assumes the continuity up to the boundary in the corona theorem, then the conclusion follows easily from the theory of commutative Banach algebra (Rudin 1991).

== See also ==
- Corona set
