= James Anderson (songwriter, born 1825) =

English songwriter

James Anderson (1825 – 14 March 1899) was an English, Tyneside miner/songwriter of the late 19th century. He was quite famous locally at the time, and his most popular song is probably "Aw wish Pay Friday wad cum".

== Details ==
Mr James Anderson was born in 1825 in Earsdon and followed his father into the coal mines. At one stage he was "lamp-man" at Elswick Colliery, a position which he held for 20 years.

His songs won many prizes in the local competitions, such as the one held by John W Chater and those run by the Weekly Chronicle. He had much of his material published in 'Chater's Tyneside Comic Annuals' and other publications.

It would appear that at the time of his writings, James Anderson was as well known and popular as Joe Wilson, although his popularity has not endured anywhere near as much.

His song "Aw wish Pay Friday wad cum" was awarded first prize in the Weekly Chronicle song competition of 1870, beating some 176 competitors including Joe Wilson's entry of "Wor Geordy's Local Hist'ry". After the publication of the song the author became known as 'Pay Friday Jim'

John Fraser, the local printer, stationer, bookbinder, newsagent, writer and publisher (of, among other things, The Blyth & Tyneside Comic Almanack), published in 1898 a collection of James' Anderson's songs and poems entitled "Collection of Blyth and Tyneside Poems & Songs”

James Anderson died after a long illness at his home in Cowpen Quay, Blyth, Northumberland, on 14 March 1899, he was 73.

== Works ==
These include :-

1. Collection
- Collection of Blyth and Tyneside Poems & Songs" written by James Anderson printed by J. Fraser [pref., 1898 (126 pages)
1. Individual songs/poems
- Aa wunder what canny aad Blyth 'll say noo
- Another Song in answer to James Armstrong
- At Heddon-on-the-Wall
- Aud Billy Henderson's wonderful coat, sung to the tune of Cappy's, the Dog
- Aw wish pay Friday wad cum, sung to the tune of Aw wish yor muther wud cum. This song was awarded first prize in the Newcastle Weekly Chronicle song competition of 1870, beating some 176 competitors including Joe Wilson. After the publication of the song the author became known as "Pay Friday Jim"
- Aw wish that time wad cum, sung to the tune of John Anderson, my Joe
- Aw'll buy ne mair butter o' Paddison's wife, sung to the tune of Laird o' Cockpen
- Aw'll nivor gan drinkin' i' Blyth onny mair, sung to the tune of Laird o' Cockpen
- Be kind te yer wife
- Blyth sailor's farewell, sung to the tune of Laird o' Cockpen.
- Bonny banks of o' Tyne
- Bonny bright eyed Mary
- Bonny Throckley Fell
- Clocks at the Central Station – (The)
- Four Seasons – (The)
- Friendship's Smile
- Half the lees they tell isn't true
- High price o' coals; or, Peggy's lament
- Honest workin' man
- Jack an' Nan
- Jennie and Jemmie, a parody on the song 'When ye gang awa, Jemmie'
- John Bryson, the Miners' Best Friend
- Late Mr James Bonner – (The)
- Local Poet's Lament for Jos Chater – (The)
- Man, know Thyself
- Mary on the Banks of Tyne
- Me fethur's drunk ag'yen – appeared in John W Chater's Canny Newcassel Diary and Remembrancer
- Miseries of man
- Music
- My little favourite Pink Flower
- My Residence in Blyth
- My Sweet Little Home by the Sea
- Northumberland miners' strike, 1876
- Rural Retreat – (A)
- Sally and Bobby, sung to the tune of Cappy's, the Dog
- Sally and Sam
- Smiling Face – (A)
- Thor's queer folks noo o' days
- Toast, On taking a friendly Glass of Beer – (A), awarded first prize in a competition.
- Tortoise-shell tom cat
- Town of Old Hexham – (The)
- True Manhood
- Walbottle Dene, sung to the tune of John Anderson, my Joe
- Warm fireside (A) – appeared in John W Chater's Canny Newcassel Diary and Remembrancer
- What did aw get married for?, sung to the tune of Green grows the rashes o
- What is Love
- Wor Bonny Pit Lad

== See also ==
Geordie dialect words
John W Chater
Chater's Canny Newcassel Diary and Remembrancer 1872
