= Charleson =

Charleson is a given name and a surname. Notable people with the name include:

== Surname ==
- Bill Charleson (1929–1983), Australian rules footballer
- Ian Charleson (1949–1990), Scottish actor
- Leslie Charleson (1945–2025), American actress
- Mary Charleson (1890–1961), Irish silent film actress

== Middle name ==
- Ian Charleson Hedge (1928–2022), Scottish botanist

== See also ==
- Carleson (disambiguation)
- Charleston (name)
- Charleton (name)
