= Kurt Johansson (mathematician) =

Swedish mathematician

Kurt Johansson (born 1960) is a Swedish mathematician, specializing in probability theory.

Johansson received his PhD in 1988 from Uppsala University under the supervision of Lennart Carleson and is a professor in mathematics at KTH Royal Institute of Technology.

In 2000 Johansson was awarded the Rollo Davidson Prize in Probability theory. In 2002 he was an invited speaker of the International Congress of Mathematicians in Beijing and was awarded the Göran Gustafsson Prize. In 2006 he was elected a member of the Royal Swedish Academy of Sciences. In 2012 he was elected a fellow of the American Mathematical Society.

== Selected publications ==
- Johansson, Kurt (1997). "On Random Matrices from the Compact Classical Groups". The Annals of Mathematics. 145 (3): 519–545. doi:10.2307/2951843. JSTOR 2951843.
- Johansson, Kurt (1998). "On fluctuations of eigenvalues of random Hermitian matrices". Duke Mathematical Journal. 91 (1): 151–204. doi:10.1215/S0012-7094-98-09108-6. ISSN 0012-7094.
- Baik, Jinho; Deift, Percy; Johansson, Kurt (1999). "On the distribution of the length of the longest increasing subsequence of random permutations". Journal of the American Mathematical Society. 12 (4): 1119–1179. arXiv:math/9810105. doi:10.1090/S0894-0347-99-00307-0.
- Johansson, Kurt (2000). "Transversal fluctuations for increasing subsequences on the plane". Probability Theory and Related Fields. 116 (4): 445–456. arXiv:math/9910146. doi:10.1007/s004400050258. hdl:2027.42/142448. S2CID 16313314.
- Johansson, Kurt (2000). "Shape Fluctuations and Random Matrices". Communications in Mathematical Physics. 209 (2): 437–476. arXiv:math/9903134. Bibcode:2000CMaPh.209..437J. doi:10.1007/s002200050027. ISSN 0010-3616. S2CID 16291076.
- Johansson, Kurt (2001). "Random Growth and Random Matrices". European Congress of Mathematics. Progress in Mathematics, vol. 201. pp. 445–456. doi:10.1007/978-3-0348-8268-2_25. ISBN 978-3-0348-9497-5.
- Johansson, Kurt (2001). "Discrete orthogonal polynomial ensembles and the Plancherel measure" (PDF). Annals of Mathematics. 153 (1): 259–296. arXiv:math/9906120. doi:10.2307/2661375. JSTOR 2661375. S2CID 14120881.
- Johansson, Kurt (2002). "Non-intersecting paths, random tilings and random matrices". Probability Theory and Related Fields. 123 (2): 225–280. arXiv:math/0011250. doi:10.1007/s004400100187. S2CID 17994807.
- Johansson, Kurt (2005). "Non-intersecting, simple, symmetric \- random walks and the extended Hahn kernel". Annales de l'Institut Fourier. 55 (6): 2129–2145. arXiv:math/0409013. doi:10.5802/aif.2155. ISSN 0373-0956. S2CID 8434266.
- Johansson, K. (2007). "From Gumbel to Tracy-Widom". Probability Theory and Related Fields. 138 (1–2): 75–112. doi:10.1007/s00440-006-0012-7. S2CID 15410267.
- Adler, Mark; Johansson, Kurt; Van Moerbeke, Pierre (2014). "Double Aztec diamonds and the tacnode process". Advances in Mathematics. 252: 518–571. arXiv:1112.5532. doi:10.1016/j.aim.2013.10.012.
- Adler, Mark; Chhita, Sunil; Johansson, Kurt; Van Moerbeke, Pierre (2015). "Tacnode GUE-minor processes and double Aztec diamonds" (PDF). Probability Theory and Related Fields. 162 (1–2): 275–325. doi:10.1007/s00440-014-0573-9. S2CID 119126886.
- Johansson, Kurt (2019). "The two-time distribution in geometric last-passage percolation". Probability Theory and Related Fields. 175 (3–4): 849–895. arXiv:1802.00729. doi:10.1007/s00440-019-00901-9.
