= Bernard Grofman =

American political scientist (born 1944)

Personal details
- Born: Bernard Norman Grofman; December 2, 1944 (age 81) Houston, Texas, U.S.
- Party: Democratic
- Education: University of Chicago (BS, MA, PhD)

Bernard Norman Grofman (born December 2, 1944) is a political scientist at the University of California, Irvine. He is an expert on redistricting and has been a special master on several district map redrawings.

From the University of Chicago he received a B.S. (1966) in mathematics and an M.A. (1968) and Ph.D. (1972) in political science. He began teaching at the University of California, Irvine, in 1976, becoming a full professor in 1980.

His works include Quiet Revolution in the South: The Impact of the Voting Rights Act, 1965-1990 (with Chandler Davidson, eds., 1994), Legacies of the 1964 Civil Rights Act (ed., 2000), Political Science as Puzzle Solving (ed., 2001), A Unified Theory of Voting (with Samuel Merrill III, 1999), and A Unified Theory of Party Competition (with James Adams and Samuel Merrill III, 2005), among many others. He also published over 200 articles in periodicals.

He has published several articles under the pseudonym "A. Wuffle" or "Uncle Wuffle", with the conceit that Wuffle was Grofman's associate or assistant, including "The pure theory of elevators" (Mathematics Magazine, 1982), "Should you brush your teeth on November 6, 1984?: A rational choice perspective" (PS, 1984), "A corollary to the third axiom of general semantics" (Journal of Theoretical Politics, 1992), or "Death where is thy sting? The Senate as a Ponce (de Leon) scheme" (PS, 1997).

In 2015, Grofman was appointed as a special master to redraw Virginia's congressional districts after US federal judges ruled that the previous districts were unconstitutionally gerrymandered to pack one district with African-Americans and dilute their influence through the rest of the state. The US Supreme Court declined to intervene, allowing Grofman's maps to be used.

In 2018, Grofman was again appointed as a special master to redraw the districts for Virginia's House of Delegates.
