= Chater's Annual =

Book by John W. Chater

Chater's Annual for (followed by the actual year)
- Author: John W. Chater
- Language: English, many in (Geordie dialect)
- Genre: annual – book
- Publisher: John W. Chater
- Publication date: between (at least) 1861 and 1882
- Publication place: United Kingdom
- Media type: Print
- Pages: varies but generally over 50 pages

Chater's Annual was a book, published annually, between (at least) 1861 and 1882 by John W. Chater. It contained a mixture of songs, poems, humorous tales, jokes, conundrums, tongue twisters and other items of frivolity.

The full title of the book was "Chater's Annual for (here was the year e.g. 1878) containing – Mirth for Midsummer, Merriment for Michaelmas, Cheerfulness for Christmas, and Laughter for Lady-Day, forming a collection of Parlour Poetry and Drawing Room Drollery, suitable for all seasons; And supplying Smiles for Summer, Amusement for Autumn, Wit for Winter, and Sprightliness for Spring. Illustrated by J. L. Marcke, Newcastle-upon-Tyne J. W. Chater, stationers, 89 Clayton Street, Newcastle-upon-Tyne. Entered at Stationers Hall"

A copy of most years books are now held at Beamish Museum

== The publication ==
The front cover of the issue for 1878 (most others were virtually identical) was as thus :-

CHATER'S ANNUAL
FOR 1878
CONTAINING --
Mirth for Midsummer, Merriment for Michaelmass, Cheerfulness for Christmas,
and Laughter for Lady-Day,
FORMING A COLLECTION OF
Parlour Poetry and Drawing Room Drollery,
SUITABL;E FOR ALL SEASONS;
And supplying Smiles for Summer, Amusement for Autumn, Wit for Winter,
and Sprightliness for Spring.
ILLUSTRATED BY J. L. MARCKE
Newcastle-upon-Tyne
J. W. CHATER, STATIONERS, 89 CLAYTON STREET.
ENTERED AT STATIONERS HALL
– – – – – – – -
THE SEVENTEENTH YEAR OF PUBLICATION

The cost of the publication was sixpence

== Contents ==
The contents cover many topics, mainly written in the Geordie dialect.

Below is a small sample of the type of items these annuals contained :-

=== Songs ===
- Bit o' rettify, to the tune of Nae gud luck (1877 annual)
- Blyth and Tyne – (Th'), to the tune of Aw'll meet ye i' th' l'yen (1879 annual)
- Brig that leads te Bensham, to the tune of X. Y. Z. (1878 annual)
- Cheer up Sall, to the tune of Cheer up Sam (1877 annual)
- D. T., to the tune of Nelly Gray (1877 annual)
- Droppers in, to the tune of Jeanette and Jeano (1877 annual)
- Fishwife's dilemma. As sung by Rowley Harrison at the New Tyne Concert, in the pantomime of 'Cyprus' to the tune of The Sunny side of life – author Joseph McGill (1879 annual)
- Five shillings and costs, to the tune of (1882 annual)
- Geordy's pay, to the tune of Bawbary Bell (1879 annual) see notes A-D1 & Tune-A (tune should be spelt as Barbara Bell)
- Greetest want iv aal – (The), to the tune of (1882 annual)
- Happy Land O' Lazy – (The), to the tune of Land of Erin (1878 annual)
- Hidden whisky – author Marshall Cresswell (1882 annual)
- Him an' Me (1879 annual)
- Jimmy Diddler (1879 annual)
- Kitty's a kittlor, to the tune of Lass dissent care tuppence for ye (1878 annual)
- Lass of Annitsford – (The) (1877 annual) see note MC-C1
- Lotree – (Th') or Upside Doon (1879 annual)
- Mary Jane o' Stella, to the tune of Lass o' Gowrie (1877 annual)
- Mother's lektor or B canny wi' the shuggar – author Alexander Hay (1882 annual)
- Odd man oot an' raffil, to the tune of Newcassel races (1878 annual)
- Peedees of awd, to the tune of Bonnie Dundee (1878 annual)
- Poor Uncle John (1878 annual)
- Ride on the Swing Bridge – (A), to the tune of (1882 annual)
- Sall's Dilemmor, to the tune of Why don't the men propose (1877 annual)
- Slaley traykil bubble, to the tune of Happy land o' Canaan (1877 annual)
- What mun he be, to the tune of Villikins (1877 annual)
- What will poor fokes de?, to the tune of The Wahin' Day (1879 annual)
- When t'yuth's wark's bad, to the tune of Plaidee awa (1877 annual)
- Wor canny toon (1879 annual)
- Wor koit club, to the tune of ? (1878 annual)
- Wor river, to the tune of (1882 annual)

=== Poems ===
- Bella Walker's Advice tiv hor dowter, a poem (1877 annual) see note MC-C1
- Blaydon Burn, a poem (1882 annual)
- Dogs Not Admitted, a poem (1882 annual)
- Getting' used te Nursin', a poem (1877 annual)
- Sheeps Heed Broth, a poem (1879 annual)

=== Tales ===
- Jacky's Raffil, a story (1878 annual)
- On the Quayside (a conversation about the New Fish Market), a story (1882 annual)
- Two Measures (The), a story (1878 annual)

=== Example of a limerick ===
- Thor was an awd cobbler at Walker,
- Had for wife a greet shrew an' high tawker,
- An' he did a gud job,
- when he stich'd up the gob,
- O' this randy awd hussey at Walker (1877 annual)

=== Example of a tongue twister ===
- Round the rocks the ragged rascal roams his rugged road (1882 annual)

== Notes ==
A-D1 – according to Thomas Allan's Tyneside Songs and Readings of 1891, the writer is George Cameron
MC-C1 – according to Cresswell's Local and other Songs and Recitations 1883, the writer is Marshall Cresswell
Tune-A -The tune is not given in the book – but it has been added as attributed in Thomas Allan's Illustrated Edition of Tyneside Songs and Readings

== See also ==
Geordie dialect words
John W. Chater
Chater's Canny Newcassel Diary and Remembrancer 1872
Chater's Keelmin's Comic Annewal – a yearbook published between 1869 and 1883
