= Chater's Canny Newcassel Diary and Remembrancer 1872 =

Book by John W. Chater

- Author: John W. Chater
- Language: English, many in (Geordie dialect)
- Genre: book, almanac
- Publisher: John W. Chater
- Publication date: 1872
- Publication place: United Kingdom
- Media type: Print
- Pages: over 130 pages

Chater's Canny Newcassel Diary and Remembrancer was a book, published in 1872 by John W. Chater. It contained a mixture of "songs, poems, humorous tales, jokes, conundrums, tongue twisters and other items of frivolity".

The full title of the book was “Chater's 'Canny Newcassel' Diary and Local Remembrancer, For Bissextile or Leap-Year, 1872. Compiled expressly for this district. J. W. Chater, 89, Clayton Street, Newcastle upon Tyne - 1872".

A copy of an original books is now held at Beamish Museum/

== The publication ==
The front cover is as thus:

CHATER'S
"CANNY NEWCASSL"
DIARY
AND
Local Remembrancer,
FOR BISSEXTILE OR LEAP-YEAR,
1872
COMPILED EXPRESSLY FOR THIS DISTRICT
- - - - - - -
NEWCASTLE-UPON-TYNE
J. W. CHATER, 89, CLAYTON STREET
1872

== Contents ==
The contents cover many topics, mainly written in the Geordie dialect, often very broad.

Below is a small sample of the songs (and poetry) which this book contained:

- "The black leggin'-pollis", author John C. Clemintson of Jarror - a third prize winner
- "Coaly Tyne" see notes M-G2 & Tune-A
- "Fun(d) Risin'", a short recitation
- "Krissimiss box (Foondid on fact)", author possibly James Anderson
- "Me fethur's drunk ag'yen", to the tune of "Cassels i' the air", author James Anderson
- "Nine oors a day or Common Measures", to the tune of "We have ne work te de doo-hoo-hoo", author possibly James Anderson
- "A Pitman's Trubles", author Robert Elliott Jnr. of Choppington - a silver medal winner
- "Tyekin' o' the sensis", to the tune of "Airly in the mornin'", author possibly James Anderson
- "A warm fireside", to the tune of "Lass o' Glenshee", author James Anderson - a silver medal winner
- "We're seldom what we shud be", to the tune of "Country cousin", author possibly James Anderson see note D-D1

== Notes ==
D-D1 - according to Dunbar's local songs and recitations 1874, the writer is William Dunbar
M-G2 - according to Marshall's Collection of Songs, Comic, Satirical 1827, the writer is Robert Gilchrist
Tune-A -The tune is not given in the book - but it has been added as attributed in Thomas Allan's Illustrated Edition of Tyneside Songs and Readings of 1891

== See also ==
- Geordie dialect words
- John W. Chater
- Chater’s Annual – a yearbook published between 1861-1882
- Chater’s Keelmin's Comic Annewal – a yearbook published between 1869 and 1883
