= Chandler Davidson =

American civil rights activist (1936–2021)

- Occupation: Professor

Franklin Chandler Davidson (May 13, 1936 – April 10, 2021) was a professor of public policy at Rice University and a scholar who studied voting rights.

== Education ==
Chandler served in the U.S. Navy from 1959-1961, received a degree in philosophy (1961) from the University of Texas, and went on to receive a M.A. and Ph.D. in sociology from Princeton University. He later co-founded the sociology department at Rice University.

== Career ==
For his research, he conducted numerous recorded interviews of Texas politicians, and was asked to testify as an expert before the U.S. Congress on voting issues. His work with political scientist Bernard Grofman and 30 other researchers studied the impact of the Voting Rights Act of 1965 in the Southern United States, and led to the publication of the book, Quiet Revolution in the South, (1994).

Rice holds his collection of papers and research materials.

== Work ==
- Biracial Politics : Conflict and Coalition in the Metropolitan South (1972)
- Minority Vote Dilution (1984), editor
- Quiet Revolution in the South co-written with Bernard Grofman
- Controversies in Minority Voting: The Voting Rights Act in Perspective with Bernard Grofman
- Race and Class in Texas Politics
