= Blyth and Tyneside Poems & Songs =

Book by James Anderson

- Author: James Anderson
- Language: English, many in (Geordie dialect)
- Genre: book
- Publisher: John 'Scribe' Fraser
- Publication date: 1898
- Publication place: United Kingdom
- Media type: Print
- Pages: 126 pages

== Details ==
Blyth and Tyneside Poems & Songs was a book, published in 1898. It contained well over 50 songs in its 126 pages.

The full title of the book was "Blyth and Tyneside Poems & Songs by James Anderson, (Pay Friday,) Blyth; J. Fraser, Scribe Office, Blyth Price One Shilling" and was a collection of poems written by James Anderson and printed by J. Fraser, Scribe Office, Blyth

A copy of the book is now held at the Border History Museum in Hexham, Northumberland, England.

== The publication ==
The front cover of the book is as thus :-

BLYTH AND TYNESIDE
POEMS & SONGS
BY
– - – - – -
JAMES ANDERSON,
(PAY FRIDAY,)
BLYTH
J. Fraser, Scribe Office, Blyth

The cost of the publication was One Shilling

== Contents ==
The contents included the following songs, mainly written in the Geordie dialect, often very broad, all written by James Anderson, and listed here in alphabetical order-

- Aa wunder what canny aad Blyth 'll say noo
- Another Song in answer to James Armstrong
- At Heddon-on-the-Wall
- Aud Billy Henderson's wonderful coat, to the tune of Cappy's, the Dog
- Aw wish pay Friday wad cum, to the tune of Aw wish yor muther wud cum (This song was awarded first prize in the Newcastle Weekly Chronicle song competition of 1870)
- Aw wish that time wad cum, to the tune of John Anderson, my Joe
- Aw'll buy ne mair butter o' Paddison's wife, to the tune of Laird o' Cockpen
- Aw'll nivor gan drinkin' i' Blyth onny mair, to the tune of Laird o' Cockpen
- Be kind te yer wife
- Blyth sailor's farewell, to the tune of Laird o' Cockpen
- Bonny banks of o' Tyne
- Bonny bright eyed Mary
- Bonny Throckley Fell
- brightest gem on earth – (The)
- Clocks at the Central Station – (The)
- Four Seasons – (The)
- Friendship's Smile
- Half the lees they tell isn't true
- High price o' coals; or, Peggy's lament
- Honest workin' man
- Jack an' Nan
- Jennie and Jemmie, a parody on the song 'When ye gang awa, Jemmie'
- John Bryson, the Miners' Best Friend
- Last line – an' spent a jolly neet man
- Late Mr James Bonner – (The)
- Little favourite Pink Flower – (My)
- Local Poet's Lament for Jos Chater – (The)
- Man, know Thyself
- Mary on the Banks of Tyne
- Miseries of man
- Music
- Northumberland miners' strike, 1876
- Residence in Blyth – (My)
- Rural Retreat – (A)
- Sally and Bobby, to the tune of Cappy's, the Dog
- Sally and Sam
- Smiling Face – (A)
- Sweet Little Home by the Sea – (My)
- Thor's queer folks noo o' days
- Toast – (A), On taking a friendly Glass of Beer (awarded first prize in a competition)
- Tortoise-shell tom cat
- Town of Old Hexham – (The)
- True Manhood
- Walbottle Dene, to the tune of John Anderson, my Joe
- What did aw get married for?, to the tune of Green grows the rashes o
- What is Love
- Wor Bonny Pit Lad

== See also ==
- Geordie dialect words
