= Marshall Cresswell =

Marshall Cresswell (1833-1889) was a Northumberland born miner, poet and songwriter. His experiences to and from his job in Borneo were serialised later in the local newspaper.

== Early life ==
Marshall Cresswell was born on 18 January 1833 in the colliery village of Fawdon Square (now combined with other villages and suburbs to form Fawdon), the son of Thomas Cresswell and his wife Jane.

After a short time at school, he left at the age of 9 and went "down the pit" like a great many at this age. After serving his apprenticeship, he became a sinker. He was working on the sinking of a new shaft for a colliery near Sherburn Station in December 1856 when he was informed that the eminent local engineer William Coulson was seeking three experienced men to go out to Borneo as "sinkers".

Marshall Cresswell applied and was awarded one of the positions, all of which led to a period of what could be called "Adventure and excitement". He set sail bound for Sarawak on the island of Borneo from Gravesend via Rio de Janeiro and Singapore in February 1857 on the Gwalior and immediately became involved in long sea journeys, shipwrecks, storms, hostile natives, excessive heat, and all that goes with these. It would be 20 September 1859 when he arrived back on the Tyne

The story of his adventure, "From Dudley Colliery to Borneo - by Marshall Creswell", was later serialised in the Newcastle Courant, running from 18 January to 12 April 1878 – Annotated versions: or

== Later life ==
On his return to Newcastle, Marshall Cresswell commenced work again in the Tyneside pit at Dudley. He married Esther Brown in 1860, and they had six sons and a daughter.

He wrote numerous songs and recitation, many published by John W Chater, winning a gold medal with "Morpeth Lodgings" in one competition. In 1876, Chater published a 36-page book entitled Local and other Songs and Recitations, which was a collection of Marshall Cresswell's songs with a short autobiographical preface. A second edition of 143 pages was published in 1883, 38 of which were Dudley Colliery to Borneo.

He died on 31 July 1889, and was buried at Cramlington. Obituaries appeared in the Newcastle Daily Journal of 2 August and the Newcastle Weekly Chronicle of 3 August.

== Notes ==
The above details are from his own autobiography, newspaper cuttings, and details found in Thomas Allan’s Illustrated Edition of Tyneside Songs and Readings and Farne archives, all of which appear to be the main source of information.

== Works ==
These include (in alphabetical order) the following list (which also includes a very brief resumé of each):

- Annitsford bogle - (The) - a fact – A pitman's encounter with a ghost (who turns out to be a drunken woman
- Awd man's petition fra the workhoose te Tommy Burt – A man's appeal to his M.P. after being separated from his wife and placed in a workhouse
- Banks of the Wear - (The) – Song extolling the River Wear
- Bashful sweet heart - (The) – Song about courtship
- Bella Walker's advice tiv hor dowtor – Mother advises unmarried daughter on the choice of a husband
- Collier's doom - (The) – Song relating an accident at Dudley Colliery on 31 December 1879
- "Creemayshon" – Protest song about the increasing use of cremation
- Dudley pet - (The), sung to the tune of "X. Y. Z. or The Pawnshop Bleezin'" - A story of a mis-placed bet
- "Dudley Station" – Comic song about Dudley Station being called "Annitsford" by railway when Annitsford considered an inferior place at the time
- Fall at Dudley - (The) - song written 21 March 1877 about the re-organisation of Dudley Colliery
- For Ever at Rest, sung to the tune of "The Cliffs of Old Tynemouth" - Song of the loss of a mother
- Frustrated feast - (The) - Song telling how a robbery ruined a feast prepared for a 50th birthday
- Good Templar's happy home - (The) - A temperance song
- Grainger Monnymint - (The), sung to the tune of "Wundorful Tallygrip"
- Happy Pair O' Blyth - (The) - Song in which a husband, unable to settle the bairn, must go to the religious meeting, which his wife is attending
- Hidden whisky bottle - (The) - Husband cures his wife's secret drinking by replacing the whisky in the bottle
- Invisible ghost - (The) - A pitman working a seam, meets a ghost (it appears that naked lights were still in use c1883)
- Joe's last voyage to sea - A sailor and his friend, return, drunk, to the ship to sleep it off and awake to find they are at sea
- Lad that wants a Wife - (The) - a checklist of desired characteristics for his future wife.
- Lass of Annitsford - (The) - A love song
- Laws, Gledson, an' Mycroft, sung to the tune of "The Wonderful Talleygraf" - Song about a bowls match on Newcastle Town Moor
- Midneet adventor - (A) - Three men attempt to steal potatoes but the plan misfires
- Modest appeal - (A) - finding a suitable partner
- Morpeth Bankwet - (The), sung to the tune of "The wonderful Telegraph"
- Morpeth Lodgings, sung to the tune of "Wait for the waggon" – Miner from Dudley gets drunk in Seaton Burn and jailed at Morpeth losing two weeks' wages
- Mother winnet cum h'yem, sung to the tune of "Kathleen Mavourneen" – Song about a reformed wife
- Nanny Moore; a parody – Song about a drunken woman wheeled home in a barrow and pleased 'Aw've oney spent a croon'
- Naughty workhouse lad - (The) - Song about a boy who plays a trick on his teacher by hiding in a coffin
- Neet sk'yul - (The), sung to the tune of "X. Y. Z. or The Pawnshop Bleezin'" – Two drunken pitmen caught playing pitch and toss in the dark, are sent to Morpeth Gaol
- New tramway car - (The) - a tale of a trip to Newcastle to see the new horse-drawn trams
- North Durham election - (The) - Poem in support of a local M.P. Sir George Elliot
- Pea-puddin' hot, sung to the tune of "Jennywine Yest" - Comic song about two drunken local lads eating peas pudding while sitting at the roadside
- Peter's pay, or the benefit of a bargain - A pitman gives his wife "dud" coins in his wages as a joke
- Pitman meedyum - (The), sung to the tune of "Tramp, Tramp" - Song about a medium who can contact people from the past
- Pitman's advice tiv his son - (A) - A collection of suggestions and warnings about life and marriage
- Pitman's visit te Rio de Janeiro - (A) - Part of his journey to Borneo
- Poor convict lad - (The) - song about the repercussions of a convict's crimes on his family
- Resurrection men - (The) - A fact - Two pitmen dig up the carcass of a cow to sell to a rag and bone man
- Robert Gledson's pedigree - Song about a successful athlete
- Strange bed - (A) - A drunken man sleep's an uncomfortable night in the gutter
- Summer's cleanin' - (The) - The disruption caused by spring cleaning
- Telegraphic news - Song about a gardener who set a trap for thieves and only catches cats at play
- That day hes noo g'yen by, sung to the tune of "The Miller O' the Dee" - Song about the changes in the mining industry
- Time muthor lay bad i' bed - (The) - We find out the value of the house wife after she has been taken ill
- Tom Linkin's box, sung to the tune of "Tinkers wedding" - Song about a driller at Dudley Colliery, and his equipment
- Unk'yuked Tripe - (The) - A husband return home drunk and tries to eat a sock which has fallen on the food
- Whisky het - Two men, both drunk and staying over at a friend's house, mistake a bottle of washing water for whisky
- Willow Tree - (The) – Song on a famous Dudley tree
- Wonderful change at Dudley - (The) – A song detailing changes in the mining industry to a fairer system known as 'Billy Fairplay'

== See also ==
Geordie dialect words
Cresswell's Local and other Songs and Recitations 1883
John W Chater
