= Thomas Wolff =

American mathematician

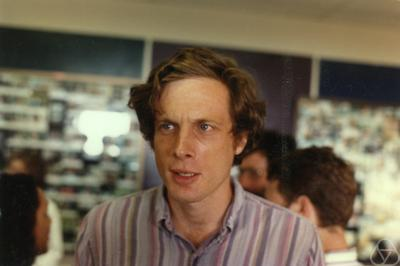
Wolff in 1992

Thomas Hartwig Wolff (July 14, 1954, New York City – July 31, 2000, Kern County) was an American mathematician, working primarily in the fields of harmonic analysis, complex analysis, and partial differential equations. As an undergraduate at Harvard University, he regularly played poker with his classmate Bill Gates. While a graduate student at the University of California, Berkeley from 1976 to 1979, under the direction of Donald Sarason, he obtained a new proof of the corona theorem, a famously difficult theorem in complex analysis. He was made Professor of Mathematics at Caltech in 1986, and was there from 1988–1992 and from 1995 to his death in a car accident in 2000. He also held positions at the University of Washington, University of Chicago, New York University, and University of California, Berkeley.

He received the Salem Prize in 1985 and the Bôcher Memorial Prize in 1999, for his contributions to analysis and particularly to the Kakeya conjecture. He was an Invited Speaker at the International Congress of Mathematicians in 1986 in Berkeley and in 1998 in Berlin.
