= Robert H. Knight =

American activist (born 1951)

Robert H. Knight (born April 23, 1951) is an American conservative writer and activist. He was a draftsman of the federal Defense of Marriage Act, which barred federal recognition of same-sex marriage. DOMA was invalidated by the Supreme Court in United States v. Windsor (2013). He is senior fellow of the American Civil Rights Union and a regular columnist for The Washington Times. He was senior writer for Coral Ridge Ministries (now D. James Kennedy Ministries) and director of the Culture and Media Institute, a project founded in 2006 by the Media Research Center in Alexandria, Virginia. Knight has also served as director of the Culture & Family Institute, an affiliate of Concerned Women for America.

== Career ==
Knight worked as an editor and writer for the Los Angeles Times and was a 1989–1990 media fellow at the Hoover Institution at Stanford University. He was a senior fellow for cultural policy studies at The Heritage Foundation before becoming director of cultural studies at the Family Research Council.

=== Views ===
Knight is a social conservative. He is an outspoken opponent on same-sex marriage and civil unions and has written prolifically on that topic. He believes that recognizing same-sex couples "will destroy marriage" and "would threaten families, children, and ultimately civilization." In 1995, Knight accused the Log Cabin Republicans, a group of gay Republicans, of being a "small group trying to harness government power to force affirmation of unhealthy, immoral and destructive behavior." Knight has stated: "The end goal of gay activism is the criminalization of Christianity" and has accused gays of advocating pedophilia and attempting to recruit youth. He has referred to abortion, pornography, and gay rights as part of an "iron triangle." In the aftermath of the 1998 torture and murder of Matthew Shepard, a gay student, Knight denounced the murder but opposed proposals to extend hate crime laws, believing them to be "the precursor toward thought crimes."

In a 1995 interview, Knight asserted that, "Lesbianism is the animating principle of feminism. Because feminism, at the core, is at war with motherhood, femininity, family, and God. And lesbians are at war with all these things."

Knight is on the advisory board of the Abstinence Clearinghouse, which promotes abstinence-only sex education.

His 2018 manifesto, A Nation Worth Fighting For: 10 Steps to Restore Freedom, calls upon Evangelical Christians to "go on offense against the darkness, not cower in our church buildings, hoping it will go away."

== Personal life ==
He has a B.S. in 1973 and M.S. in 1975 in political science from American University in Washington, D.C. In 1981, he married his wife Barbara, with whom he now lives in the Washington, D.C. area.
