= Stone–Čech remainder =

Topology in mathematics

In mathematics, the Stone–Čech remainder of a topological space X, also called the corona or corona set, is the complement βX \ X of the space in its Stone–Čech compactification βX.

A topological space is said to be σ-compact if it is the union of countably many compact subspaces, and locally compact if every point has a neighbourhood with compact closure. The Stone–Čech remainder of a σ-compact and locally compact Hausdorff space is a sub-Stonean space, i.e., any two open σ-compact disjoint subsets have disjoint compact closures.

== See also ==
- Corona theorem
- Corona algebra, a non-commutative analogue of the corona set.
