= Sub-Stonean space =

In topology, a sub-Stonean space is a locally compact Hausdorff space such that any two open σ-compact disjoint subsets have disjoint compact closures. Related, an F-space, introduced by Gillman & Henriksen (1956), is a completely regular Hausdorff space for which every finitely generated ideal of the ring of real-valued continuous functions is principal, or equivalently every real-valued continuous function $f$ can be written as $f=g|f|$ for some real-valued continuous function $g$. When dealing with compact spaces, the two concepts are the same, but in general, the concepts are different. The relationship between the sub-Stonean spaces and F-spaces is studied in Henriksen and Woods, 1989.

== Examples ==
Rickart spaces and the corona sets of locally compact σ-compact Hausdorff spaces are sub-Stonean spaces.

== See also ==
- Extremally disconnected space
- F-space
