= Michael Benedicks =

Swedish mathematician (born 1949)

Michael Benedicks, born 1949, is a Professor of Mathematics at the Royal Institute of Technology (KTH) in Stockholm, Sweden.

He received his Ph.D. from the Royal Institute of Technology in 1980. His doctoral advisor was Professor Harold S. Shapiro. He was a visiting scholar at the Institute for Advanced Study in the summer of 1989. He became a Professor of Mathematics at the Royal Institute of Technology in 1991.

His research interests include dynamic systems. For example, he has studied Hénon maps together with Professor Lennart Carleson.

He became a member of the Royal Swedish Academy of Sciences in 2007.
