= Warwick Tucker =

Australian mathematician

Warwick Tucker is an Australian mathematician at Monash University (previously deputy Chair and Chair at the Department of Mathematics at Uppsala University 2009–2020) who works on dynamical systems, chaos theory and computational mathematics. He is a recipient of the 2002 R. E. Moore Prize, and the 2004 EMS Prize.

Tucker obtained his Ph.D. in 1998 at Uppsala University (thesis: The Lorenz attractor exists) with Lennart Carleson as advisor.

In 2002, Tucker succeeded in solving an important open problem that had been posed by Stephen Smale (the fourteenth problem on Smale's list of problems).

He was an invited speaker at the conference Dynamics, Equations and Applications in Kraków in 2019.
