= Charles Earl Rickart =

American mathematician

Charles Earl Rickart (1913 – 17 April 2002) was an American mathematician, known for Rickart spaces.

Rickart was born in Osage City, Kansas, and earned his B.A. and M.A. from the University of Kansas. In 1941, he received his PhD from the University of Michigan under Theophil Henry Hildebrandt with the thesis Integration in a Convex Linear Topological Space. Rickart was for two years the Benjamin Pierce Instructor at Harvard University. He joined the Yale mathematics faculty in 1943, served as chair of the department from 1959 to 1965, became the first Percey F. Smith Professor of Mathematics in 1963, and retired in 1983.

Rickart did research on Banach algebras and was the author of three books. In the late 1950s and early 1960s, he was one of the pioneers in introducing the "new math" into American schools. His doctoral students include Samuel Merrill III.

He died in North Branford, Connecticut where he lived, survived by his wife, Annabel Erickson Rickart, three sons, and four grandchildren.

== Works ==
- General Theory of Banach Algebras. Princeton, N. J.: Van Nostrand. 1960.; revised edn. R. E. Krieger. 1974.
- Natural Function Algebras. Springer. 1979.
- Structuralism and Structures, A Mathematical Perspective. Singapore: World Scientific Publishing. 1995.

== See also ==
- Baer ring
