= Samuel Merrill III =

American mathematician and social choice theorist

- Education: Tulane University; Yale University (PhD)

Samuel Merrill III (born 1939) is an American mathematician, social choice theorist, and political scientist best known for his work on alternative voting systems, voter behavior, party competition, and arbitration.

Merrill was raised in Bogalusa, Louisiana. He received his bachelor's degree from Tulane University and his Ph.D. in mathematics in 1965 from Yale University under C. E. Rickart with thesis Banach Spaces of Analytic Functions. Merrill was a professor of mathematics and statistics at Wilkes University until he retired in 2004.

Samuel Merrill is the author of three books on political science:

- Making Multicandidate Elections More Democratic (1988, Princeton University Press)
- A Unified Theory of Voting with Bernard Grofman (1999, Cambridge University Press)
- A Unified Theory of Party Competition with James Adams and Bernard Grofman (2005, Cambridge University Press)
