= Rickart space =

In mathematics, a Rickart space (after Charles Earl Rickart), also called a basically disconnected space, is a topological space in which open σ-compact subsets have compact open closures.

Grove & Pedersen (1984) named them after C. E. Rickart (1946), who showed that Rickart spaces are related to monotone σ-complete C*-algebras under Gelfand duality, in the same way that Stonean spaces are related to AW*-algebras.

Rickart spaces were also studied by Paul Halmos under the name Boolean σ-spaces, as they correspond to Boolean σ-algebras via Stone duality. The concept of Rickart spaces resurfaced in Jamneshan & Tao (2023) under the name Stone_{σ}-spaces.

Both algebraic descriptions (namely, the C*-algebraic and Boolean algebraic ones) are explicitly discussed in Fritz & Lorenzin (2025).

Rickart spaces are totally disconnected and sub-Stonean spaces.
