= Theophil Henry Hildebrandt =

American mathematician (1888–1980)

- Born: 24 July 1888; Dover, Ohio, US
- Died: 9 October 1980 (aged 92); Ann Arbor, Michigan, US
- Spouse: Dora E. Ware (married 1921)
- Children: 4
- Awards: Chauvenet Prize (1929)
- Scientific career
- Fields: mathematician
- Workplaces: University of Michigan
- Thesis: A Contribution to the Foundations of Fréchet's Calcul Fonctionnel (1910)
- Doctoral advisor: Eliakim Hastings Moore
- Doctoral students: Ralph Saul Phillips; Charles Earl Rickart; John V. Wehausen

Theophil Henry Hildebrandt (24 July 1888 – 9 October 1980) was an American mathematician who did research on functional analysis and integration theory.

Hildebrandt was born in Dover, Ohio, graduated from high school at age 14 and at age 17 in 1905 received his bachelor's degree from the University of Illinois. As a graduate student at the University of Chicago he earned his master's degree in 1906 and his PhD in 1910, with thesis A Contribution to the Foundations of Fréchet's Calcul Fonctionnel written under the direction of E. H. Moore. He became an instructor at the University of Michigan in 1909 and then a full professor in 1923, serving as chair of the mathematics department from 1934 until his retirement in 1957. His doctoral students include Ralph S. Phillips, Charles Earl Rickart, and John V. Wehausen.

In 1929 Hildebrandt received the Chauvenet Prize for his 1926 expository article The Borel theorem and its generalizations. He served two years, 1945 and 1946, as president of the American Mathematical Society. The U. of Michigan established in 1962 in his honor the T. H. Hildebrandt Research Instructorships, which were changed in 1974 to assistant professorships.

Hildebrandt, as an instructor at the U. of Michigan, enrolled in the School of Music and earned a degree in music with a major in organ. He played the organ in his local church. He married Dora E. Ware in 1921, and they had four children.

He died, aged 92, in Ann Arbor, Michigan.

== Selected publications ==
- T. H. Hildebrandt (1923). "On uniform limitedness of sets of functional operations". Bulletin of the American Mathematical Society. 29 (7): 309–315. doi:10.1090/s0002-9904-1923-03730-0. MR 1560736.
- T. H. Hildebrandt (1928). "Über vollstetige linear Transformationen". Acta Mathematica. 51 (1): 311–318. doi:10.1007/bf02545664. MR 1555265.
