= Dunbar's local songs and recitations 1874 =

Book by William Dunbar

Local Songs, Recitations & Conundrums by William Dunbar 1874
- Author: William Dunbar
- Language: English (Geordie dialect)
- Genre: chapbook
- Publisher: William Dunbar
- Publication date: 1874
- Publication place: United Kingdom
- Media type: Print
- Pages: over 40 pages

Dunbar's local songs and recitations 1874 (full title: “Dunbar's Local and other Songs, Recitations and Conundrums, A Local Tale, &c. Composed by the late William Dunbar, Wardley Colliery, who died February 23rd 1874, aged 21 years. Printed by Stevenson and Dryden, St Nicholas' Church Yard, Newcastle upon Tyne 1874”) is a chapbook of Geordie folk song consisting of over 40 pages, published in 1874, after the author's death.

== The publication ==
William Dunbar wrote all the songs and a set of the original documents are retained in the archives of Beamish Museum.

The front cover of the book was as thus :-

LOCAL AND OTHER

SONGS, RECITATIONS,
AND CONUNDRUMS,
A
Local Tale, &c
COMPOSED BY THE LATE
WILLIAM DUMBAR
WARDLEY COLLIERY

WHO DIED FEBRUARY 23RD 1874, AGED 21 YEARS

NEWCASTLE-UPON-TYNE
PRINTED BY STEVENSON AND DRYDEN, ST. NICHOLAS' CHURCH YARD

1874

== Contents ==
In alphabetical order are as below :-

	title	tune	brief description	ref
1	Best way to feel for a man	Wait for the turn of the tide		
2	Billy Baker	The Handsome Page		
3	Comic medley	Who's for the bus		
4	Deeth o' Jimmy Renforth	Castles in the air	famous local rower Jimmy Renforth	
5	Doing all things for the best	Take care of the peace		
6	Don't take offence	Act on the square		
7	Forester's song	Oxford Joe	Ancient Order of Foresters at Wrekenton in 1872	
8	Geordy's pay	Barbara Bell		
9	If ivvor aw cease te speak	If I ever cease to love		
10	Imitation	Just to show there's no ill feeling		
11	Joe the barber's boy	Imensicoff		
12	Joseph Arch	The Marble Arch	Joseph Arch was the president of the newly founded National Agricultural Labourers' Union	
13	Maw bonny Bess. (or A dog fancier's musings)			
14	My A B C (or items alphabetically arranged)	Bow, Wow, Wow		
15	North Durham election, 1874. A dialogue between Tommy Stobbs and Sally			
16	Nothing venture, nothing win	Par excellence		
17	Nowt se Queer as Foaks	Castles in the Air		
18	Playing the troon	A t'yel wiv a seekwil, an' monny an eekwil		
19	Pull that wins the day	Pull, pull together, boys		
20	Robin Ramsay; or, what aw'm puzzled wi'	The whole hog or none		
21	She greets me wiv a smile	I am so volatile		
22	Shiftin' – (The)			
23	Wardley Band – (The)	The pawnshop bleezin		
24	We hevvent lang te be sober noo	I wish I was a fish		
25	Wellesley lads – (The)	Imminsicoff	one of the first schools set up to train sailors	
26	We're seldom what we shud be	The country cousin	originally printed in Chater's Diary and Local Remembrancer	
27	Woman charmin' woman O	Try, try again	originally printed in Chater's Diary and Local Remembrancer	
28	Would you like to see	Down among the coals	originally printed in Chater's Diary and Local Remembrancer	

== See also ==
- Geordie dialect words
- William Dunbar
