= Carleson–Jacobs theorem =

In mathematics, the Carleson–Jacobs theorem, introduced by L. Carleson and S. Jacobs (1972), describes the best approximation to a continuous function on the unit circle by a function in a Hardy space.
