= Red Charleston =

American baseball player

- Catcher
- Batted: Right Threw: Right

Negro league baseball debut
- 1920, for the Birmingham Black Barons

Last appearance
- 1932, for the Nashville Elite Giants
- Stats at Baseball Reference

Teams
- Birmingham Black Barons (1920, 1923); Nashville Giants (1920); Montgomery Grey Sox (1921); Memphis Red Sox (1924); Nashville Elite Giants (1929–1932)

Red Charleston was an American professional baseball catcher in the Negro leagues. He played from 1920 to 1932 with several teams.
