= Peter Charleston =

Australian rules footballer

Personal information
- Full name: Peter Desmond Charleston
- Born: 28 August 1930
- Died: 8 August 2025 (aged 94)
- Original team: Prahran
- Height: 180 cm (5 ft 11 in)
- Weight: 81 kg (179 lb)

Playing career^{1}
| Years | Club | Games (Goals) |
| 1951, 1953 | Hawthorn | 6 (0) |
| 1954 | South Melbourne | 2 (0) |
| Total | | 8 (0) |
- ^{1} Playing statistics correct to the end of 1954.

Peter Desmond Charleston (28 August 1930 – 8 August 2025) was an Australian rules footballer who played with Hawthorn and South Melbourne in the Victorian Football League (VFL).
