= American Civil Rights Union =

American nonprofit legal organization

American Constitutional Rights Union
- Abbreviation: ACRU
- Formation: 1998
- Founder: Robert B. Carleson
- Type: 501(c)(3) charitable organization
- Tax ID no.: 52-2121856
- Headquarters: Naples, Florida
- Chairman and CEO: Lori Roman
- Website: www.theacru.org

The American Constitutional Rights Union (ACRU) is an American legal organization founded by former Reagan Administration official Robert B. Carleson in 1998 as a conservative counter to the American Civil Liberties Union.

== History ==
Due to a lack of resources, the ACRU originally restricted itself to amicus briefs, having filed briefs in 15 cases by 2008. It expanded into writing on legal issues and having its spokespeople appear on talk radio and TV.

When founder Carleson died in 2006, the Board of Directors elected to name his widow, Susan Carleson, a former Reagan administration official, Chairman and CEO.

The ACRU filed its first amicus brief in Boy Scouts of America v. Dale, a case in which the Supreme Court decided that the Boy Scouts could not be legally forced to retain openly gay adult Scout leaders. Other issues include Bush v. Palm Beach County Canvassing Board in December 2000, the Mount Soledad Cross controversy and other First Amendment cases, the District of Columbia v. Heller Second Amendment case and an Indiana voting-rights case regarding the use of photo ID. In 2010, the ACRU filed a brief arguing that the names of signers of a Washington state petition against gay marriage should not be published, likening gay rights activists to brownshirts.

== Leadership ==
The ACRU is chaired by Susan A. Carleson who took on the leadership of the organization following the passing of her husband Robert B. Carleson in 2006.. Kenneth A. Klukowski is the ACRU General Counsel and Robert H. Knight is a Senior Fellow.

The board of directors is chaired by Susan Carleson, it includes former Attorney General Ed Meese, and Morton Blackwell. The policy board initially included Robert Bork, William Bradford Reynolds, Curtin Winsor and James Q. Wilson. It was later joined by Walter E. Williams and Kenneth W. Starr.

== Court cases ==
The ACRU sued Starr county's elections office in 2016 for allegedly violating Section 8 of the National Voter Registration Act by not maintaining clean voter rolls. in September 2018, Starr County agreed to $55,000 in attorneys fees as part of the settlement agreement.

== Amicus briefs ==
- 9/11/2018 The ACRU Files an amicus brief in Timbs V. Indiana urging the Supreme Court to apply the right against excessive bail to the states through the Privileges or Immunities Clause of the Constitution.
- 7/25/2018 Michael C. Turzai, Speaker of the Pennsylvania House of Representatives, et al., Petitioners v. Gretchen Brandt, et al. Amicus filed defending Legislative Authority Over Redistricting.
- 4/10/2018 ACRU files an amicus brief in the U.S. Court of Appeals for the Eleventh Circuit in Greater Birmingham Ministries v. Merrill, arguing that the appeals court should hold that Alabama's voter-ID law is permitted by the federal Voting Rights Act (VRA).
- 3/9/2018 ACRU Files Supreme Court Brief in Support of President's Travel Restrictions arguing why Proclamation 9645 is fully consistent with the Constitution. Donald J. Trump, President of the United States, et al., Petitioners v. Hawaii, et al.
- 2/2/2018 ACRU files an amicus brief with the U.S. Supreme Court in North Carolina, et al., Applicants v. Sandra Little Covington, et al. arguing that (1) the district court used a novel theory of racial gerrymandering to review the legislature's map that removed all racial data (2) the district court imposed a de facto quota that the U.S. Supreme Court rejected last decade, and (3) the district court's decision erodes the federal judiciary's credibility, because the court so eagerly displaced the North Carolina General Assembly as the primary mapmaker
- 1/18/2018 ACRU submits amicus brief on Robert A. Rucho, et al., Applicants v. Common Cause, et al. arguing that the district court's demand for a redrawn legislative map was unreasonable, because it created a new set of incredibly complex tests and then gave the North Carolina legislature just 14 days to create a new map.

== See also ==
- Judicial Watch
- American Civil Liberties Union
- New York Civil Liberties Union
