= George Charleton Barron =

English poet

George Charleton Barron (c. 1846–1891) of Newcastle-upon-Tyne, England, was a Gateshead-born actor, mimic, elocutionist and general entertainer.

== Early life ==
George Charleton Barron was born in Gateshead about 1846. He started work as a clerk, working on the Quayside, Newcastle upon Tyne, and worked for a time with his relative Ralph Blackett, moving on to become a commercial traveller.

He was like so many, young and gifted, and yearning for a life on the stage, so he left the area. Unfortunately, the career as an actor was brief; he returned to Newcastle, where he played dramatic roles which, aided by his ability, made him a great favourite. He was much sought after by his wide circle of friends for social gatherings and could speak both Scottish and Tyneside dialects.

== Early death ==
In his prime he was struck down with an abscess on the head. Despite a seemingly successful operation, several days later he suffered a relapse and died shortly after. George Charleton Barron died 16 June 1891 at North Shields at the age of only 44 or 45. At the service, the Rev. H. Ian William, the Congregational minister, said: "His life was marked by many fine traits, but most noticeable was his bubbling cheerfulness — an animated sunbeam, which brightened everybody and every place".

== Works ==
He had endless stories, but most had been written by others. The only piece which he seems to have written himself was the Tale of "Bill Smith at the Battle of Waterloo" telling how Bill and a group of Geordies won the day. It is a typical story which illustrates the prejudices of human nature in general. The story was taken from an old American story.

== See also ==
Geordie dialect words
