= Bill Charleson =

Australian rules footballer

Personal information
- Full name: Bill Charleson
- Born: 5 July 1929
- Died: 17 September 1983 (aged 54)
- Original team: Campbell's Creek
- Height: 178 cm (5 ft 10 in)
- Weight: 77 kg (170 lb)

Playing career^{1}
Years	Club	Games (Goals)
1948	Fitzroy	4 (0)
- ^{1} Playing statistics correct to the end of 1948.

Bill Charleson (5 July 1929 – 17 September 1983) was a former Australian rules footballer who played with Fitzroy in the Victorian Football League (VFL).
