= Rice Charleton =

Rice Charleton (1710–1789) was an English physician, medical researcher, and Fellow of the Royal Society.

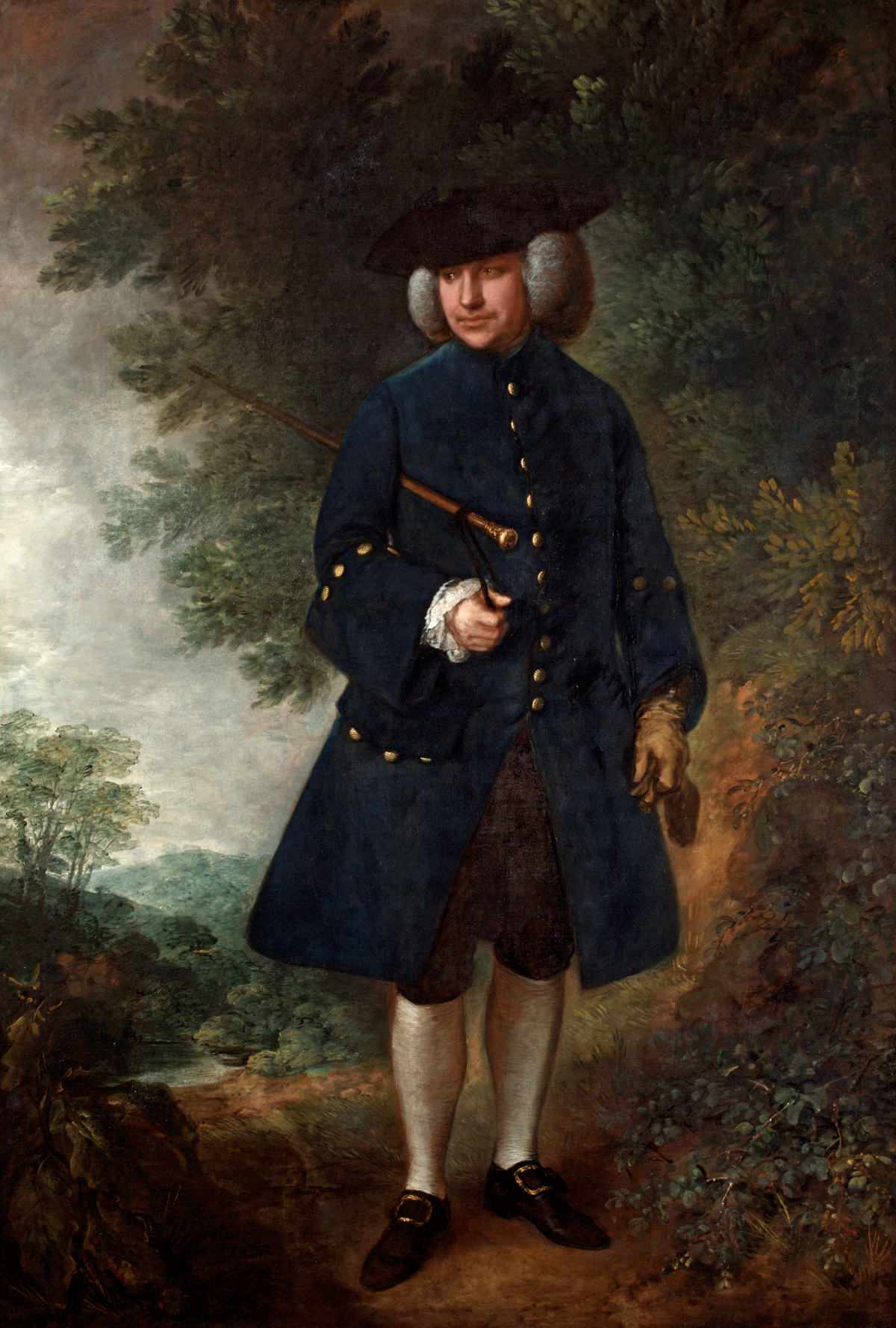
Rice Charleton, portrait by Thomas Gainsborough

== Life ==
Charleton was educated at the University of Oxford, where he took the degrees of M.A., M.B., and M.D. He settled in practice at Bath, Somerset, was elected physician to the Bath General Hospital 2 June 1757, and then lived in Alfred Street. He belonged to the Royal College of Physicians.

Charleton wrote on the chemistry of mineral waters, and was elected Fellow of the Royal Society on 3 November 1747. He then retired from the Society, in 1754. He resigned his post at the hospital 1 May 1781, and died in 1789.

== Works ==
In 1750 Charleton published A Chemical Analysis of Bath Waters. The book describes a series of experiments to determine the mineral constituents of the thermal springs at Bath. The chemical system of Hermann Boerhaave was followed. He published a second tract An Inquiry into the Efficacy of Bath Waters in Palsies, and reprinted it in 1774, with his first publication and Tract the Third, containing Cases of Patients admitted into the Hospital at Bath under the care of the late Mr. Oliver, with some additional Cases and Notes. The volume is dedicated to Thomas Osborne, 4th Duke of Leeds, who was one of Charleton's patients. It contains case histories, and argues that part of the reputation of the Bath waters as a cure for palsy was due to the large number of cases of paralysis from lead poisoning who arrived with useless limbs; and were cured by abstinence from cider having lead in solution, and by frequent bathing.

== Marriage ==
He married Mary Wright, the sister of Sir James Wright, 1st Baronet on 11 November 1759 at Walcot St. Swithin, Somerset, England. Her and Sir James's sister Jane Wright married John Moore, Archbishop of Canterbury.

== Notes ==
Attribution

This article incorporates text from a publication now in the public domain: Stephen, Leslie, ed. (1887). "Charleton, Rice". Dictionary of National Biography. Vol. 10. London: Smith, Elder & Co.
