= C. N. Carleson =

Swedish politician

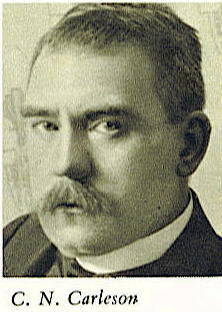
Carl Natanael Carleson

Carl Natanael Carleson (1865–1929), often referred to as C.N. Carleson, was a Swedish socialist politician and political writer.

As a student in Uppsala, Carleson became a radical participant of the working-class movement. From 1888 he wrote frequently in different socialist papers under the pseudonym Spartacus.

Carleson became a prominent leader in the Swedish Social Democratic Party and sided with the left-wing in the party split of 1917, and joined Zeth Höglund, Ture Nerman, Kata Dalström and Karl Kilbom as one of the leaders in what developed into the Communist Party of Sweden. However, he never fully agreed to the most radical communist policies and retired from politics in 1923 after internal disputes within the party.
