= Cresswell's Local and other Songs and Recitations 1883 =

Book by Marshall Cresswell

Cresswell's Local and other Songs, Recitations, Etc 1883
- Author: Marshall Cresswell
- Language: English (Geordie dialect)
- Genre: chapbook
- Publisher: Marshall Cresswell
- Publication date: 1883
- Publication place: United Kingdom
- Media type: Print
- Pages: 143 pages

Cresswell's Local and other Songs, Recitations, Etc. 1883 (or to give it is's full title – "Local and other Songs, Recitations, Etc Composed by Marshall Cresswell, Dudley, Northumberland. With Introductory Autobiography (second edition) Illustrated by J. W. Marcke. Newcastle-upon-Tyne. J. W. Chater 61 & 62 Grainger Street, West, 21, Collingwood Street, 89, Clayton Street, and "Cross House", Westgate Road and all Booksellers 1883" is a Chapbook of Geordie folk song consisting of over 100 pages, published in 1883.

== The publication ==
Marshall Cresswell wrote all the songs and a set of the original documents are retained in the archives of Border History Museum, Hexham.

The front cover of the book was as thus :-

LOCAL AND OTHER
SONGS, RECITATIONS,
ETC
COMPOSED BY
MARSHALL CRESSWELL
DUDLEY, NORTHUMBERLAND
WITH
INTRODUCTORY AUTOBIOGRAPHY
(SECOND EDITION)
ILLUSTRATED BY J. W. MARCKE

NEWCASTLE-UPON-TYNE
J. W. CHATER 61 & 62 GRAINGER STREET, WEST
21, COLLINGWOOD STREET
89, CLAYTON STREET, AND
"CROSS HOUSE", WESTGATE ROAD
AND ALL BOOKSELLERS

1883

== Contents ==
are as below :-

	title	songwriter	tune	brief description	ref
1	front cover				
3	Preface				
4	Preface to the First Edition			Brief autobiography, dated 9 March 1876	
7	Lad that wants a Wife – (The)	Marshall Cresswell			
9	Unk'yuked Tripe – (The)	Marshall Cresswell			
11	Bella Walker's advice tiv hor dowtor	Marshall Cresswell			
13	Awd man's petition fra the workhoose te Tommy Burt	Marshall Cresswell			
14	Pitman's advice tiv his son – (A)	Marshall Cresswell			
17	Joe's last voyage to sea	Marshall Cresswell			
20	Peter's pay, or the benefit of a bargain	Marshall Cresswell			
24	Time muthor lay bad i' bed – (The)	Marshall Cresswell			
25	Annitsford bogle – (The) – a fact	Marshall Cresswell			
27	Summer's cleanin' – (The)	Marshall Cresswell			
29	Invisible ghost – (The)	Marshall Cresswell			
31	Dudley pet – (The)	Marshall Cresswell	X. Y. Z. or The Pawnshop Bleezin'		
33	Morpeth Lodgings	Marshall Cresswell	Wait for the waggon	This song was awarded first prize in Chater's song competition.	
35	Lass of Annitsford – (The)	Marshall Cresswell			
36	Midneet adventor – (A)	Marshall Cresswell			
38	Hidden whisky bottle – (The)	Marshall Cresswell			
42	Bashful sweet heart – (The)	Marshall Cresswell			
44	Strange bed – (A)	Marshall Cresswell			
45	New tramway car – (The)	Marshall Cresswell			
47	Dudley Station	Marshall Cresswell			
49	Pitman's visit te Rio de Janeiro – (A)	Marshall Cresswell			
51	Whisky het	Marshall Cresswell			
54	Resurrection men – (The) – A fact	Marshall Cresswell			
56	Frustrated feast – (The)	Marshall Cresswell			
58	Creemayshon	Marshall Cresswell			
59	Neet sk'yul – (The)	Marshall Cresswell	X. Y. Z. or The Pawnshop Bleezin'		
61	Pitman meedyum – (The)	Marshall Cresswell	Tramp, Tramp		
62	Tom Linkin's box	Marshall Cresswell	Tinkers wedding		
63	Morpeth Bankwet – (The)	Marshall Cresswell	The wonderful Telegraph		
65	Telegraphic news	Marshall Cresswell			
67	For Ever at Rest	Marshall Cresswell	The Cliffs of Old Tynemouth		
68	Banks of the Wear – (The)	Marshall Cresswell			
68	Naughty workhouse lad – (The)	Marshall Cresswell			
70	Happy Pair O' Blyth – (The)	Marshall Cresswell			
72	Willow Tree – (The)	Marshall Cresswell			
72	short bio	Robert Gillespy, farmer			
73	Pea-puddin' hot	Marshall Cresswell	Jennywine Yest		
74	That day hes noo g'yen by	Marshall Cresswell	The Miller O' the Dee		
75	Mother winnet cum h'yem	Marshall Cresswell	Kathleen Mavourneen		
76	Robert Gledson's pedigree	Marshall Cresswell			
77	Laws, Gledson, an' Mycroft; or a struggle te be second in the class	Marshall Cresswell	The Wonderful Talleygraf		
79	Fall at Dudley – (The); Mention of Billy Fairplay	Marshall Cresswell			
80	Wonderful change at Dudley – (The); Mention of new pit heap etc.	Marshall Cresswell			
81	Grainger Monnymint – (The)	Marshall Cresswell	Wundorful Tallygrip		
83	Nanny Moore; a parody	Marshall Cresswell			
94	North Durham election – (The)	Marshall Cresswell			
95	Collier's doom – (The)	Marshall Cresswell			
95	mention of	James Lennon			
98	Good Templar's happy home – (The)	Marshall Cresswell			
99	Poor convict lad – (The)	Marshall Cresswell			
100	Modest appeal – (A)	Marshall Cresswell			
103	Dudley Colliery to Burneo (sic)	Marshall Cresswell		Sailing to, working in, and returning from Sarawak, 1857-1859 Previously serialised in Newcastle Courant, 18 January - 12 April 1878	
141	Contents				

== See also ==
- Geordie dialect words
- Marshall Cresswell
