= Robert B. Carleson =

American social policy advisor (1931–2006)

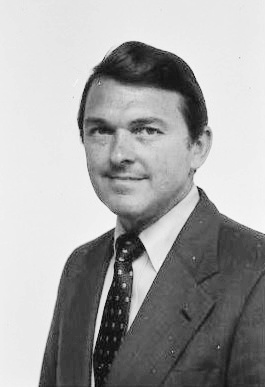
- 1981

Personal details
- Born: February 21, 1931
- Died: April 21, 2006 (aged 75)
- Education: University of Southern California

Robert B. Carleson (February 21, 1931 – April 21, 2006) was a key policy advisor on welfare issues to Ronald Reagan in California and the White House; he also founded a conservative alternative to the American Civil Liberties Union called the American Civil Rights Union in 1998.

== Early years and education ==
Carleson was Eagle Scout of the Year in Long Beach, California in 1949. He earned Bachelor’s and master's degrees in Public Administration at the University of Southern California. Carleson served in the U.S. Navy and Marine Corps during the Korean War from 1953 to 1956.

== Career ==
Carleson spent twelve years as a city administrator in Southern California. In 1968, Carleson was appointed as Chief Deputy Director of the California State Department of Public Works. At the request of Governor Ronald Reagan, Carleson laid the major policy groundwork for California’s 1971 welfare reform. Reagan then appointed Carleson as Director of the California State Department of Social Welfare, where Carleson worked to implement the reform.

In 1973, Secretary of Health, Education, and Welfare Caspar Weinberger named Carleson as U.S. Commissioner of Welfare.

Carleson advised the 1976 and 1980 Reagan for President campaigns, and he organized the Reagan transition team for the U.S. Department of Health and Human Services.

From 1981 to 1984, Carleson worked on the White House staff as Special Assistant to the President for Policy Development. He was a special advisor for Federalism policy and was the executive secretary of the Cabinet Council on Human Resources. He was the author of the 1981 Welfare Reforms in the 1981 Budget Reconciliation Act.

Carleson continued to write prolifically about welfare reform in the 1990s and was a leading voice for reform prior to the Welfare Reform of 1996 that was passed by Congress and signed by President Clinton. Carleson's memoirs were published as Government IS the Problem: Memoirs of Ronald Reagan's Welfare Reformer edited by Susan A. Carleson and Hans A. Zeiger, foreword by Edwin Meese III (Alexandria, Virginia: American Civil Rights Union, 2009), 160 pages.

== American Civil Rights Union ==
Carleson founded the American Civil Rights Union (ACRU) in 1998 to advocate for civil rights in the judiciary and public opinion. The ACRU founding Policy Board includes former U.S. Attorney General Edwin Meese III, Pepperdine Law School Dean Kenneth W. Starr, economist Walter Williams, and the late political scientist James Q. Wilson. Among the projects of the American Civil Rights Union is the Robert B. Carleson Eagle Fund, founded by Carleson’s widow Susan A. Carleson in 2009 to provide camp scholarships to disadvantaged Boy Scouts and award grants to Scout troops that have been hurt by government or philanthropic decisions.
