= Ralph Blackett =

- Born: 1831
- Died: 29 December 1877 (aged 46); Middlesbrough
- Occupations: Poet, hymn/song writer, and businessman
- Relatives: George Charleton Barron

Ralph Blackett (1831 – 29 December 1877) was an English poet, hymn (and later, dialect song) writer, and businessman, associated with Tyneside in North East England.

== Life ==
Ralph Blackett was born in 1831. He worked for many years on the Quayside, Newcastle upon Tyne, as a well respected businessman. This position had been earned by his own endeavours, ability and hard work. He lost it, in misfortune and a downturn in trade.

He was related to George Charleton Barron, an actor, mimic and elocutionist. Like many of his contemporaries, he appears in Allan's Illustrated Edition of Tyneside songs and readings with lives, portraits and autographs of the writers, and notes on the songs. Revised Edition.

Blackett was refined and well mannered. Well brought up, he was quiet and reserved, but at the same time could be genial and kind, particularly with friends. Later in life he moved to Middlesbrough, where he died on 29 December 1877, aged 46.

== Writing ==
In his youth, he had been a prolific Hymn writer, many of his works were considered to be very beautiful.

It is rumoured that one of these sacred works was published, but no trace appears to remain. As he grew older he also turned to songs and poetry, generally in a rich Geordie dialect.

He became a regular contributor to Charter's Chronicle and Annual and he won a prize with his first dialectic song from the Newcastle Weekly Chronicle with "Jimmy's Deeth" which was later incorporated into the pantomime at Newcastle's Tyne theatre.

His works include:

- "Fortnith's wages weekly" - about a rumour that wages will be paid weekly instead of fortnightly - first appeared in Keelmin's comic annewal, for 1871 (which supposedly "gi'es ye the best bits o' wit an' wisdim, be the clivvorest cheps aboot Tyneside")
- "Jimmy’s deeth" – won a prize in the Newcastle Weekly Chronicle

== See also ==
- Geordie dialect words
