= Carleson measure =

In mathematics, a Carleson measure is a type of measure on subsets of n-dimensional Euclidean space R^{n}. Roughly speaking, a Carleson measure on a domain Ω is a measure that does not vanish at the boundary of Ω when compared to the surface measure on the boundary of Ω.

Carleson measures have many applications in harmonic analysis and the theory of partial differential equations, for instance in the solution of Dirichlet problems with "rough" boundary. The Carleson condition is closely related to the boundedness of the Poisson operator. Carleson measures are named after the Swedish mathematician Lennart Carleson.

== Definition ==
Let n ∈ N and let Ω ⊂ R^{n} be an open (and hence measurable) set with non-empty boundary ∂Ω. Let μ be a Borel measure on Ω, and let σ denote the surface measure on ∂Ω. The measure μ is said to be a Carleson measure if there exists a constant C > 0 such that, for every point p ∈ ∂Ω and every radius r > 0,

$$\mu \left( \Omega \cap \mathbb{B}_{r} (p) \right) \leq C \sigma \left( \partial \Omega \cap \mathbb{B}_{r} (p) \right),$$

where

$$\mathbb{B}_{r} (p) := \left\{ x \in \mathbb{R}^{n} \left| \| x - p \|_{\mathbb{R}^{n}} < r \right. \right\}$$

denotes the open ball of radius r about p.

== Carleson's theorem on the Poisson operator ==
Let D denote the unit disc in the complex plane C, equipped with some Borel measure μ. For 1 ≤ p < +∞, let H^{p}(∂D) denote the Hardy space on the boundary of D and let L^{p}(D, μ) denote the L^{p} space on D with respect to the measure μ. Define the Poisson operator

$$P : H^{p} (\partial D) \to L^{p} (D, \mu)$$

by

$$P(f) (z) = \frac{1}{2 \pi} \int_{0}^{2 \pi} \mathrm{Re} \frac{e^{i t} + z}{e^{i t} - z} f(e^{i t}) \, \mathrm{d} \mu(t).$$

Then P is a bounded linear operator if and only if the measure μ is Carleson.

== Other related concepts ==
The infimum of the set of constants C > 0 for which the Carleson condition

$$\forall r > 0, \forall p \in \partial \Omega, \mu \left( \Omega \cap \mathbb{B}_{r} (p) \right) \leq C \sigma \left( \partial \Omega \cap \mathbb{B}_{r} (p) \right)$$

holds is known as the Carleson norm of the measure μ.

If C(R) is defined to be the infimum of the set of all constants C > 0 for which the restricted Carleson condition

$$\forall r \in (0, R), \forall p \in \partial \Omega, \mu \left( \Omega \cap \mathbb{B}_{r} (p) \right) \leq C \sigma \left( \partial \Omega \cap \mathbb{B}_{r} (p) \right)$$

holds, then the measure μ is said to satisfy the vanishing Carleson condition if C(R) → 0 as R → 0.
