= John W. Chater =

English publisher, printer and bookseller

John William Chater (1840–1885) was a prominent 19th-century Tyneside publisher, printer and bookseller, with premises in the centre of Newcastle.

== Brief details ==
Chater was born in Sunderland, Durham. Through his various publications, he ran, each year, several competitions for songwriters and poets. This continued for many years and his prizes were treasured by the winners.

He also published The Northern Journal through his premises at 89 Clayton Street, Newcastle in which, according to an item in the "National Postage Stamp Express" dated 15 June 1864, advertisements cost "20 words for 6d (equivalent to 2½ new pence) and 2d for every additional 8 words"

== Works ==
These include :-

- Chater's Illustrated Comic Tyneside Almanac for 1862 ... . written I' the Northumberland Dialect egzackly hoo the Newcassel Poaks tawk. By J. P. Robson, .... an' uthor cliwor cheps a' owthor belangin Newcassel, G'yetsid, or sumways else, Published by J. W. Chater, Newcastle upon Tyne – published between (at least) 1862 and 1866 (The 1866 edition had 48 pages)
- The Keelmin's Comic Annewal, for 18??, gi'es ye the best bits o' wit an' wisdim, be the clivvorest cheps aboot Tyneside; Awl M'yed Oot O' Thor Awn Heeds, An 'Lustrayted Wi' Lots Iv Curius An' Clivvor Comic Cuts.Be J. L. Marcke an' C. H. Ross,(B'yeth Reg'lae Cawshins.) Price Sixpence – Reddy Munny – Published by J. W. Chater, 89, Clayton Street, Newcastle-upon-Tyne. Copyright – Entered at Stationers'Hall – published between (at least) 1869 and 1883
- Chater's "Canny Newcassel" Diary and Local Remembrancer, For Bissextile or Leap-Year, 1872. Compiled expressly for this district. J. W. Chater, 89, Clayton Street, Newcastle upon Tyne – 1872 (of 154 pages)
- Chater's Annual for 18?? containing – Mirth for Midsummer, Merriment for Michaelmass, Cheerfulness for Christmas, and Laughter for Lady-Day, forming a collection of Parlour Poetry and Drawing Room Drollery, suitable for all seasons; And supplying Smiles for Summer, Amusement for Autumn, Wit for Winter, and Sprightlyness for Spring. Illustrated by J. L. Marcke, Newcastle upon Tyne J. W. Chater, Stationers, 89 Clayton Street, Newcastle upon Tyne. Entered at Stationers Hall Published between (at least) 1861 and 1882
- Chater's Illustrated Comic Tyneside Almanac for 1862 written in the Northumberland Dialect egzackly hoo the Newcassel Foaks tawk. By J. P. Robson, an' uthor cliwor cheps a' owthor belangin Newcassel, G'yetsid, or sumways else. Published by J. W. Chater, Newcastle-upon-Tyne. 1862 – Published between (at least) 1862 and 1875
- Marshall Cresswell's Local and other Songs, Recitations, Etc Composed by Marshall Cresswell, Dudley, Northumberland. With Introductory Autobiography (second edition) Illustrated by J. W. Marcke. Newcastle-upon-Tyne. J. W. Chater 61 & 62 Grainger Street, West, 21, Collingwood Street, 89, Clayton Street, and "Cross House", Westgate Road and all Booksellers – A book of some 36 pages in 1876.
- Marshall Cresswell's ditto – second edition of over 140 pages in 1883
- Northern Rhymes Including “Delaval” and “The Monk” with numerous other pieces, general and local. By the writer of “The Lambton Worm”(and containing some dialect) Published by J. R. Smith of London and J. W. Chater of Newcastle, 1872
- Lawson’s Tyneside Celebrities – Sketches of the lives and labours of Famous Men of the North, published by the author William D Lawson – sold by J. W. Chater, 89 Clayton St, Newcastle 1873

== See also ==
- Geordie dialect words
- Cresswell's Local and other Songs and Recitations 1883
- Allan's Illustrated Edition of Tyneside Songs and Readings
- Chater’s Annual – a yearbook published between 1861-1882
- Chater's Canny Newcassel Diary and Remembrancer 1872
- Chater’s Keelmin's Comic Annewal – a yearbook published between 1869 and 1883
